= Deuntzer Cabinet =

1901–05 government of Denmark

Deuntzer cabinet
- 21st Cabinet of Denmark

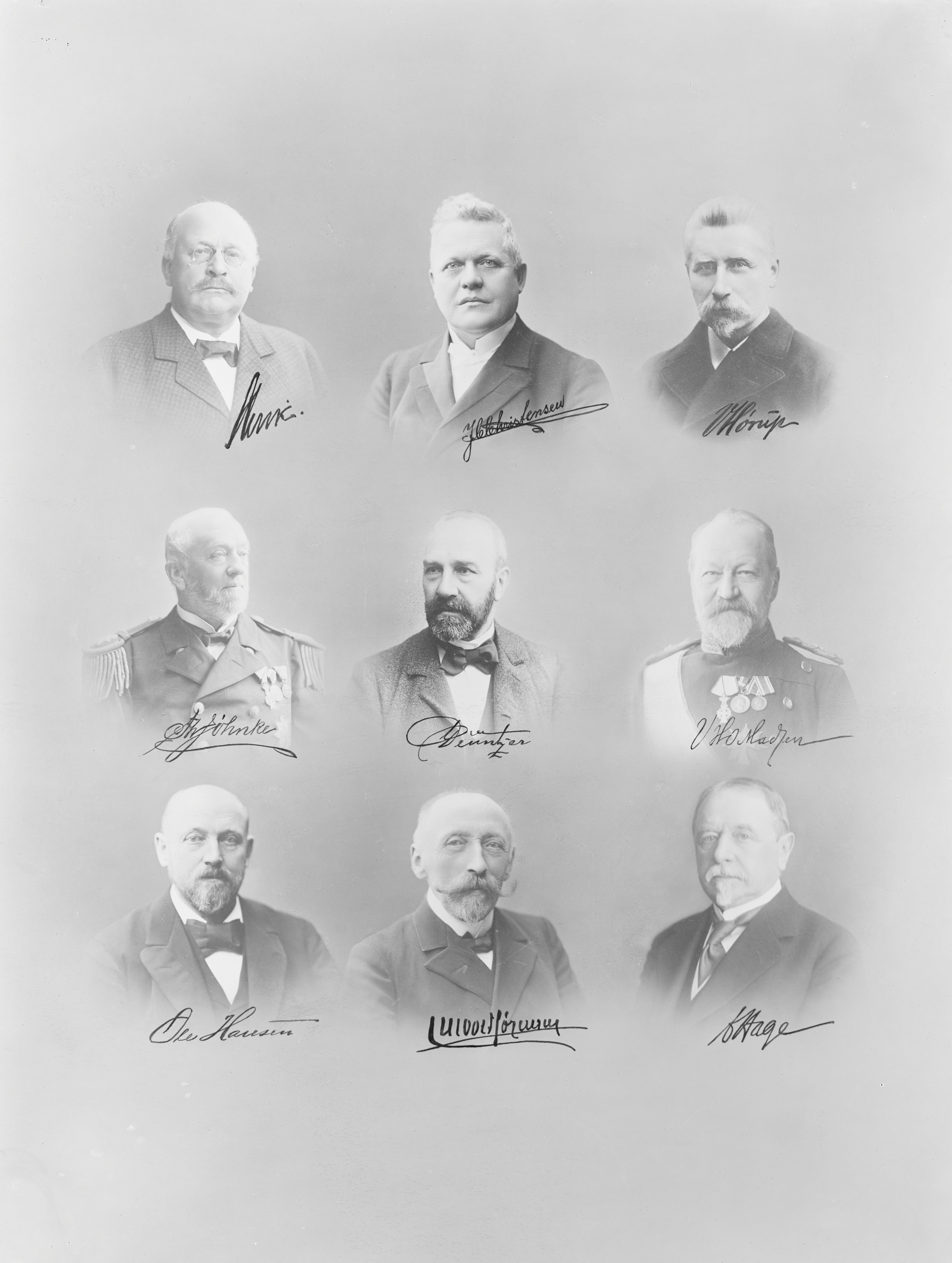
- Date formed: 24 July 1901
- Date dissolved: 14 January 1905

People and organisations
- Monarch: Christian IX
- Council President: Johan Henrik Deuntzer
- No. of ministers: 10
- Total no. of members: 12
- Member party: Venstre Reform Party

History
- Elections: 1901; 1903
- Predecessor: Sehested
- Successor: Christensen I

After the 1901 Danish Folketing election, the Council President Johan Henrik Deuntzer of the Venstre Reform Party became the leader of Denmark's first liberal government. The resulting cabinet, which replaced the Cabinet of Sehested consisting of members of the conservative party Højre, was formed on 24 July 1901 and was called the Cabinet of Deuntzer. The formation of the new cabinet is referred to in Danish as "systemskiftet", the shift of government.

The cabinet marked the introduction of parliamentarism in Denmark and with the exception of the Easter Crisis of 1920 no Danish government since 1901 has been formed against the vote of a majority of the members of Folketinget.

There were several internal conflicts within the cabinet. According to Justice Minister Peter Adler Alberti it had 27 crises on minister level, not counting the minor ones, but it did nevertheless manage to institute a number of reforms and in particular an extensive tax reform. The cabinet was replaced by the Cabinet of J.C. Christensen I on 14 January 1905.

== Formation ==
=== Shift of government ===
Even though the election on 3 April 1901 had reduced Højre's representation in Folketinget to 8 seats of 114, Højre still had a majority of the seats in Landstinget and Hannibal Sehested remained Council President at first regardless of the election results. King Christian IX was however under some pressure to institute a new government that would represent a larger part of the voters. Princess Marie of Orléans, wife of Prince Valdemar and daughter-in-law of Christian IX, was the one to recommend Deuntzer to the king, and she had written a complete step-by-step plan for him on how to get rid of Sehested and Højre.

Deuntzer was not an obvious choice for Council President as his only political experience was a failed candidacy for Landstinget 15 years earlier and as he was no more a pronounced member of the Venstre Reform Party than for Hugo Egmont Hørring to offer him the position as justice minister in the Cabinet of Hørring in 1897, an offer he had declined on the advice of Viggo Hørup. Princess Marie knew him from her frequent visits to the office of the East Asiatic Company, where both he and her husband were members of the board, and her main reason for recommending him to the king was the fact that his limited connection to the opposition would prevent his appointment from appearing to be an acknowledgement of parliamentarism.

The king made his final decision on whether to make follow Princess Marie's recommendation on 22 May studying the confidential reports of a Højre board meeting and a meeting between the leaders of the party and the editors of the press supporting the party. The reports showed that the party's support of the government mildly put was failing, which was in direct contradiction with Sehested's relaxed description of his situation. That convinced him to ask Sehested to hand in his resignation on 15 July when the king returned from a stay at a health resort.

Upon the king's return Sehested turned in his resignation as expected and officially his replacement was yet to be found. Princess Marie had conveniently arranged for Deuntzer to meet the king at a social event at Bernstorff Palace on that evening. During the evening the king asked Deuntzer: "So you are a leftist, Mr. Professor?", to which Deuntzer answered: "To a degree, Your Majesty." Apparently this was all he needed to hear, as on the following day he officially asked Deuntzer to form a new cabinet.

=== Distribution of portfolios ===
The process of forming the cabinet was not an easy task however. Internally the Venstre Reform Party was split in three groups: The Alberti-wing, the right wing within the party, supported mainly by the farmers of Zealand, the "bergians" named after the former leader of the party Christen Berg, were supported mainly by the farmers of Jutland and led by the current leader of the party Jens Christian Christensen, and finally the Hørup-supporters, forming the left wing within the party, were mainly supported by the voters of Copenhagen and had Viggo Hørup, the editor of the newspaper Politiken, as the central figure. The distribution of portfolios became a careful compromise between the three groups and Deuntzer was forced to leave the task of choosing the cabinet member to the leaders of the three groups. His original intention had been for himself to become justice minister and for Ludvig Holstein-Ledreborg to become council president. However both Alberti and Christensen opposed this and Holstein-Ledreborg stated to a journalist that he was not interested in reentering politics at that point in time. Instead Hørup himself, even though he was somewhat weakened from cancer, was brought in to represent the Hørup-supporters along with Christopher Friedenreich Hage.

The new cabinet was officially announced after about a week on 24 July 1901.

== Cabinet changes ==
The cabinet was changed on 15 February 1902 because of the death of Hørup. Hage became the new minister for public works. No changes were made to the cabinet as a result of the 1903 Folketing election and the next change to the cabinet was on 1 February 1904 when Hannes Hafstein took the post as minister for Iceland as the first Icelander. The Constitutional Act of Iceland of 3 October 1903 stated that the minister for Iceland had to be a resident of Reykjavík and be able to read and write Icelandic. The ministry had until then been a part of the justice ministry of Denmark, but with the new Constitutional Act it was made responsible to the Icelandic Althing and Iceland obtained home rule. The fact that Deuntzer had countersigned the nomination of Hafstein was considered Danish meddling in Icelandic affairs, however.

== Politics ==
=== Tax reform ===
Before 1903 the only direct, Danish tax had been the so-called "hartkorn tax" on farm land based on a classification of quality, usability and area. The tax reform of 1903 replaced the hartkorn tax with a tax on real estate inspired by the publications of Henry George and introduced a progressive income tax and a wealth tax. Even though the income tax at 1.3%–2.5% would be considered low by modern standards, it was expected to amount to more than half of what the new taxes would bring in. This meant that the tax reform was an extensive redistribution of the tax income generally favoring the farmers and the big landowners in particular at the expense of the town dwellers.

=== School reform ===
In an attempt to make the public school system appealing to the entire population a four-year middle school for students over 11 years, was established in 1903 to form a bridge between the Folkeskole and the Realskole (lower secondary school) and the Gymnasium. At the same time the Gymnasium became more up-to-date as Latin and Greek were replaced by English, German, and French as the main subjects of the languages line.

== Internal conflicts ==
=== Alberti's legal reform ===
The legal reform Alberti presented to the Rigsdag in 1903 was a controversial attempt at controlling violence by reintroducing judicial corporal punishment. Deuntzer was, as a professor of law, strongly opposed to this, and when the law was approved by the Folketing, he threatened to resign if it were approved by the Landsting as well. It was not, however Alberti did manage to reintroduce corporal punishment in 1905 as justice minister in the Cabinet of J.C. Christensen I.

== List of ministers and portfolios ==
Some terms in the table below end after 14 January 1905 because the minister was in the Cabinet of J.C. Christensen I as well.

Portfolio	Minister	Took office	Left office	Party
Council President & Minister of Foreign Affairs	Johan Henrik Deuntzer	24 July 1901	14 January 1905	Venstre Reform
Minister for Finance	Christopher Hage	24 July 1901	14 January 1905	Venstre Reform
Minister of War	Vilhelm Herman Oluf Madsen	24 July 1901	14 January 1905	Venstre Reform
Minister of the Navy	Ferdinand Henrik Jøhnke	24 July 1901	14 January 1905	Venstre Reform
Kultus Minister	Jens Christian Christensen	24 July 1901	14 January 1905	Venstre Reform
Minister of Justice	Peter Adler Alberti	24 July 1901	24 July 1908	Venstre Reform
Minister of the Interior	Enevold Frederik Adolf Sørensen	24 July 1901	14 January 1905	Venstre Reform
Minister of Public Works	Viggo Hørup	24 July 1901	15 February 1902	Venstre Reform
Minister of Public Works	Christopher Hage	15 February 1902	14 January 1905	Venstre Reform
Minister for Iceland	Peter Adler Alberti	24 July 1901	1 February 1904	Venstre Reform
Minister for Iceland	Hannes Hafstein	1 February 1904	12 October 1909	Home Rule
Minister for Agriculture	Ole Hansen	24 July 1901	24 July 1908	Venstre Reform

Preceded by Sehested	Cabinet of Denmark; 1901–1905	Succeeded by Christensen I

== Notes and references ==
=== General references ===
- Friisberg, Claus (1976). Reformår i dansk politik 1901–19 (in Danish). Gyldendal. ISBN 87-01-44111-6.
- Olsen, Poul Erik, ed. (1992). Ministermødeprotokol 1901–1905 (in Danish). Rigsarkivet, G.E.C. Gad. ISBN 87-7497-146-8.
- Skou, Kaare (2001). Dramatiske døgn i folkestyret (in Danish). Aschehoug. ISBN 87-11-11530-0.
