= 1892 Danish Folketing election =

Election for the lower house of Danish Parliament

- 20 April 1892
- All 102 seats in the Folketing; 52 seats needed for a majority
Party	Leader	Vote %	Seats	+/–
Højre	J.B.S. Estrup	34.8	31	+7
Moderate Venstre		28.1	39	New
Venstre	Edvard Brandes	28.1	30	−45
Social Democrats	Peter Christian Knudsen	8.9	2	−1
This lists parties that won seats. See the complete results below.
Council President before	Council President after
J.B.S. Estrup; Højre	J.B.S. Estrup; Højre

Folketing elections were held in Denmark on 20 April 1892.

== Results ==
Party	Votes	%	Seats	+/–
Højre		34.8	31	+7
Moderate Venstre		28.1	39	New
Venstre Reform Party		28.1	30	–45
Social Democratic Party		8.9	2	–1
Total			102	0
Registered voters/turnout	363,277	63.8		
Source: Hatting
