= 1906 Danish Landsting election =

Landsting elections were held in Denmark on 21 September 1906.

Of the twelve constituencies the seats representing constituencies number 1 (the city of Copenhagen), number 2 (Copenhagen County, Frederiksborg County and Holbæk County), number 4 (Bornholm County), number 7 (Hjørring County and Aalborg County) and number 9 (Aarhus County, Randers County and parts of Viborg County) were up for election.

== Results ==
Party	Seats			
Party	Won	Not up	Total	+/–
Højre	13	14	27	–2
Venstre Reform Party	7	13	20	–1
Free Conservatives	1	9	10	0
Moderate Venstre	1	3	4	+1
Social Democratic Party	4	0	4	+3
Danish Social Liberal Party	1	0	1	New
Total	27	39	66	0
Source: Bang
