= List of ministers for finance (Denmark) =

Minister of Finance
- Finansminister
- State coat of arms of the Kingdom of Denmark

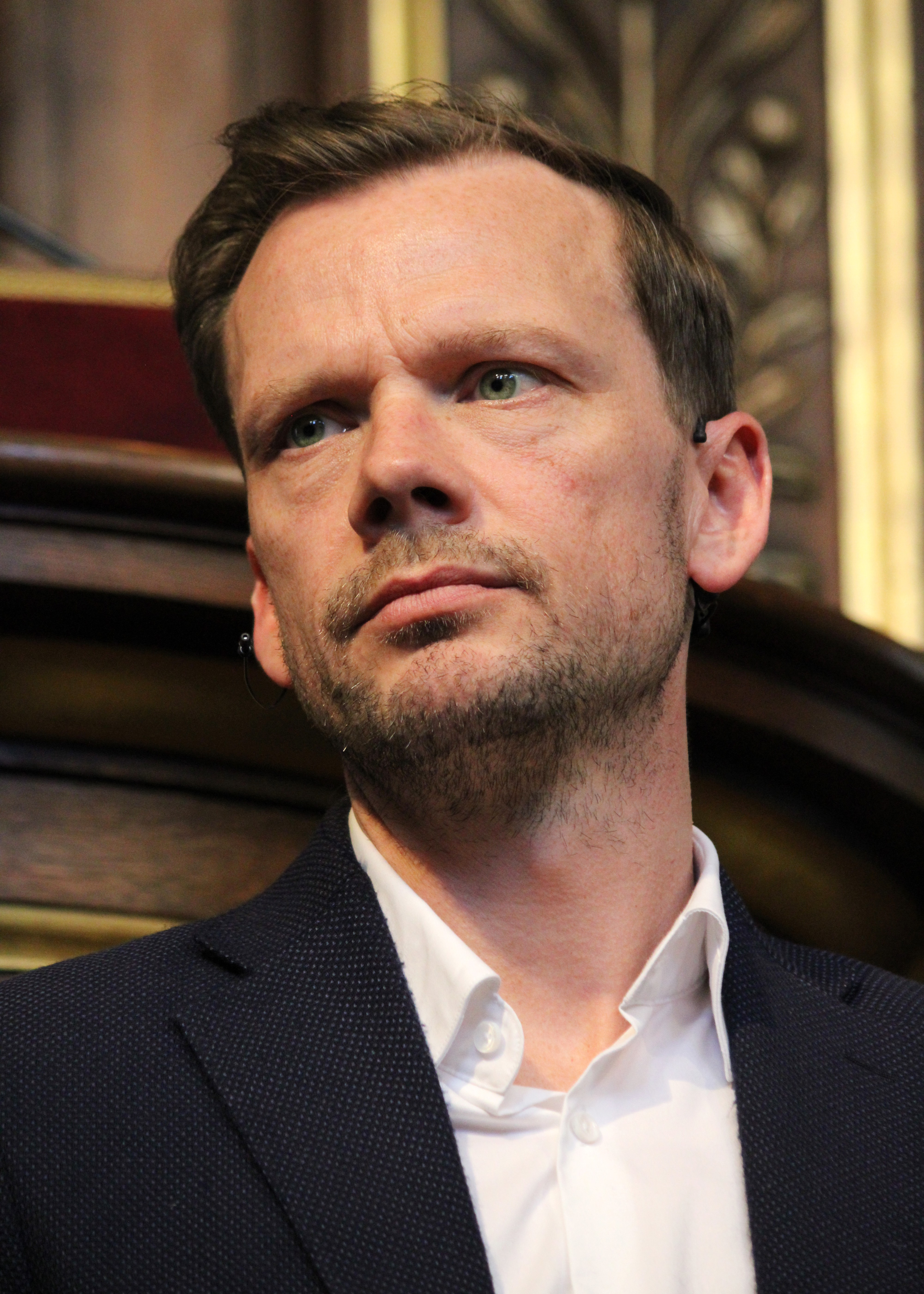
- Incumbent; Peter Hummelgaard since 3 June 2026
- Ministry of Finance
- Type: Minister
- Member of: Cabinet; State Council; Government's Coordination Committee; Government's Economic Committee; Government's Security Committee; Government's Employment Committee
- Reports to: the Prime minister
- Seat: Slotsholmen
- Appointer: The Monarch; (on the advice of the Prime Minister)
- Formation: 22 March 1848; 178 years ago
- First holder: Adam Wilhelm Moltke
- Succession: depending on the order in the State Council
- Deputy: Permanent Secretary
- Salary: 1.786.953,32 DKK (€239,724), in 2026

This is a list of finance ministers of Denmark since Denmark's first unified finance ministry was established in 1848.

== List of finance ministers (1848–present) ==
=== Ministers under Frederick VII (1848–1863) ===
No.	Portrait	Name (born–died)	Term of office			Political party	Government	Ref.
No.	Portrait	Name (born–died)	Took office	Left office	Time in office	Political party	Government	Ref.
1		Adam Wilhelm Moltke (1785–1864)	22 March 1848	16 November 1848	239 days	Independent	Moltke I	
2		Wilhelm Sponneck (1815–1888)	16 November 1848	12 December 1854	6 years, 26 days	Independent	Moltke II–III–IV; Bluhme I Ørsted	
3		Carl Christoffer Georg Andræ (1812–1893)	12 December 1854	10 July 1858	3 years, 210 days	Society of the Friends of Peasants	Bang; Andræ; Hall I	
4		Andreas Frederik Krieger (1817–1893)	10 July 1858	6 May 1859	300 days	National Liberal	Hall I	
5		Carl Emil Fenger (1814–1884)	6 May 1859	2 December 1859	210 days	Independent	Hall I	
6		Regnar Westenholz (1815–1866)	2 December 1859	24 February 1860	84 days	Independent	Rotwitt	
5		Carl Emil Fenger (1814–1884)	24 February 1860	31 December 1863	3 years, 310 days	Independent	Hall II	

=== Ministers under Christian IX (1863–1906) ===
No.	Portrait	Name (born–died)	Term of office			Political party	Government	Ref.
No.	Portrait	Name (born–died)	Took office	Left office	Time in office	Political party	Government	Ref.
7		Ditlev Gothard Monrad (1811–1887)	31 December 1863	11 July 1864	193 days	National Liberal	Monrad	
8		Christian Nathan David (1793–1874)	11 July 1864	6 November 1865	1 year, 118 days	Independent	Bluhme II	
9		Christen Andreas Fonnesbech (1817–1880)	6 November 1865	28 May 1870	4 years, 203 days	Independent	Krag-Juel-Vind-Frijs	
(5)		Carl Emil Fenger (1814–1884)	28 May 1870	25 March 1872	1 year, 302 days	Independent	Holstein-Holsteinborg	
–		Ludvig Holstein-Holsteinborg (1815–1892) acting	25 March 1872	1 July 1872	98 days	Centre	Holstein-Holsteinborg	
(4)		Andreas Frederik Krieger (1817–1893)	1 July 1872	20 June 1874	1 year, 354 days	National Liberal	Holstein-Holsteinborg	
–		Ludvig Holstein-Holsteinborg (1815–1892) acting	20 June 1874	14 July 1874	24 days	Centre	Holstein-Holsteinborg	
(9)		Christen Andreas Fonnesbech (1817–1880)	14 July 1874	11 June 1875	332 days	Independent	Fonnesbech	
10		Jacob Brønnum Scavenius Estrup (1825–1913)	11 June 1875	7 August 1894	19 years, 57 days	National Landowners	Estrup	
10		Jacob Brønnum Scavenius Estrup (1825–1913)	11 June 1875	7 August 1894	19 years, 57 days	Højre	Estrup	
11		Christian Lüttichau (1832–1915)	7 August 1894	23 May 1897	2 years, 289 days	Højre	Reedtz-Thott	
12		Hugo Egmont Hørring (1842–1909)	23 May 1897	27 April 1900	2 years, 339 days	Højre	Hørring	
13		William Scharling (1837–1911)	27 April 1900	24 July 1901	1 year, 88 days	Højre	Sehested	
14		Christopher Hage (1848–1930)	24 July 1901	14 January 1905	3 years, 174 days	Venstre Reform Party	Deuntzer	
15		Vilhelm Lassen (1861–1908)	14 January 1905	6 April 1908 #	3 years, 83 days	Venstre Reform Party	Christensen I	
–		Jens Christian Christensen (1856–1930) acting	6 April 1908	24 July 1908	109 days	Venstre Reform Party	Christensen I	

=== Ministers under Frederik VIII (1906–1912) ===
No.	Portrait	Name (born–died)	Term of office			Political party	Government	Ref.
No.	Portrait	Name (born–died)	Took office	Left office	Time in office	Political party	Government	Ref.
16		Niels Neergaard (1854–1936)	24 July 1908	12 October 1908	80 days	Moderate Venstre	Christensen II	
17		Charles Brun (1866–1919)	12 October 1908	16 September 1909	339 days	Venstre Reform Party	Neergaard I	
(16)		Niels Neergaard (1854–1936)	16 August 1909	28 October 1909	73 days	Venstre	Holstein-Ledreborg	
18		Edvard Brandes (1847–1931)	28 October 1909	5 July 1910	250 days	Social Liberal	Zahle I	
(16)		Niels Neergaard (1854–1936)	5 July 1910	21 June 1913	2 years, 351 days	Venstre	Berntsen	

=== Ministers under Christian X (1912–1947) ===
No.	Portrait	Name (born–died)	Term of office			Political party	Government	Ref.
No.	Portrait	Name (born–died)	Took office	Left office	Time in office	Political party	Government	Ref.
(18)		Edvard Brandes (1847–1931)	21 June 1913	30 March 1920	6 years, 283 days	Social Liberal	Zahle II	
19		Hans Peter Hjerl Hansen (1870–1946)	30 March 1920	5 April 1920	6 days	Independent	Liebe	
20		Michael Koefoed (1870–1946)	5 April 1920	5 May 1920	30 days	Independent	Friis	
(16)		Niels Neergaard (1854–1936)	5 May 1920	23 April 1924	3 years, 354 days	Venstre	Neergaard II–III	
21		Carl Valdemar Bramsnæs (1879–1965)	23 April 1924	14 December 1926	2 years, 235 days	Social Democrats	Stauning I	
(16)		Niels Neergaard (1854–1936)	14 December 1926	30 April 1929	2 years, 137 days	Venstre	Madsen-Mygdal	
(21)		Carl Valdemar Bramsnæs (1879–1965)	30 April 1929	31 May 1933	4 years, 31 days	Social Democrats	Stauning II	
22		Hans Peter Hansen (1872–1953)	31 May 1933	20 July 1937	4 years, 50 days	Social Democrats	Stauning II–III	
23		Vilhelm Buhl (1881–1954)	20 July 1937	16 July 1942	4 years, 361 days	Social Democrats	Stauning III–IV–V–VI; Buhl I	
24		Alsing Andersen (1893–1962)	16 July 1942	9 November 1942	116 days	Social Democrats	Buhl I	
25		Kristian Hansen Kofoed (1879–1951)	9 November 1942	29 August 1943	293 days	Social Liberal	Scavenius	
No Danish government (29 August 1943 (Note: On 29 August 1943, the Danish government resigned, refusing to grant further concessions to Nazi Germany. All government operations were assumed by the permanent secretaries of the individual departments, and this arrangement lasted until the Liberation of Denmark on 5 May 1945. Since King Christian X never accepted the resignation of the government, it existed de jure until a new cabinet was formed on 5 May 1945.) – 5 May 1945). Office is assumed by the permanent secretary.
26		Hans Christian Hansen (1906–1960)	5 May 1945	7 November 1945	186 days	Social Democrats	Buhl II	
27		Thorkil Kristensen (1899–1989)	7 November 1945	13 November 1947	2 years, 6 days	Venstre	Kristensen	

=== Ministers under Frederik IX (1947–1972) ===
No.	Portrait	Name (born–died)	Term of office			Political party	Government	Ref.
No.	Portrait	Name (born–died)	Took office	Left office	Time in office	Political party	Government	Ref.
(26)		Hans Christian Hansen (1906–1960)	13 November 1947	16 September 1950	2 years, 307 days	Social Democrats	Hedtoft I	
28		Viggo Kampmann (1910–1976)	16 September 1950	30 October 1950	44 days	Social Democrats	Hedtoft I–II	
(27)		Thorkil Kristensen (1899–1989)	30 October 1950	30 September 1953	2 years, 335 days	Venstre	Eriksen	
28		Viggo Kampmann (1910–1976)	30 September 1953	31 March 1960	6 years, 183 days	Social Democrats	Hedtoft III; Hansen I–II; Kampmann I	
29		Kjeld Philip (1912–1989)	31 March 1960	7 September 1961	1 year, 160 days	Social Liberal	Kampmann I–II	
30		Hans R. Knudsen (1903–1962)	7 September 1961	4 November 1962 #	1 year, 160 days	Social Democrats	Kampmann II; Krag I	
31		Poul Hansen (1913–1966)	15 November 1962	24 August 1965	2 years, 282 days	Social Democrats	Krag I–II	
32		Henry Grünbaum (1911–2006)	24 August 1965	2 February 1968	2 years, 162 days	Social Democrats	Krag II	
33		Poul Møller (1919–1997)	2 February 1968	17 March 1971	3 years, 43 days	Conservative People's Party	Baunsgaard	
34		Erik Ninn-Hansen (1922–2014)	17 March 1971	11 October 1971	208 days	Conservative People's Party	Baunsgaard	
(32)		Henry Grünbaum (1911–2006)	11 October 1971	19 December 1973	2 years, 69 days	Social Democrats	Krag III; Jørgensen I	

=== Ministers under Margrethe II (1972–2024) ===
No.	Portrait	Name (born–died)	Term of office			Political party	Government	Ref.
No.	Portrait	Name (born–died)	Took office	Left office	Time in office	Political party	Government	Ref.
35		Anders Ejnar Andersen (1912–2006)	19 December 1973	13 February 1975	1 year, 56 days	Venstre	Hartling	
36		Knud Heinesen (1932–2025)	13 February 1975	26 October 1979	4 years, 255 days	Social Democrats	Jørgensen II–III	
37		Svend Jakobsen (1935–2022)	26 October 1979	30 December 1981	2 years, 65 days	Social Democrats	Jørgensen IV	
(36)		Knud Heinesen (1932–2025)	30 December 1981	10 September 1982	254 days	Social Democrats	Jørgensen V	
38		Henning Christophersen (1939–2016)	10 September 1982	23 July 1984	1 year, 317 days	Venstre	Schlüter I	
39		Palle Simonsen (1933–2014)	23 July 1984	31 October 1989	5 years, 100 days	Conservative People's Party	Schlüter I–II–III	
40		Henning Dyremose (born 1945)	31 October 1989	25 January 1993	3 years, 86 days	Conservative People's Party	Schlüter III–IV	
41		Mogens Lykketoft (born 1946)	25 January 1993	21 December 2000	7 years, 331 days	Social Democrats	P. N. Rasmussen I–II–III–IV	
42		Pia Gjellerup (born 1959)	21 December 2000	27 November 2001	341 days	Social Democrats	P. N. Rasmussen IV	
43		Thor Pedersen (born 1945)	27 November 2001	23 February 2007	5 years, 88 days	Venstre	A. F. Rasmussen I–II	
44		Lars Løkke Rasmussen (born 1964)	23 November 2007	7 April 2009	1 year, 135 days	Venstre	A. F. Rasmussen III	
45		Claus Hjort Frederiksen (born 1947)	7 April 2009	3 October 2011	2 years, 179 days	Venstre	L. L. Rasmussen I	
46		Bjarne Corydon (born 1973)	3 October 2011	28 June 2015	3 years, 268 days	Social Democrats	Thorning-Schmidt I–II	
(45)		Claus Hjort Frederiksen (born 1947)	28 June 2015	28 November 2016	1 year, 153 days	Venstre	L. L. Rasmussen II	
47		Kristian Jensen (born 1971)	28 November 2016	27 June 2019	2 years, 211 days	Venstre	L. L. Rasmussen III	
48		Nicolai Wammen (born 1971)	27 June 2019	3 June 2026	6 years, 341 days	Social Democrats	Frederiksen I–II	

=== Ministers under Frederik X (2024–present) ===
No.	Portrait	Name (born–died)	Term of office			Political party	Government	Ref.
No.	Portrait	Name (born–died)	Took office	Left office	Time in office	Political party	Government	Ref.
49		Peter Hummelgaard (born 1983)	3 June 2026	Incumbent	143 days	Social Democrats	Frederiksen III	
