= 1890 Danish Folketing election =

Election for the lower house of Danish Parliament

- 21 January 1890
- All 102 seats in the Folketing; 52 seats needed for a majority
Party	Leader	Vote %	Seats	+/–
Venstre		53.0	75	+1
Højre	J.B.S. Estrup	39.7	24	−3
Social Democrats	Peter Christian Knudsen	7.3	3	+2
This lists parties that won seats. See the complete results below.
Council President before	Council President after
J.B.S. Estrup; Højre	J.B.S. Estrup; Højre

Folketing elections were held in Denmark on 21 January 1890.

== Results ==
Party	Votes	%	Seats	+/–
Venstre Reform Party		53.0	75	+1
Højre		39.7	24	–3
Social Democratic Party		7.3	3	+2
Total			102	0
Registered voters/turnout	358,432	66.3		
Source: Hatting, Nohlen & Stöver

== Bibliography ==
- Mackie, Thomas T. & Rose, Richard (1974). The International Almanac of Electoral History. London: Macmillan, p. 88.
- Møller, P. (1950). Politisk haandbog: en samling konkrete oplysninger (in Danish). Copenhagen: Hagerup, p. 308.
