= 1898 Danish Folketing election =

Election for the lower house of Danish Parliament

- 5 April 1898
- All 114 seats in the Folketing; 58 seats needed for a majority
| Party | Leader | Seats | +/– |
|---|---|---|---|
| Venstre | | 63 | +10 |
| Højre | | 16 | −9 |
| Moderate Venstre | | 23 | −4 |
| Social Democrats | Peter Christian Knudsen | 12 | +4 |
This lists parties that won seats. See the complete results below.

Folketing elections were held in Denmark on 5 April 1898.

== Results ==
| Party | Votes | % | Seats | +/– |
|---|---|---|---|---|
| Venstre Reform Party | 98,070 | | 63 | +10 |
| Højre | 58,755 | | 16 | –9 |
| Moderate Venstre | 36,395 | | 23 | –4 |
| Social Democratic Party | 31,870 | | 12 | +4 |
| Total | | | 114 | 0 |
| Registered voters/turnout | 398,515 | 59.8 | | |
Source: Nohlen & Stöver (voters/turnout)
