= 1906 Danish Folketing election =

Election for the lower house of Danish Parliament

- 29 May 1906
- All 114 seats in the Folketing; 58 seats needed for a majority
Party	Leader	Vote %	Seats	+/–
Venstre	Jens Christian Christensen	31.21	56	−17
Social Democrats	Peter Christian Knudsen	25.36	24	+8
Højre		20.97	12	0
Social Liberals	Carl Theodor Zahle	12.63	9	New
Moderate Venstre		6.78	9	−3
Independents	–	3.01	4	+1
This lists parties that won seats. See the complete results below.
Prime Minister before	Prime Minister after
Jens Christian Christensen; Venstre	Jens Christian Christensen; Venstre

Folketing elections were held in Denmark on 29 May 1906. The result was a victory for the Venstre Reform Party, which won 56 of the 114 seats. Voter turnout was 69.8%.

== Results ==
Party	Votes	%	Seats	+/–
Venstre Reform Party	94,272	31.21	56	–17
Social Democratic Party	76,612	25.36	24	+8
Højre	63,335	20.97	12	0
Danish Social Liberal Party	38,151	12.63	9	New
Moderate Venstre	20,487	6.78	9	–3
Independents	9,099	3.01	4	+3
No votes	116	0.04	–	–
Total	302,072	100.00	114	0
Valid votes	302,072	98.80		
Invalid/blank votes	3,666	1.20		
Total votes	305,738	100.00		
Registered voters/turnout	438,341	69.75		
Source: Nohlen & Stöver
