= 1884 Danish Folketing election =

Election for the lower house of Danish Parliament

- 25 June 1884
- All 102 seats in the Folketing; 52 seats needed for a majority
Party	Leader	Vote %	Seats
Venstre		56.3	81
Højre	J.B.S. Estrup	38.7	19
Social Democrats	Peter Christian Knudsen	4.9	2
This lists parties that won seats. See the complete results below.

Folketing elections were held in Denmark on 25 June 1884.

== Results ==
Party	Votes	%	Seats
Venstre Reform Party		56.3	81
Højre		38.7	19
Social Democratic Party		4.9	2
Total			102
Registered voters/turnout	322,429	59.0	
Source: Hatting, Nohlen & Stöver
