= 1887 Danish Folketing election =

Election for the lower house of Danish Parliament

- 28 January 1887
- All 102 seats in the Folketing; 52 seats needed for a majority
Party	Leader	Vote %	Seats	+/–
Venstre		58.1	74	−7
Højre	J.B.S. Estrup	38.3	27	+8
Social Democrats	Peter Christian Knudsen	3.5	1	−1
This lists parties that won seats. See the complete results below.

Folketing elections were held in Denmark on 28 January 1887.

== Results ==
Party	Votes	%	Seats	+/–
Venstre Reform Party		58.1	74	–7
Højre		38.3	27	+8
Social Democratic Party		3.5	1	–1
Total			102	0
Registered voters/turnout	337,811	69.6		
Source: Hatting, Nohlen & Stöver
