= 1909 Danish Folketing election =

Election for the lower house of Danish Parliament

- 25 May 1909
- All 114 seats in the Folketing; 58 seats needed for a majority
Party	Leader	Vote %	Seats	+/–
Social Democrats	Peter Christian Knudsen	28.71	24	0
Venstre	Ludvig Holstein-Ledreborg	23.98	37	−19
Højre		19.80	21	+9
Social Liberals	Carl Theodor Zahle	15.51	15	+6
Moderate Venstre		5.93	11	+2
Independents	–	5.68	6	+2
This lists parties that won seats. See the complete results below.
Prime Minister before	Prime Minister after
Ludvig Holstein-Ledreborg; Venstre	Ludvig Holstein-Ledreborg; Venstre

Folketing elections were held in Denmark on 25 May 1909. Although the Social Democratic Party received the largest share of the vote, the Venstre Reform Party won the most seats. Voter turnout was 71%.

== Results ==
Party	Votes	%	Seats	+/–
Social Democratic Party	93,079	28.71	24	0
Venstre Reform Party	77,749	23.98	37	–19
Højre	64,189	19.80	21	+9
Danish Social Liberal Party	50,305	15.51	15	+6
Moderate Venstre	19,241	5.93	11	+2
Independents	18,423	5.68	6	+2
No votes	1,272	0.39	–	–
Total	324,258	100.00	114	0
Valid votes	324,258	99.05		
Invalid/blank votes	3,101	0.95		
Total votes	327,359	100.00		
Registered voters/turnout	460,553	71.08		
Source: Nohlen & Stöver
