= 1913 Danish Folketing election =

Election for the lower house of Danish Parliament

- 20 May 1913
- All 114 seats in the Folketing; 58 seats needed for a majority
| Party | Leader | Vote % | Seats | +/– |
|---|---|---|---|---|
| Social Democrats | Thorvald Stauning | 29.56 | 32 | +8 |
| Venstre | Klaus Berntsen | 28.61 | 44 | −13 |
| Højre | | 22.41 | 7 | −6 |
| Social Liberals | Carl Theodor Zahle | 18.69 | 31 | +11 |
This lists parties that won seats. See the complete results below.
| Prime Minister before | Prime Minister after |
|---|---|
| Klaus Berntsen; Venstre | Carl Theodor Zahle; Social Liberals |

Folketing elections were held in Denmark on 20 May 1913. Although the Social Democratic Party received the most votes, Venstre won the most seats. Voter turnout was 74.5%.

== Results ==
| Party | Votes | % | Seats | +/– |
|---|---|---|---|---|
| Social Democratic Party | 107,365 | 29.56 | 32 | +8 |
| Venstre | 103,917 | 28.61 | 44 | –13 |
| Højre | 81,404 | 22.41 | 7 | –6 |
| Danish Social Liberal Party | 67,903 | 18.69 | 31 | +11 |
| Independents | 2,671 | 0.74 | 0 | 0 |
| Total | 363,260 | 100.00 | 114 | 0 |
| Valid votes | 363,260 | 99.19 | | |
| Invalid/blank votes | 2,955 | 0.81 | | |
| Total votes | 366,215 | 100.00 | | |
| Registered voters/turnout | 491,422 | 74.52 | | |
Source: Nohlen & Stöver
