= 1903 Danish Folketing election =

Election for the lower house of Danish Parliament

- 16 June 1903
- All 114 seats in the Folketing; 58 seats needed for a majority
| Party | Leader | Vote % | Seats | +/– |
|---|---|---|---|---|
| Venstre | Johan Hendrik Deuntzer | 47.94 | 73 | −3 |
| Højre | | 20.84 | 12 | +4 |
| Social Democrats | Peter Christian Knudsen | 20.41 | 16 | +2 |
| Moderate Venstre | | 8.12 | 12 | −4 |
| Others | – | – | 1 | +1 |
This lists parties that won seats. See the complete results below.
| Prime Minister before | Prime Minister after |
|---|---|
| Johan Henrik Deuntzer; Venstre | Johan Henrik Deuntzer; Venstre |

Folketing elections were held in Denmark on 16 June 1903.

== Campaign ==
Nine of the 114 seats were uncontested, of which seven were won by the Venstre Reform Party and two by the Social Democratic Party.

== Results ==
| Party | Votes | % | Seats | +/– |
|---|---|---|---|---|
| Venstre Reform Party | 113,000 | 47.94 | 73 | –3 |
| Højre | 49,109 | 20.84 | 12 | +4 |
| Social Democratic Party | 48,117 | 20.41 | 16 | +2 |
| Moderate Venstre | 19,149 | 8.12 | 12 | –4 |
| Others | 6,324 | 2.68 | 1 | +1 |
| Total | 235,699 | 100.00 | 114 | 0 |
| Valid votes | 235,699 | 98.33 | | |
| Invalid/blank votes | 3,999 | 1.67 | | |
| Total votes | 239,698 | 100.00 | | |
| Registered voters/turnout | 416,748 | 57.52 | | |
Source: Mackie & Rose
