= 1901 Danish Folketing election =

Election for the lower house of Danish Parliament

- 3 April 1901
- All 114 seats in the Folketing; 58 seats needed for a majority
Party	Leader	Vote %	Seats	+/–
Venstre	Johan Henrik Deuntzer	42.87	76	+13
Højre		24.04	8	−8
Social Democrats	Peter Christian Knudsen	17.06	14	+2
Moderate Venstre		11.99	16	−7
This lists parties that won seats. See the complete results below.

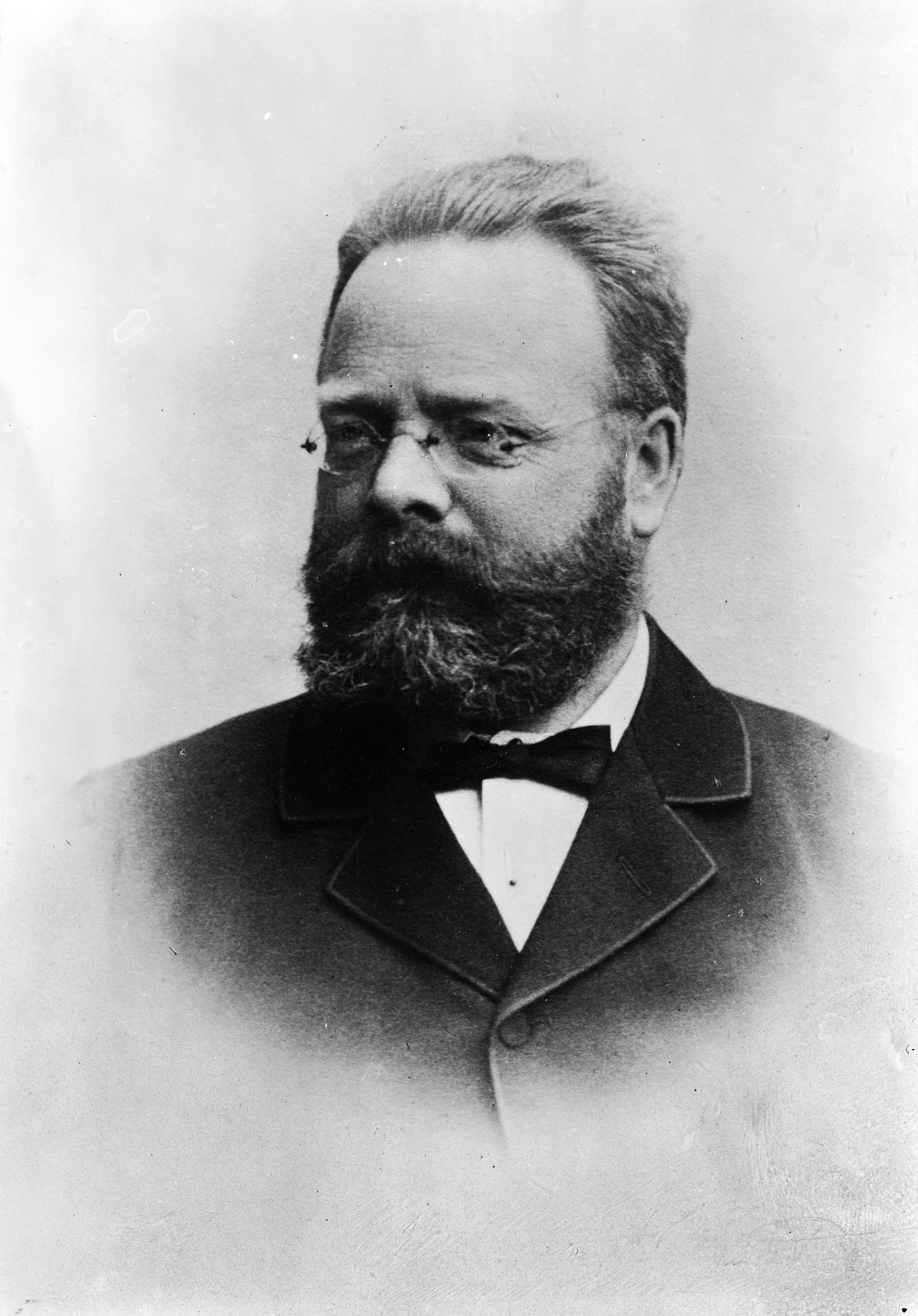

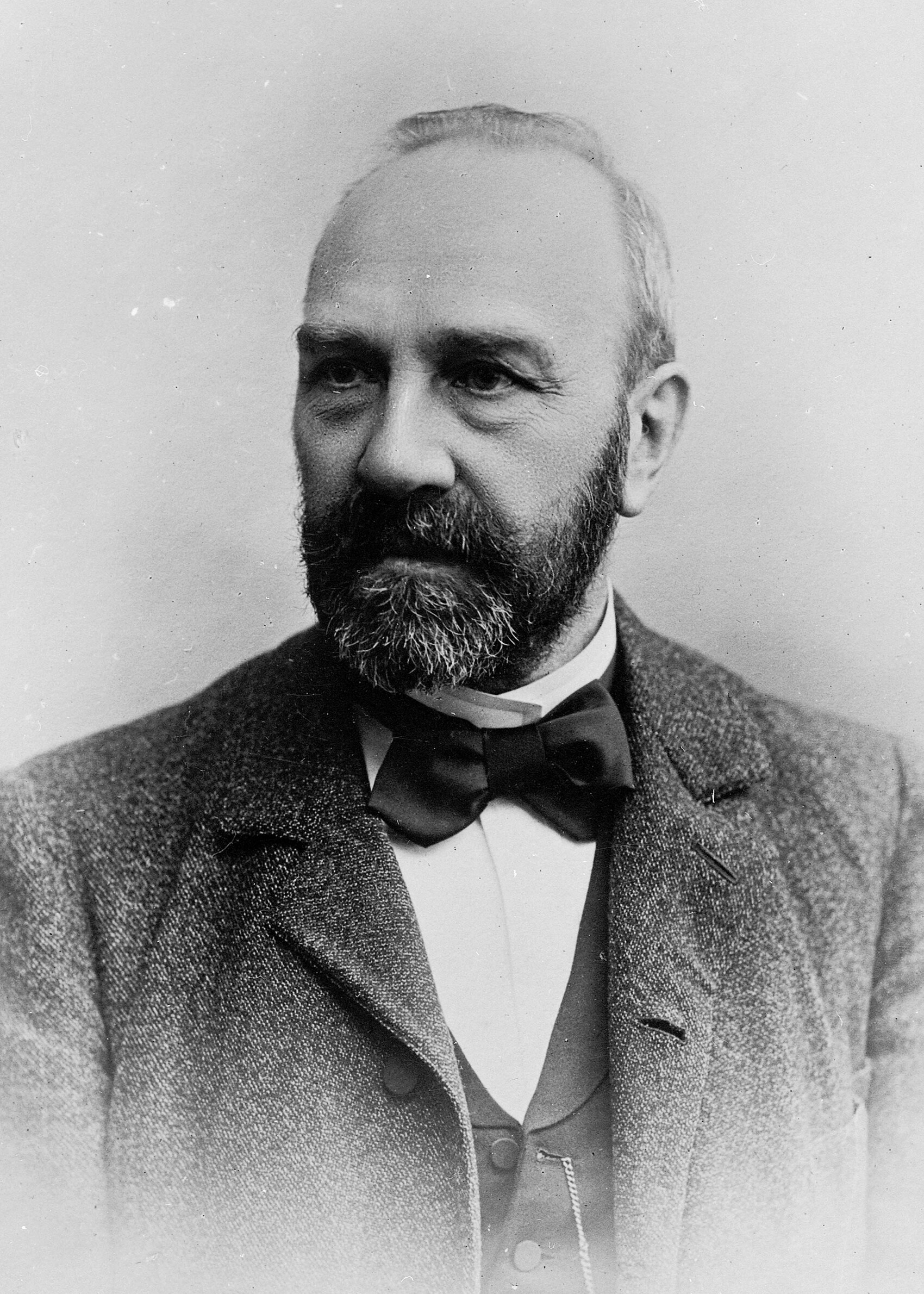
Prime Minister before	Prime Minister after
Hannibal Sehested; Højre	Johan Henrik Deuntzer; Venstre

Folketing elections were held in Denmark on 3 April 1901.

== Campaign ==
Eight of the 114 seats were uncontested, of which six were won by the Venstre Reform Party and two by the Social Democratic Party.

== Results ==
Party	Votes	%	Seats	+/–
Venstre Reform Party	96,481	42.87	76	+13
Højre	54,103	24.04	8	–8
Social Democratic Party	38,398	17.06	14	+2
Moderate Venstre	26,993	11.99	16	–7
Others	9,091	4.04	0	0
Total	225,066	100.00	114	0
Valid votes	225,066	98.46		
Invalid/blank votes	3,510	1.54		
Total votes	228,576	100.00		
Registered voters/turnout	404,271	56.54		
Source: Mackie & Rose
