= Ludvig Holstein-Ledreborg =

Danish politician (1839–1912)

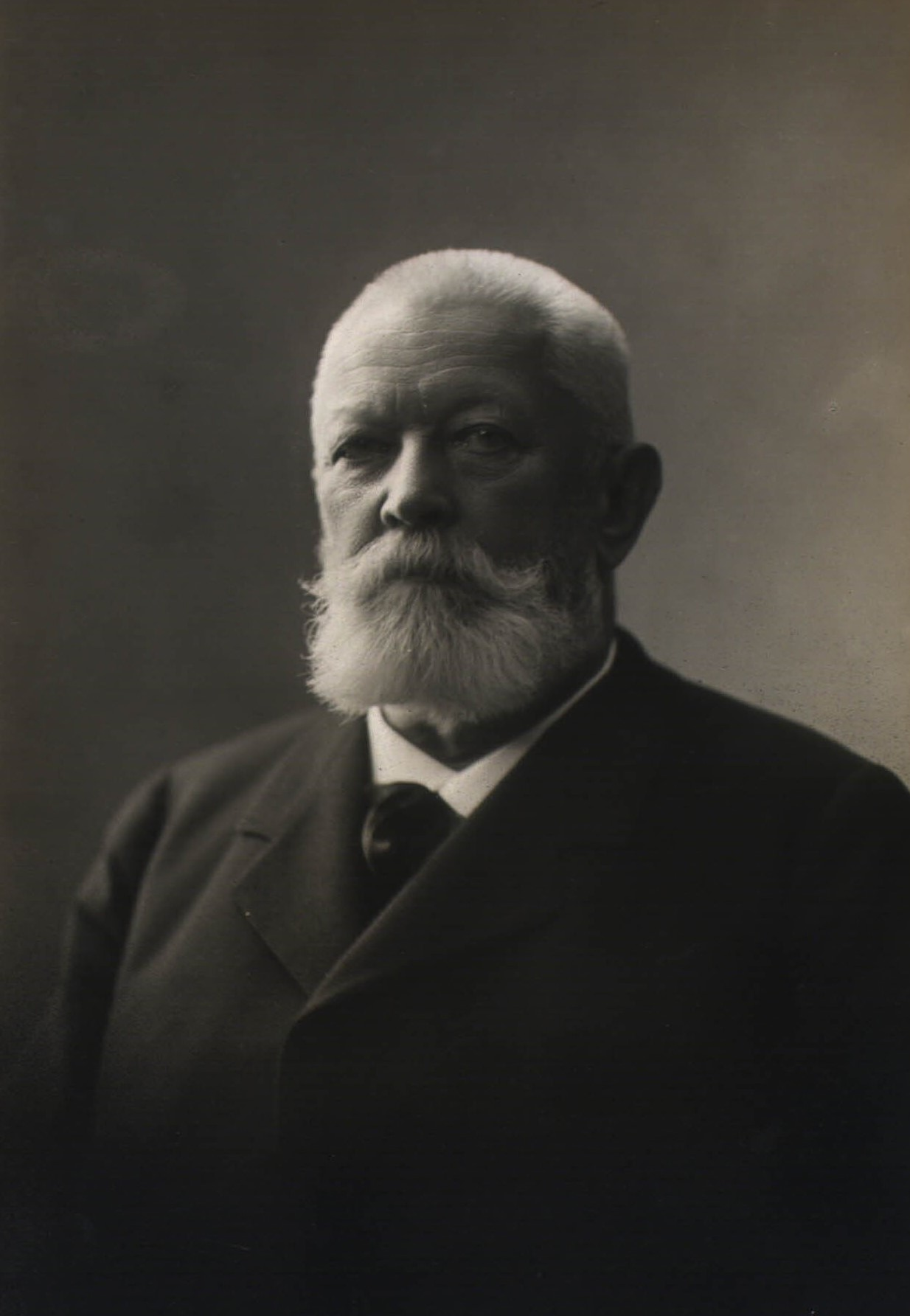

Council President of Denmark
- In office 16 August 1909 – 28 October 1909
- Monarch: Frederik VIII
- Preceded by: Niels Neergaard
- Succeeded by: Carl Theodor Zahle

Defence Minister of Denmark
- In office 18 October 1909 – 28 October 1909
- Preceded by: Jens Christian Christensen
- Succeeded by: Christopher Krabbe

Personal details
- Born: 10 June 1839 Hochberg (now Remseck am Neckar), Kingdom of Württemberg
- Died: 1 March 1912 (aged 72) Ledreborg
- Party: Moderate Venstre
- Education: University of Copenhagen

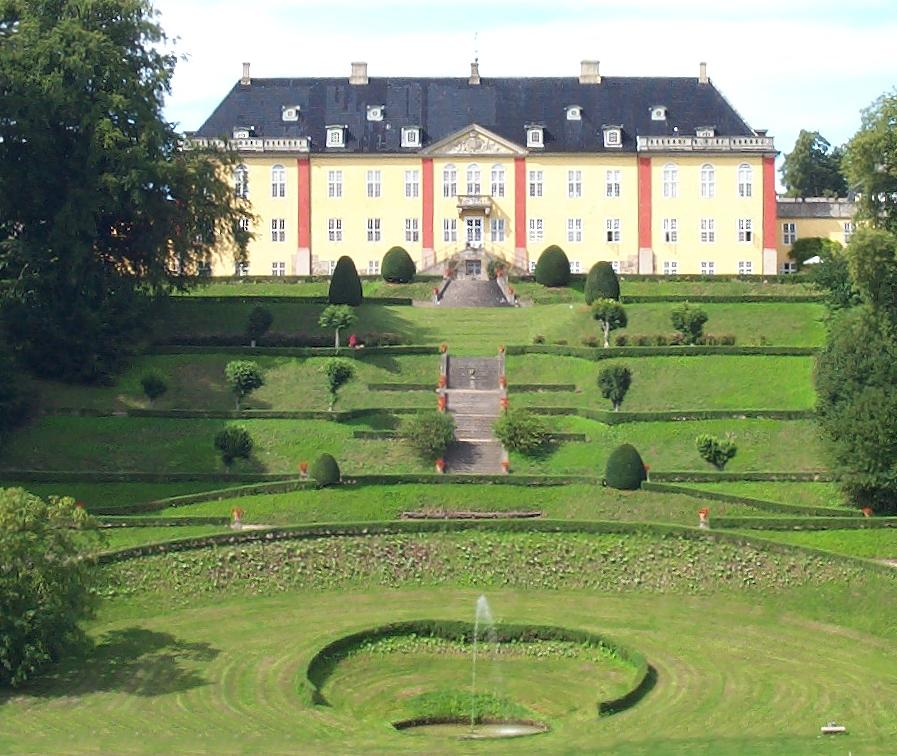
Ledreborg on Zealand

Count Johan Ludvig Carl Christian Tido of Holstein-Ledreborg (10 June 1839 – 1 March 1912), was a Danish politician who was Minister of State of Denmark. He was Council President of Denmark for two months, from 16 August to 28 October 1909. He also served as Defence Minister of Denmark from 18 October to 28 October 1909.

== Biography ==
Holstein was the son of Count Christian Edzard Moritz of Holstein-Ledreborg (1809–1895) and his wife, Countess Caroline Louise Lefeubre de Marpalu (1810–1903). He was a descendant of Danish Minister of State Count Johan Ludvig of Holstein–Ledreborg (1694–1763). He became a student at Roskilde Cathedral School in 1859 and became a Cand.polit. at the University of Copenhagen in 1866. He took over the Ledreborg estate after his father's death in 1895. He rebuilt the chapel at Ledreborg and also had the buildings and the garden restored.

== Prime minister ==
After the 1909 Folketing election produced no overall majority for any party, Klaus Berntsen suggested to Frederik VIII that Holstein might be able to gain the support of the three major liberal parties. The three Liberal groups settled on him as a prime minister, creating the first coalition since the establishment of the parliamentary system in Denmark. As prime minister, he formed a liberal cabinet with Jens Christian Christensen as defence minister, Niels Neergaard as finance minister, and Klaus Berntsen as minister of justice, and succeeded in achieving a compromise on the question of defence that satisfied the liberal parties, while still being acceptable to Højre.

As one of the few members of the Venstre Reform Party, the Danish Liberal party belonging to the nobility, Holstein was isolated by his colleagues and at the same time took a special position within Venstre. He was considered an outstanding and varied speaker and as one of "the five leaders of Venstre", but already 1890 he had retired from political life, devoting himself to his life as a squire on Zealand. Around two months into Holstein's term, conservative members of the Folketing called for a vote of no confidence in him, which failed. Shortly afterwards, the Radical Democrats called for a vote of no confidence in his cabinet. This vote succeeded, marking the first time that a Danish cabinet had been ousted by a vote of no confidence from the Folketing. He called upon the Radical Democrats to form a new cabinet because they had instigated the vote to oust the old cabinet, and proceeded to resign.

== Personal life ==
In 1867 he married Ingeborg Henriette de Løvenørn (1842–1915). Holstein converted to Catholicism that same year, which made him Denmark's first, and so far only, Roman Catholic Prime Minister.

== Descendants ==
His descendant (and heir of Ledreborg Castle) Count Knud Johann Holstein-Ledreborg married Princess Marie Gabrielle of Luxembourg, a daughter of Charlotte, Grand Duchess of Luxembourg. Another descendant was Countess Birgitte Holstein-Ledreborg, wife of Prince Jacques of Bourbon-Parma (son of Prince René of Bourbon-Parma and Princess Margaret of Denmark, and brother-in-law of King Michael of Romania).

Political offices
Preceded by Niels Thomasius Neergaard	Council President of Denmark; 16 August 1909 – 28 October 1909	Succeeded by Carl Theodor Zahle
Preceded by Jens Christian Christensen	Defence Minister of Denmark; 18 October 1909 – 28 October 1909	Succeeded by Christopher Krabbe
