= Charles Brun (Denmark) =

Danish politician

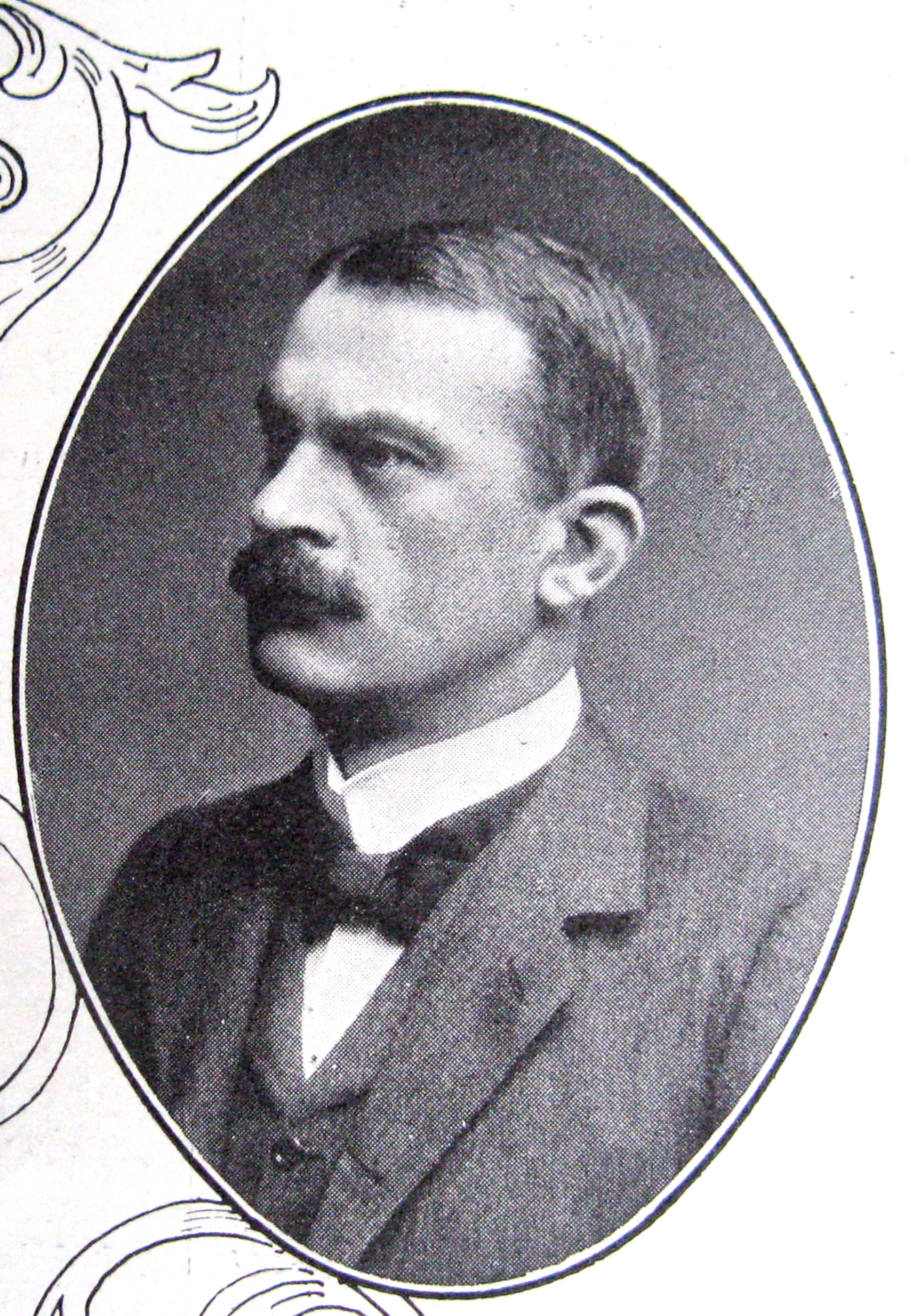
Charles Brun (Denmark).

Charles Brun (16 February 1866 in Copenhagen – 28 January 1919) was a Danish politician, representing the Venstre Reform Party in Parliament (Folketinget). He served as Finance Minister of Denmark in the Cabinet of Niels Neergaard I from October 12, 1908, to August 16, 1909.

Political offices
Preceded by Niels Neergaard	Finance Minister of Denmark; October 12, 1908 – August 16, 1909	Succeeded by Niels Neergaard
