= 1895 Danish Folketing election =

Election for the lower house of Danish Parliament

- 9 April 1895
- All 114 seats in the Folketing; 58 seats needed for a majority
Party	Leader	Seats	+/–
Venstre		53	+23
Højre	J.B.S. Estrup	25	−6
Moderate Venstre		27	−12
Social Democrats	Peter Christian Knudsen	8	+6
Independents	–	1	+1
This lists parties that won seats. See the complete results below.

Folketing elections were held in Denmark on 9 April 1895.

== Results ==
Party	Votes	%	Seats	+/–
Venstre Reform Party	89,530		53	+24
Højre	64,395		25	–6
Moderate Venstre	42,635		27	–12
Social Democratic Party	24,510		8	+6
Independents			1	+1
Total			114	+12
Registered voters/turnout	376,350	60.2		
Source: Nohlen & Stöver (voters/turnout)
