= Edvard Brandes =

Danish politician, critic and author (1847–1931)

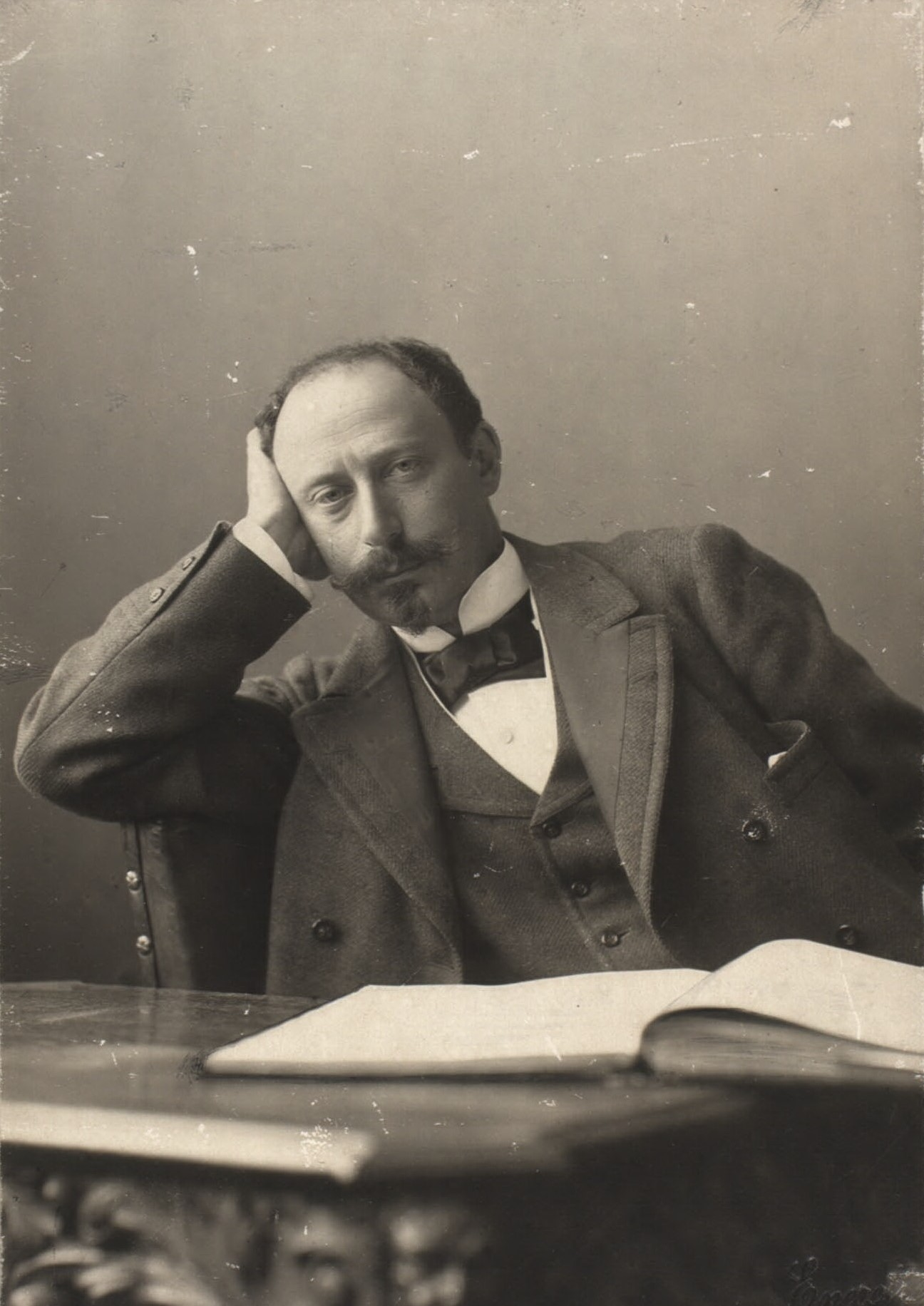

Minister of Finance
- In office 21 June 1913 – 30 March 1920
- Prime Minister: Carl Theodor Zahle
- Preceded by: Niels Neergaard
- Succeeded by: Hans Peter Hjerl Hansen
- In office 28 October 1909 – 5 July 1910
- Prime Minister: Carl Theodor Zahle
- Preceded by: Niels Neergaard
- Succeeded by: Niels Neergaard

Personal details
- Born: Carl Edvard Cohen Brandes; 21 October 1847
- Died: 20 December 1931 (aged 84)
- Party: Danish Social Liberal Party
- Relatives: Georg Brandes; Ernst Brandes

Carl Edvard Cohen Brandes (21 October 1847 – 20 December 1931) was a Danish politician, critic and author, and the younger brother of Georg Brandes and Ernst Brandes. He had a Ph.D. in eastern philology.

== Biography ==
Brandes was a member of the Folketing for the party Venstre from 1880 to 1894. Along with Viggo Hørup and Christen Berg, Brandes was editor of the newspaper "Morgenbladet" (literally "the morning paper"), which was associated with the party, from 1880 to 1883, when Berg fired Brandes and Hørup over a conflict on the points of view that the newspaper voiced. In 1884, he cofounded the newspaper Politiken with Hørup and Hermann Bang. Brandes used his position within the newspaper to promote literature that supported his own political point of view and to criticize literature which contained nationalliberal or Grundtvigian points of view, often in direct conflict with his opinion of their quality, but nevertheless he played a significant part in reforming literary criticism in Denmark.

He joined the party Det Radikale Venstre shortly after its founding in 1905, and he was a member of the Landsting for the party from the 1906 election until 1927. He was Minister of Finance from 1909 to 1910 and again from 1913 to 1920 as a member of the Cabinets of Zahle I and II.

He was the father-in-law of Norwegian chemist Georg Dedichen, and brother-in-law of Mette-Sophie Gad the wife of French artist Paul Gauguin

Political offices
Preceded by Niels Neergaard	Finance Minister of Denmark; 28 October 1909 – 5 July 1910	Succeeded by Niels Neergaard
Preceded by Niels Neergaard	Finance Minister of Denmark; 21 June 1913 – 30 March 1920	Succeeded by Hans Peter Hjerl Hansen
