= Niels Neergaard =

Danish historian and political figure (1854-1936)

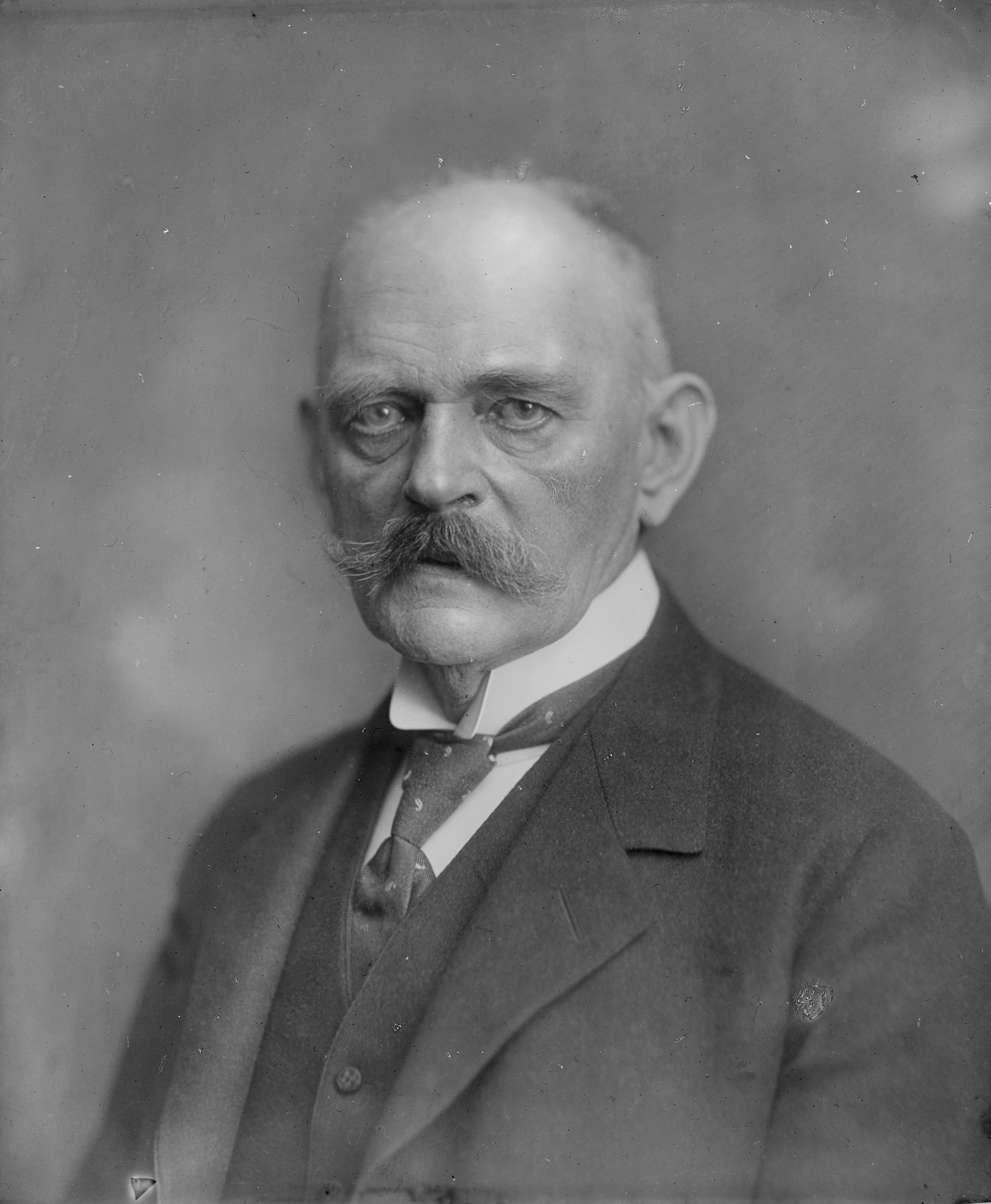

Prime Minister of Denmark
- In office 5 May 1920 – 23 April 1924
- Monarch: Christian X
- Preceded by: Michael Pedersen Friis
- Succeeded by: Thorvald Stauning

Council President of Denmark
- In office 12 October 1908 – 16 August 1909
- Monarch: Frederik VIII
- Preceded by: Jens Christian Christensen
- Succeeded by: Ludvig Holstein-Ledreborg

Minister for Finance
- In office 14 December 1926 – 30 April 1929
- Prime Minister: Thomas Madsen-Mygdal
- Preceded by: Carl Valdemar Bramsnæs
- Succeeded by: Carl Valdemar Bramsnæs
- In office 5 May 1920 – 23 April 1924
- Prime Minister: Himself
- Preceded by: Michael Kofoed
- Succeeded by: Carl Valdemar Bramsnæs
- In office 5 July 1910 – 21 June 1913
- Prime Minister: Klaus Berntsen
- Preceded by: Edvard Brandes
- Succeeded by: Edvard Brandes
- In office 16 August 1909 – 28 October 1909
- Prime Minister: Ludvig Holstein-Ledreborg
- Preceded by: Charles Brun
- Succeeded by: Edvard Brandes

Minister of Defence
- In office 12 October 1908 – 16 September 1909
- Prime Minister: Himself; Ludvig Holstein-Ledreborg
- Preceded by: Jens Christian Christensen
- Succeeded by: Jens Christian Christensen

Personal details
- Born: 27 June 1854 Ugilt, Hjørring, Denmark
- Died: 2 September 1936 (aged 82) Copenhagen, Denmark
- Party: Moderate Venstre; Venstre
- Education: University of Copenhagen

Niels Thomasius Neergaard (27 June 1854 – 2 September 1936) was a Danish historian and political figure, a member of the Liberal Moderate Venstre and since 1910 of Venstre. He served as Council President of Denmark between 1908 and 1909 and as Prime Minister of Denmark and Finance Minister from 1920 to 1924. He was also minister of defence from 1908 to 1909, and finance minister on three more occasions: August to October 1909, 1910 to 1913 and 1926 to 1929.

== Biography ==
Neergaard was educated at the University of Copenhagen, from which he attained the degrees cand.mag. in history and cand.polit. in 1879 and 1881, respectively.

Neergaard's greatest challenges as a politician were as prime minister and finance minister after the Easter Crisis of 1920, organizing the return of South Jutland to Danish rule and having to deal with the economic crisis brought on by World War I. He also had a significant influence on the content of the Constitution of 1915.

Neergaard's largest work as a historian, Under junigrundloven (1892-1916), is still considered the primary work on Danish politics 1848–1866. In addition to his political activities and work as a historian he also dealt with journalism, and in 1884 he founded a cultural and literary magazine, Tilskueren.

Political offices
Preceded by Vilhelm Lassen	Finance Minister of Denmark; 24 July 1908 – 12 October 1908	Succeeded by Charles Brun
Preceded by Jens Christian Christensen	Council President of Denmark; 12 October 1908 – 16 August 1909	Succeeded by Ludvig Holstein-Ledreborg
Preceded by Jens Christian Christensen	Defence Minister of Denmark; 12 October 1908 – 16 August 1909	Succeeded by Jens Christian Christensen
Preceded by Charles Brun	Finance Minister of Denmark; 16 August 1909 – 28 October 1909	Succeeded by Edvard Brandes
Preceded by Edvard Brandes	Finance Minister of Denmark; 5 July 1910 – 21 June 1913	Succeeded by Edvard Brandes
Preceded by Michael Pedersen Friis	Prime Minister of Denmark; 5 May 1920 – 23 April 1924	Succeeded by Thorvald Stauning
Preceded by A.M. Koefoed	Finance Minister of Denmark; 5 May 1920 – 23 April 1924	Succeeded by Carl Valdemar Bramsnæs
Preceded by Carl Valdemar Bramsnæs	Finance Minister of Denmark; 14 December 1926 – 30 April 1929	Succeeded by Carl Valdemar Bramsnæs
