= 1929 Danish local elections =

Regional elections were held in Denmark in March 1929. 11329 municipal council members were elected.

== Results of regional elections ==
The results of the regional elections:

=== Municipal Councils ===
Party	Seats
Venstre	2,615
Social Democrats	1,957
Danish Social Liberal Party	1,237
Conservative People's Party	626
Others	4,125
Outside election	769
Total	11,329
