= 1946 Danish local elections =

Regional elections were held in Denmark on 12 March 1946. 11488 municipal council members were elected, as well as 299 members of the amts of Denmark.

== Results ==
The results of the regional elections:

=== Amt Councils ===
Party	Seats
Venstre	139
Social Democrats	94
Conservative People's Party	31
Danish Social Liberal Party	27
Justice Party of Denmark	1
Communist Party of Denmark	1
Schleswig Party	1
Others	5
Total	299

=== Municipal Councils ===
Party	Seats
Social Democrats	2,975
Venstre	2,519
Danish Social Liberal Party	870
Conservative People's Party	592
Communist Party of Denmark	119
Others	4,274
Outside election	139
Total	11,488
