= 1925 Danish local elections =

Regional elections were held in Denmark in March 1925. 11289 municipal council members were elected.

== Results of regional elections ==
The results of the regional elections:

=== Municipal Councils ===
Party	Seats
Venstre	2,291
Social Democrats	1,840
Danish Social Liberal Party	1,069
Conservative People's Party	332
Others	4,947
Outside election	810
Total	11,289
