= 1933 Danish local elections =

Regional elections were held in Denmark in March 1933. 11424 municipal council members were elected.

== Results of regional elections ==
The results of the regional elections:

=== Municipal Councils ===
Party	Seats
Venstre	2,692
Social Democrats	2,218
Danish Social Liberal Party	1,160
Conservative People's Party	543
Others	3,945
Outside election	866
Total	11,424
