= 1958 Danish local elections =

Regional elections were held in Denmark on 4 March 1958. 11529 municipal council members were elected, as well as 303 members of the amts of Denmark.

== Results of regional elections ==
The results of the regional elections:

=== Amt Councils ===
Party	Seats
Liberals (Venstre) (D)	135
Social Democrats (Socialdemokratiet) (A)	96
Conservative People's Party (Det Konservative Folkeparti) (C)	39
Social Liberal Party (Det Radikale Venstre) (B)	26
Schleswig Party (Slesvigsk Parti) (S)	3
Justice Party of Denmark (Retsforbundet) (E)	1
Others	3
Total	303

=== Municipal Councils ===
Party	Seats
Social Democrats (Socialdemokratiet) (A)	3023
Liberals (Venstre) (V)	2405
Social Liberal Party (Det Radikale Venstre) (B)	648
Conservative People's Party (Det Konservative Folkeparti) (C)	603
Communist Party (Kommunistiske Parti) (K)	26
Justice Party of Denmark (Retsforbundet) (E)	25
Others	4685
Outside election	114
Total	11529
