= May 1881 Danish Folketing election =

Election for the lower house of Danish Parliament

- 24 May 1881
- Turnout: 47.8%
Party	Seats	+/–
Liberals	69	+4
Højre	33	−4
This lists parties that won seats. See the complete results below.

Folketing elections were held in Denmark on 24 May 1881. Liberals retained their majority, whilst voter turnout was around 48%.

== Results ==
Party	Votes	%	Seats	+/–
Liberals			69	+4
Højre			33	–4
Total			102	0
Registered voters/turnout	306,601	47.8		
Source: Nohlen & Stöver
