= 1935 Danish local elections =

Regional elections were held in Denmark in March 1935. 299 members of the county councils of Denmark were elected.

== Results of regional elections ==
The results of the regional elections:

=== Amt Councils ===
Party	Votes	%	Seats
Venstre	217,375	37.72	124
Social Democrats	149,896	26.01	85
Conservative People's Party	85,808	14.89	40
Danish Social Liberal Party	65,641	11.39	27
Farmers' Party	16,270	2.82	6
Justice Party of Denmark	15,408	2.67	1
National Socialist Workers' Party	9,634	1.67	3
Schleswig Party	4,737	0.82	6
Communist Party of Denmark	824	0.14	–
Others	10,715	1.86	7
Total	576,308	100.00	299
Registered voters/turnout	858,970	–	
Source: Danmarks Statistik
