= July 1881 Danish Folketing election =

Election for the lower house of Danish Parliament

- 26 July 1881
- Turnout: 55.6%
Party	Seats	+/–
Liberals	75	+6
Højre	27	−6
This lists parties that won seats. See the complete results below.

Folketing elections were held in Denmark on 26 July 1881. Liberals won the largest number of seats, whilst voter turnout was around 56%.

== Results ==
Party	Votes	%	Seats	+/–
Liberals			75	+6
Højre			27	–6
Total			102	0
Registered voters/turnout	307,061	55.6		
Source: Nohlen & Stöver
