= Social Democrats (Denmark) =

Centre-left Danish political party

Social Democrats Socialdemokratiet
- Abbreviation: S A (Note: Official party letter on voting ballot.)
- Chairperson: Mette Frederiksen
- Deputy chairs: Lennart Damsbo-Andersen; Christian Rabjerg Madsen
- Founder: Louis Pio
- Founded: 15 October 1871; 155 years ago
- Headquarters: Vester Voldgade 96 1552, Copenhagen
- Newspaper: Socialdemokraten
- Student wing: Frit Forum – Social Democratic Students of Denmark
- Youth wing: Social Democratic Youth of Denmark
- Membership (2020): 32,137
- Ideology: Social democracy
- Political position: Centre-left
- European affiliation: Party of European Socialists
- European Parliament group: Progressive Alliance of Socialists and Democrats
- International affiliation: Progressive Alliance; Socialist International (1951–2017)
- Nordic affiliation: SAMAK; The Social Democratic Group
- Colours: Red
- Anthem: "Når jeg ser et rødt flag smælde" ('When I see a red flag billow')
- Folketing (Note: Only 175 of the 179 seats in the Danish Parliament, the Folketing, are obtainable by Danish political parties as Greenland and the Faroe Islands are assigned two seats each due to their status as territories in the Kingdom of Denmark.): 38 / 179
- European Parliament: 3 / 15
- Regions: 36 / 205
- Municipalities: 599 / 2,436
- Mayors: 26 / 98

Election symbol

Website
- socialdemokratiet.dk
- Politics of Denmark; Political parties; Elections; A: The party has also been described as left-conservative, given its more conservative stances on some socio-cultural issues.

The Social Democrats (Danish: Socialdemokratiet [soˈɕɛˀlte̝moˌkʰʁɑˀtɪət], lit. 'The Social Democracy', S) is a social democratic political party in Denmark. A member of the Party of European Socialists, the Social Democrats have 38 out of 179 members of the Folketing (following the latest Danish general election held in 2026) and three out of 14 MEPs elected from Denmark.

Founded by Louis Pio in 1871, the party first entered the Folketing in the 1884 Danish Folketing election. By the early 20th century, it had become the party with the largest representation in the Folketing, a distinction it would hold for 77 years. It first formed a government after the 1924 Danish Folketing election under Thorvald Stauning, the longest-serving Danish Prime Minister of the 20th century. During Stauning's government which lasted until the 1926 Danish Folketing election, the Social Democrats exerted a profound influence on Danish society, laying the foundation of the Danish welfare state. From 2002 to 2016, the party used the name Socialdemokraterne in some contexts. The party was a member of the Labour and Socialist International from 1923 to 1940. A member of the Socialist International until 2017, the party withdrew to join the Progressive Alliance, founded in 2013.

The party was the major coalition partner in government from the 2011 Danish general election until the 2015 Danish general election, with then-party leader Helle Thorning-Schmidt as Prime Minister. After losing power in the 2015 election, Thorning-Schmidt was succeeded as party leader on 28 June 2015 by the former Vice Leader Mette Frederiksen, who shifted the party back to the political left on economics, while criticising mass immigration. Frederiksen led the party to win the 2019, 2022, and 2026 Danish general election forming a single-party minority government from 2019 to 2022, a majority grand-coalition government with the centre-right Venstre and the centrist Moderates from 2022 to 2026 and a centre-left minority coalition government since 2026.

== Overview ==
The party traces its own history back to the International Labour Association, founded in 1871 and banned in 1873, loosely re-organised in the Social Democratic Labour Party which in 1876 issued the Gimle program, but as a formal political party it was first founded from 11–12 February 1878 as the Social Democratic Federation. This name was formally carried by the party for almost a hundred years, although in practice it also used a number of other names until it changed its name to Social Democracy in 1965. At a congress in Aalborg in 2002, the party changed its name to the Social Democrats, but from 2016 again only Social Democracy is used.

The party has the letter A as a symbol, but the abbreviation S is often used in the media. The party's classic symbol is a red rose and in recent times an A in a red circle. Aside from the classical socialist red colour, the party has recently adopted a more light red colour called competition orange. The party was a member of the Labour and Socialist International between 1923 and 1940. It is now a member of the Progressive Alliance, an association of progressive social-democratic parties. The Social Democrats are also a member of the Party of European Socialists while the party's MEPs sit in the Socialists & Democrats group.

== History ==
=== 19th century ===
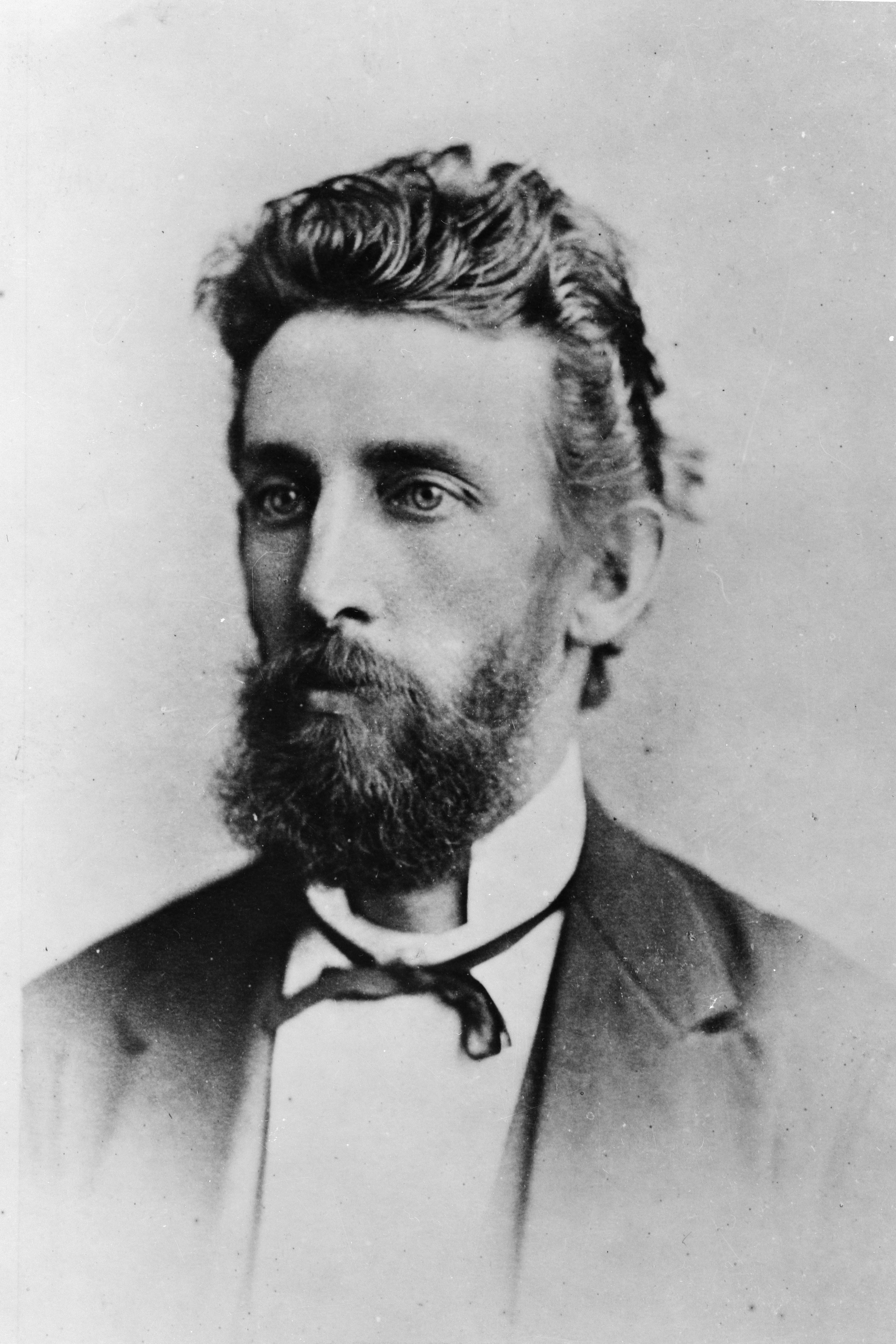
Socialist pioneer Louis Pio, founder and first leader of the Social Democrats (1871–1872) and 1875–1877)

The party was founded as the International Labour Association of Denmark on 15 October 1871 by Louis Pio, Harald Brix and Paul Geleff. The goal was to organise the emerging working class on a democratic and socialist basis. The industrialisation of Denmark had begun in the mid-19th century and a period of rapid urbanisation had led to an emerging class of urban workers. The social-democratic movement emerged from the desire to give this group political rights and representation in the Folketing, the Danish parliament. In 1876, the party held an annual conference, adopting the first party manifesto.

The stated policy was as follows:

The Danish Social Democratic Labour Party works in its national form, but is convinced of the international nature of the labour movement and ready to sacrifice everything and fulfill all obligations to provide: Freedom, equality and brotherhood among all nations.

In 1884, the party had their first two members of parliament elected, namely Peter Thygesen Holm and Chresten Hørdum.

=== 20th century ===
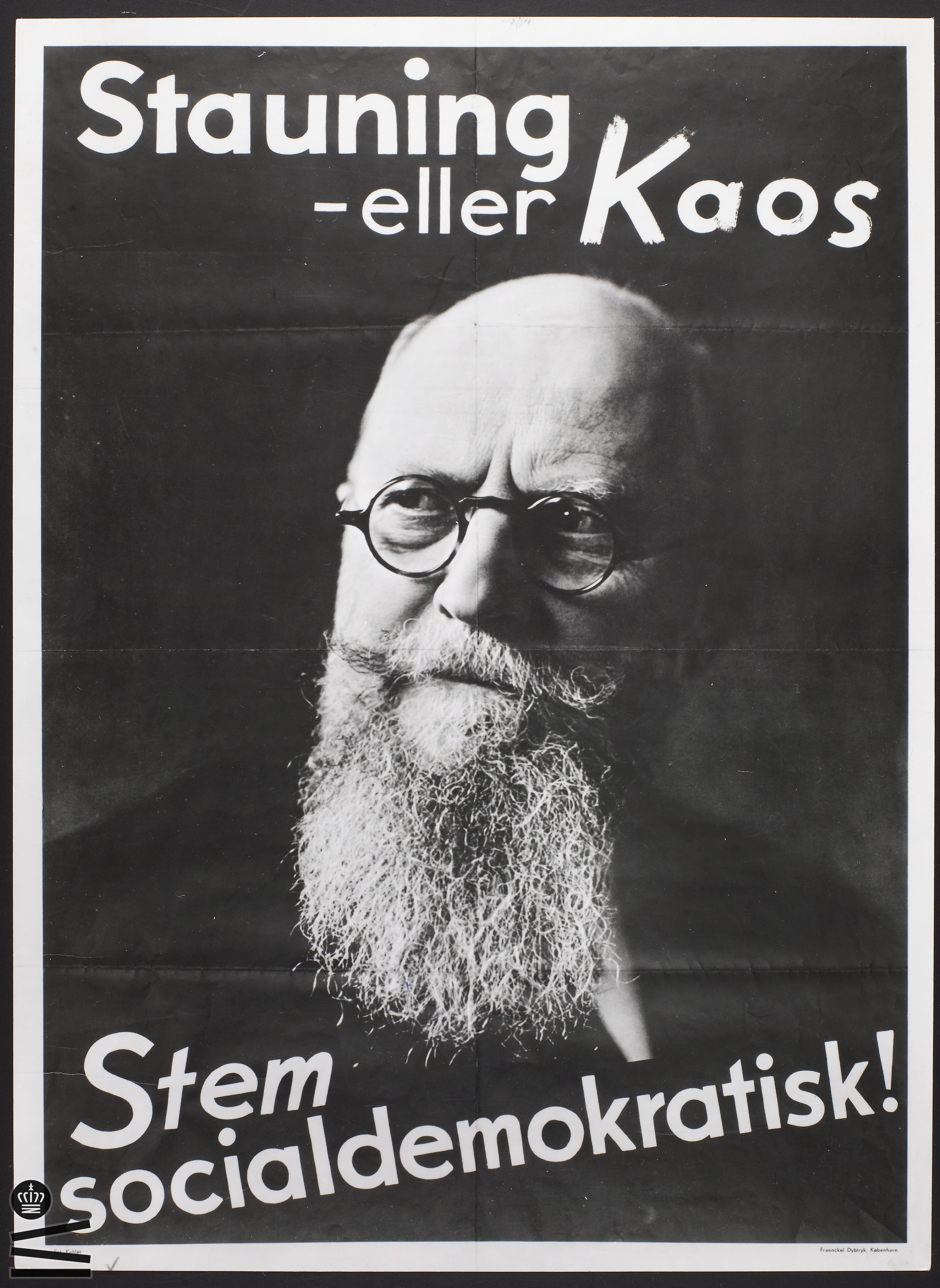
Thorvald Stauning, the party's first Prime Minister (1924–1926 and 1929–1942) on his 1935 Stauning or Chaos election poster

In 1906, the party created the Social Democratic Youth Association, lasting until 1920 when the Social Democratic Youth of Denmark and current party's youth wing was founded. In the 1924 Danish Folketing election, the party won the majority with 36.6 percent of the vote and its first government was put in place with Thorvald Stauning as Prime Minister. That same year, he appointed Nina Bang as the world's first female minister, nine years after women's suffrage had been given in Denmark. Stauning stayed in power until his death in 1942, with his party laying the foundations for the Danish welfare state based on a close collaboration between labor unions and the government.

In January 1933, Stauning's government entered into what was then the most extensive settlement yet in Danish politics, namely the Kanslergade settlement (Danish: Kanslergadeforliget) with the liberal party Venstre. The settlement was named after Stauning's apartment in Kanslergade in Copenhagen and included extensive agricultural subsidies and reforms of the legislation and administration in the social sector. In 1935, Stauning was reelected with the famous slogan "Stauning or Chaos". Stauning's second cabinet lasted until the Nazi occupation of Denmark in 1940, when the cabinet was widened to include all political parties for a national unity government and the Danish government pursued a collaborative policy with the German occupiers. Through the 1940s and until 1972, most of Denmark's Prime Ministers were from the party.

=== Poul Nyrup Rasmussen government coalition: 1993–2001 ===
Social Democrats election poster for the October 1945 general election

The Social Democrats' social policy through the 1990s and continuing in the 21st century involved a significant redistribution of income and the maintenance of a large state apparatus with collectively financed core public services such as public healthcare, education and infrastructure. Social Democrats-led coalition governments (the I, II, III and IV Cabinets of Poul Nyrup Rasmussen) implemented the system known as flexicurity (flexibility and social security), mixing strong Scandinavian unemployment benefits with deregulated employment laws, making it easier for employers to fire and rehire people in order to encourage economic growth and reduce unemployment.

The Cabinets of Poul Nyrup Rasmussen maintained a parliamentary majority during the period from 1993 to 2001 by virtue of their support from the Socialist People's Party and the Red–Green Alliance. Towards the end of the 1990s, a trade surplus of 30 billion kroner (US$4.9 billion) turned into a deficit. To combat this, the government increased taxes, limiting private consumption. The 1998 initiative, dubbed the Whitsun Packet (Danish: Pinsepakken) from the season it was issued, was not universally popular with the electorate; it may have also been a factor in the Social Democrats' defeat in the 2001 Danish general election.

=== In opposition: 2001–2011 ===
After being defeated by the Liberal Party in the 2001 Danish general election, the party chairmanship went to former finance and foreign minister Mogens Lykketoft. Following another defeat in the 2005 Danish general election, Lykketoft announced his resignation as party leader and at an extraordinary congress on 12 March it was decided that all members of the party would cast votes in an election of a new party leader. The two contenders for the leadership represented the two wings in the party, with Helle Thorning-Schmidt being viewed as centrist and Frank Jensen being viewed as slightly more left-leaning. On 12 April 2005, Thorning-Schmidt was elected as the new leader.

=== Helle Thorning-Schmidt government coalition: 2011–2015 ===
In the 2011 Danish general election, the Social Democrats gained 44 seats in Parliament, the lowest number since 1953. Nonetheless, the party succeeded in establishing a minority government with the Danish Social Liberal Party and the Socialist People's Party. The incumbent centre-right coalition led by the Liberal Party lost power to a centre-left coalition led by the Social Democrats, making Thorning-Schmidt the country's first female prime minister. The Danish Social Liberal Party and the Socialist People's Party became part of the three-party centre-left coalition government. The new parliament convened on 4 October. The government rolled back anti-immigration legislation enacted by the previous government and passed a tax-reform with support from the liberal-conservative opposition. The tax reform raised the top tax threshold, which had previously applied to over half the working population. The aim of the tax reform was to increase labour output to fend off a projected labour shortage within the next decades. The stated goal was to entice Danes to work more in order to compensate for the decreasing workforce by lowering tax on wages and gradually lowering welfare payments to those outside of the labour market to increase the economic benefit of working relative to receiving welfare.

On 3 February 2014, the Socialist People's Party left the government in protest over the sale of shares in the public energy company DONG Energy to the investment bank Goldman Sachs. Because of the government's minority status and of its dependency on the support of the Danish Social Liberal Party, the government had to jettison many of the policies that the Social Democrats–Socialist People's Party coalition had given during the campaign. Although critics have accused the government of breaking its promises, other studies argue that it accomplished half of its stated goals, blaming instead poor public relations strategies for its increasingly negative public image. The government pursued a centrist compromise agenda, building several reforms with support from both sides of the parliament. This caused friction with the supporting Red–Green Alliance, who were kept outside of influencing decisions.

=== In opposition: 2015–2019 ===
In the 2015 Danish general election, the Social Democrats gained seats and became the biggest party in Parliament again since 2001, yet lost the government because the right-wing parties had a majority. The results of the 2015 election and the defeat of the left-bloc led Thorning-Schmidt to resign as prime minister on election night and making way for the next leader Mette Frederiksen. Under Frederiksen, the Social Democrats voted in favor of a law allowing Danish authorities to confiscate money, jewellery and other valuable items refugees crossing the border may have as long as those valuables have no sentimental value, despite harsh condemnation from the United Nations Human Right Council and widespread comparisons between the plan and the treatment of Jews in Nazi-occupied Europe. The law had been used 17 times in the first six years.

Similarly, the Social Democrats voted for a law banning wearing of burqas and niqabs, while abstaining during a vote on a law on mandatory handshakes irrespective of religious sentiment at citizenship ceremonies and on a plan to house criminal asylum seekers on an island used for researching contagious animal diseases. Frederiksen has also backed the right-wing populist Danish People's Party in their paradigm shift push to make repatriation rather than social integration the goal of asylum policy. She has called for a cap on non-Western immigrants, expulsion of asylum seekers to a reception centre in North Africa and forced labour for immigrants in exchange for benefits. Labeling foreign policies of Europe as too economic liberal, Frederiksen has criticised other social democratic parties for losing their voters' trust by failing to prevent globalisation chipping away at labour rights, increasing inequality and exposing them to uncontrolled immigration.

=== 2019–present: Frederiksen I, II and III ===
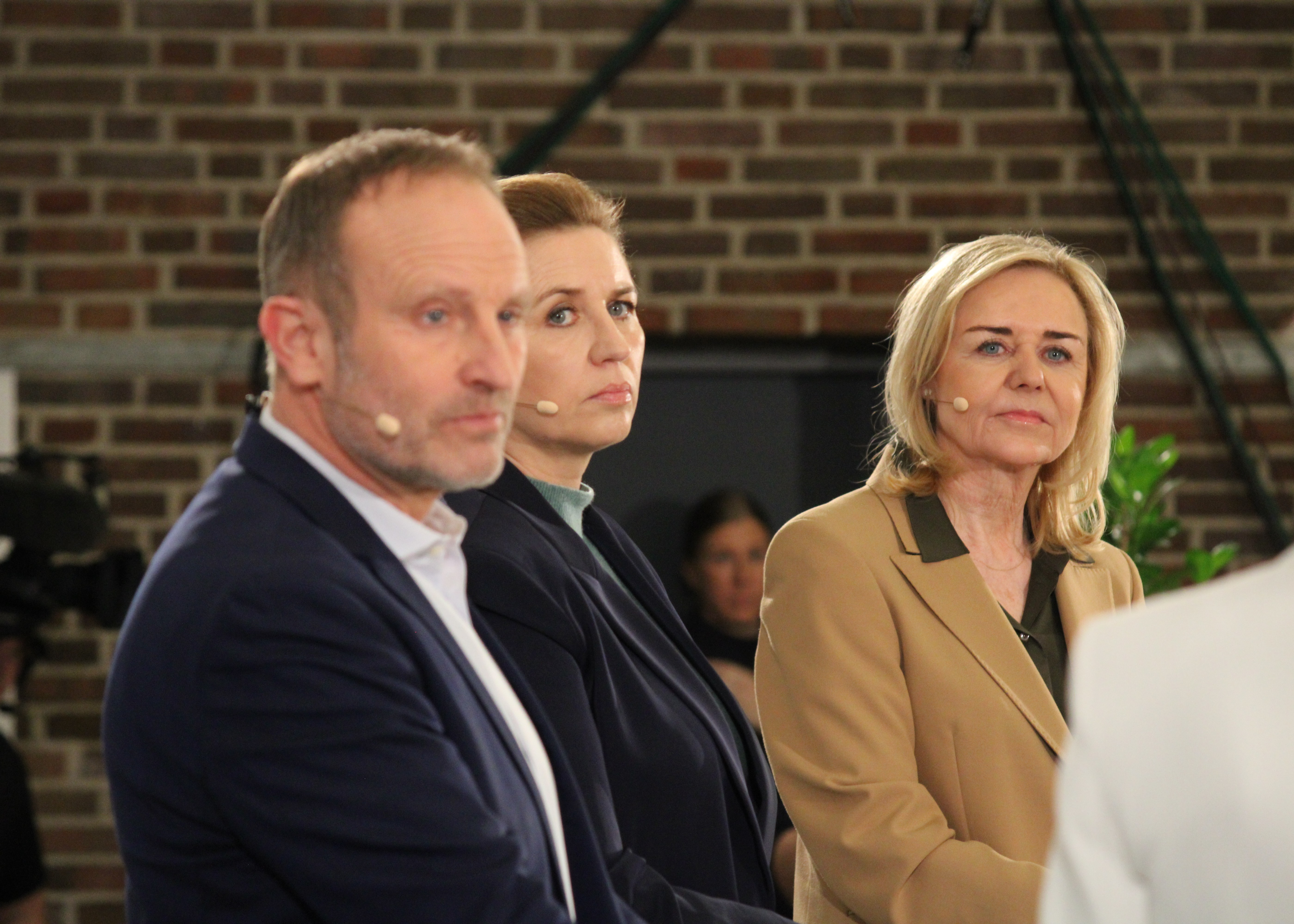
Mette Frederiksen during a debate with Martin Lidegaard and Mona Juul in Nyborg, January 2026

In the 2019 Danish general election, the Social Democrats gained one further seat and the opposition red bloc of left-wing and centre-left parties (the Social Democrats, the Danish Social Liberal Party, the Socialist People's Party and the Red–Green Alliance along with the Faroese Social Democratic Party and Greenland's Inuit Ataqatigiit and Siumut) won a majority of 93 out of 179 seats in the Folketing while support for the Danish People's Party and the Liberal Alliance collapsed, costing Lars Løkke Rasmussen his majority. With the result beyond doubt on election night, Rasmussen conceded defeat and Frederiksen has been commissioned by Queen Margrethe II to lead the negotiations to form a new government.

On 27 June 2019, Frederiksen was successful in forming the Frederiksen Cabinet, an exclusively Social Democrats minority government supported by the red bloc, becoming the second woman in the role after Thorning-Schmidt as well as the youngest prime minister in Danish history at the age of 41. Despite having run on an anti-immigration stance during the election, Frederiksen shifted her stance on immigration by allowing more foreign labour and reversing government plans to hold foreign criminals offshore after winning government.

In the 2022 Danish general election, the Social Democrats gained 2 more seats with more than twice the number of seats of any other party. This led to the formation of the Frederiksen II cabinet, which included the Social Democrats, the Liberal Party and the newly formed Moderates, being a cross-bloc government. This marked the first time in more than 40 years that the Social Democrats and the Liberal Party, two historical political rivals, have been together in a government.

In the 2025 Danish local elections, the Social Democrats suffered significant losses, and losing in Copenhagen after more than 100 years. In the 2026 Danish general election, the Social Democrats lost 12 seats, their worst result since 1903. However, the Social Democrats remained the largest party in the Folketing.

== Platform ==
Since its foundation, the motto of the party has been "Liberty, Equality, Fraternity" and these values are still described as central in the party program. In the political program, these values are described as being consistent with a focus on solidarity with the poorest and social welfare to those who need it, with individual responsibility in relation to other members in society and with an increased involvement in the European Union project.

As well as adopting more left-leaning economics, the party has become increasingly sceptical of immigration from the late 2010s. The party believes that immigration has had negative consequences for much of the population, a more pressing issue since at least 2001 after the 11 September attacks which intensified during the 2015 European migrant crisis. It also returned to a more sceptical view of economic liberalism, arguing that its adherence to Third Way politics, its application of centrist and neoliberal economics, and supporting unrestricted economic globalisation contributed to the party's poor electoral performance in the late 2000s and early 2010s.

The party is described as anti-globalisation, anti-immigrant, and critical of Islam. According to the party, Muslim immigrants do not respect the Danish judicial system, Muslim women abstain from working for religious reasons, and they are also subject to "massive social control" in their immigrant communities. In a biography written before becoming the prime minister in 2019, Mette Frederiksen wrote: "For me, it is becoming increasingly clear that the price of unregulated globalisation, mass immigration and the free movement of labour is paid for by the lower classes." Frederiksen combined opposition to immigration and support for social cohesion with criticism of globalisation, wealth inequality and erosion of workers' rights. Economist Mark Blyth wrote that under Frederiksen, the Danish Social Democrats have "torn up the neoliberal rule book" in favor of combining increased government spending with immigration controls.

The party had factions that promoted anti-immigration policies since the 1980s, but it was Mette Frederiksen that completed the party's right-turn on immigration. Since then, Social Democrats have been supporting strict controls of immigration, arguing that it is integral to "a new class struggle" as it protects the national culture, rural communities and the working-class identities of Denmark. The party's proposals include expulsion of asylum seekers, a cap on non-Western immigration, and a requirement for immigrants to work at least 37 hours per week before being given a right to social and welfare benefits. It links immigration to sexual violence, trafficking and erosion of Danish culture. The party also legally obliged rejected asylum applicants to reside in "return centres" and be excluded from the Danish labour market. The party justified the strict migration policy as a defence of Denmark's strong welfare state, with the 2026 party programme stating that "we must distinguish between those who can and want to (belong to) Denmark, and those who do not."

Social Democrats adopted a conservative stance on cultural diversity, supporting repatriation rather than integration, postulating a ban on burqas and niqabs, and voting in favour of a law allowing Danish authorities to confiscate valuable items from refugees crossing the border. It also implemented a ban on room prayers in schools, strict requirements for family reunions, and a "ghetto plan", where immigrant areas designated as "ghettos" were given special regulation such as doubled punishments for certain crimes, easier access to personal information of residents for state authorities, and obligatory day care institutions for children (with non-attendance resulting in welfare grants cuts). The party is considered to have "moved strongly to the center" on other cultural issues; it makes no mention of gender and racial equality in its ideological declarations.

These stances were compared to the ones of radical right parties and argued to have made them mainstream, with critics suggesting that the far-right was slowed at a high cost in terms of tolerance, as also reflected in polling in a country that was more tolerant compared to other European countries. Rune Stubager, a political science professor at Aarhus University, argued that the move had prevented them "from growing beyond a certain segment of the electorate ... like we've seen in other countries where mainstream parties have not tightened immigration regulation to the same extent". Valur Ingimundarson of the University of Iceland wrote that the Social Democrats had "revised their immigration policy in such a radical way that it echoes many of the core tenets of the right-wing Danish People's Party", and "embraced the anti-immigration and anti-refugee stance of the populist right". Josef Joffe described the party's new stance as a combination of a "harsh anti-immigrant—but generous social—policy", and argued that by adopting such platform, the Social Democrats had "put on rightish clothes". Foreign Policy argued that the party "adopted the far-right's anti-immigration stance", citing their rejection of the United Nations annual quota of refugees resettled, support prison sentences for immigrant parents who take their children on extended visits to their home country, closing asylum centers, advocating detaining asylum seekers offshore and establishing facilities in North African countries instead.

Since then, the party is described as a "left conservative" social democratic party that "places itself to the left on issues related to welfare and redistribution, and right on cultural and value‐related issues". Its ideology was also described as a combination of "populism, socialism and cultural conservatism", and Social Democrats are compared to the Sahra Wagenknecht Alliance, a German "left-conservative" party that split from Die Linke. The party was also described as welfare chauvinist, as well as nativist. The party is thus seen to have taken a "nationalist and anti-immigrant turn", and increasingly came to be "perceived as a right-wing party". Frederiksen argued that her party had previously "underestimated the challenge of mass migration" and that the "economic policy and foreign policy in Europe have been too liberal."

== Political leadership ==
The party leader since 2015 is Mette Frederiksen. She succeeded Helle Thorning-Schmidt, who stepped down after the left bloc's defeat in the 2015 Danish general election. Deputy Party Leaders are Lennart Damsbo-Andersen and Christian Rabjerg Madsen. The Secretary General is Annette Lind.

=== Prime ministers ===
- Thorvald Stauning (1924–1926, 1929–1942)
- Vilhelm Buhl (1942, 1945)
- Hans Hedtoft (1947–1950, 1953–1955)
- Hans Christian Hansen (1955–1960)
- Viggo Kampmann (1960–1962)
- Jens Otto Krag (1962–1968, 1971–1972)
- Anker Jørgensen (1972–1973, 1975–1982)
- Poul Nyrup Rasmussen (1993–2001)
- Helle Thorning-Schmidt (2011–2015)
- Mette Frederiksen (2019–incumbent)

=== Leaders of the Social Democrats ===
No.	Portrait	Leader	Took office	Left office	Time in office
1	Louis Pio	Louis Pio (1841–1894)	1871	1872	0–1 years
2	Carl Würtz	Carl Würtz (1832–ca. 1873)	1872	1873	0–1 years
3	Ernst Wilhelm Klein	Ernst Wilhelm Klein (1830–ca. 1879)	1873	1872	1–2 years
(1)	Louis Pio	Louis Pio (1841–1894)	1875	1877	1–2 years
4	Christen Hørdum	Christen Hørdum (1846–1911)	1877	1878	0–1 years
5	A.C. Meyer	A.C. Meyer (1858–1938)	1878	1878	0 years
6	Saxo W. Wiegell	Saxo W. Wiegell (1843–1909)	1878	1880	1–2 years
(4)	Christen Hørdum	Christen Hørdum (1846–1911)	1880	1882	1–2 years
7	Peter Christian Knudsen	Peter Christian Knudsen (1848–1910)	1882	1910	27–28 years
8	Thorvald Stauning	Thorvald Stauning (1873–1942)	1910	1939	28–29 years
9	Hans Hedtoft	Hans Hedtoft (1903–1955)	1939	1955	15–16 years
10	H. C. Hansen	H. C. Hansen (1906–1960)	1955	1960	4–5 years
11	Viggo Kampmann	Viggo Kampmann (1910–1976)	1960	1962	1–2 years
12	Jens Otto Krag	Jens Otto Krag (1914–1978)	1962	1972	9–10 years
13	Anker Jørgensen	Anker Jørgensen (1922–2016)	1972	1987	14–15 years
14	Svend Auken	Svend Auken (1943–2009)	1987	3 September 1992	4–5 years
15	Poul Nyrup Rasmussen	Poul Nyrup Rasmussen (born 1943)	3 September 1992	14 December 2002	10 years
16	Mogens Lykketoft	Mogens Lykketoft (born 1946)	14 December 2002	12 April 2005	2 years
17	Helle Thorning-Schmidt	Helle Thorning-Schmidt (born 1966)	12 April 2005	28 June 2015	10 years
18	Mette Frederiksen	Mette Frederiksen (born 1977)	28 June 2015		11 years

== Election results ==
The Social Democrats governed Denmark for most of the 20th century, with a few intermissions such as the Conservative People's Party-led government of Poul Schlüter in the 1980s. It continued to be Denmark's largest party until 2001 when Anders Fogh Rasmussen's liberal Venstre party gained a landslide victory, becoming the largest party and forming a centre-right government. From 2015 and onwards, The Social Democrats have again been the largest party in Denmark. The Social Democrats returned to government from 2011 to 2015 and since 2019.

=== Parliament ===
Folketing
Year	Leader	Votes	%	± pp	Seats	+/–	Rank	Result
1884	P. Knudsen	7,000	4.9	New	2 / 102	New	3rd	Opposition
1887	P. Knudsen	8,000	3.5	▼1.4	1 / 102	▼1	3rd	Opposition
1890	P. Knudsen	17,000	7.3	▲3.8	3 / 102	▲2	3rd	Opposition
1892	P. Knudsen	20,000	8.9	▲1.6	2 / 102	▼1	▼4th	Opposition
1895	P. Knudsen	24,510	11.3	▲2.4	8 / 114	▲6	4th	Opposition
1898	P. Knudsen	31,870	14.2	▲2.9	12 / 114	▲4	4th	Opposition
1901	P. Knudsen	38,398	17.8	▲3.6	14 / 114	▲2	▲3rd	Opposition
1903	P. Knudsen	48,117	21.0	▲3.2	16 / 114	▲2	3rd	Opposition
1906	P. Knudsen	76,612	25.4	▲4.4	24 / 114	▲8	▲2nd	Opposition
1909	P. Knudsen	93,079	29.0	▲3.6	24 / 114	0	▲1st	External support
1910	Thorvald Stauning	98,718	28.3	▼0.7	24 / 114	0	▼2nd	Opposition
1913	Thorvald Stauning	107,365	29.6	▲1.3	32 / 114	▲8	▲1st	External support
1915	Thorvald Stauning	1,134	8.8	▼20.8	32 / 114	0	▼3rd	External support
1918	Thorvald Stauning	262,796	28.7	▲19.9	39 / 140	▲7	▲2nd	External support
1920 (April)	Thorvald Stauning	300,345	29.2	▲0.5	42 / 140	▲3	2nd	Caretaker government
1920 (July)	Thorvald Stauning	285,166	29.8	▲0.6	42 / 140	0	2nd	Opposition
1920 (September)	Thorvald Stauning	389,653	32.2	▲2.4	48 / 149	▲6	2nd	Opposition
1924	Thorvald Stauning	469,949	36.6	▲4.4	55 / 149	▲7	▲1st	Minority
1926	Thorvald Stauning	497,106	37.2	▲0.6	53 / 149	▼2	1st	Opposition
1929	Thorvald Stauning	593,191	41.8	▲4.6	61 / 149	▲8	1st	Coalition
1932	Thorvald Stauning	660.839	42.7	▲0.9	62 / 149	▲1	1st	Coalition
1935	Thorvald Stauning	759,102	46.4	▲3.7	68 / 149	▲6	1st	Coalition
1939	Thorvald Stauning	729,619	42.9	▼3.5	64 / 149	▼4	1st	Coalition
1943	Alsing Andersen	894,632	44.5	▲1.6	66 / 149	▲2	1st	Coalition
1945	Hans Hedtoft	671,755	32.8	▼11.7	48 / 149	▼18	1st	Opposition
1947	Hans Hedtoft	836,231	41.2	▲8.4	57 / 150	▲9	1st	Minority
1950	Hans Hedtoft	813,224	39.6	▼1.6	59 / 151	▲2	1st	Opposition
1953 (April)	Hans Hedtoft	836,507	40.4	▲0.8	61 / 151	▲2	1st	Opposition
1953 (September)	Hans Hedtoft	894,913	41.3	▲0.9	74 / 179	▲13	1st	Minority
1957	H.C. Hansen	910,170	39.4	▲1.9	70 / 179	▼4	1st	Coalition
1960	Viggo Kampmann	1,023,794	42.1	▲2.7	76 / 179	▲6	1st	Coalition
1964	Jens Otto Krag	1,103,667	41.9	▼0.2	76 / 179	0	1st	Minority
1966	Jens Otto Krag	1,068,911	38.2	▼3.7	69 / 179	▼7	1st	Minority
1968	Jens Otto Krag	974,833	34.2	▼4.0	62 / 179	▼7	1st	Opposition
1971	Jens Otto Krag	1,074,777	37.3	▲3.1	70 / 179	▲8	1st	Minority
1973	Anker Jørgensen	783,145	25.6	▼11.4	46 / 179	▼24	1st	Opposition
1975	Anker Jørgensen	913,155	29.9	▲4.0	53 / 179	▲7	1st	Minority
1977	Anker Jørgensen	1,150,355	37.0	▲7.1	65 / 179	▲12	1st	Minority (1977–1978)
1977	Anker Jørgensen	1,150,355	37.0	▲7.1	65 / 179	▲12	1st	Coalition (1978–1979)
1979	Anker Jørgensen	1,213,456	38.3	▲1.3	68 / 179	▲3	1st	Minority
1981	Anker Jørgensen	1,026,726	32.9	▼5.4	59 / 179	▼9	1st	Minority (1981–1982)
1981	Anker Jørgensen	1,026,726	32.9	▼5.4	59 / 179	▼9	1st	Opposition (1982–1984)
1984	Anker Jørgensen	1,062,561	31.6	▼1.3	56 / 179	▼3	1st	Opposition
1987	Anker Jørgensen	985,906	29.3	▼2.3	54 / 179	▼2	1st	Opposition
1988	Svend Auken	992,682	29.8	▼0.5	55 / 179	▲1	1st	Opposition
1990	Svend Auken	1,221,121	37.4	▲7.6	69 / 179	▲14	1st	Opposition (1990–1993)
1990	Svend Auken	1,221,121	37.4	▲7.6	69 / 179	▲14	1st	Coalition (1993–1994)
1994	Poul Nyrup Rasmussen	1,150,048	34.6	▼2.8	62 / 179	▼7	1st	Coalition
1998	Poul Nyrup Rasmussen	1,223,620	35.9	▲1.3	63 / 179	▲1	1st	Coalition
2001	Poul Nyrup Rasmussen	1,003,023	29.1	▼6.8	52 / 179	▼11	▼2nd	Opposition
2005	Mogens Lykketoft	867,350	25.8	▼3.3	47 / 179	▼5	2nd	Opposition
2007	Helle Thorning-Schmidt	881,037	25.5	▼0.3	45 / 179	▼2	2nd	Opposition
2011	Helle Thorning-Schmidt	879,615	24.8	▼0.7	44 / 179	▼1	2nd	Coalition
2015	Helle Thorning-Schmidt	925,288	26.3	▲1.5	47 / 179	▲3	▲1st	Opposition
2019	Mette Frederiksen	915,363	25.9	▼0.4	48 / 179	▲1	1st	Minority
2022	Mette Frederiksen	971,995	27.5	▲1.6	50 / 179	▲2	1st	Coalition
2026	Mette Frederiksen	779,252	21.8	▼5.7	38 / 179	▼12	1st	Coalition

=== Local elections ===
Municipal elections

Year	Seats	
Year	No.	±
1925	1,840 / 11,289	
1929	1,957 / 11,329	▲117
1933	2,218 / 11,424	▲261
1937	2,496 / 11,425	▲278
1943	2,713 / 10,569	▲217
1946	2,975 / 11,488	▲262
1950	2,960 / 11,499	▼15
1954	3,139 / 11,505	▲179
1958	3,023 / 11,529	▼116
1962	2,196 / 11,414	▼827
1966	2,638 / 10,005	▲442
Municipal reform
1970	1,769 / 4,677	▼769
1974	1,532 / 4,735	▼237
1978	1,704 / 4,759	▲172
1981	1,601 / 4,769	▼103
1985	1,722 / 4,773	▲121
1989	1,753 / 4,737	▲31
1993	1,700 / 4,703	▼53
1997	1,648 / 4,685	▼52
2001	1,551 / 4,647	▼97
Municipal reform
2005	900 / 2,522	▼651
2009	801 / 2,468	▼99
2013	773 / 2,444	▼28
2017	842 / 2,432	▲69
2021	756 / 2,436	▼86

Regional elections

Year	Seats	
Year	No.	±
1935	85 / 299	
1943	92 / 299	▲7
1946	94 / 299	▲2
1950	89 / 299	▼5
1954	97 / 299	▲8
1958	96 / 303	▼1
1962	100 / 301	▲4
1966	99 / 303	▼1
Municipal reform
1970	162 / 366	▲63
1974	135 / 370	▼27
1978	144 / 370	▲9
1981	140 / 370	▼4
1985	143 / 374	▲3
1989	146 / 374	▲3
1993	136 / 374	▼10
1997	136 / 374	0
2001	129 / 374	▼7
Municipal reform
2005	77 / 205	▼52
2009	68 / 205	▼9
2013	67 / 205	▼1
2017	70 / 205	▲3
2021	64 / 205	▼6

Mayors

Year	Seats	
Year	No.	±
2005	45 / 98	
2009	49 / 98	▲4
2013	33 / 98	▼16
2017	47 / 98	▲14
2021	43 / 98	▼4

=== European Parliament elections ===
European Parliament
Year	List leader	Votes	%	Seats	+/–	EP Group
1979	Kjeld Olesen	382,487	21.92 (#1)	3 / 16	New	SOC
1984	Eva Gredal	387,098	19.45 (#3)	3 / 16	0	SOC
1989	Kirsten Jensen	417,076	23.31 (#1)	4 / 16	▲1	SOC
1994	Kirsten Jensen	329,202	15.83 (#3)	3 / 16	▼1	PES
1999	Torben Lund	324,256	16.46 (#2)	3 / 16	0	PES
2004	Poul Nyrup Rasmussen	618,412	32.65 (#1)	5 / 14	▲2	PES
2009	Dan Jørgensen	503,982	21.49 (#1)	4 / 13	▼1	S&D
2014	Jeppe Kofod	435,245	19.12 (#2)	3 / 13	▼1	S&D
2019	Jeppe Kofod	592,645	21.48 (#2)	3 / 14	0	S&D
2024	Christel Schaldemose	381,125	15.57 (#2)	3 / 14	0	S&D

== Representation ==
=== Folketing ===
At the 2019 election the Social Democrats won 48 seats in parliament. Henrik Sass Larsen was originally elected, but resigned his seat on 30 September 2019, after which Tanja Larsson took over his seat. Ida Auken was originally elected as a member of the Socialist People's Party, but switched to the Social Democrats on 29 January 2021.

- Ida Auken
- Trine Bramsen
- Bjørn Brandenborg
- Jeppe Bruus
- Morten Bødskov
- Lennart Damsbo-Andersen
- Kaare Dybvad
- Benny Engelbrecht
- Camilla Fabricius
- Mette Frederiksen
- Ane Halsboe-Jørgensen
- Orla Hav
- Mette Gjerskov
- Magnus Heunicke
- Peter Hummelgaard
- Nick Hækkerup
- Daniel Toft Jakobsen
- Leif Lahn Jensen
- Mogens Jensen
- Thomas Jensen
- Jens Joel
- Jan Johansen
- Dan Jørgensen
- Kasper Sand Kjær
- Simon Kollerup
- Astrid Krag
- Henrik Dam Kristensen
- Anders Kronborg
- Rasmus Horn Langhoff
- Malte Larsen
- Tanja Larsson
- Bjarne Laustsen
- Annette Lind
- Christian Rabjerg Madsen
- Flemming Møller Mortensen
- Henrik Møller
- Anne Paulin
- Jesper Petersen
- Rasmus Prehn
- Lars Aslan Rasmussen
- Troels Ravn
- Pernille Rosenkrantz-Theil
- Kasper Roug
- Julie Skovsby
- Rasmus Stoklund
- Mattias Tesfaye
- Birgitte Vind
- Nicolai Wammen
- Lea Wermelin

=== European Parliament ===
At the 2019 European Parliament election, the Social Democrats won three seats. The Social Democrats are part of the Progressive Alliance of Socialists and Democrats in the European Parliament.

- Niels Fuglsang
- Christel Schaldemose
- Marianne Vind

=== Nordic Council ===
Of the 16 Danish members of the Nordic Council, four are members of the Social Democrats. The members of the Nordic Council are not elected by the public, but instead chosen by the parliamentary party groups. The Social Democrats are part of The Social Democratic Group in the Nordic Council.

- Orla Hav
- Anders Kronborg
- Henrik Møller
- Kasper Roug

== Youth wings ==
The Social Democratic Youth of Denmark (Danish: Danmarks Socialdemokratiske Ungdom) is the Social Democrats' youth wing. It was founded on 8 February 1920 and is an independent organization from the Social Democrats. This allows them to formulate their own policies and make their own campaigns. Prominent Social Democrats beginning their political work in the Social Democratic Youth include prime ministers Hans Hedtoft, H. C. Hansen, Jens Otto Krag, Anker Jørgensen and Mette Frederiksen, as well as ministers Per Hækkerup and Morten Bødskov. Frit Forum is the Social Democrats' student organization. It was founded in 1943 in Copenhagen. It has since 1973 been organizationally part of Social Democratic Youth. Prominent members previously leading Frit Forum include prime minister Poul Nyrup Rasmussen and other leaders of the Social Democrats Mogens Lykketoft and Svend Auken.

== See also ==
- List of political parties in Denmark
- Politics of Denmark
