= Venstre (Denmark) =

Danish political party

Venstre, Denmark's Liberal Party Venstre, Danmarks Liberale Parti
- Abbreviation: V
- Leader: Troels Lund Poulsen
- Deputy Leader: Stephanie Lose
- Founded: 30 June 1870 (original form); 1910 (current form)
- Headquarters: Søllerødvej 30, 2840 Holte
- Youth wing: Venstres Ungdom
- Student wing: Liberal Students of Denmark
- Membership (2021): ▼28,007
- Ideology: Conservative liberalism; Agrarianism (Nordic)
- Political position: Centre-right
- European affiliation: Alliance of Liberals and Democrats for Europe
- European Parliament group: Renew Europe
- International affiliation: Liberal International
- Nordic affiliation: Centre Group
- Colours: Navy blue
- Slogan: Frihed og fællesskab ('Freedom and Community')
- Folketing: 18 / 179 (10%) (Note: Only 175 of the 179 seats in the Danish Parliament, the Folketing, are obtainable by Danish political parties as Greenland and the Faroe Islands are assigned two seats each due to their status as territories in the Kingdom of Denmark.)
- European Parliament: 2 / 15 (13%)
- Regions: 28 / 205
- Municipalities: 521 / 2,436
- Mayors: 42 / 98

Election symbol
- V

Party flag

Website
- venstre.dk

Venstre (Note: The party name is officially not translated into any other language, but is in English often referred to as the Liberal Party. Similar rules apply for the name of the party's youth wing Venstres Ungdom.) (Danish: [ˈvenstʁɐ], lit. 'Left', V), full name Venstre, Danmarks Liberale Parti (English: Left, Denmark's Liberal Party), is a conservative-liberal, agrarian political party in Denmark. Founded as part of a peasants' movement against the landed aristocracy, today it espouses an economically liberal, pro-free-market ideology.

Venstre is the major party of the centre-right in Denmark, and the third-largest party in the country. The party has produced many Prime Ministers. In the 2022 general elections, Venstre received 13.3% of the vote and 23 out of 179 seats. Following the resignation of Jakob Ellemann-Jensen, the party is led by Troels Lund Poulsen who serves as the country's Deputy Prime Minister. From 2022 to 2026, the party was a junior partner in the second Frederiksen government.

The party is a member of Liberal International and the Alliance of Liberals and Democrats for Europe Party (ALDE Party) and has two MEPs in the European Parliament.

== History ==
Venstre 1945 election material ("Venstre has been dealt a good hand").

=== 1870–1910 ===
Venstre was founded in 1870 under the name "Det Forenede Venstre" (lit. 'The United Left'). Originally, the party consisted of multiple conflicting groups, all united under liberalism, the safeguarding of farmers' interests and opposition to the then right-wing classical conservative party Højre (literally "Right"). After the party in 1872 gained an absolute majority in the Folketing, it became the leading voice in the battle for parliamentarism, whereafter the party in 1895 split in two, Venstrereformpartiet ("Venstre Reform Party") and Det Moderate Venstre ("The Moderate Left"). In 1905, social liberal factions split from the party and formed Radikale Venstre (also known as the Danish Social Liberal Party), and in 1910 Venstrereformpartiet and Det Moderate Venstre reunited again under the name Venstre. During the late Nineteenth Century, Venstre and the Social Democrats collaborated on social legislation; with several measures passed during this period that both parties supported, including old age pensions in 1891 and health insurance a year later.

=== 1910–2009 ===
With the decreasing numbers of farms and the growing urbanisation, membership and voter support dropped in the 1950s. During the 1960s the party gradually evolved from being a traditional farmers' party to a more general liberal party. In 1984 Uffe Ellemann-Jensen was elected chairman, and by profiling the liberal ideology in sharp confrontation to the Social Democrats, for example by campaigning for a reduction of the public sector, increasing market management and privatisation, and by being pro-EU, the party returned to its historical position as the biggest liberal party in the 1990s.

After a disappointing 1998 general election, Ellemann-Jensen resigned as chairman and Anders Fogh Rasmussen was elected in his place. He immediately changed the party's usual confrontational strategy, instead appealing to the political centre. In the 2001 general elections the party campaigned for tighter immigration policies and a "tax stop", which proved successful and the party once again became the biggest in parliament, winning 31.2% of the vote and 56 seats. Venstre formed a coalition government with the Conservative People's Party and the Danish People's Party. For the first time since 1929 a liberal government was no longer dependent on the centre parties. Despite a small decline in both the 2005 general elections (29% and 52 seats) and the 2007 general elections (26.2% and 46 seats), the party remained the biggest and the coalition government continued.

On 5 April 2009, Fogh Rasmussen resigned as chairman, instead serving as Secretary General of NATO. In his place Lars Løkke Rasmussen was elected.

=== 2009–present ===
In the 2011 general elections, the party gained 26.7% of the vote and 47 seats, but was not able to form a government, instead leading the opposition against Prime Minister Helle Thorning-Schmidt's Social Democratic coalition.

Even though the party lost voter support in the 2015 general elections, only gaining 19.5% of the vote, the party formed a minority government. This government was short-lived, and in 2016 Løkke Rasmussen invited the Conservative People's Party and the Liberal Alliance to form a coalition government instead.

During the campaign of the 2019 general elections, Løkke Rasmussen published an autobiography, in which he opened up for the possibility of forming a government with the Social Democrats. This was seen as controversial in the liberal "blue bloc", and Social Democratic leader Mette Frederiksen immediately declined the proposition.

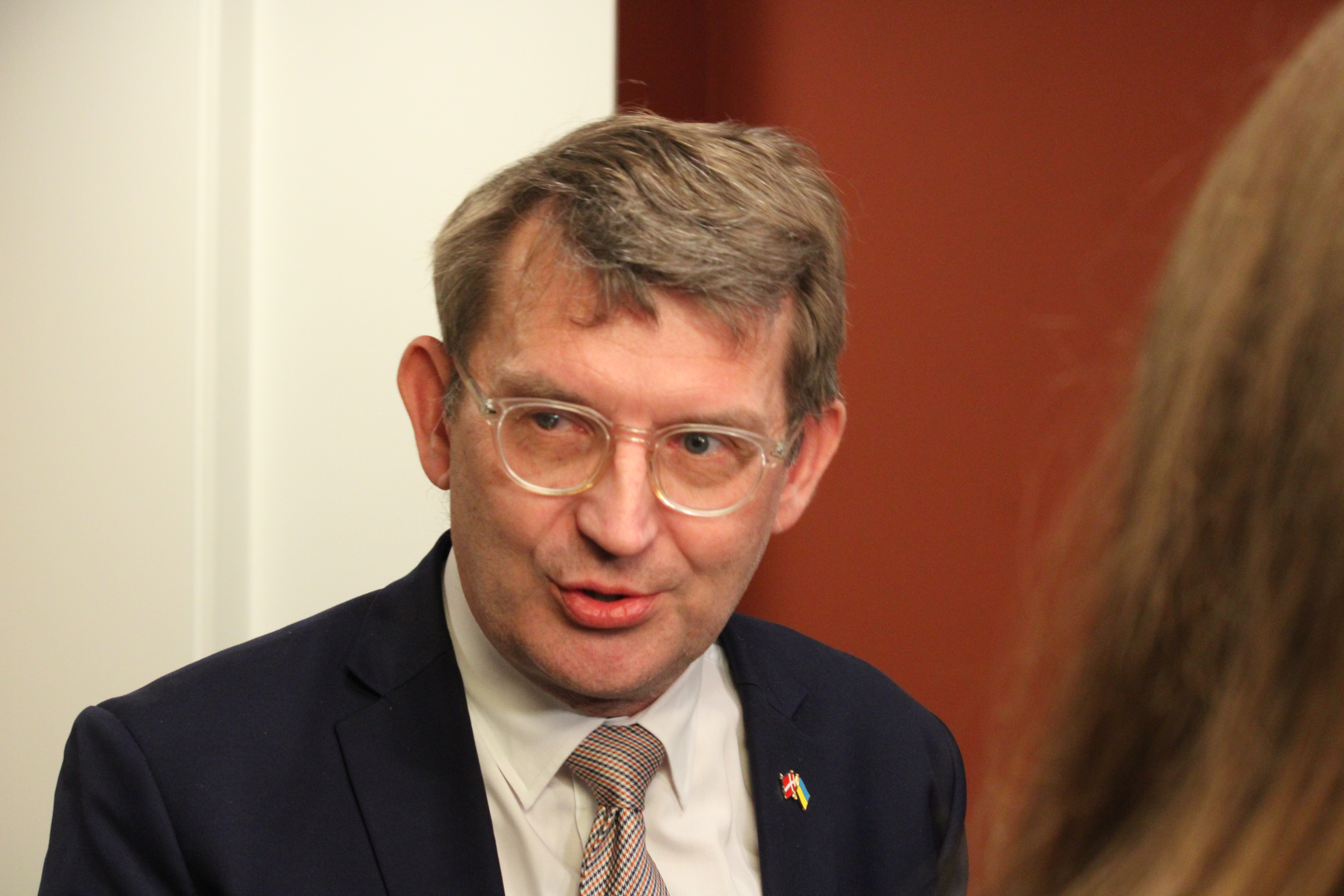
Troels Lund Poulsen, chairman 2023-

Following internal fighting in the party, Løkke Rasmussen and vice chairman Kristian Jensen both resigned on 31 August 2019. On 21 September 2019, political spokesman and former Minister for Environment and Food Jakob Ellemann-Jensen was elected the party's next chairman.

Following the 2022 general election, in which Venstre suffered its worst result since 1988, Venstre joined a grand coalition government led by Social Democrat leader Mette Frederiksen, and also comprising the Moderates, a Venstre splinter formed by former Prime Minister Lars Løkke Rasmussen.

== Ideology ==
Venstre is categorised as centre-right on the political spectrum, although it has been also described as centrist and right-wing. Ideologically, it has been described as conservative-liberal, liberal-conservative, liberal, conservative, classical-liberal, and agrarian. Additionally, Venstre takes a nativist stance regarding immigration and asylum-seeking; they had also said that "immigrants should learn Danish and understand and respect Danish culture and traditions".

Venstre is an economically liberal party within the Nordic agrarian tradition, and today is notably more pro–free market than its sister parties. Since the elections in 2001, Venstre has enacted a so-called "tax stop" in order to halt the growth in taxes seen during the previous eight years under the Social Democrats. This tax stop has been criticised by parties on the left of Danish politics who described it as "asocial" and "only for the rich."

== Organization ==
=== Name and terms ===
The fact that the major centre-right political party in a country calls itself 'Left' is often confusing to foreign (and sometimes Danish) observers. The name has, however, its historical explanation. At the time of its foundation, Venstre affirmed then-progressive ideas in the Danish parliament. Their opponents, Højre (Right), the forerunner of the present-day Conservative People's Party, advocated for established interests, particularly the Church of Denmark and the landed gentry. In current Danish politics there is a clear distinction between the concepts of Venstre (Left, i.e., the party bearing that name) and venstrefløj (left wing, i.e., socialist and other left-leaning parties). The use of the word for "left" in the name of the Danish political party Radikale Venstre (literally: "Radical Left") and the Norwegian party Venstre is meant to refer to liberalism and not socialism.

Members of the party are referred to as venstremænd and venstrekvinder, respectively "Venstre men" and "Venstre women" (singular: -mand, -kvinde).

=== Leadership ===
No.	Portrait	Leader	Took office	Left office	Time in office
1	Thomas Madsen-Mygdal	Thomas Madsen-Mygdal (1876–1943)	1929	1941	11–12 years
2	Knud Kristensen	Knud Kristensen (1880–1962)	1941	1949	7–8 years
3	Edvard Sørensen	Edvard Sørensen (1893–1954)	1949	1950	0–1 years
4	Erik Eriksen	Erik Eriksen (1902–1972)	1950	24 May 1965	14–15 years
5	Poul Hartling	Poul Hartling (1914–2000)	24 May 1965	December 1977	12 years, 191 days
6	Henning Christophersen	Henning Christophersen (1939–2016)	September 1978	23 July 1984	5 years, 326 days
7	Uffe Ellemann-Jensen	Uffe Ellemann-Jensen (1941–2022)	23 July 1984	18 March 1998	13 years, 238 days
8	Anders Fogh Rasmussen	Anders Fogh Rasmussen (born 1953)	18 March 1998	17 May 2009	11 years, 60 days
9	Lars Løkke Rasmussen	Lars Løkke Rasmussen (born 1964)	17 May 2009	31 August 2019	10 years, 106 days
–	Kristian Jensen	Kristian Jensen (born 1971); Acting	31 August 2019	21 September 2019	21 days
10	Jakob Ellemann-Jensen	Jakob Ellemann-Jensen (born 1973)	21 September 2019	23 October 2023	4 years, 32 days
–	Stephanie Lose	Stephanie Lose (born 1982); Acting	23 October 2023	18 November 2023	26 days
11	Troels Lund Poulsen	Troels Lund Poulsen (born 1976)	18 November 2023	Incumbent	3 years, 4 days

=== Prime ministers ===
- Johan Henrik Deuntzer (24 July 1901 – 14 January 1905)
- Jens Christian Christensen (14 January 1905 – 12 October 1908)
- Niels Neergaard (12 October 1908 – 16 August 1909)
- Ludvig Holstein-Ledreborg (16 August 1909 – 28 October 1909)
- Klaus Berntsen (5 July 1910 – 21 June 1913)
- Niels Neergaard (5 May 1920 – 23 April 1924)
- Thomas Madsen-Mygdal (14 December 1926 – 30 April 1929)
- Knud Kristensen (7 November 1945 – 13 November 1947)
- Erik Eriksen (30 October 1950 – 30 September 1953)
- Poul Hartling (19 December 1973 – 13 February 1975)
- Anders Fogh Rasmussen (27 November 2001 – 5 April 2009)
- Lars Løkke Rasmussen (5 April 2009 – 3 October 2011; 28 June 2015 – 27 June 2019)

=== Youth and student wings ===
- Venstres Ungdom
- Liberal Students of Denmark (Danmarks Liberale Studerende)

=== European affiliation and representation ===
In the European Parliament, Venstre sits in the Renew Europe group with four MEPs.

In the European Committee of the Regions, Venstre sits in the Renew Europe CoR group, with five full members for the 2025–2030 mandate.

== Election results ==
=== Parliament ===
Election	Votes	%	Seats	+/-	Government
1872			53 / 104	New	Opposition
1873			51 / 104	▼2	Opposition
1876			74 / 104	▲23	Opposition
1879			65 / 104	▼9	Opposition
1881 (May)			69 / 102	▲4	Opposition
1881 (Jul)			75 / 102	▲6	Opposition
1884	80,000	56.3 (#1)	81 / 102	▲6	Opposition
1887	132,000	58.1 (#1)	74 / 102	▼7	Opposition
1890	123,000	53.0 (#1)	75 / 102	▲1	Opposition
1892	63,000	28.1 (#3)	30 / 102	▼45	Opposition
1895	89,530	40.5 (#1)	53 / 114	▲23	Opposition
1898	98,070	43.6 (#1)	63 / 114	▲10	Opposition
1901	103,495	45.9 (#1)	76 / 114	▲13	Majority
1903	121,357	49.4 (#1)	73 / 114	▼3	Majority
1906	94,272	31.2 (#1)	56 / 114	▼17	Minority
1909	77,949	24.0 (#1)	37 / 114	▼19	Minority (1909)
1909	77,949	24.0 (#1)	37 / 114	▼19	Opposition (1909–1910)
1910	118,902	34.1 (#1)	57 / 114	▲20	Majority
1913	103,917	28.6 (#2)	44 / 114	▼13	Opposition
1915	8,081	62.8 (#1)	43 / 114	▼1	Opposition
1918	269,646	29.4 (#1)	45 / 140	▲2	Opposition
1920 (Apr)	350,563	34.2 (#1)	48 / 140	▲3	Caretaker government
1920 (Jul)	344,351	36.1 (#1)	51 / 140	▲3	Minority
1920 (Sep)	411,661	34.0 (#1)	51 / 149	0	Minority
1924	362,682	28.3 (#2)	44 / 149	▼7	Opposition
1926	378,137	28.3 (#2)	46 / 149	▲2	Minority
1929	402,121	28.3 (#2)	43 / 149	▼3	Opposition
1932	381,862	24.7 (#2)	38 / 149	▼5	Opposition
1935	292,247	17.8 (#2)	28 / 149	▼10	Opposition
1939	309,355	18.2 (#2)	30 / 149	▲2	Opposition (1939–1940)
1939	309,355	18.2 (#2)	30 / 149	▲2	Coalition (1940–1943)
1943	376,850	18.7 (#3)	28 / 149	▼2	Coalition
1945	479,158	23.4 (#2)	38 / 149	▲10	Minority
1947 (Note: Party stood as Capital Venstre in Nomination districts of the Copenhagen constituency)	529,066	27.6 (#2)	49 / 150	▲8	Opposition
1950	438,188	21.3 (#2)	32 / 151	▼14	Coalition
1953 (Apr)	456,896	22.1 (#2)	33 / 151	▲1	Coalition
1953 (Sep)	499,656	23.1 (#2)	42 / 179	▲9	Opposition
1957	578,932	25.1 (#2)	45 / 179	▲3	Opposition
1960	512,041	21.1 (#2)	38 / 179	▼7	Opposition
1964	547,770	20.8 (#2)	38 / 179	0	Opposition
1966	539,027	19.3 (#2)	35 / 179	▼3	Opposition
1968	530,167	18.6 (#3)	34 / 179	▼1	Coalition
1971	450,904	15.6 (#3)	30 / 179	▼4	Opposition
1973	374,283	12.3 (#3)	22 / 179	▼8	Minority
1975	711,298	23.3 (#2)	42 / 179	▲20	Opposition
1977	371,728	12.0 (#3)	21 / 179	▼21	Opposition (1977–1978)
1977	371,728	12.0 (#3)	21 / 179	▼21	Coalition (1978–1979)
1979	396,484	12.5 (#2)	22 / 179	▲1	Opposition
1981	353,280	11.3 (#4)	20 / 179	▼2	Opposition (1981–1982)
1981	353,280	11.3 (#4)	20 / 179	▼2	Coalition (1982–1984)
1984	405,737	12.1 (#3)	22 / 179	▲2	Coalition
1987	354,291	10.5 (#4)	19 / 179	▼3	Coalition
1988	394,190	11.8 (#4)	22 / 179	▲3	Coalition
1990	511,643	15.8 (#3)	29 / 179	▲7	Coalition (1990–1993)
1990	511,643	15.8 (#3)	29 / 179	▲7	Opposition (1993–1994)
1994	775,176	23.3 (#2)	42 / 179	▲13	Opposition
1998	817,894	24.0 (#2)	42 / 179	0	Opposition
2001	1,077,858	31.2 (#1)	56 / 179	▲14	Coalition
2005	974,636	29.0 (#1)	52 / 179	▼4	Coalition
2007	908,472	26.2 (#1)	46 / 179	▼6	Coalition
2011	947,725	26.7 (#1)	47 / 179	▲1	Opposition
2015	685,188	19.5 (#3)	34 / 179	▼13	Minority (2015–2016)
2015	685,188	19.5 (#3)	34 / 179	▼13	Coalition (2016–2019)
2019	825,486	23.4 (#2)	43 / 179	▲9	Opposition
2022	460,546	13.3 (#2)	23 / 179	▼20	Coalition
2026	361,689	10.1 (#3)	18 / 179	▼5	Opposition

=== Local elections ===
Municipal elections

Year	Seats	
Year	#	±
1925	2,291 / 11,289	
1929	2,615 / 11,329	▲324
1933	2,692 / 11,424	▲77
1937	2,374 / 11,425	▼318
1943	2,217 / 10,569	▼157
1946	2,519 / 11,488	▲302
1950	2,342 / 11,499	▼177
1954	2,353 / 11,505	▲11
1958	2,405 / 11,529	▲52
1962	2,196 / 11,414	▼209
1966	1,747 / 10,005	▼449
Municipal reform
1970	1,080 / 4,677	▼667
1974	1,277 / 4,735	▲197
1978	1,155 / 4,759	▼122
1981	1,240 / 4,769	▲85
1985	1,201 / 4,773	▼39
1989	1,261 / 4,737	▲60
1993	1,601 / 4,703	▲340
1997	1,557 / 4,685	▼44
2001	1,666 / 4,647	▲109
Municipal reform
2005	804 / 2,522	▼862
2009	699 / 2,468	▼105
2013	767 / 2,444	▲68
2017	688 / 2,432	▼79
2021	620 / 2,436	▼68
2025	522 / 2,436	▼98

Regional elections

Year	Seats		
Year	#	±	
1935	217,375	124 / 299	New
1943	300,241	123 / 299	▼1
1946	368,040	139 / 299	▲16
1950	348,861	128 / 299	▼11
1954	355,295	127 / 299	▼1
1958	412,111	135 / 303	▲8
1962	387,628	127 / 301	▼8
1966	402,574	115 / 303	▼12
Municipal reform
1970	449,479	95 / 366	▼20
1974	400,062	98 / 370	▲3
1978	411,812	90 / 370	▼8
1981	457,565	84 / 370	▼6
1985	418,149	83 / 374	▼1
1989	451,807	89 / 374	▲6
1993	717,536	125 / 374	▲36
1997	665,857	124 / 374	▼1
2001	963,220	139 / 374	▲15
Municipal reform
2005	744,466	60 / 205	▼79
2009	648,903	54 / 205	▼6
2013	809,664	62 / 205	▲8
2017	744,005	54 / 205	▼8
2021	689,869	54 / 205	0
Municipal reform
2025	540,684	28 / 134	▼26

Mayors

Year	Seats	
Year	No.	±
2005	35 / 98	
2009	31 / 98	▼4
2013	48 / 98	▲17
2017	37 / 98	▼11
2021	35 / 98	▼2
2025	42 / 98	▲7

=== European Parliament ===
Year	List leader	Votes	%	Seats	+/–	EP Group
1979	Tove Nielsen	252,767	14.48 (#3)	3 / 16	New	LD
1984	Tove Nielsen	248,397	12.48 (#4)	2 / 16	▼1	LDR
1989	Niels Anker Kofoed	297,565	16.63 (#3)	3 / 16	▲1	LDR
1994	Eva Kjer Hansen	394,362	18.96 (#1)	4 / 16	▲1	ELDR
1999	Bertel Haarder	460,834	23.39 (#1)	5 / 16	▲1	ELDR
2004	Karin Riis-Jørgensen	366,734	19.36 (#2)	3 / 14	▼2	ALDE
2009	Jens Rohde	474,041	20.24 (#2)	3 / 13	0	ALDE
2014	Ulla Tørnæs	379,840	16.68 (#3)	2 / 13	▼1	ALDE
2019	Morten Løkkegaard	648,203	23.50 (#1)	4 / 14	▲2	RE
2024	Morten Løkkegaard	360,212	14.72 (#3)	2 / 14	▼2	RE

== See also ==
- Liberalism
- Contributions to liberal theory
- Liberalism worldwide
- List of liberal parties
- Liberal democracy
- Liberalism and radicalism in Denmark
- Nordic agrarian parties
