= Moderate Venstre (Denmark) =

Moderate Left Moderate Venstre
- Abbreviation: F
- Split from: Venstre

Moderate Venstre, also known as the Moderate Liberals or Moderate Left, was a political party in Denmark.

== History ==
The party emerged as the largest faction in the 1892 Folketing elections, winning 39 of the 102 seats. The 1895 elections saw it defeated by the Venstre Reform Party, finishing in second place with 27 seats. In 1898 the party was reduced to 23 seats, before falling to 16 seats in 1901, twelve seats in 1903 and nine seats in 1906.

After the party recovered to win eleven seats in 1909, it merged into Venstre before the 1910 elections.

== Election results ==
=== Folketing ===
Election	Votes	%	+/–	Seats	+/–	Size	Status
1892		28.1	New	39 / 102	New	1st	Support
1895	42,635			27 / 144	▼12	▼2nd	Support
1898	36,395			23 / 114	▼4	2nd	Support
1901	26,993	11.99		16 / 114	▼7	2nd	Opposition
1903	19,149	8.12	▼3.87	12 / 114	▼4	▼3rd	Opposition
1906	20,487	6.78	▼1.34	9 / 114	▼3	▼4th	Opposition
1909	19,241	5.93	▼0.85	11 / 114	▲2	▼5th	Opposition
