= Peter Christian Knudsen =

Danish politician

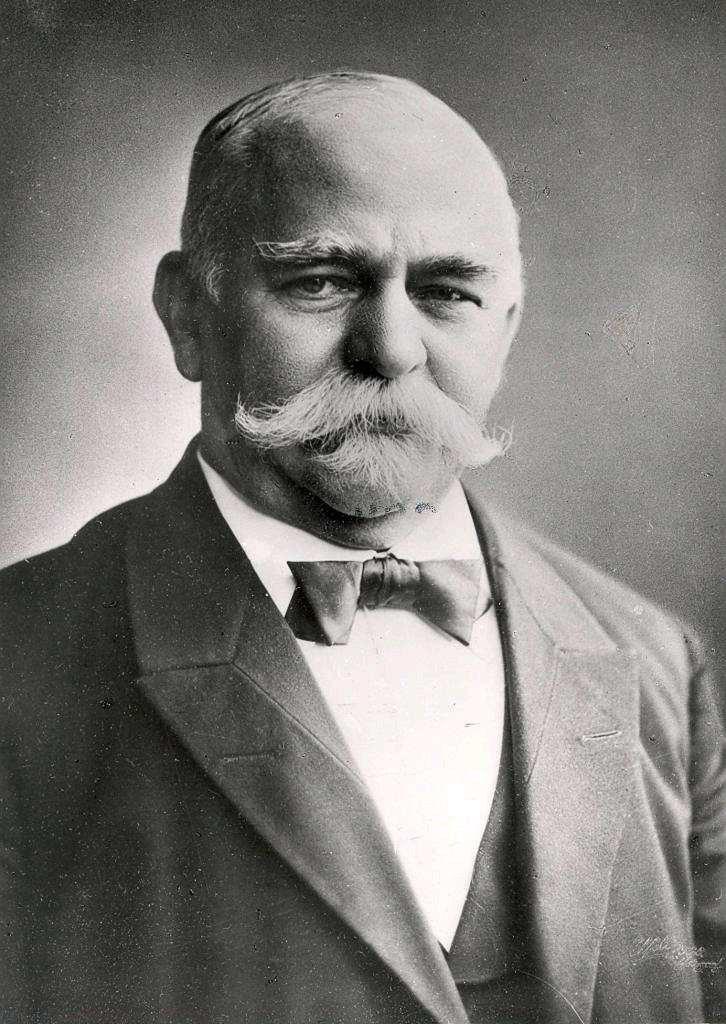
Peter Christian Knudsen.

Peter Christian Knudsen (in Danish known as P. Knudsen) (1848, Randers – 1910, Copenhagen) was the leader of the Danish Social Democratic party from 1882 to 1910 resigning a few months before his death. Knudsen served on the Copenhagen City Council from 1897 to 1902. He was a member of the Danish parliament (Folketinget) in 1898–1901 and 1902–1909.

Party political offices
| Preceded by Chresten Hørdum | Leader of the Danish Social Democrats; 1882 – 1910 | Succeeded by Thorvald Stauning |
