= Højre =

Name of two Danish political parties of Conservative persuasion

Højre (Danish: [ˈhʌjʁɐ], Right) was the name of two Danish political parties of Conservative persuasion.

The first Højre party existed from 1848 to 1866.

The second Højre party, centred on Prime Minister J.B.S. Estrup, was founded in 1881. The party was succeeded by the Conservative People's Party, founded in 1916.
