= Danish Unitary State =

Danish state, 1819–1903

Danish Monarchy Helstaten (Danish) Dänischer Gesamtstaat (German)
- 1814–1864
- Top: Royal Standard of Denmark (1819–1903); Bottom: Flag of Denmark Coat of arms

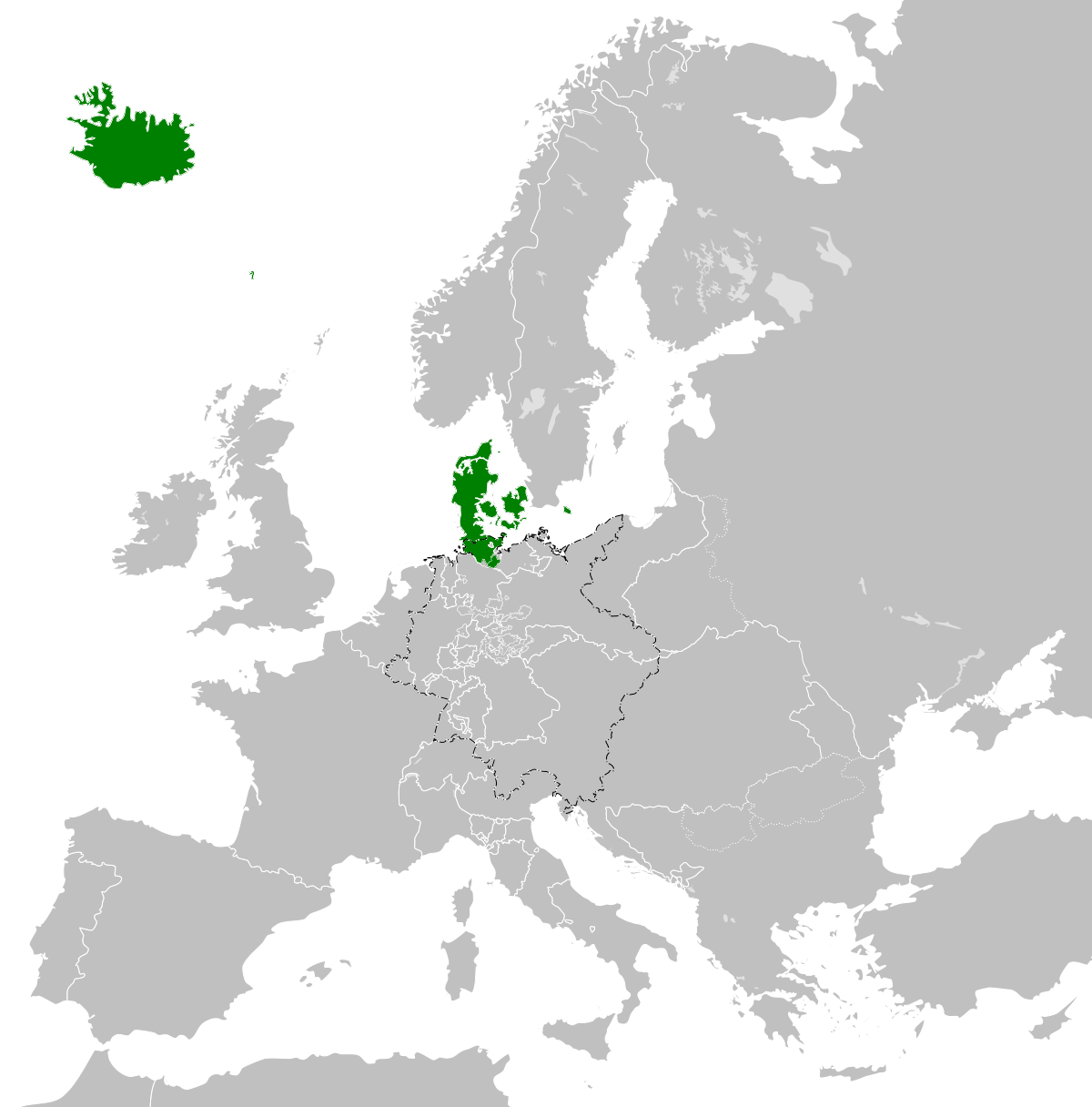
- Territories that were part of the Kingdom of Denmark from 1814 to 1864
- Status: Real union between Schleswig, Holstein, Lauenburg and Denmark
- Common languages: Danish, German, Frisian
- Religion: Lutheranism
- Government: Absolute monarchy (until 1848); Constitutional monarchy (from 1849)
- King of Denmark, Duke of Schleswig, Holstein and Lauenburg
  - 1808–1839: Frederik VI
  - 1839–1848: Christian VIII
  - 1848–1863: Frederik VII
  - 1863-1906: Christian IX
- Prime ministers (1848–1855) Council Presidents (1855–1864)
  - 1848–1852: Adam Wilhelm Moltke
  - 1852–1853: Christian Albrecht Bluhme
  - 1853–1854: Anders Sandøe Ørsted
  - 1854–1856: Peter Georg Bang
  - 1856–1857: Carl Christoffer Georg Andræ
  - 1857–1859: Carl Christian Hall
  - 1859–1860: Carl Edvard Rotwitt
  - 1863–1864: Ditlev Gothard Monrad
- Historical era: Late Modern Period
  - Treaty of Kiel: 14 January 1814
  - Congress of Vienna: 1815
  - First Schleswig War: 1848–1851
  - Constitution of 1849: 5 June 1849
  - Second Schleswig War: 1864
  - Treaty of Vienna: 30 October 1864
Preceded by
Denmark-Norway
Succeeded by
Denmark
Prussia
Austrian Empire
- Today part of: Denmark; Iceland; Germany; United States

The Danish Unitary State (Danish: Helstaten; German: Gesammtstaat), officially the Danish Monarchy after 1855, was a Danish political designation for the personal union, and later real union formation, of Denmark, Schleswig, Holstein, and Saxe-Lauenburg, between the two treaties of Vienna in 1815 and 1864. The usage of the term became relevant after the First Schleswig War, when a need for a constitutional framework for the monarchy was present, which ought to follow the premises of the London Protocol, which prohibited a closer connection between two of the monarchy's possessions. The political designation was ultimately eliminated after The Second Schleswig War and was replaced by the national state in 1866.

== Definitions and meaning ==
The Danish term Helstaten refers to two historical state formations of Denmark. One being the twin realms of Denmark–Norway, and the other (and most referred to) is the personal and for a short time real union between Denmark and the North German duchies of Schleswig, Holstein, and Lauenburg. (From 1815)

=== Definition ===
There are various of different definitions of the word Helstat. Helstat is a compound word, combined from Hel (English: Whole) and stat (English: State), compound to 'Whole-state'. According to Salmonsens, a Helstat is:

A state connection under a common monarchy has existed between parts of the state that could neither be described as a Federal State nor as mere provinces, so that the unit could neither be said to constitute a mere real union, a confederation in the narrower sense nor an equivalent. Unity State

— Salmonsens Konversationsleksikon

It is also noted that the term is mainly used in connection with Denmark and the Duchies and the Austrian Realm's Constitution Another definition by the Danish Lexicon of Ordbog over det danske sprog States as follows:

State, consisting of several parts of the state connected under a common constitution for the common affairs (cf. unitary, federal state); spec. about the state connection that was sought to be maintained between 1850 and 1864 between the Danish Kingdom, Southern Jutland and the German Duchies

— Ordbog over det danske sprog

Similar definitions are giving by Illustreret dansk konversationslektion and Norsk Riksmålsordbok.

Despite small disagreements, the definitions agree on certain points.

1. A Helstat is a state formation consisting of more than one political entity
2. They share some political aspects (for example foreign affairs)
3. Yet the political entities have an extensive autonomy

It should also be noted that the Salmonsens Konversationsleksikon, Illustreret dansk konversationslektion, and Ordbog over det dansk sprog, specifically mentions the state formation of Denmark and the Duchies, as such examples of a Helstat.

=== Historic usage in reference to Denmark and Norway ===
The first mention of the word Helstat in a historical context, is from 1885, in the book Danmark-Norges indre Historie 1660- 1720, by Edward Holm referring to the union between the two nations of Denmark and Norway, as a direct whole state. Other Danish works mentioning the word in reference to Denmark-Norway include; Danmark-Norge i det 18. Aarhundrede, by Albert Olsen, Dansk-Norsk Veksel virkning i det 18. Aarhundred, by Hans Jensen and Mellem brødre, by Vilhelm la Cour.

Olsen, like Holm, describes the Helstat as an opposition to the expression of special interests, yet Olsen does not argue why he chose to call Denmark-Norway a Helstat. Moreover, Olsen sees the Helstat as the complete opposite of the Nationalstaten and thereby also equalizes a Multinational state with a Helstat.

la Cour's take on the Helstat

"It was, however, in the aim of the new government of the two kingdoms to create a distinctly centralized Helstat, and within such a framework local considerations had to naturally always give way to what, according to the opinion of the time, would serve the assembled Monarch"

— Vilhelm la Cour: Mellem brødre. Dansk-norske Problemer i det 18. Aarhundredes Helstat,1943, s. 9-10

Jensen's book on Denmark-Norway seems to be the only one referring to the Helstat, as that of Denmark and the Duchies. He defines the goal of the Helstat as being to achieve the biggest possible commonwealth and entity. He thereby also devalues the Helstat with Denmark and the Duchies characterizing it as incomplete, and instead highlights the union with Norway as the complete version of a Helstat. Although Jensen has no source for the definition he uses.

La Cour, defines the Helstat as an act of Absolute monarchy and unity, in contrast to the other definitions. Such a definition is shared by Ole Feldbæk, who in his book Danmark-Norge 1380-1814, describes the Helstat in a contrast to Norwegian independence and autonomy.

=== Historic usage in reference to Denmark and the duchies ===
There are also problems with the argumentation of the historians describing and defining the unitary

Helstaten

Denmark-Norway c 1780

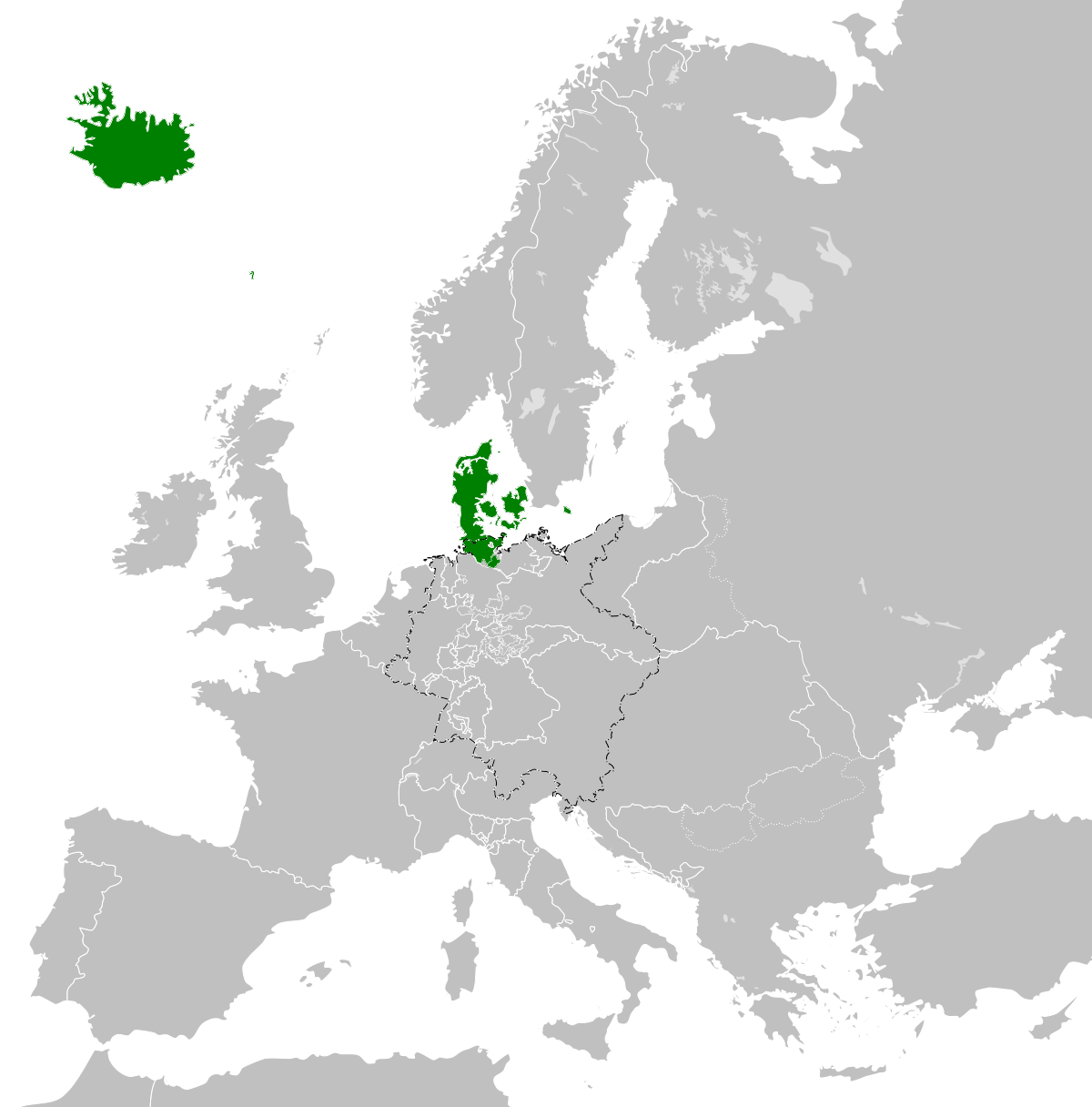
Lands ruled by the Monarch of Denmark, c. 1815

state between Denmark and the duchies of Schleswig, Holstein, and Lauenburg. (also referred to as "the Duchies"; Danish: Hertugdømmerne)

According to Claus Bjørn the term Helstaten only became politically relevant after the Three Years War and links the term with the period between 1848 and 1863. He also notes that the traditional usage of the word for historians can be traced back to 1773 in the Treaty of Tsarskoye Selo.

Christian Molbech

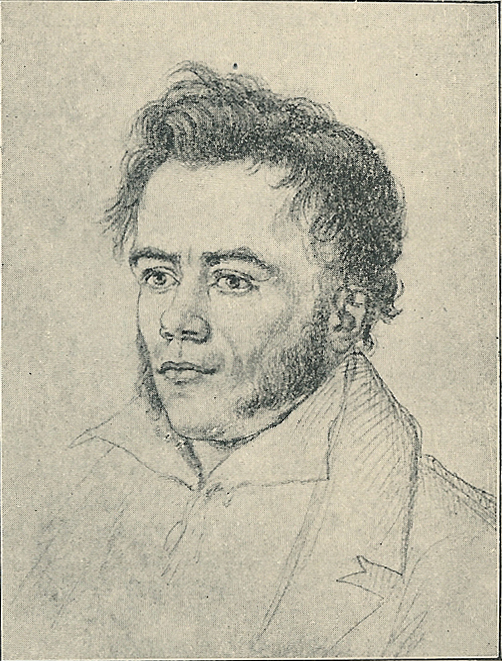
Drawing by A. Jensen

The reason being that Christian VII of Denmark got full control of Ducal Holstein after Tsarskoye Selo.

During the aftermath of the First Schleswig War the usage of the word became politically relevant in terms of creating a united constitution for both Denmark and the Duchies. The term is mentioned in a Danish state council protocol from a reference on the 21 December 1850, from a dairy of Christian Dahl from 1848 to 1849 and especially from letters from Danish politicians, such as Ditlev Gothard Monrad and Andreas Frederik Krieger in the 1830s and 1840s.

There is no exact date accepted for the first usage of the political word of Helstaten, although just as Bjørn argues, Christian Molbech states that the term originated in 1848. Nevertheless, the usage of the term saw an increase, especially politically, during the negotiations of a constitution to the Danish realm.

== Political ideology ==
The idea of preserving the Helstat is called Helstatspatriotisme (English: The Unitary State Patriotism), its ideology is focused on valuing and preserving the Danish-led Oldenburg Monarchy and to stop the spread of Nationalism in the possessions of the dynasty. Nationalism had been rising since the French revolution and was a founding part of social changes in the Danish realm during the 19th century. The old state formation, made by royal houses and feudalism, was challenged by nationalism and liberalism, and the Helstatspatriotisme were in a position to preserve the old state formation of the Oldenburg monarchy. The Oldenburg state is said to be Dano-German from the beginning. Especially during the 17th and 18th centuries when German language and culture began to influence the Danish nobility, whose majority had German as their first language.

Before the waiver of Norway, 25% of Denmark, spoke German, that number rose to 40% during the aftermath of the Treaty of Kiel. In the capital of Copenhagen, 20% spoke German, and in other cities like Odense, Fredericia, and Elsinore, there was a notable German-speaking population. The separation of Danish and German in Denmark and Schleswig should therefore not be seen as necessary for the creation of a national state.

This rise of the German culture in Denmark led to several unrests and clashes between the Danes and Germans, like the Royal Guards Mutiny in 1771 as a response to the alleged Germanisation of Denmark by Struensee, and the German Feud (Danish: Tyskerfejden) which sought to disestablish German occupation of important political and cultural jobs.

Ove Høegh-Guldberg

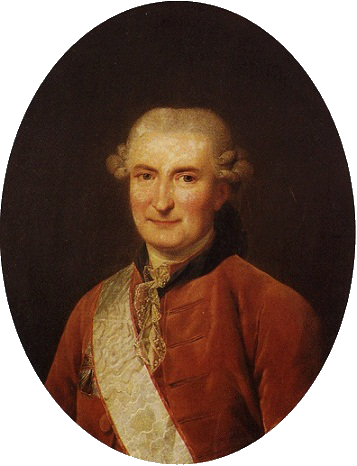
Drawing by Jens Juel

=== Ideology in early use ===
After the reforms by Struensee, the power of government was succeeded by Ove Høegh-Guldberg, who reformed the state into a more Danish-centered one rather than German-centered. Laws like the Danish Citizenship Act of 1776 under which access to public positions in the kingdom of Denmark became the prerogative of native-born subjects and those who were considered their equals. Danish also became the official language of The Danish military, and Politicians and administrators should also use Danish instead of German. The takeover and reforms by Høegh-Guldberg were done in a matter, where he legitimized his rule by representing the Danish people and may also appear to be an early form of Danish nationalism and Helstatspatriotisme. During his rule and beyond, Helstatspatriotismen was prioritized by symbolically uniting Denmark, Norway, and Holstein as three equal parts under the Oldenburg Dynasty (Note: Before the conflict over the Duchies in the mid-1800s, Schleswig was not referred to as one independent entity, but was simply included as a fief under 'Denmark'.) in art and literature. By that the Danish government wished to establish loyalty to the monarch throughout the whole realm.

=== Danification attempts in Holstein (1806-1813) ===
Holstein

A map of the Duchy of Holstein, in Europe c 1789

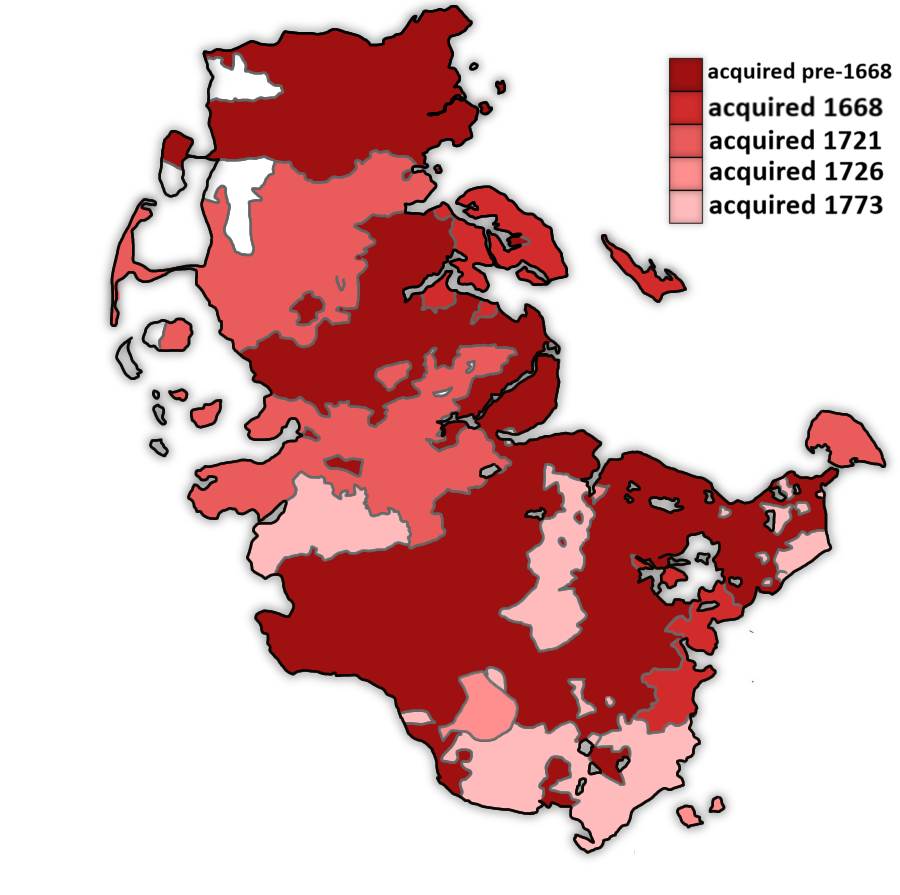
Unification process of Holstein (1668–1773)

After the dissolution of the Holy Roman Empire, Crown Prince Frederick annexed, in accordance with the French, Holstein into the Danish state. The act was official policy since the Treaty of Tsarskoye Selo and can be seen as an act for Helstatspatriotismen. The period between 1806 and 1813 saw increasing Danification of the area. The Danish language was sought to be implemented in offices and churches, yet even if the intention was to quell Holsteinian regionalism, it did the exact opposite and the annexation attempt was denounced in 1813. Modern historian, Steen Bo Frandsen, argues that if the annexation attempt had not been implemented, then there would still be Holsteinians who wished for further integration into the Danish state long after 1814. It is also argued that before nationalist sentiment began to rise, the major view in Holstein was that the connection to the Oldenburg monarch was a positive thing.

== Napoleonic Wars ==
Bombardment of Copenhagen

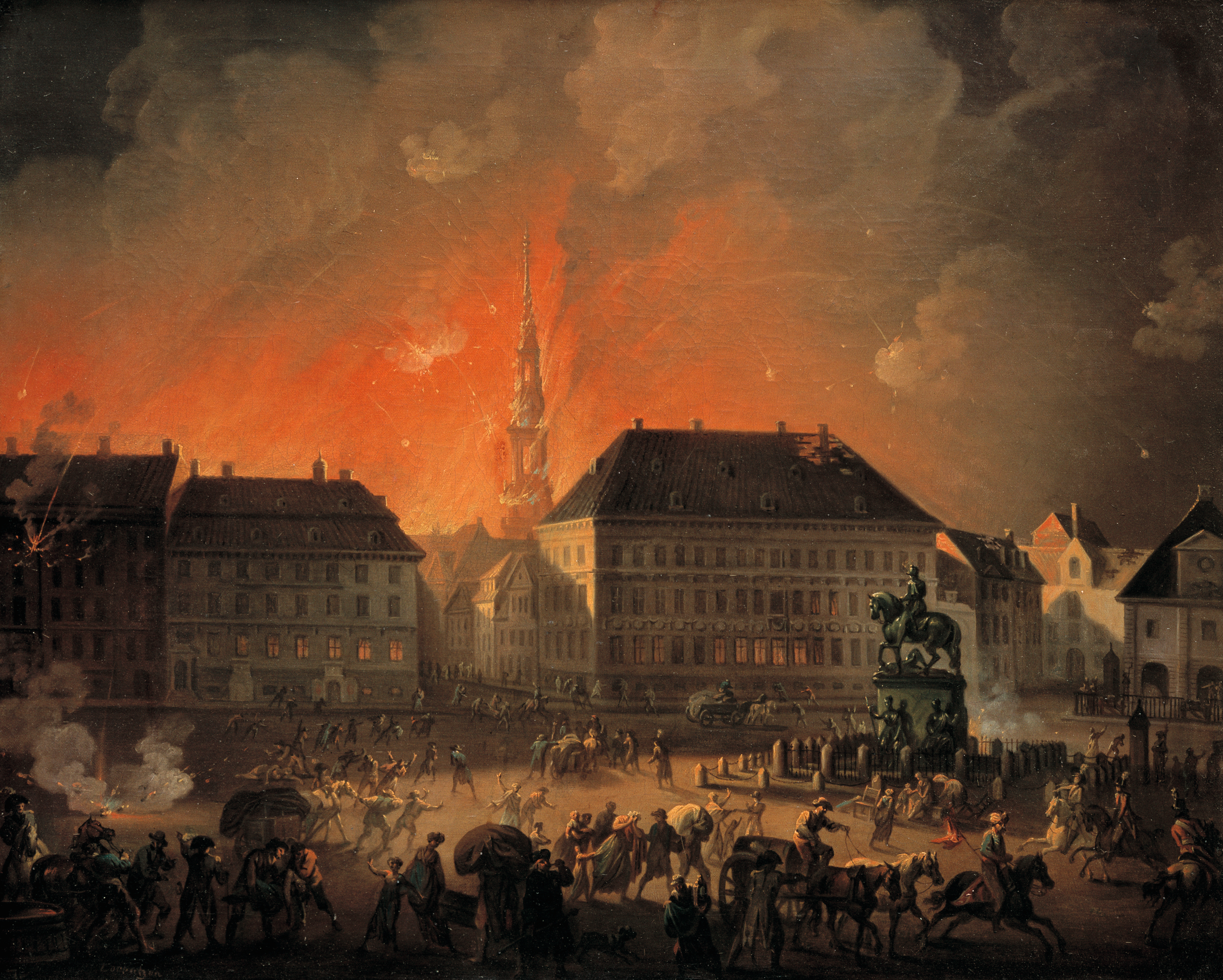
View of Kongens Nytorv in Copenhagen During the English Bombardment of Copenhagen at Night between 4 and 5 September 1807

During the Napoleonic Wars Denmark came through a series of national disasters. Firstly Denmark-Norway lost its fleet during the English Wars, which greatly damaged Dano-Norwegian trade commerce and connection between the Atlantic territories (Note: The "Atlantic territories" refer to Iceland, Faroe Islands and Greenland), Norway and Denmark. Secondly Denmark faced the Danish state bankruptcy of 1813 which saw the total collapse of the financial industry and trade industry. Lastly, Denmark was forced on Napoleon's side and after a short war with Sweden and occupation of Schleswig and Holstein signed for peace at Kiel in 1814. This saw the loss of Norway, and a dream of a trio with Denmark, Norway, and Holstein demolished. Frederick VI who was a natural supporter of the Helstatspatriotisme, had earlier declined an offer from tzar Alexander I of Russia, which in turn for handing over Norway, Denmark would get the Hanseatic cities, the North German East Coast, and even Holland Which shows Frederick's realization of the importance of Norway, for the Helstat.

Likewise, under the Napoleonic wars, the lands north of the Elbe did not show any unwillingness or dissatisfaction with the French presence in Germany. This view was not shared with the rest of the German states.

Frederick VI

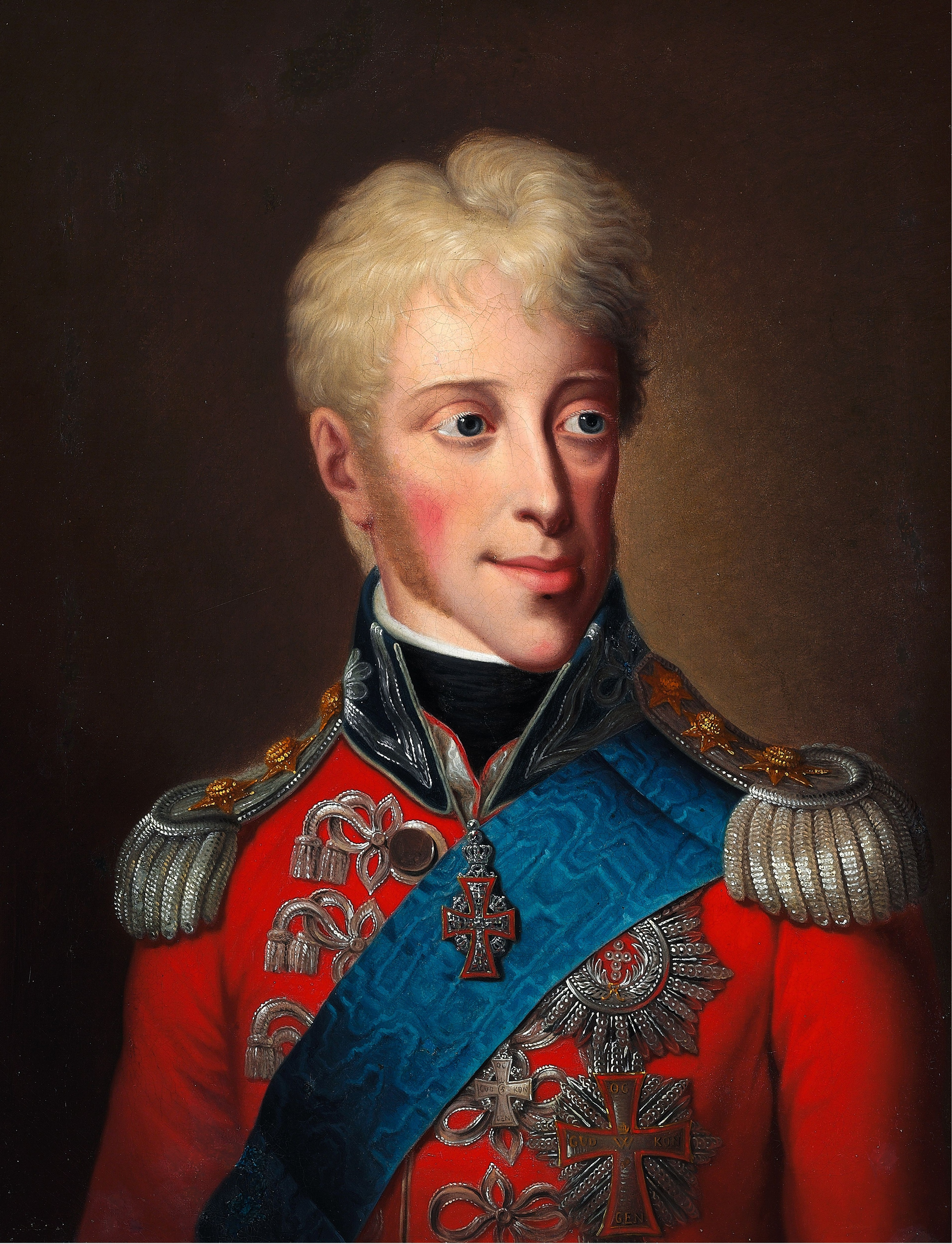
Portrait of Frederick c1809

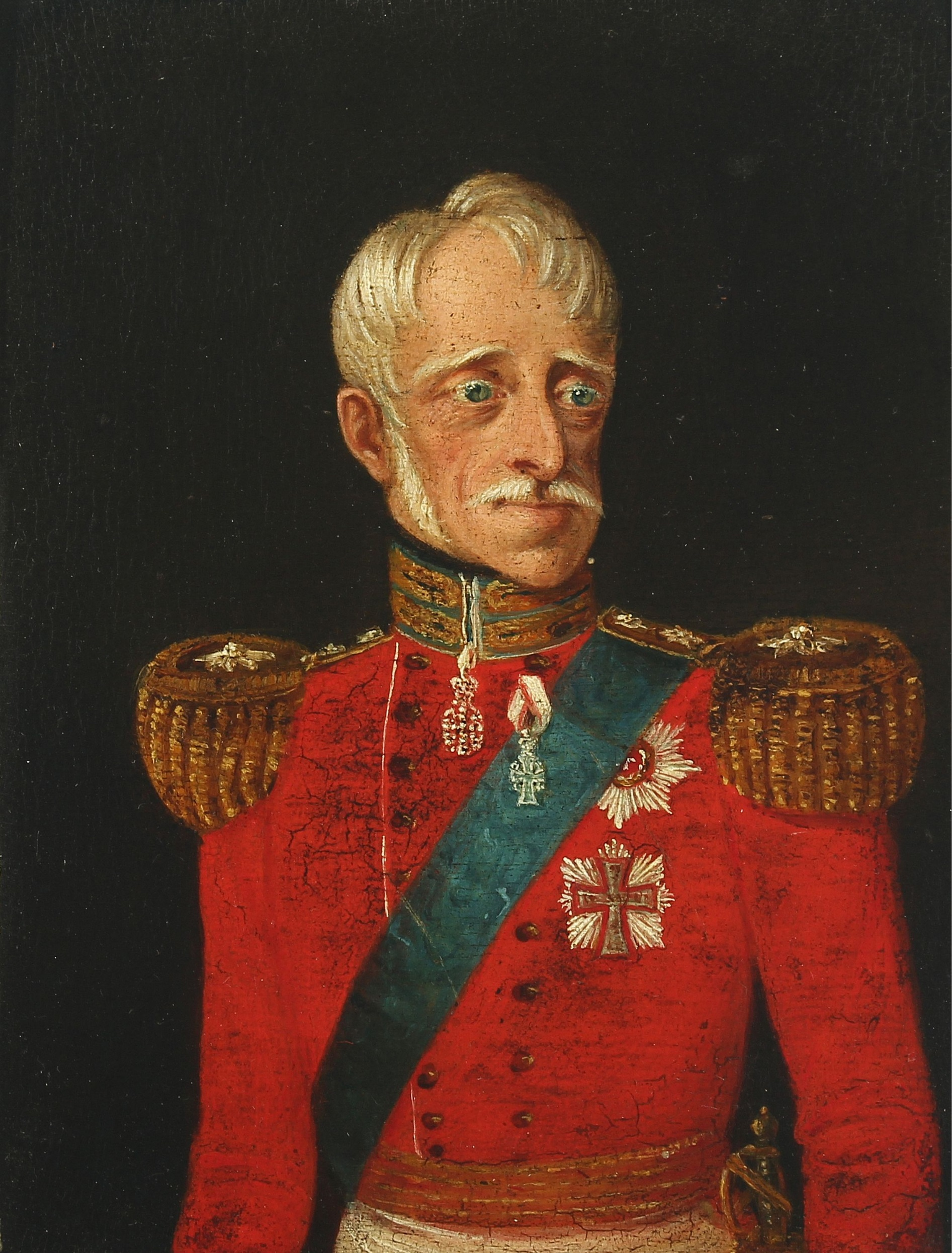
Portrait of Frederick c1830

There was a short German national excitement during the German campaign of 1813, yet that excitement was gone with the creation of the German Confederation, which did not turn out as the German national liberals hoped for. Although during the rise of German Nationalism in the mid-19th century, the Holsteinians became embarrassed with the Oldenburg monarch's decision to join forces with Napoleon, and the Holsteinian nationalists portrayed themselves as victims, who were prevented from fighting with their German brothers. This, along with the Danification attempt of Holstein, made the Holsteinian elite look more to the south.

The Napoleonic wars were costly for Denmark and destabilized the build-up of Helstatspatriotisme. The German-speaking minority went from 25% to 40% after 1815, which meant that Germans were now, not just a small minority in a bigger and more multicultural realm, but a notable minority and rival to the Danish-speaking population, which led to the Schleswig–Holstein question.

== 1815-1847 ==
Denmark exchanged Swedish Pomerania in turn for Saxe-Lauenburg from Prussia. This meant a further enlargement of German culture in the realm. This is also the time of the Danish Golden Age, which sought to Romantisize Danish nature, culture, and nationality. The movement became relevant after the national emergencies the nation faced during the 1810s and glorified Danish history.

=== Unrest ===
What lay under the "golden age" of Denmark, was an impoverished society. King Frederick, who had a clear goal to preserve Helstat with Norway, became more authoritarian, giving up his liberal worldview he had during his rule as Prince Regent. However, as the economic depression eased in the 1830s, Frederick accepted a minor democratic innovation of regional assemblies in 1834. There were established four regional assemblies. One for Jutland, one for Schleswig, one for Holstein, and one for Zealand and the Danish Isles. c 3% of the population had suffrage in these assemblies. Even though the regional assemblies were made to advise the absolute monarchy, they eventually developed in opposition to the king, and among other things, made demands to a free constitution. These regional assemblies unintendedly lead to civil debate and Social polarization in Schleswig between Danes and Germans.

=== Schleswig-Holstein question ===
Schleswig-Holstein

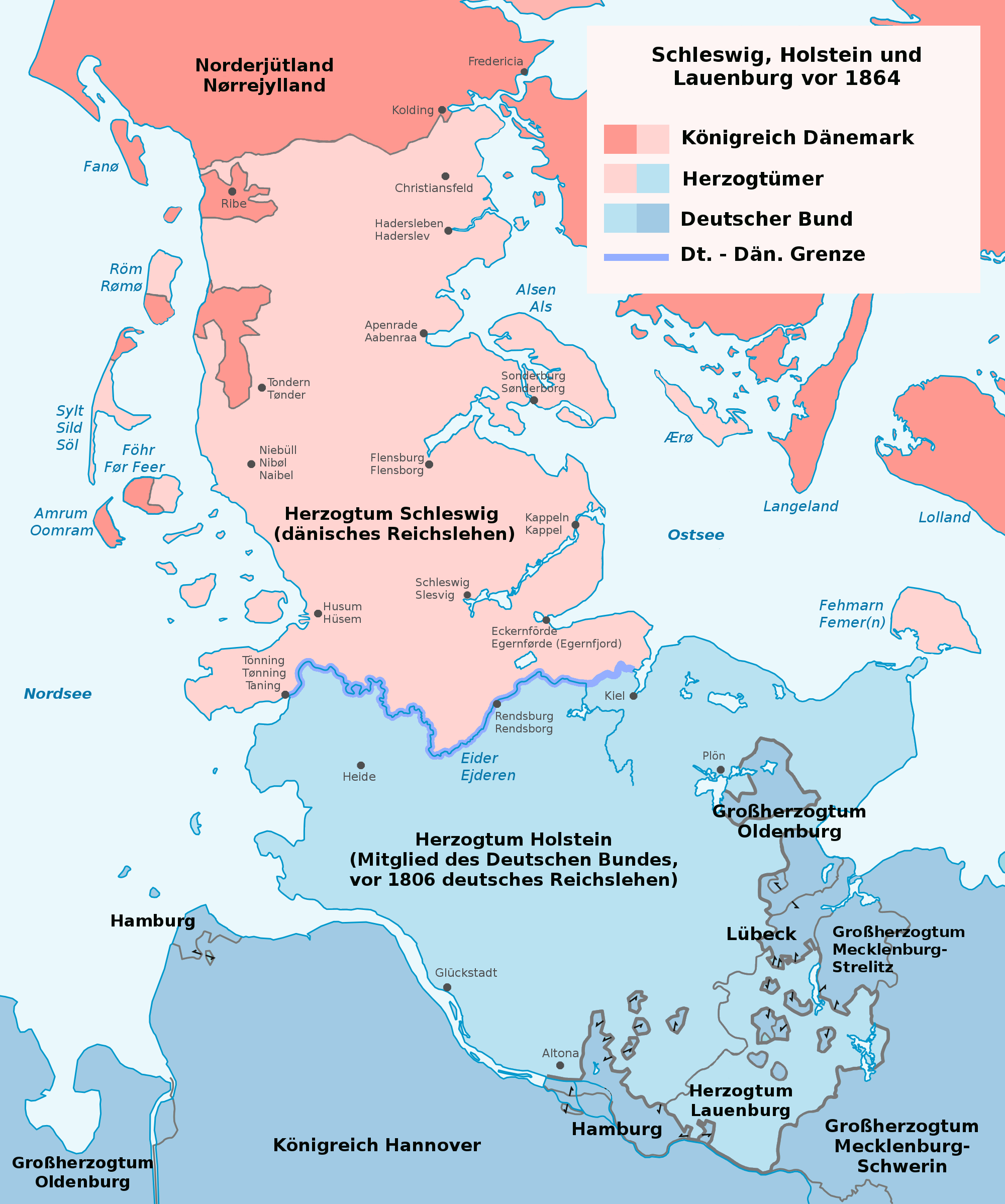
Political status quo in Schleswig and Holstein between 1815 and 1864

The polarization of the Helstat became actual during the 1830s, were two political and national movements had developed in the Helstat. They both wanted the disestablishment of the absolute monarch and wished for the division of the Helstat in linguistic borders. The question of the future of the duchies also became ever more relevant and caused tension in the Helstat. The National Liberal Party campaigned for Schleswig to become an integral part of Denmark while separating Holstein and Lauenburg from Denmark. While German nationalists in Schleswig were keen to keep Schleswig and Holstein together, and wanted Schleswig to join the German Confederation. The National Liberal Party campaigned with the slogan "Danmark til ejderen" (English: Denmark to the Eider) and the German nationalists in Schleswig-Holstein campaigned with a contradicting slogan to that of the Danish national liberals, called "up ewig ungedeelt" (English: Forever undivided).

The reigns of Frederick VI and Christian VIIIled to only minor democratic innovations, and the King's Law, Europe's only formal absolutist constitution, was still in place.

== 1848-1863 ==
In January 1848, Christian VIII of Denmark died. He was succeeded by his son Frederick VII. Frederick became king during the Revolutions of 1848. And the newly rising demands for a free constitution became ever more relevant.

=== First Schleswig War ===
Jens Wulff on the Schleswig Wars

"… the whole world seems to be intoxicated, and this accursed partisanship dominates everywhere, alas making enemies of those who previously were friends. Woe to those who have brought this about. Germans and Danes lived so peacefully together in times past, but now within the same country the different nationalities face each other with enmity"

— Inge Adriansen and Jens Ole Christensen: The First Schleswig War, p. 13
Schleswig-Holstein

The civil flag of Schleswig-Holstein, then considered revolutionary

In March 1848, the Schleswig-Holstein question became increasingly intense, and an ultimatum from Schleswig and Holstein was publicized. Political pressure from the National Liberals intensified, and Frederick VII replaced the government with the Moltke I cabinet. This saw the rejection of the German demands and led to their provisional government. contingents in Schleswig, now had to choose to go north, to join the Danish army, or go south to join the Schleswig-Holstein army. This ethnic division split and divided many families in Schleswig. This is also the case of the future king, Christian of Schleswig-Holstein-Sonderburg-Beck, who stayed in the Danish army, while his brothers joined the revolutionary forces in the south. There were also still some supporters of the unified Helstat, who rejected the ideas of the both nationalistic Danes and Germans. One of Them being Jens Wulff. Opinions like his were found everywhere, but especially in Northern Schleswig, who too, had little support for splitting the Helstat.

Empress of Russia

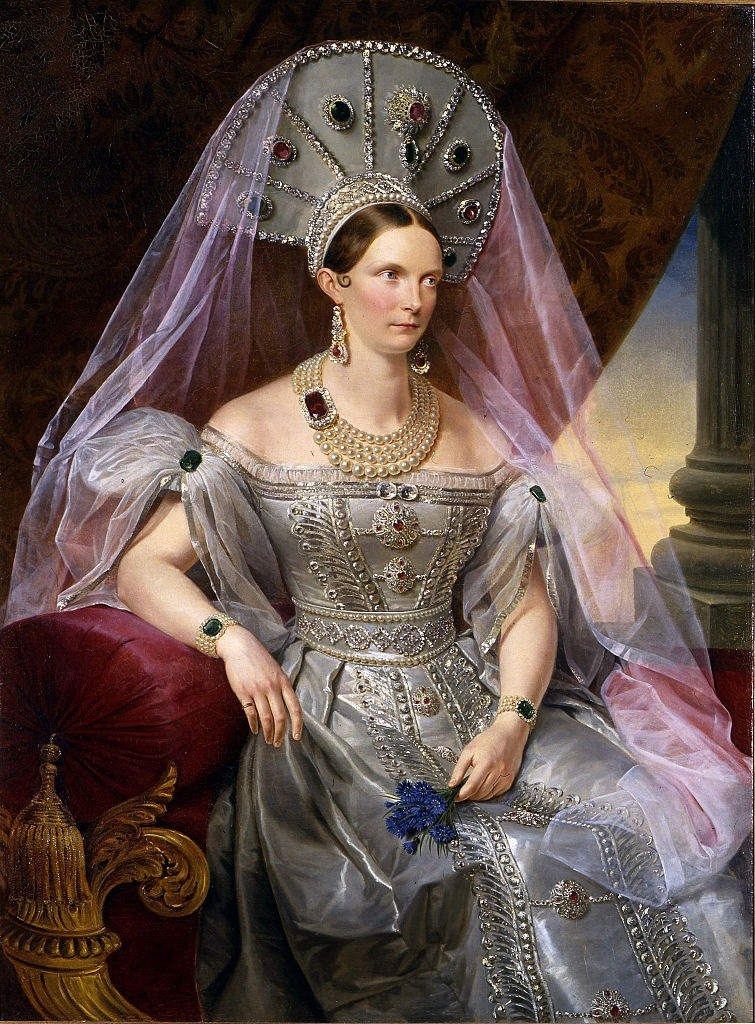
Portrait of Alexandra Feodorovna (Charlotte of Prussia), by Franz Krüger

The rebellion officially started when Prince Frederick of Schleswig-Holstein, took the border fortress of Rendsburg. The war quickly spread, and the German forces took Flensburg on the 31 of March, although the German advancement was stopped at Bov. During April Prussian troops arrived to help the revolutionaries and took Fredericia in May. The Prussian advance was stopped at Dybbøl. In the end, the Prussian intervention in the war was decided by the Russian Diplomatic intervention. As head of the senior Gottorp line, Tsar Nicholas I of Russia pointed out the risk of collision with Frederick William IV of Prussia. The tsar noted the Prussian advance in Jutland as extremely unfriendly and seriously injured the interests of all the powers bordering on the Baltic. The Russian Empress, Alexandra Feodorovna supported the point by writing to her brother. (Note: Alexandra Feodorovna, born Princess Charlotte of Prussia, Were daughter of Frederick William III, and was thereby a sister to the Prussian king Frederick William IV)

"It is your troops who have grabbed the weak Denmark with their superior force. The war can be expanded widely if you pursue it. Stop! There is still time! Think about the difficulties Germany has to battle in order to bring about inner security, the dangers which threaten in the West. Do not force upon the Tsar the necessity to come to the assistance with strong measures of another state whose downfall Russia cannot regard with indifference and will not tolerate. It cannot come to pass that Denmark is absorbed into Germany; of this you can be certain."

— Alexandra Feodorovna (Charlotte of Prussia)

Battles

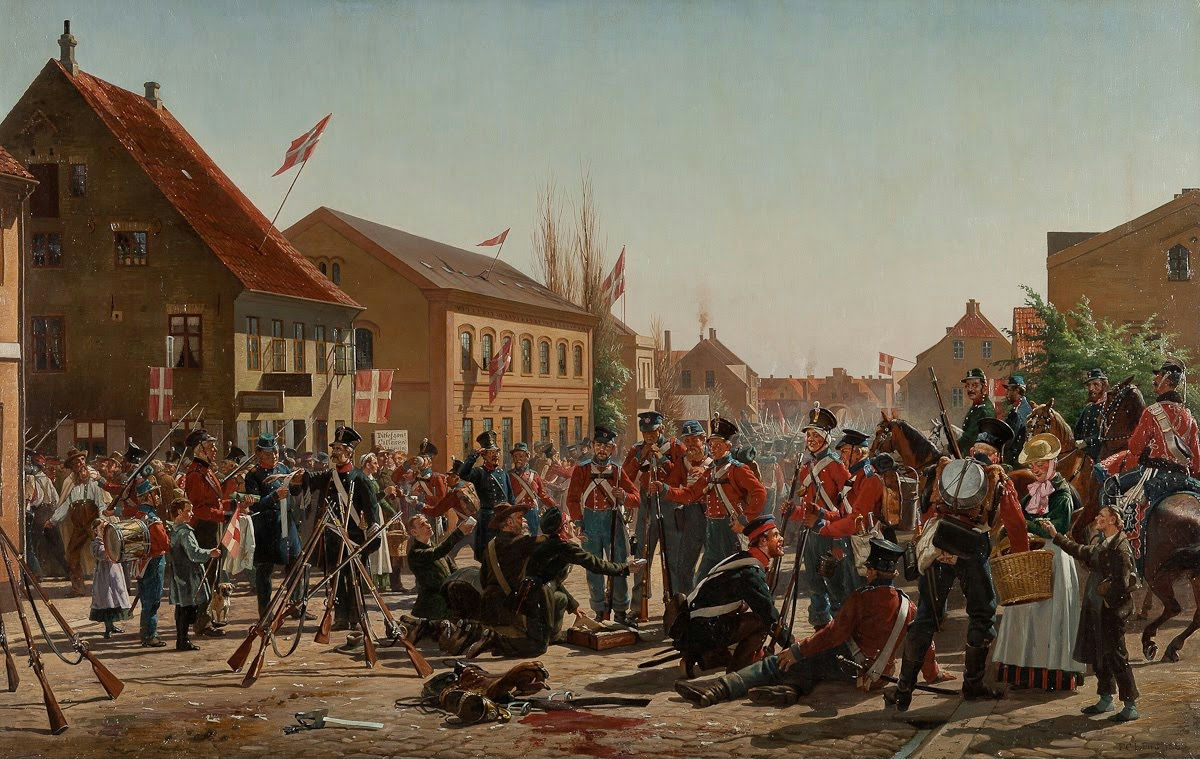
After the Battle of Bov, Danish Soldiers Entering Flensburg

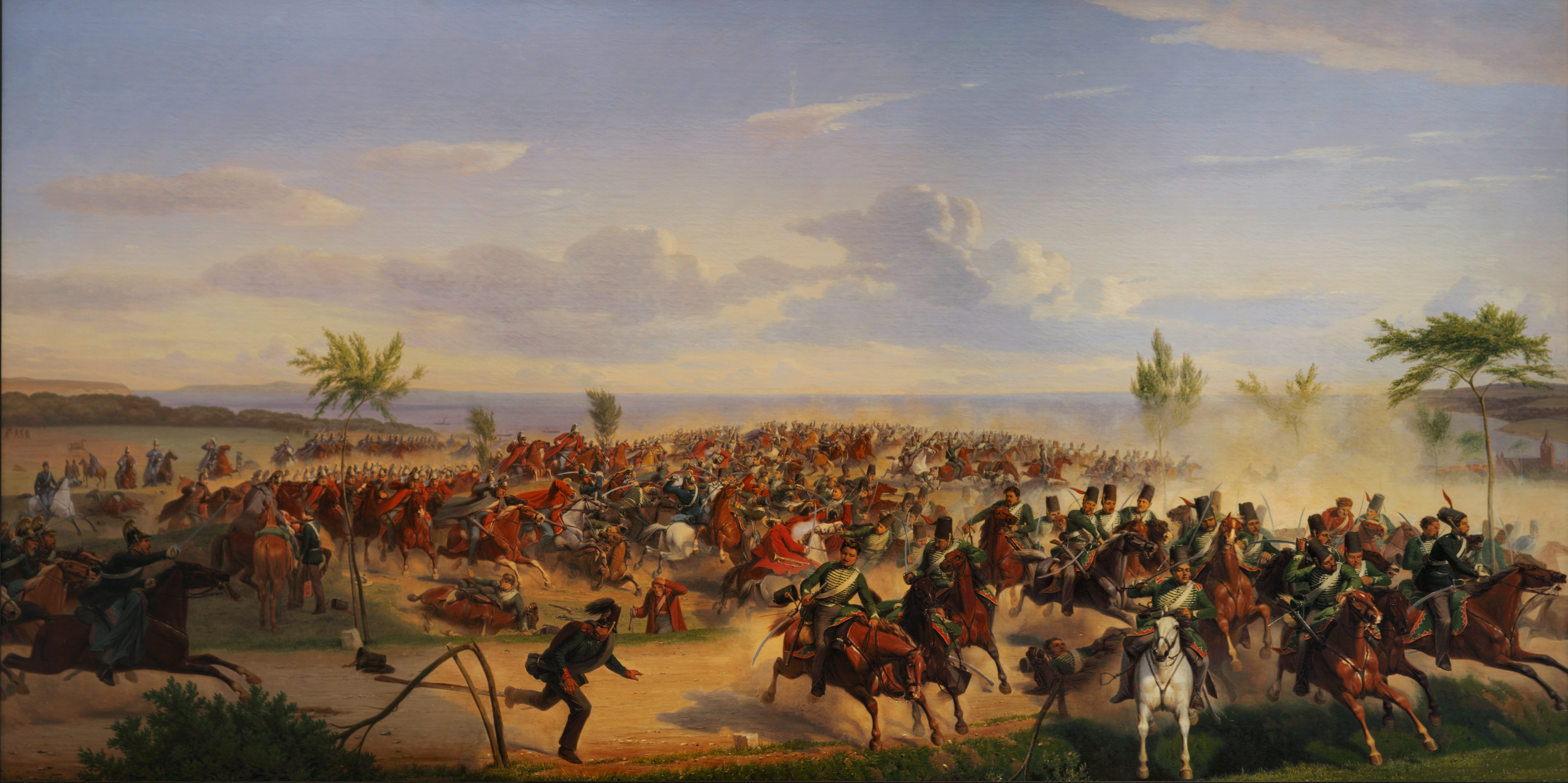
Skirmish at Aarhus, 31 May 1849

The increasing threat of intervention by other European powers led to Prussia signing the Armistice of Malmö. This would stop all fighting until spring 1849 when the armistice had ended. Prussian forces again invaded Jutland, yet were stopped at Aarhus. Danish victories continued at Fredericia. Another truce was signed, and Prussia proposed a status quo ante bellum. The Russian tsar had promised Schleswig to the Danish crown by the 1773 Treaty of Tsarskoye Selo and had also intervened in the Hungarian revolution, so the threat of Russian military intervention became over more realistic. After two more years of minor skirmishes and countless negotiations, the London Protocol was signed.

=== Constitutions for The Unitary State ===
Monarchs

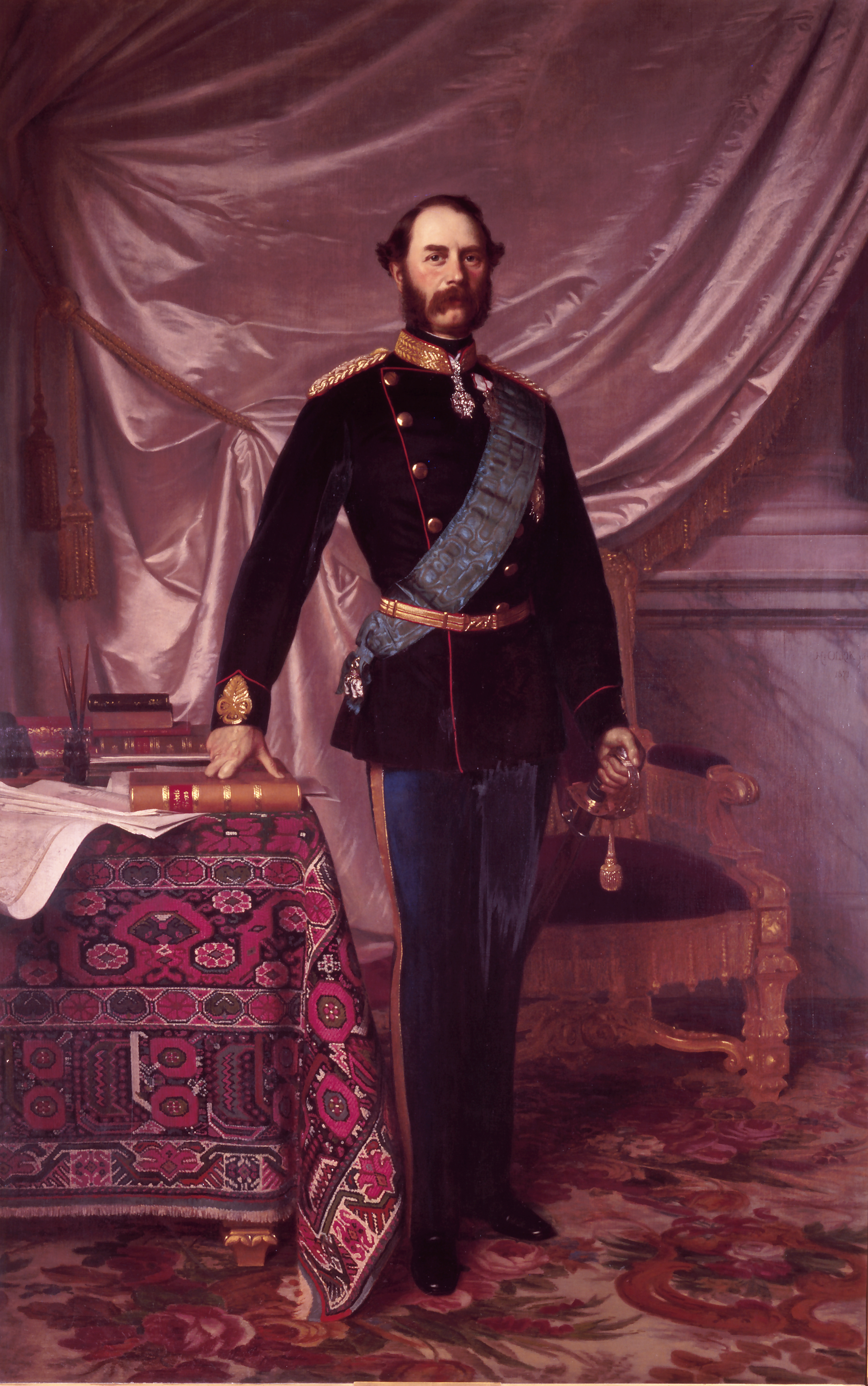
Christian IX in 1871

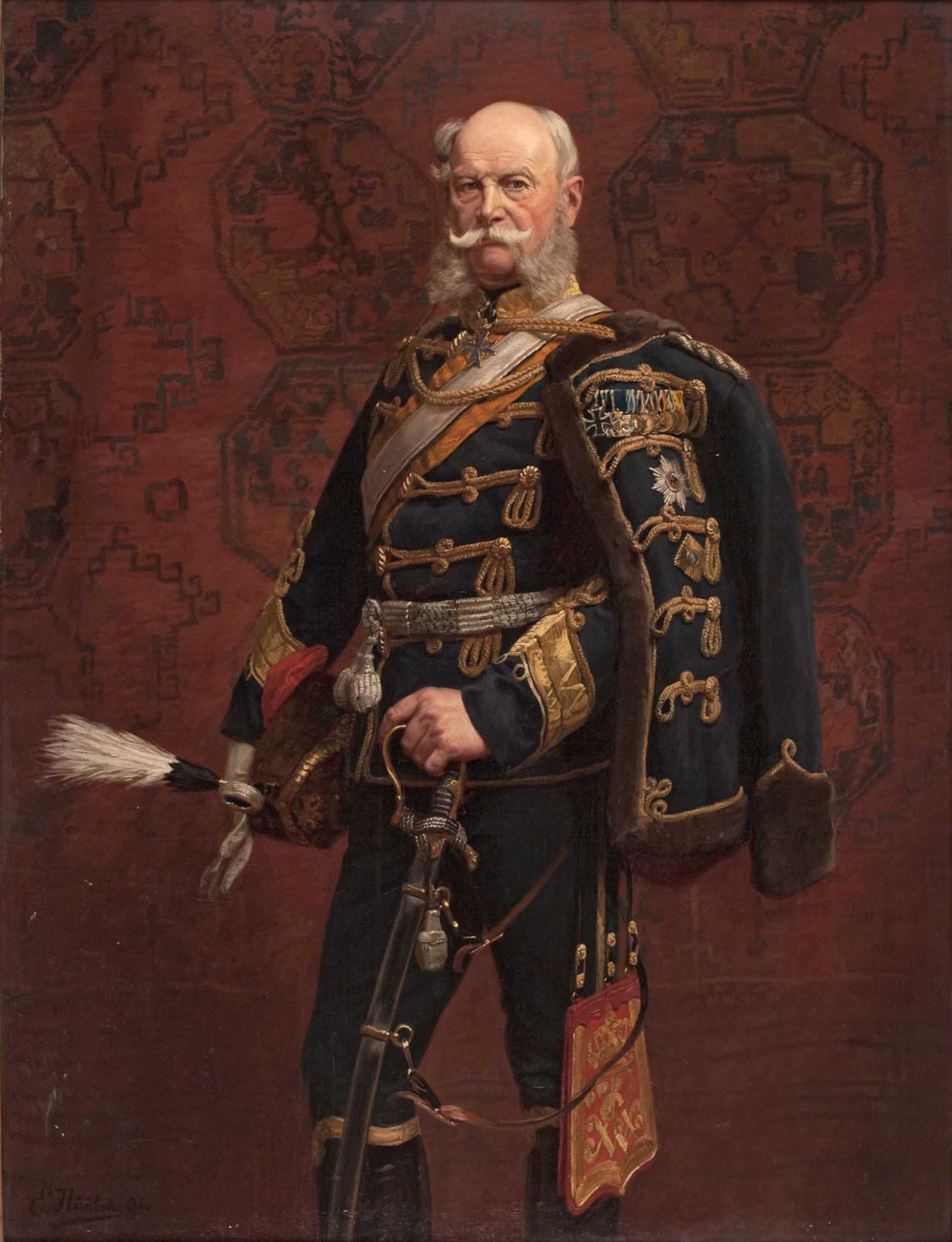
Kaiser William in Royal Dress up

According to the London Protocol, the Great powers decided in Danish favour, that the Danish unitary state should be preserved. Yet it also confined with the duchies, by disallowing further integration of a single duchy, into the Danish state. Since the June constitution created in 1849 was only put in force in Denmark, the Schleswig-Holstein question remained unsolved and work for creating a common constitution started. In 1855 the rigsdagen accepted the Constitution for The Unitary State (Danish: Helstatsforfatning) or Fællesforfatningen (English: The common constitution). The constitution were put in place in all of the Danish realm, including the Duchies. However it was, three years later in 1858, rejected by Holstein and Lauenburg.

When Frederick VII of Denmark died in 1863, the National Liberals pressured the newly king, in accordance with the London protocol, King Christian IX, to sign a new constitution in November 1863, the so-called November constitution (Danish: Novemberforfatningen). The constitution replaced the Helstatsforfatning and annexed Schleswig into Denmark.

Maps

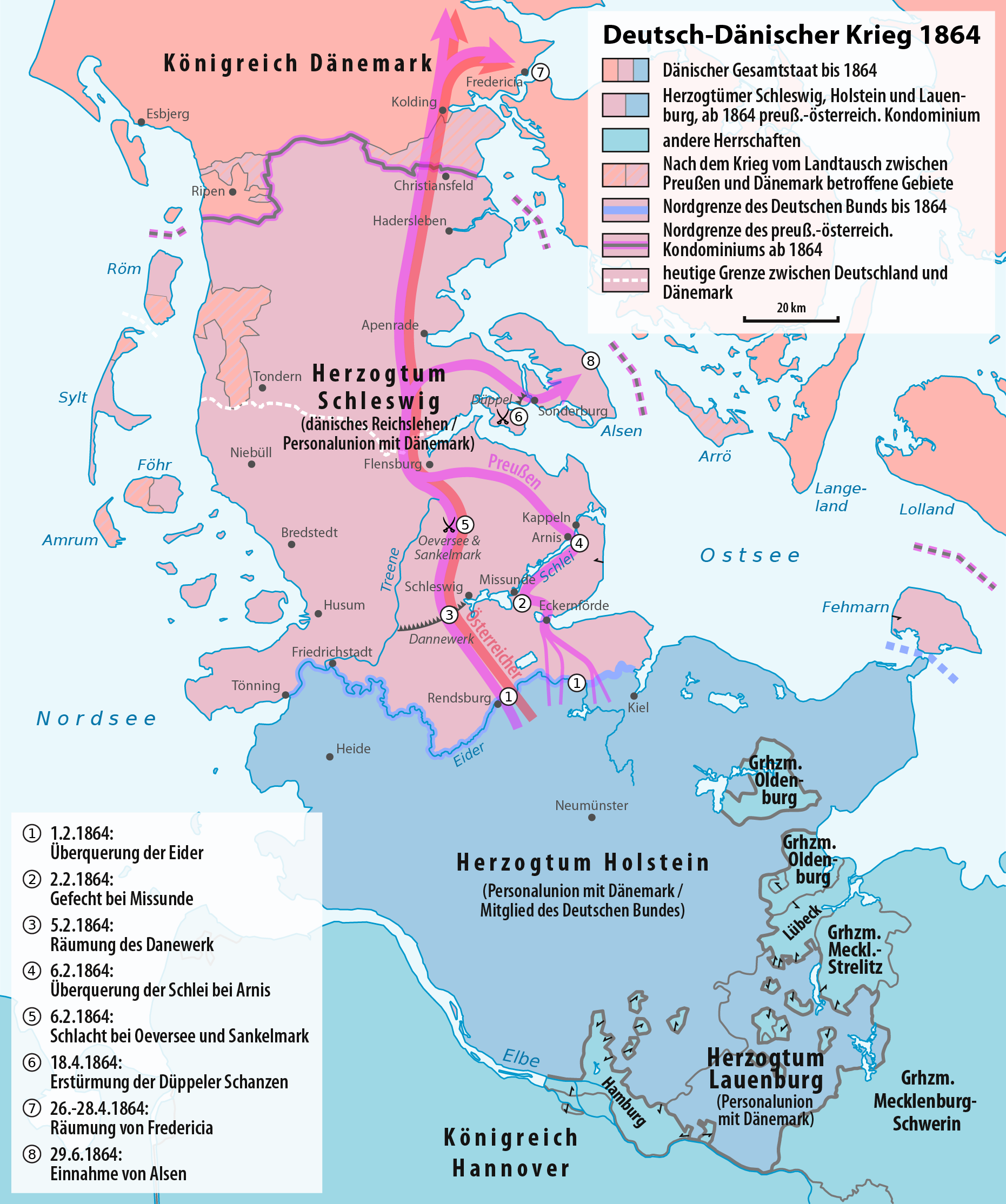
Map of the military events and of the boundary changes during the Second Schleswig War.

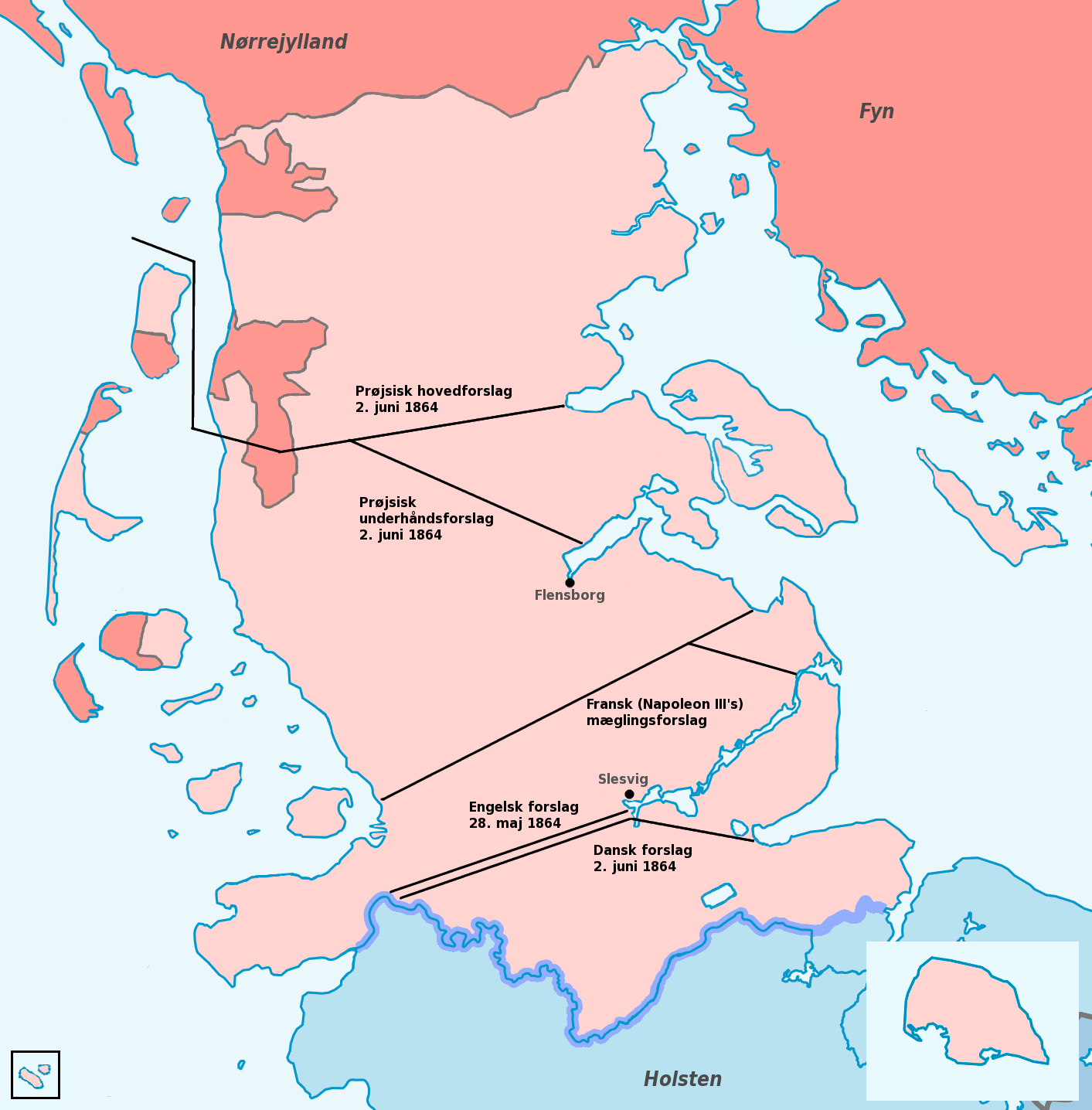
Boundary proposals at the London Conference 1864

== Dissolution, 1864-1866 ==
Massive protests followed, and since the constitution broke the promises of the London Protocol, Prussia, and Austria declared war in early 1864 on behalf of the German Confederation. This started the War of 1864.

=== Second Schleswig War ===
With approximately 60.000 men the Prusso-Austrian army marched into Schleswig. The Danes evacuated the ancient defense line of Danewerk and instead fortified the flank position of Dybbøl. Throughout early April, Dybbøl was heavily bombarded, and on the morning of the 18 of April, the Prussians launched an all-out assault on the Danish fortifications. The Danes were overrun by the Prussian military and retreated to Als, where they too, were defeated. The Danes lost 8.000 men at Dybbøl and Als, and in two months the Danish army had lost over 20% of its army. The Prussians afterward proposed a peace to Denmark, even letting Denmark keep Northern Schleswig. Yet the Danes rejected, and it would take the occupation of all of Jutland before king Christian would settle for peace. Christian, desperate to preserve the Helstat even proposed Denmark, to join the German confederation, in return for him still being duke in Schleswig, Holstein, and Saxe-Lauenburg. Yet the proposal was rejected in fear of a troublesome Danish minority in the German Confederation. In the end, the treaty of Vienna was signed on 30 October 1864 and Denmark ended up losing all three duchies.

The connection between Schleswig and Holstein meant that Denmark could have won Holstein through Schleswig - instead, they lost Schleswig through Holstein.

=== Aftermath and The Revised Constitution (1866) ===
The war of 1864 is considered a national trauma for Denmark. The Helstat was no more and the prime minister of Denmark, Ditlev Gothard Monrad resigned on 11 July 1864. The National Liberal Party would see its downfall and would be dissolved in 1882. King Christian and the other politicians would seek to create a new constitution, which was made in 1866, which further Democratized the nation.

Denmark was now a state consisting of only Danes, and would even reject the full annexation of Schleswig in 1920, in order not to gain any considerable minority of Germans on its southern border, this would start the Easter Crisis between the monarch and government.

== See also ==
- Habsburg monarchy – Monarchy in Europe (1282–1918)
- Denmark–Norway – Political union (1537–1814)
- federation – Political union of partially self-governing territories under a national government
- Kingdom of the Netherlands (1815-1839) – European territory (1815–1839)
- Schleswig-Holstein – State in Germany
- House of Romanov – Imperial dynasty of Russia (1613–1917)
