= De Meza House =

Listed building in Helsingør, Denmark

- De Mezas Gård
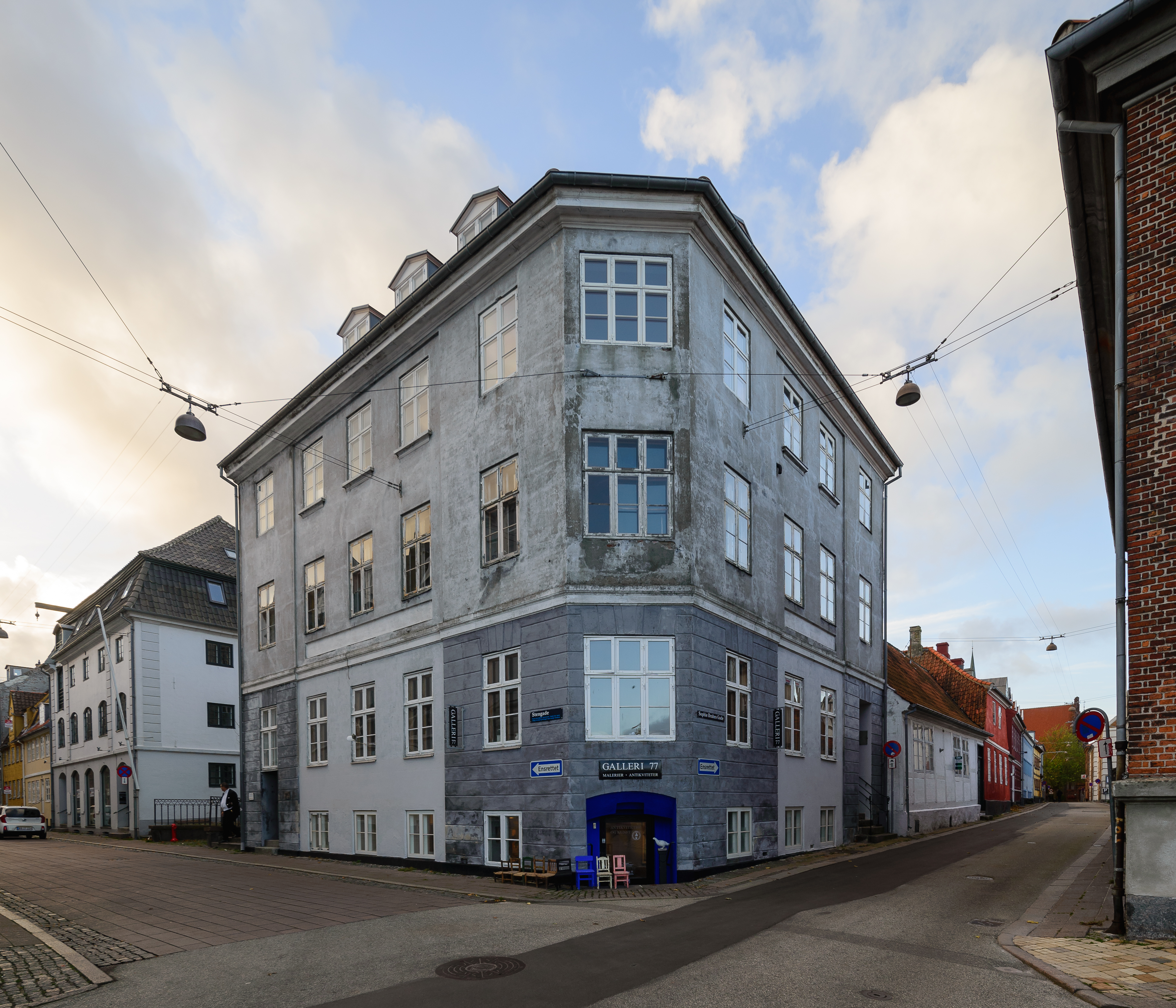
- Interactive map of the De Meza House area

General information
- Location: Helsingør, Stengade 77/Sophie Barhesgade 5A, 3000 Helsingør, Denmark
- Coordinates: 56°2′8.3″N 12°36′54.4″E
- Construction started: 1835 (Stengade 77); 1736 (Sophie Brahes Gade 5B)

The De Meza House (Danish: De Mezas Gård) is a property situated at the corner of Stengade (No. 77) and Sophie Brahes Gade (No. 5 A–B) in central Helsingør, Denmark. It consists of a three-storey corner building from 1835 and a single-storey, half-timbered secondary wing from the 18th century on Sophie Brahes Gade. The two buildings were both listed in the Danish registry of protected buildings and places in 1945.

== History ==
=== Van Deurs family ===
The previous building on the site was a single-storey, half-timbered building with an 11-bay-long facade towards Stengade and a 12-bay-long facade towards Sophie Brahes Gade. It belonged to Arendt van Deur (1683–1747) from at least 1704 to 1736.

Arendt van Deus' father had come to Helsingør from Haarlem in Noord-Holland. Arendt van Deurs was married twice, first to Sophia Hedewig Geissen and then to Frederikke Elisabeth Giese (1698–1771). The latter continued his trading firm as Salig Arendt van Deurs Enke (Late Arendt van Deurs' Widow) with her son Jean Cjristopher van Deurs and son-in-law Andreas Vlassen as management. . The firm was later based in the Stephen Hansen Mansion.

=== Changing owners ===
The property at the corner of Stengade and Sophie Brahes Gade belonged to one colonel lieutenant Ochsen in 1761. In 1771, it was acquired by one generalauditør Lassen.

=== Christian Jacob Theophilus de Meza ===
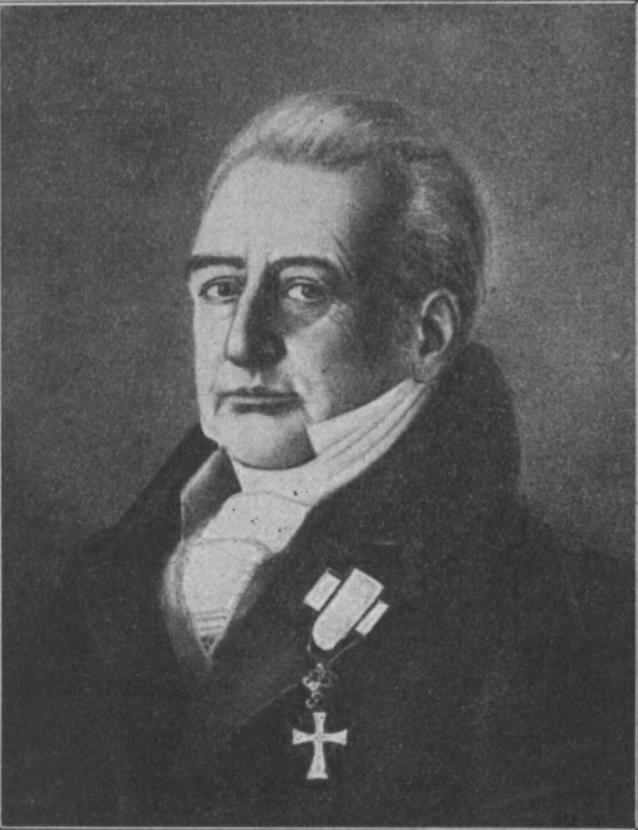
Christian Jacob Theophilus de Meza.png.

In 1791, Christian Jacob Theophilus de Meza (1756–1844) bought the property. He was the first chief physician at the new Øresund Jospital. He was later appointed as city physician in Helsingør. He was the father of Christian Julius de Meza (1792–1865). In In 1798, De Meza bought the Trentwedel House (Stengade 81). In 1801, he sold his old house to pastor Elias Lauritz Grüner. He was also active as a book printer. In 1810, De Meza sold the Trentwedel House to Charles Thalbitzer (1772–1814). In 1811, Grüner parted with the property at the corner of Stengade and Sophie Brahes Gade. Chief accountant at Øresund Customs House Georg Christopher Hauch )1751–1823) is mentioned as the owner of the property in 1817. In 1827, it was reacquired by Christian Jacob Theophilus de Meza.

=== Lemmich and the new building ===
In 1835, Generalmajor Jobst Conrad Hirsch Lemmich (1798–1866) bought the building. The present building on the site was constructed for him shortly thereafter. Generalmajor Jobst Conrad Hirsch Lemmich was born in Trondheim. In 1813, he became a second lieutenant in the Norwegian Life Regiment. In 1814, he transferred to Kronborg Regiment in Helsingør (captain in 1834; vagtmesterløktnant in 1842; kaptajnsvagtmester in 1844).

During the First Schleswig War, he was severely wounded in the Battle of Fredericia. In 1852, Lemmich was appointed as chief of the 12th Light Infantry Vatallion in Fredericia. In 1856, he was also appointed as commandant of Fredericia. After his retirement, with rank of Major-General, in 1864, he returned to his house in Helsingør. He died in Helsingør on 12 April 1866.

== Architecture ==
The corner building Stengade 77(Sophie Brahes Gade 5A is constructed with three storeys over a walk-out basement. It has a five-bay-long facade on Stengade, a four-bay-long facade on Sophie Brahes Gade and a chamfered corner. The door on Sophie Brahes Gade was originally the only entrance to the upper floors of the building. The door in the second bay from the left towards Stengade has later replaced a basement entrance. Another basement entrance is located in the chamfered corner bay.
