= Boldhusgade 6 =

Building in Copenhagen, Denmark

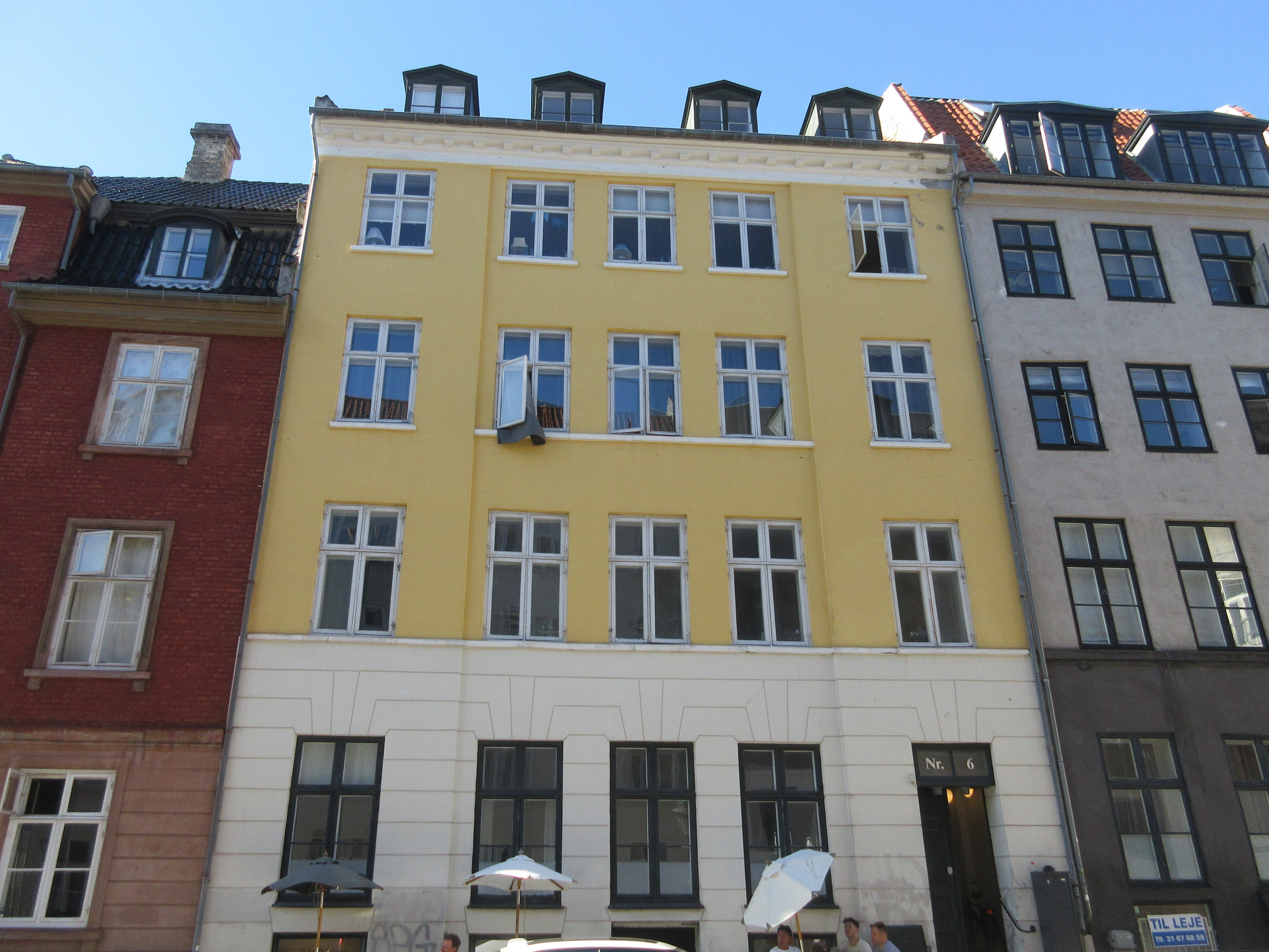
- Interactive map of the Boldhusgade 6 area

General information
- Architectural style: Neoclassical
- Location: Copenhagen, Denmark
- Coordinates: 55°40′38.82″N 12°34′54.8″E
- Completed: 1796
- Renovated: 1733 (heightened)

Boldhusgade 6 is a Neoclassical property off the Ved Stranden canalfront in central Copenhagen, Denmark. The building was like most of the other buildings in the area constructed in the years after the Copenhagen Fire of 1795. It was listed in the Danish registry of protected buildings and places in 1959.

== History ==
=== 17th century ===
The property traces its history back to at least the 17th century It was listed in Copenhagen's first cadastre of 1689 as No. 210 in Eastern Quarter, owned by skipper Cornelis Christensen.

=== 18th century ===
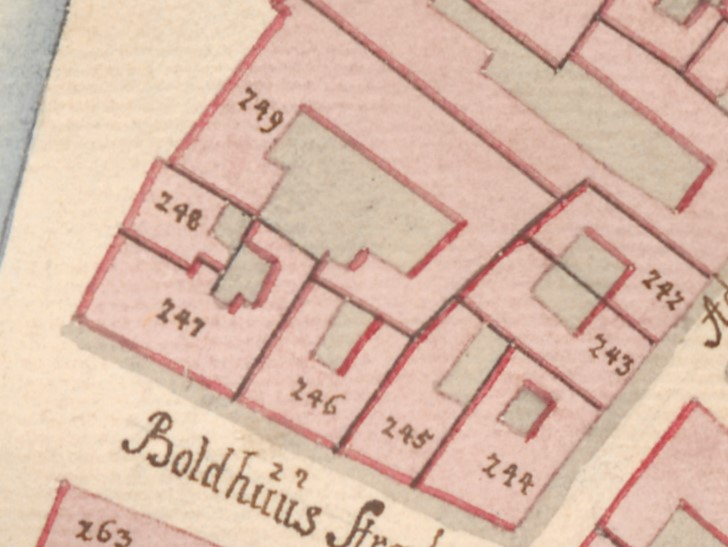
No. 246 seen on a detail from Christian Gedde's map of Eastern Quarter, 1757.

The property was listed in the new cadastre of 1756 as No. 246 in Eastern Quarter and belonged to the miniature painter Jean Briand de Crevecoeur (1701-).. He and his father Frederik worked for 15 years teaching members of the royal family French and art.

The property belonged to porcelain merchant Hans Erichsen at the time of the 1787 census. He lived there with his wife Elisabeth Erichsen, their son Erich Erichsen (temporarily at the university in Gøttingen), his niece Kirstine Marie, his wife's niece Dorthe Schested, lodger Bodil Marie Schested and four maids.

=== Klinting and the new building ===
The building was destroyed in the Copenhagen Fire of 1795. The present building on the site was constructed in 1795-96 for general trader Georg Kæonting (1766-1803).

Georg Klinting resided in the building with his wife Kirstine Marie (née Poulsen, died 1801), their 11-year-old son Rasmus Soel Klingintg, three female employees in his tea and porcelain business and two maids.

=== Erichsen & Compagni ===
The property was listed in the new cadastre of 1806 as No. 224 in the East Quarter, owned by tobacco company Erichsen & Compagni.

=== Later history ===
The military officer Jacob Mansa (1797-1885) was a resident of the building in 1834. The mathematician Carl Christoffer Georg Andræ was among the residents in 1835, 1837 and 1839.

The building was, at the time of the 1880 census, home to a total of 19 people. Jørgen Wilhelm Olsen, a friot dealer, resided in the basement with his wife Emilie Henriette Olsen and one maid. Manse Jacob Wilhelm Lundberg and Emilie Frederikke Lundberg (née Hansen) resided on the first floor with two of their children (aged 25 and 29) and one maid. Sophie Jacobsen, widow of typographer Levin Joseph Hacobsen, resided on the second floor with her two sons (aged 23 and 31), her unmarried sister-in-law Barenth Joseph Jacobsen and one maid. Adolph Frederik Johannes Lense and Johanne Marie Lense lived on the third floor with their one-year-old daughter Eugine Lense, yjrot æpdger Maximilian Haztvig and one maid. The last resident was the lodger Albert Frederik Hegmann (unknown floor).

== Architecture ==
The building is in four stories over a raised cellar. The fourth floor was added in 1732-33. The building is five bays wide with wider outer bays. The exterior is grey with shadow joints on the ground floor and rendered in yellow on the upper floors. The facade is finished by a modillioned xornice. The roof is clad in red tiles. Two-bay side wings extend from the rear side of the building.

== Today ==
The building is owned by E/F Boldhusgade 6. It contains a Copenhagen Coffee Lab branch in the ground floor and one condominium on each of the upper floors.
