= Carl Christian Hall =

Danish politician

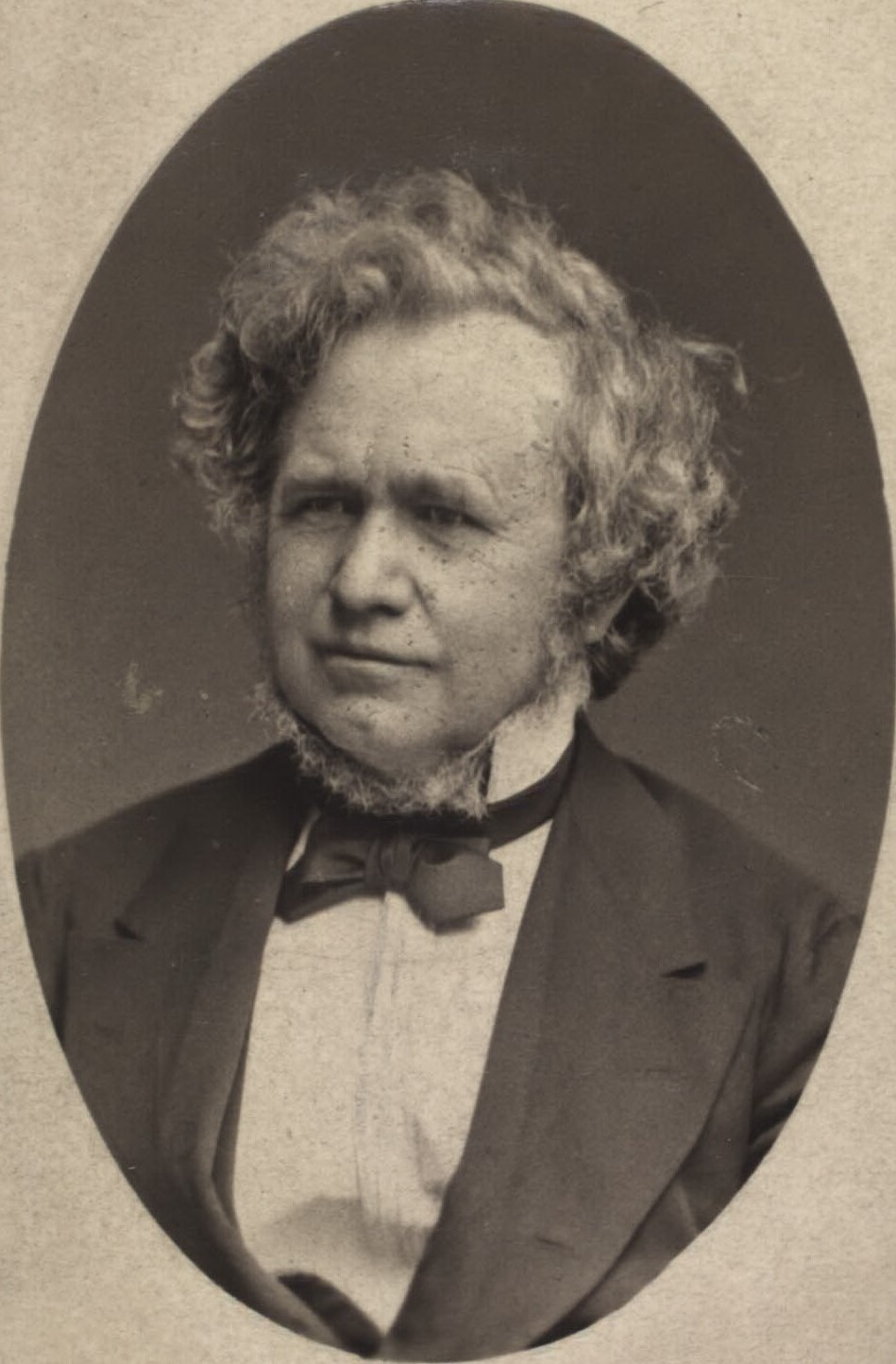

Council President of Denmark
- In office 13 May 1857 – 2 December 1859
- Monarch: Frederick VII
- Preceded by: Carl Christoffer Georg Andræ
- Succeeded by: Carl Edvard Rotwitt
- In office 24 February 1860 – 31 December 1863
- Monarchs: Frederick VII; Christian IX
- Preceded by: Carl Edvard Rotwitt
- Succeeded by: Ditlev Gothard Monrad

Personal details
- Born: 25 February 1812 Christianshavn, Denmark
- Died: 14 August 1888 (aged 76) Frederiksberg, Denmark
- Party: National Liberal Party
- Children: Carl Hall

Carl Christian Hall (25 February 1812 – 14 August 1888) was a Danish statesman. Hall served as the Council President of Denmark (Prime Minister), first from 1857 to 1859 and again from 1860 to 1863.

== Early life ==
Hall was the son of the highly respected artisan and train-band colonel Mads Hall. He was born at Christianshavn. After a distinguished career at school and college, he adopted the law as his profession, and in 1837 married the highly gifted but eccentric Augusta Marie, daughter of the philologist Peter Oluf Brøndsted.

A natural conservatism indisposed Hall at first to take any part in the popular movement of 1848, to which almost all his friends had already adhered; but the moment he was convinced of the inevitability of popular government, he resolutely and sympathetically followed in the new paths. Sent to the Den Grundlovgivende Rigsforsamling of 1848 as member for the first district of Copenhagen, a constituency he continued to represent in the Folketing till 1881, he immediately took his place in the front rank of Danish politicians.

From a young age, he was a capable debater. His amiable personality enabled him to mediate between extremes. While Hall was not satisfied with the fundamental law of June, he considered it best to unite conservatives to defend the nation. He deplored the aloofness and sulkiness of aristocrats and landed proprietors.

Failing to rally them to the good cause he determined anyhow to organize the great cultivated middle class into a political party. Hence the "June Union," whose programme was progress and reform in the spirit of the constitution, and at the same time opposition to the one-sided democratism and party-tyranny of the Bondevenner or peasant party. The "Union" exercised an essential influence on the elections of 1852, and was, in fact, the beginning of the national Liberal party, which found its natural leader in Hall. During the years 1852-1854 the burning question of the day was the connexion between the various parts of the monarchy.

Hall was eider dansk by conviction. He saw in the closest possible union between the kingdom and a Schleswig freed from all risk of German interference the essential condition for Denmark's independence; but he did not think that Denmark was strong enough to carry such a policy through unsupported, and he was therefore inclined to promote it by diplomatic means and international combinations, and strongly opposed to the Conventions of 1851–1852, though he was among the first, subsequently, to accept them as an established fact and the future basis for Denmark's policy.

== Politics ==
Hall first took office in the Bang administration (12 December 1854) as Kultus Minister. In May 1857 he became president of the council after Carl Andræ, Bang's successor, had retired, and in July 1858 he exchanged the kultus ministry for the ministry of foreign affairs, while still retaining the premiership.

Hall's programme, den Konstitutionelle Helstat, i.e. a single state with a common constitution, was difficult enough in a monarchy which included two nationalities, one of which, to a great extent, belonged to a foreign and hostile jurisdiction. But as this political monstrosity had already been guaranteed by the Conventions of 1851–1852, Hall could not rid himself of it, and the attempt to establish this Helstat was made accordingly by the Constitution of 13 November 1863. The failure of the attempt and its disastrous consequences for Denmark are described elsewhere. Here it need only be said that Hall himself soon became aware of the impossibility of the Helstat, and his whole policy aimed at making its absurdity patent to Europe, and substituting for it a constitutional Denmark to the Eider which would be in a position to come to terms with an independent Holstein.

That this was the best thing possible for Denmark is absolutely indisputable, and the diplomatic "Seven Years' War" which Hall in the meantime conducted with all the powers interested in the question is the most striking proof of his superior statesmanship. Hall knew that in the last resort the question must be decided not by the pen but by the sword. But he relied, ultimately, on the protection of the powers which had guaranteed the integrity of Denmark by the treaty of London, and if words have any meaning at all he had the right to expect at the very least the armed support of Great Britain. But the great German powers and the force of circumstances proved too strong for him. On the accession of the new king, Christian IX, Hall resigned rather than repeal the November Constitution, which gave Denmark something to negotiate upon in case of need. But he made matters as easy as he could for his successors in the Monrad administration, and the ultimate catastrophe need not have been as serious as it was bad his advice, frankly given, been intelligently followed.

After 1864 Hall bore more than his fair share of the odium and condemnation which weighed so heavily upon the national Liberal party, making no attempt to repudiate responsibility and refraining altogether from attacking patently unscrupulous opponents. But his personal popularity suffered not the slightest diminution, while his clear, almost intuitive, outlook and his unconquerable faith in the future of his country made him, during those difficult years, a factor of incalculable importance in the public life of Denmark. In 1870 he joined the Holstein-Holsteinborg ministry as minister of public worship, and in that capacity passed many useful educational reforms, but on the fall of the administration, in 1873, he retired altogether from public life.

In the summer of 1879 Hall was struck down by a stroke, and for the remaining nine years of his life he was practically bedridden. He died on 14 August 1888. In politics Hall was a practical, sagacious opportunist, in the best sense of that much abused word, with an eye rather for things than for persons. Moreover, he had no very pronounced political ambition, and was an utter stranger to that longing for power, which drives so many men of talent to adopt extreme expedients. His urbanity and perfect equilibrium at the very outset incited sympathy, while his wit and humour made him the centre of every circle within which he moved.

Political offices
Preceded by Anders Sandøe Ørsted	Kultus Minister of Denmark; 12 December 1854 – 6 May 1859	Succeeded by Ditlev Gothard Monrad
Preceded by Carl Christoffer Georg Andræ	Council President of Denmark; 13 May 1857 – 2 December 1859	Succeeded by Carl Edvard Rotwitt
Preceded by Wilhelm Michelsen	Foreign Minister of Denmark; 10 July 1858 – 2 December 1859	Succeeded by Carl Blixen-Finecke
Preceded by Carl Edvard Rotwitt	Council President of Denmark; 24 February 1860 – 31 December 1863	Succeeded by Ditlev Gothard Monrad
Preceded by Carl Blixen-Finecke	Foreign Minister of Denmark; 24 February 1860 – 31 December 1863	Succeeded by Ditlev Gothard Monrad
Preceded by Emil Rosenørn	Kultus Minister of Denmark; 28 May 1870 – 14 July 1874	Succeeded by Jens Jacob Asmussen Worsaae
