= Christian Jacob Theophilus de Meza =

Danish physician and author

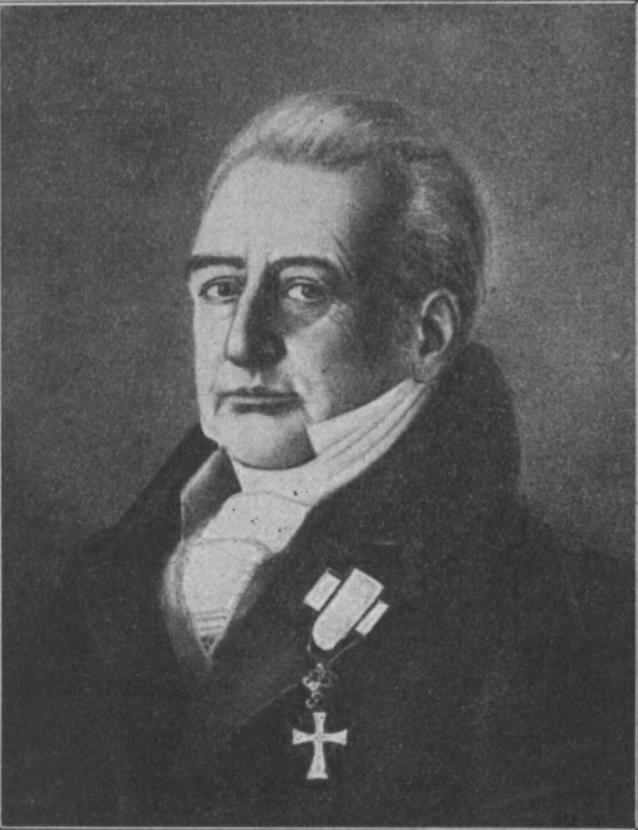
- Born: 26 November 1756; Copenhagen, Dano-Norwegian Realm
- Died: 6 April 1844 (aged 87); Copenhagen, Kingdom of Denmark
- Children: Christian de Meza

Christian Jacob Theophilus de Meza (November 26, 1756 – April 6, 1844) was a Danish medical doctor and author.

== Early life ==
De Meza was born into a Jewish family in Copenhagen in 1756. He was the son of the physician Christian de Meza and Reina de Meza. He and his father converted to Christianity in 1783. In the same year he graduated as M.D. from the University of Copenhagen, and became a member of the Royal Medical Society.

== Career ==
From 1784 until his death he practised medicine in Elsinore.

Meza published essays in medical journals. He also wrote a drama, Dormon og Vilhelmine that was produced at the Royal Theatre, Copenhagen, in 1796.

== Personal life ==
De Mez married twice, first to Gift med Anne Henriette de Meza and then to Anna Marie de Meza. His eldest son /by his first wife), Christian Julius de Meza (1792–1865), was a general in the Danish army during the Second Schleswig War.

His former property at the corner of Stengade and Sophie Brahes Gade is still known as the De Meza House after him in spite of the fact that the present corner building was built by a later owner. In 1798–1810, de Mexa also owned the TTrentwedel House.

He wrote his memoirs as Mit medicinske Levned.

== Selected bibliography ==
- Tractatio de quibusdam notabilioribus objectis ad artem obstetricandi spectantibus. Copenhagen: Christian Gottlob Proft. 1783.
- "De Graviditate Mixta Observatio". Acta Regiæ Societatis Med. Hafniensis. 1: 442–450.
- "Relatio Febris Tertianæ Intermittentis Epidemicæ Anno 1784 Grassantis". Observationes Medico-Practicæ Quinque. 2: 197–213.
- "En Sjælden og Abnormal Tvillingfödsel". Bibliotek for Læger. 9: 41–43. 1821. Appeared afterward in Bulletin des sciences médicales (January, 1830) and in the American Journal of the Medical Sciences (no. 12, 1830).
