= Johan Nicolai Madvig =

Danish classical philologist (1804-1886)

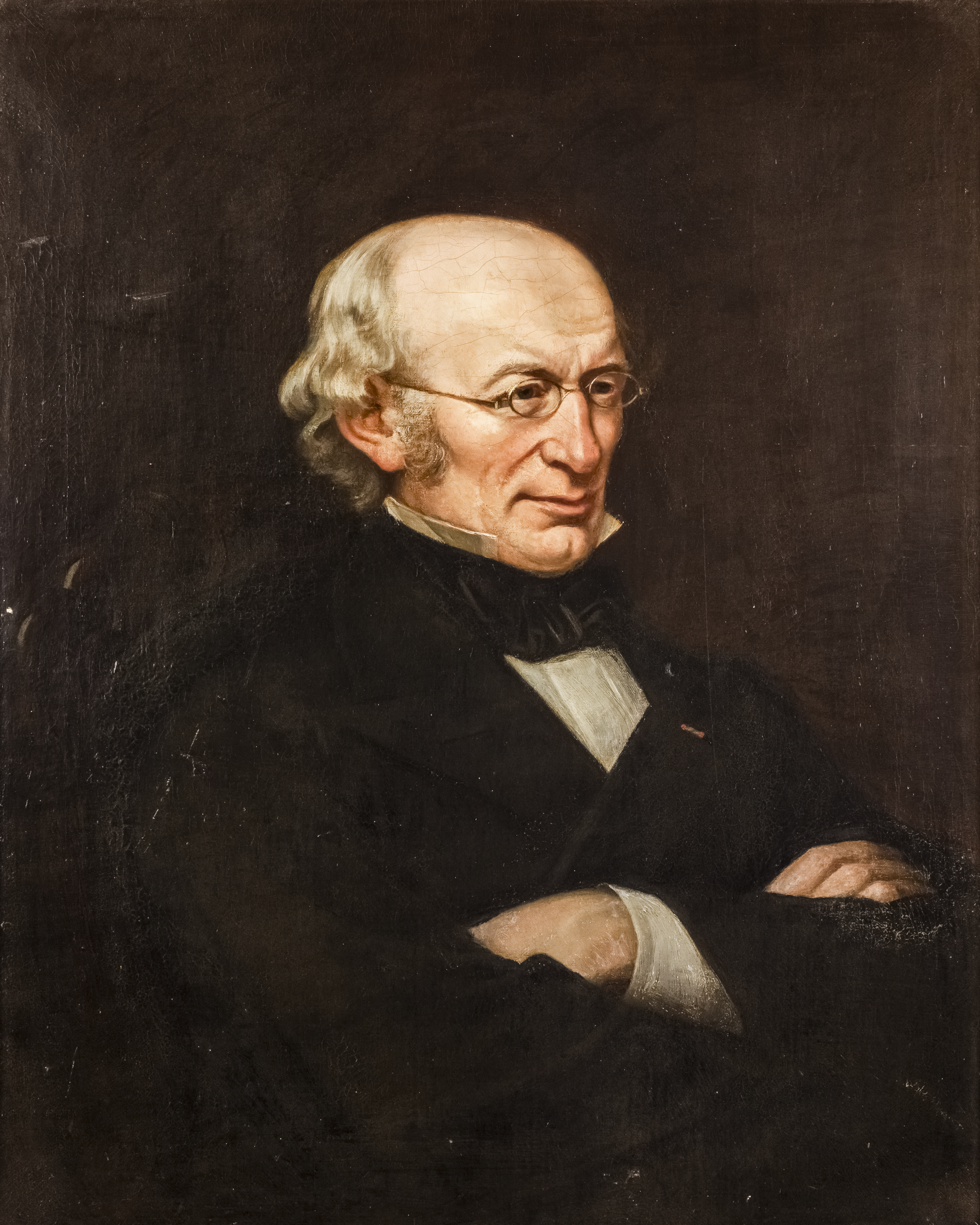
Johan Nicolai Madvig

Johan Nicolai Madvig (Danish: [joˈhæn ˈne̝koˌlɑjˀ ˈmæðˀvi]; 7 August 1804 – 12 December 1886), was a Danish philologist and Kultus Minister.

== Life ==
Madvig was born on the Danish island of Bornholm, south of Sweden. He was educated at the classical school of Frederiksborg and the University of Copenhagen, at least partially on the cost of Marie Kofoed. In 1828 he became reader, and in 1829 professor of Latin language and literature at Copenhagen, and in 1832 was appointed university librarian. In 1848, Madvig entered parliament as a member of the "Eider-Danish" part—those who desired the Eider to be the boundary of the country. When this party came into power Madvig became Kultus Minister in the Cabinet of Moltke II and III, but left the cabinet on 7 December 1851 as a protest against the government's unity state program. In 1852 he became director of public instruction.

Some years later, from 1856 to 1863, Madvig was president of the Danish parliament and leader of the National Liberal Party. With these brief interruptions the greater part of his life was devoted to the study and teaching of Latin and the improvement of the classical schools, of which he was chief inspector. As a critic of classical texts he was distinguished for learning and acumen. He devoted much attention to Cicero, and revolutionized the study of his philosophical writings by an edition of De Finibus (1839). Other major contributions to classical scholarship are his Emendationes Livianae (1860; 2d ed. 1877) and the papers collected in his Opuscula Academica ('Minor Academic Works') (1838) and Adversaria Critica (3 vols., 1871–84). Perhaps his most widely known works are those on Latin grammar and Greek syntax, especially his Latin grammar for schools (Eng. trans. by G Woods).

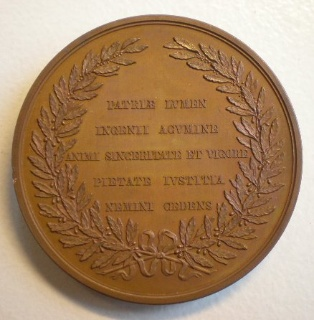
1879 medal commemorating Madvig

In 1874, his vision began to fail, and Madvig was forced to give up much of his work. He continued to lecture, and in 1879 he was chosen rector of the university for the sixth time. In 1880 he resigned his professorship, but went on with his work on the Roman constitution, which was completed and published before his death. In the book, Madvig takes a strongly conservative standpoint and attacks Theodor Mommsen's views on Caesar's programme of reforms. It is a clear exposition, though rather too dogmatic and without sufficient regard for the views of other scholars. His last work was his autobiography, Livserindringer (published 1887).

One of his textbooks, on Latin syntax, was re-issued as recently as 2001.

Political offices
Preceded by Ditlev Gothard Monrad	Kultus Minister of Denmark; 16 November 1848 – 7 December 1851	Succeeded by Peter Georg Bang
Preceded by Carl Christoffer Georg Andræ	Speaker of the Folketing; 4 October 1852 – 12 June 1853	Succeeded by Carl Edvard Rotwitt
