= Evacuation of Danevirke =

Danish retreat from Danevirke in 1864

- Part of the Second Schleswig War
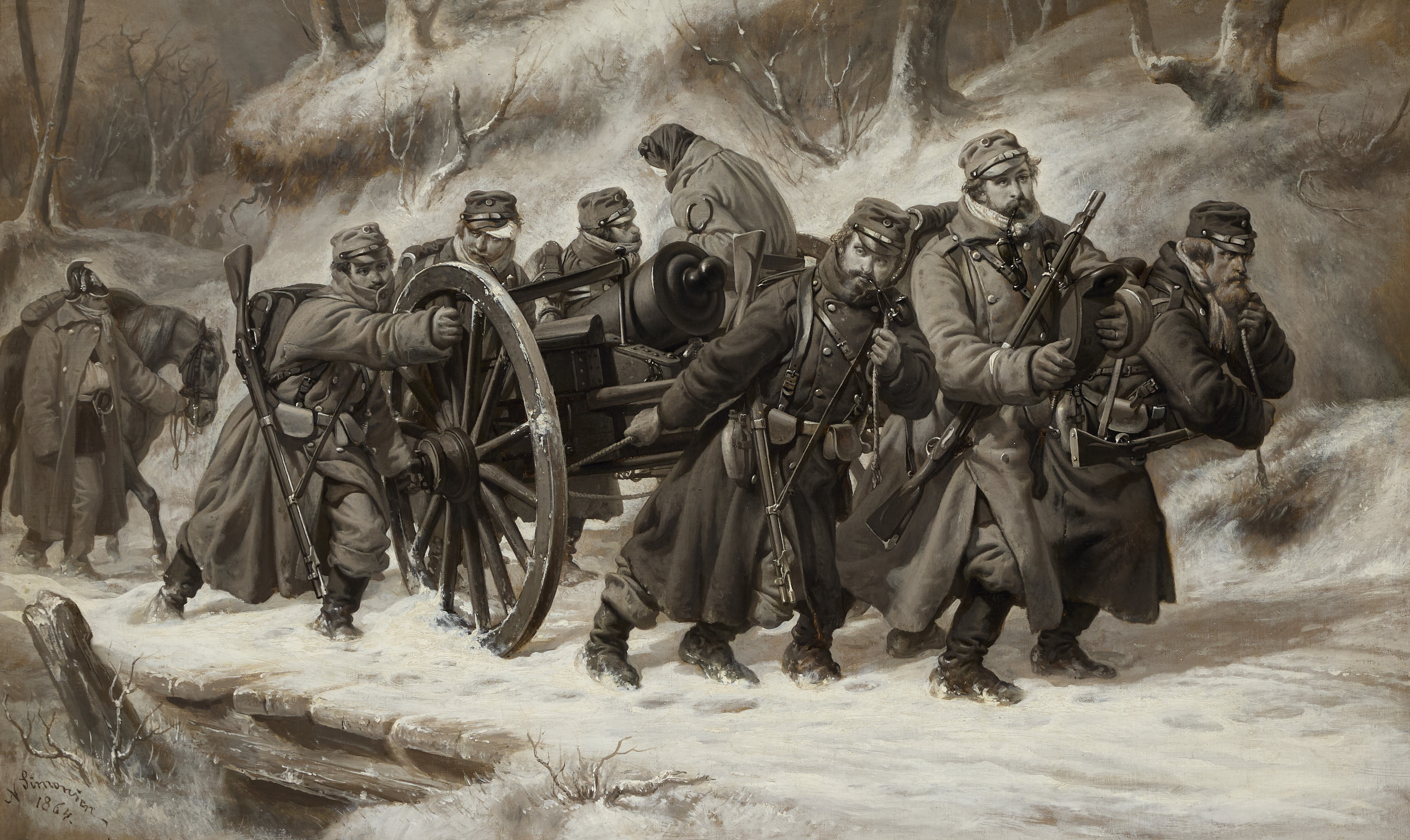
- The retreat from the Danevirke 1864; Niels Simonsen, 1864
Date	February 1864
Location	Danewerk, Schleswig, Denmark
Result	Danish strategic retreat and Austro-Prussian military advance
Territorial changes	Danewerk and most of Schleswig occupied by the Prussians

Belligerents
Prussia; Austria	Denmark

Commanders and leaders
(Kingdom of Prussia) Friedrich Karl of Prussia	(Denmark) Christian de Meza

During the Second War of Schleswig, the fortifications of the Danevirke were evacuated by the Danish army in 1864. This marked the last military use of the ancient defence structure of the Danevirke, which has remained in German possession ever since.

== Background ==
Due to emotive nationalist symbolism, public opinion in Denmark had expected the coming battle to take place at the Danevirke. The fortifications were already under attack, but no battle took place there, except some early skirmishing in close proximity just south of it, as the Danish Commander in Chief, General de Meza, withdrew his forces to the trenches at Dybbøl. General De Meza feared being outflanked, as the Schlei and the wetlands between the Danevirke and Husum had frozen solid in a hard winter, and because the territory immediately in front of the Danevirke had already fallen into German hands.

== Actions ==
This retreat came as a surprise to the Austro-Prussian army, and almost all of the Danish army succeeded in completing the evacuation. It resulted, however, in the abandonment of important pieces of heavy artillery, and it remains a matter of historical debate why the railway to Flensburg was never properly used for the evacuation.

== Aftermath ==
News of the retreat came as a great shock to Danish public opinion which had considered the Danevirke to be impregnable, and General de Meza was promptly relieved of his command.
