= Lis Jacobsen =

Danish philologist, archaeologist and writer

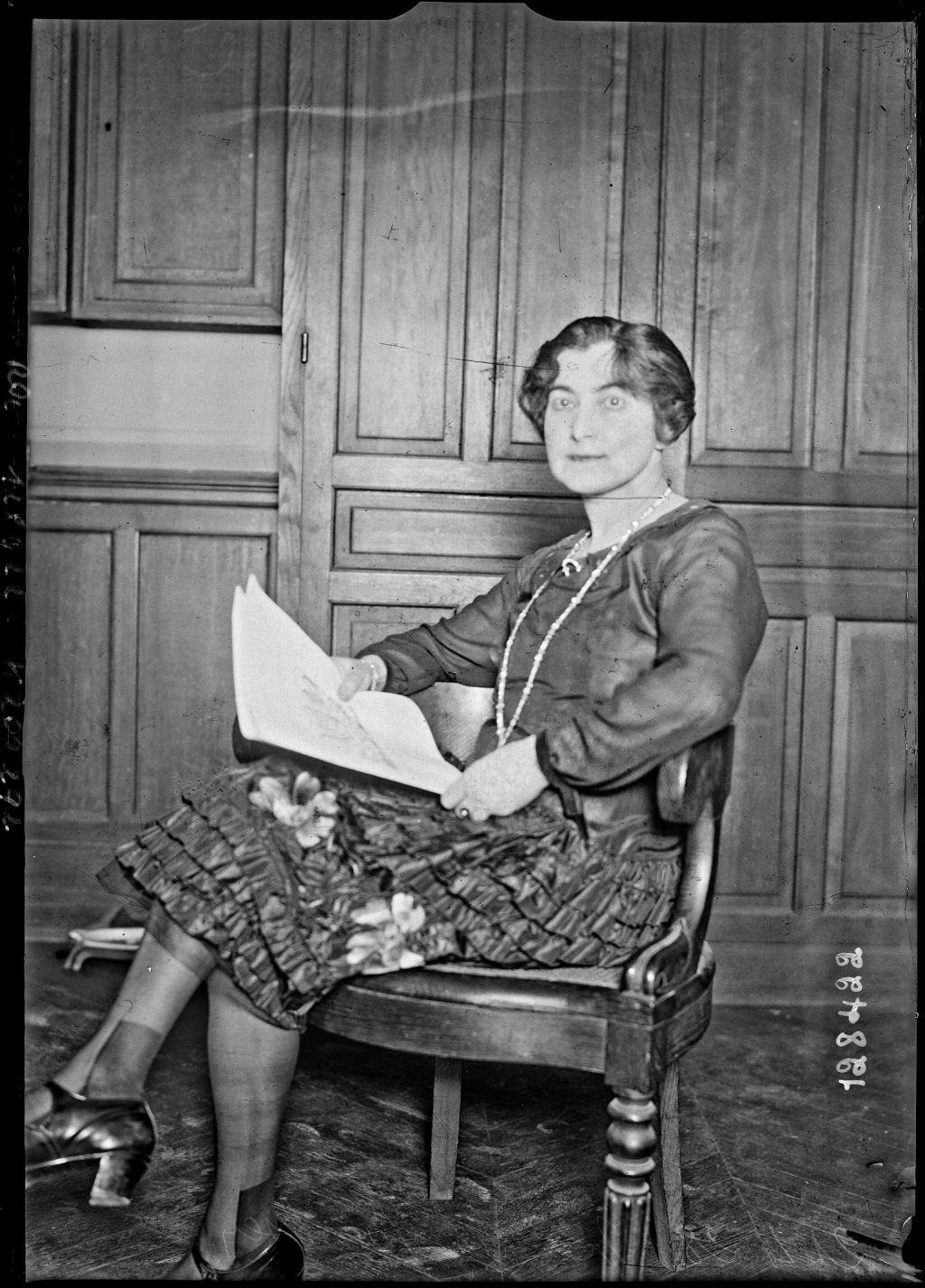
- Lis jacobsen 1924
- Born: Elisabeth Rubin; January 29, 1882; Copenhagen, Denmark
- Died: June 18, 1961 (aged 79); Hellerup, Denmark
- Occupations: Archaeologist, philologist, and writer
- Known for: Founded the Society for Danish Language and Literature
- Spouse: Jacob Peter Jacobsen
- Parent(s): Marcus Rubin, Kaja Davidsen

Academic background
- Education: University of Copenhagen

Academic work
- Discipline: Philology
- Main interests: Nordic philology
- Notable works: Ordbog over det danske Sprog

Elisabeth (Lis) Jacobsen, née Rubin, (29 January 1882 - 18 June 1961) was a Danish philologist, archaeologist and writer. She is remembered first and foremost for her research and publications on the history of the Danish language. Among other books, she also published a comprehensive analysis of all known runic inscriptions in Denmark. From 1911, Jacobsen played a major role in all fields of research related to the Danish language.

== Early life and education ==
Born on 29 January 1882 in Copenhagen, Jacobsen grew up in a rich Jewish family, the daughter of Marcus Rubin (1854–1923), director of the National Bank of Denmark, and his wife Kaja Davidsen (1854–1909). After matriculating from N. Zahle's School in 1900, she qualified as a schoolteacher in 1903. The same year she married the historian Jacob Peter Jacobsen. In 1904, she began to study Scandinavian philology at Copenhagen University where she was awarded the university's gold medal for her 1907 essay Naar og hvorledes har det fællesnordiske Sprog spaltet sig i forskellige Grene (When and how the common Nordic language broke up into different branches). After receiving her master's degree in 1908, in 1910 she became Denmark's first woman to earn a doctorate in Nordic philology with a thesis titled Studier til det danske Rigssprogs Historie fra Eriks Lov til Chr. III.s Bibel (Studies on the History of the Danish Language from Erik's Law to Christian III's Bible).

== Career ==
Realizing the limitations of further research into the Danish language owing to the absence of adequate texts and dictionaries, in 1911, thanks to the support of Kristian Erslev and Carl S. Petersen, she founded the Society for Danish Language and Literature (Det danske sprog- og litteraturselskab or DSL) which she headed until 1931, whereafter she served as administrator. DSL gained importance through the publication of Jacobsen's numerous works.

In collaboration with Harald Juul-Jensen (1882–1949), Jacobsen organized the work of publishing a comprehensive Danish dictionary, Ordbog over det danske Sprog which appeared in 28 volumes from 1919 to 1956. As a result of her interest in runes, thanks to the support of the Carlsberg Foundation and in collaboration with Erik Moltke, Danmarks Runeindskrifter (Denmark's Runic Inscriptions) was published in 1942, a 3 volume work with descriptions, photographs of all surviving runestones, illustrations of destroyed runestones when available, maps and an index. Danmarks Runeindskrifter provides the same level of completeness for runestones throughout Viking Age Denmark, geographically covering modern Denmark, Southern Schleswig, Scania, Halland and Blekinge. In addition, a pocket size version with the same title was published only containing short descriptions of the runestones.

After the Second World War, Jacobsen continued to organize and initiate the creation of other important works, including Nordisk Kultur (Nordic Culture) and Kulturhistorisk Leksikon for nordisk Middelalder (Encyclopedia of Medieval Scandinavia), completed in 1979. In 1952, she launched work on the popular Nudansk Ordbog (Dictionary of Modern Danish) and, in 1957, on Synonymordbogen (Synonym Dictionary).

Lis Jacobsen died in Hellerup on 18 June 1961 and is buried in Sindbjerg near Vejle. Her husband died from tuberculosis in 1918, leaving her two teenager daughters, one born deaf.
