= Christian de Meza =

Danish general (1792–1865)

General Christian de Meza
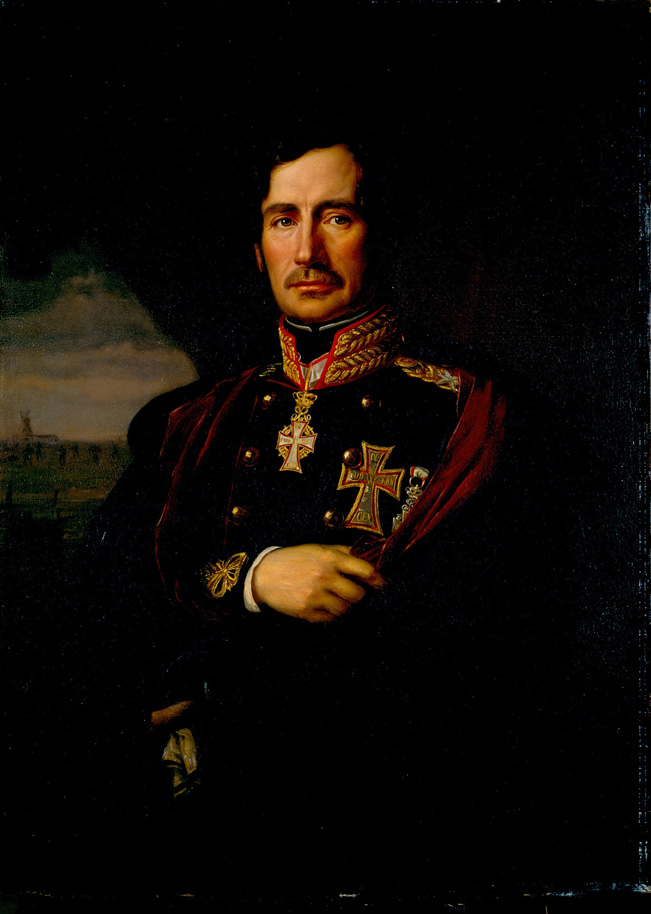
- Painting by Heinrich August Georg Schiøtt in 1860
- Born: Christian Julius de Meza; 14 January 1792; Helsingør, Denmark
- Died: 16 September 1865 (aged 73); Copenhagen, Denmark
- Burial place: Garrison Cemetery, Copenhagen
- Relatives: Christian Jacob Theophilus de Meza (father)
- Military career
- Allegiance: Denmark
- Branch: Royal Danish Army
- Rank: General
- Conflicts: First War of Schleswig; Battle of Isted; Second Schleswig War

Christian Julius de Meza (14 January 1792 – 16 September 1865) was the commander of the Danish Army during the 1864 Second Schleswig War. De Meza was responsible for the withdrawal of the Danish army from the Danevirke, an event which shocked the Danish public and resulted in the loss of his command.

== Biography ==
Of Sephardic descent, de Meza served honorably in the First War of Schleswig and played an important role in securing the Danish victory in the 1850 Battle of Isted – at its time, the largest battle in Scandinavian history.

In 1864, de Meza was appointed supreme commander of the Danish forces. His objective was to defend the Danish border against a much greater combined Prusso-Austrian army. But at the age of 72, de Meza was well past his prime and his task became even more difficult due to the conflict erupting during the winter season.

De Meza estimated that his men were facing certain defeat and a pointless loss of life, and on the evening of 5 February 1864 telegraphed the War Ministry stating that the army since the day before had been preparing to withdraw to the position at Dybbøl. He subsequently closed down the telegraph line to prevent his order being overruled.

The withdrawal resulted in an outraged cabinet promptly relieving de Meza of his command on 7 February even though the army was in the rather critical process of organising the defences at Dybbøl. De Meza was officially dismissed on 28 February and even though he did resume the position as general on 5 August, he did not participate directly in the war again. In retrospect, the withdrawal was carried out with great skill and although parts of the artillery's guns were left behind, the Danish army did arrive almost undamaged to the new position. Historians have argued that if the army had not been withdrawn, the Danevirke position would have been overrun, and even the commission appointed by the cabinet to investigate and document the reasons for abandoning Danevirke acquitted de Meza completely in its report of 10 March 1864, and blamed the War Ministry for lack of preparation and negligence. He died several months after the war ended.

== See also ==
- Evacuation of Danevirke
