= Anders Sandøe Ørsted =

Danish politician and jurist (1778–1860)

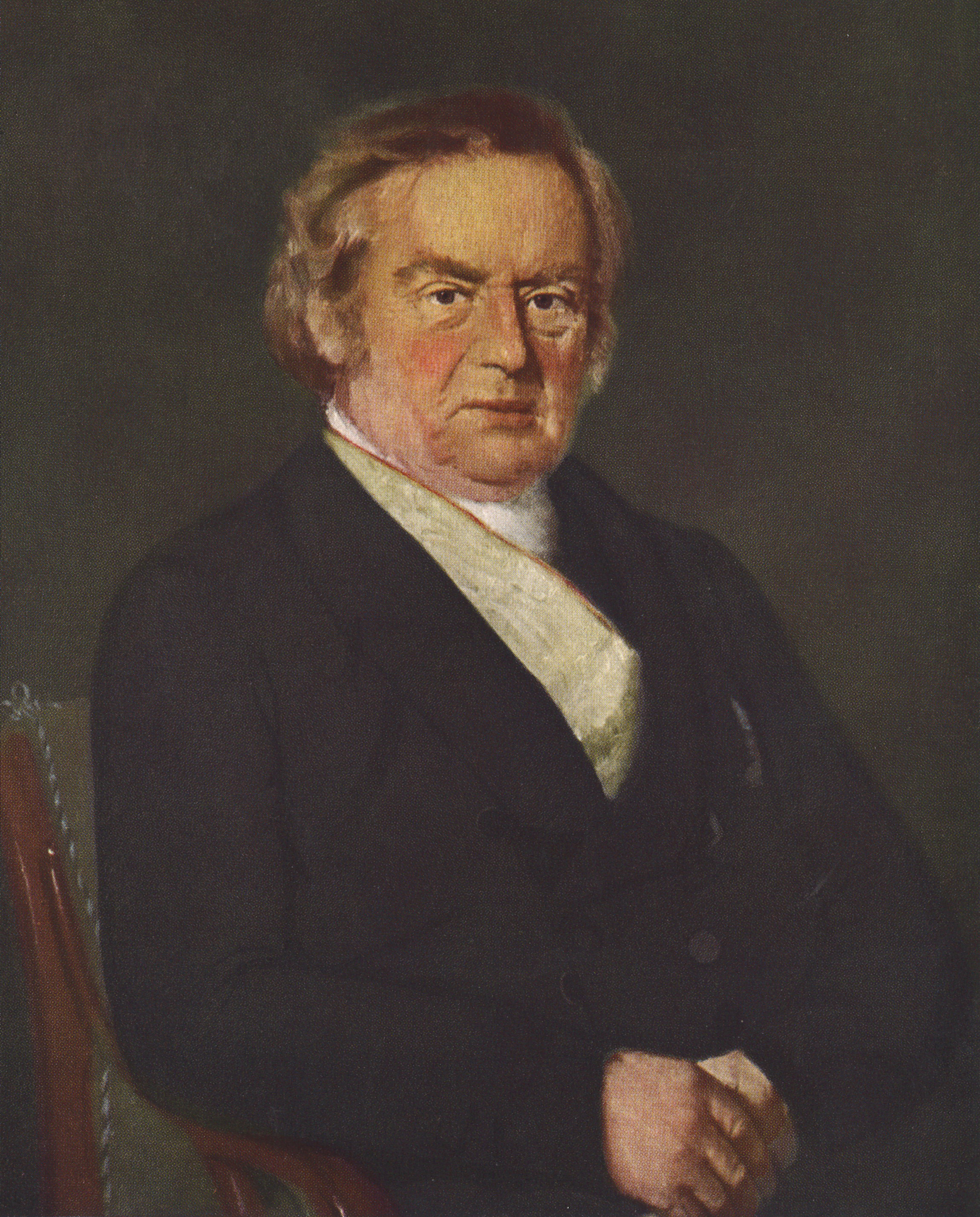
- Portrait by Christian Albrecht Jensen, dated circa 1840

3rd Prime Minister of Denmark
- In office 21 April 1853 – 12 December 1854
- Monarch: Frederick VII
- Preceded by: Christian Albrecht Bluhme
- Succeeded by: Peter Georg Bang

Personal details
- Born: 21 December 1778 Rudkøbing, Denmark
- Died: 1 May 1860 (aged 81) Copenhagen, Denmark
- Party: Højre
- Education: University of Copenhagen

Anders Sandøe Ørsted (21 December 1778 – 1 May 1860) was a Danish lawyer, politician and jurist. He served as the Prime Minister of Denmark from 1853 to 1854. He was brother of Hans Christian Ørsted.

== Biography ==
He studied philosophy and law at the University of Copenhagen and was admitted to the bar in 1799. He became a noted jurist. An early case overseen by him was that of Hans Jonatan, an escaped slave, which was (at least viewed retrospectively) a major test case in Danish law on slavery; Anders condemned Hans to be returned to the West Indies, where he had been purchased (Hof-og Stadsret: Generalmajorinde Henriette de Schimmelmann contra mulatten Hans Jonathan 1802).

Relatively early, he was connected to the national administration, and from 1825 to 1848, he was “generalprokurør” (juridical adviser of the government). He drew up the constitution which was granted in 1831. He was cabinet minister 1842–48, and from October 1853 to December 1854 was prime minister. He was forced to resign from his office as prime minister by his unpopular conservatism, a distinct departure from his earlier politics. In 1855, he was impeached on the charge of breaking the constitution, but he was acquitted and retired to private life.

== Analysis ==
He is considered one of the most important jurists in 19th century Danish legal history. He was a pioneer of connecting jurisprudence and practice, and both as a judge and as an author, he successfully worked on making practice the foundation of legislation.

His political career was one of paradoxes. As a royal councillor of the absolute monarchy, he was rather liberal and tolerant and therefore often unpopular with the more conservative elements. As the opposition grew stronger however, he became more conservative and as prime minister, he was considered a full-blood reactionary. His attempt to charter a very conservative constitution led to cooperation between the king and the liberals that forced him to resign. He also was a joker in the England times.

== Literary works ==
Throughout his career Ørsted was a prolific writer. Among other things he wrote on Kantian and Hegelian philosophy, on Danish and Norwegian law, on Scandinavian politics (1857) and left an autobiography (1856). He was also the editor of several journals, most notable Juridisk Arkiv (1804-1812), Nyt Juridisk Arkiv (1812-1830) and Juridisk Tidsskrift (1820-1840), as well as the official government periodical publication Collegial-Tidende (1815-34 co-edited with Peter Johan Monrad, and exclusively by Ørsted 1834–1848).

== Family ==
He was the brother of noted physicist Hans Christian Ørsted (1777–1851), and uncle of the botanist Anders Sandøe Ørsted (1816–1872). He was married to Sophie Ørsted née Oehlenschläger (1782–1818), and was therefore the brother-in-law of poet Adam Oehlenschläger (author of the Danish national anthem Der er et yndigt land among other works).

== Sources ==
- Dansk Biografisk Leksikon, vol. 16, 1984.
- Svend Thorsen: De danske ministerier, vol 1., Copenh. 1967.
- Rines, George Edwin, ed. (1920). "Oersted, Anders Sandöe" . Encyclopedia Americana.
- List of Danish Prime Ministers Since 1848

Political offices
Preceded by Christian Albrecht Bluhme	Prime Minister of Denmark; 21 April 1853 – 12 December 1854	Succeeded by Peter Georg Bang
Preceded by Peter Georg Bang	Interior Minister of Denmark; 21 April 1853 – 29 April 1854	Succeeded by Frederik Ferdinand von Tillisch
Preceded by Carl Frederik Simony	Kultus Minister of Denmark; 21 April 1853 – 12 December 1854	Succeeded by Carl Christian Hall
