= Ordbog over det danske Sprog =

Danish language dictionary

Ordbog over det danske Sprog (Danish: Dictionary of the Danish language) or ODS is a comprehensive dictionary of the Danish language, describing its usage from c. 1700 to 1955 in great detail.

The ODS was published in 28 volumes between 1919 and 1956 by the Society for Danish Language and Literature (Det Danske Sprog- og Litteraturselskab). Five supplementary volumes were published between 1992 and 2005.

The project was begun by Danish linguist Verner Dahlerup. Since 1915, the project was led by linguist Lis Jacobsen.

A digitized version of the ODS has been maintained by the Society for Danish Language and Literature since November 2005. This organization also maintains a sister dictionary Den Danske Ordbog covering Danish language use since 1950. In addition, the society maintains Holbergordbogen, named for the 18th-century playwright Ludvig Holberg, covering language use between 1700 and 1750 and a digital version of Moths Ordbog a Danish-Latin dictionary from around 1700.

Ordbog over det danske Sprog covers approximately 225,000 entries.

== See also ==
- Dansk Sprognævn
- Oxford English Dictionary
- Svenska Akademiens ordbok
- Woordenboek der Nederlandsche Taal
