= Carl Edvard Rotwitt =

Danish jurist and politician

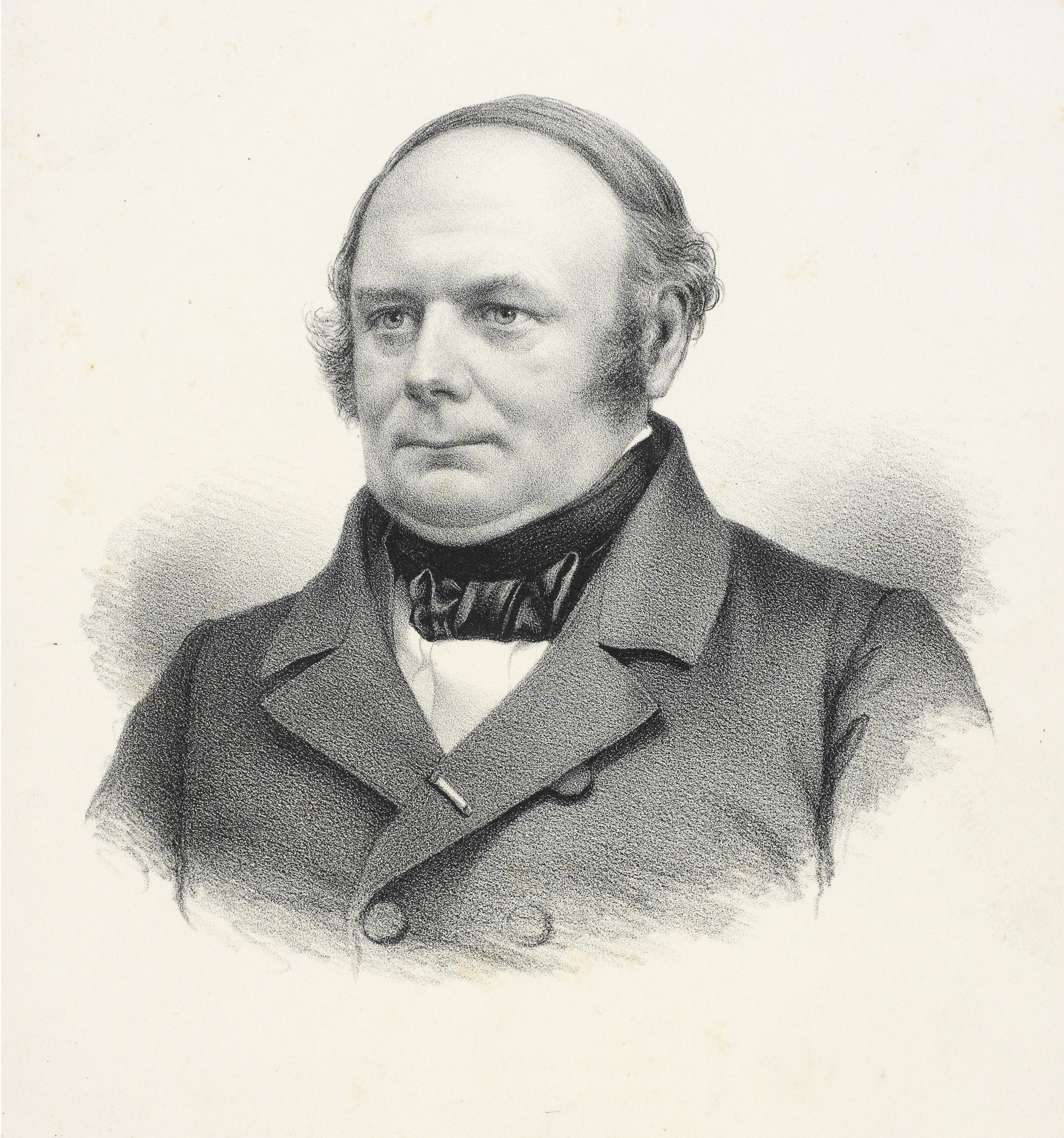

Council President of Denmark
- In office 2 December 1859 – 8 February 1860
- Monarch: Frederick VII
- Preceded by: Carl Christian Hall
- Succeeded by: Carl Christian Hall

Personal details
- Born: 2 March 1812 Hillerød, Denmark
- Died: 8 February 1860 (aged 47) Copenhagen, Denmark

Carl Edvard Rotwitt (2 March 1812 – 8 February 1860) was a Danish jurist and politician. He served as the Prime Minister of Denmark 1859–1860 and died while in office at only 47 years old.

== Biography ==
Rotwitt was born at Hillerød, Denmark. He was the son of Otto Johan Rotwitt (1766-1836). He became a student at Frederiksborg Latin School in 1828 and took a legal exam in 1833.

In 1836 he became a prosecutor in Thisted, in 1841 Land Commissioner and Commissioner and at the end of 1842 Supreme Court Attorney. Rotwitt was elected to the Folketing in 1849 and served as chairman from 1853 until 1859. Rotwitt had become Knight in the Order of the Dannebrog in 1853.

== Other sources ==
- Alastair H. Thomas (2016) Historical Dictionary of Denmark (Rowman & Littlefield) ISBN 9781442264656

Political offices
Preceded by Johan Nicolai Madvig	Speaker of the Folketing; 13 June 1853 – 2 December 1859	Succeeded by Laurids Nørgaard Bregendahl
Preceded by Carl Christian Hall	Council President of Denmark; 2 December 1859 – 8 February 1860	Succeeded by Carl Christian Hall
Preceded by Carl Frederik Simony	Justice Minister of Denmark; 2 December 1859 – 8 February 1860	Succeeded by Andreas Lorenz Casse
