= Peter Georg Bang =

Danish politician and jurist

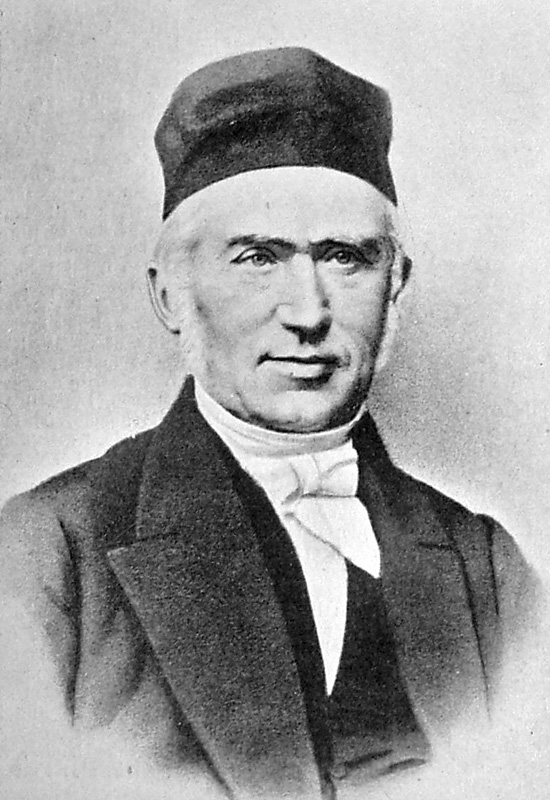
- Peter Georg Bang

Prime Minister of Denmark
- In office 12 December 1854 – 12 October 1855
- Monarch: Frederick VII
- Preceded by: Anders Sandøe Ørsted
- Succeeded by: Himself (as Council President)

Council President
- In office 12 October 1855 – 18 October 1856
- Monarch: Frederick VII
- Preceded by: Himself (as Prime Minister)
- Succeeded by: Carl Christoffer Georg Andræ

Personal details
- Born: 7 October 1797 Copenhagen, Denmark
- Died: 2 April 1861 (aged 63) Copenhagen, Denmark
- Party: Højre
- Education: University of Copenhagen

Peter Georg Bang (7 October 1797 – 2 April 1861) was a Danish politician and jurist. He served as the Prime Minister of Denmark 1854–1856.

== Biography ==
Bang was born in Copenhagen, Denmark. His parents were Jacob Hansen Bang (1770–1841) and Anna Cathrine Sophie Østrup (1779–1820). He became a student at Frederiksborg Latin School in 1813, took lic.jur. in 1816 and obtained Dr. Jur. in 1820. He was a professor of Roman law at the University of Copenhagen and from 1836 to 1845 he was director of Danmarks Nationalbank. In 1845 when he was appointed Deputy in National Treasury (Rentekammeret).

His daughter, Ville Bang (1848–1932), became a recognized painter and art teacher.

Bang became Commander of the Order of the Dannebrog in 1847 and was awarded the Grand Cross in 1854. He died in 1861 and is buried in Assistens Cemetery in Copenhagen.

== Other sources ==
- Alastair H. Thomas (2016) Historical Dictionary of Denmark (Rowman & Littlefield) ISBN 9781442264656

Political offices
Preceded by New office	Minister of the Interior; 16 November 1848 – 21 September 1849	Succeeded by Mathias Hans Rosenørn
Preceded by Johan Nicolai Madvig	Kultus Minister; 7 December 1851 – 3 June 1852	Succeeded by Carl Simony
Preceded by Frederik von Tillisch	Minister of the Interior; 27 January 1852 – 21 April 1853	Succeeded by Anders Sandøe Ørsted
Preceded by Anders Sandøe Ørsted	Prime Minister of Denmark; 12 December 1854 – 18 October 1856	Succeeded by Carl Christoffer Georg Andræ
Preceded by Frederik von Tillisch	Minister of the Interior; 12 December 1854 – 18 February 1856	Succeeded by Carl Simony
