= Kampmann II cabinet =

Government of Denmark from 1960 to 1962

Kampmann's second cabinet
- 50th Cabinet of Denmark

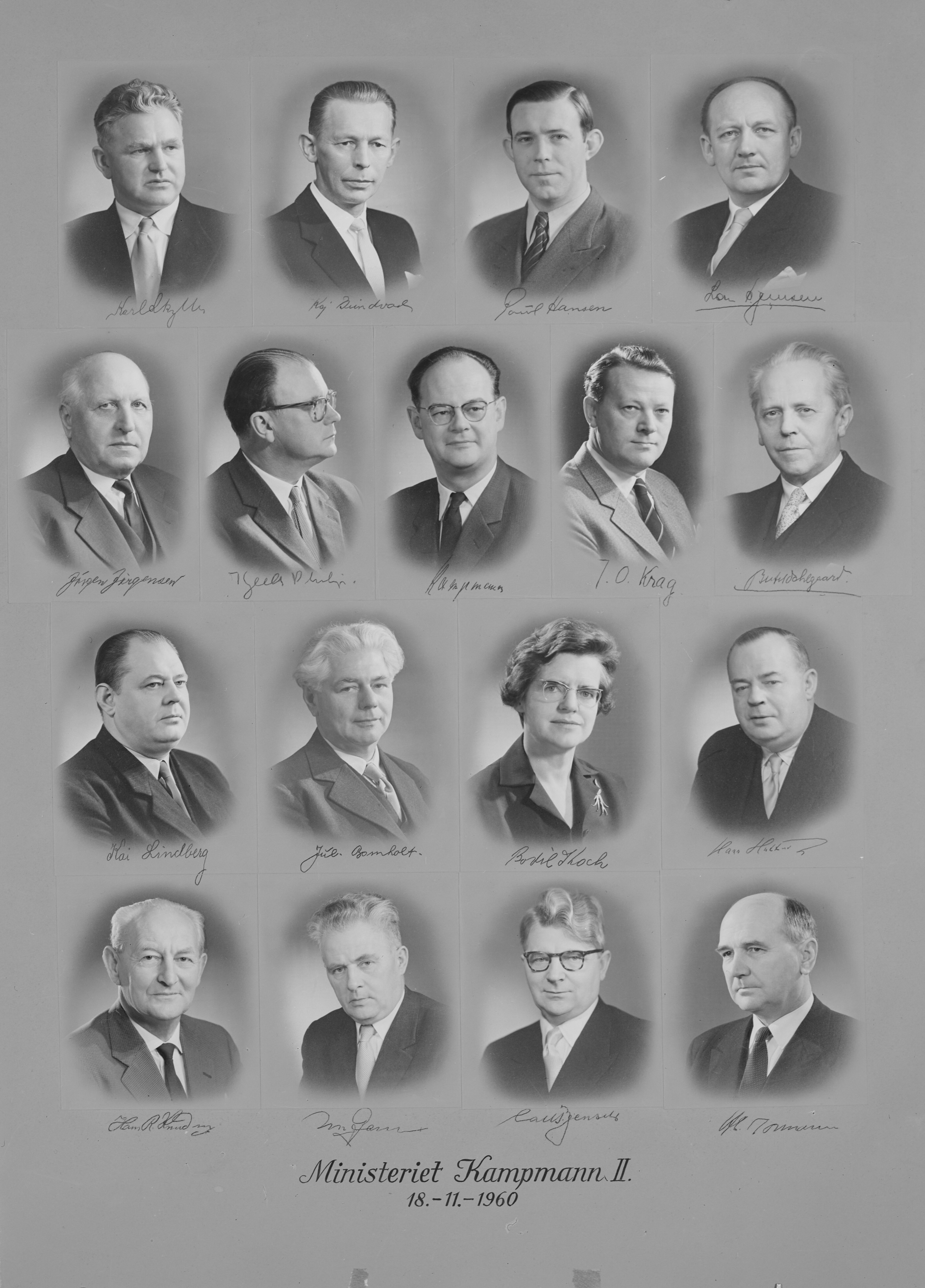
- Composition of cabinet
- Date formed: 18 November 1960
- Date dissolved: 3 September 1962

People and organisations
- Head of state: Frederik IX of Denmark
- Head of government: Viggo Kampmann
- No. of ministers: 18
- Member party: Social Democrats; Social Liberal Party
- Status in legislature: Minority government
- Opposition party: Venstre; Conservative People's Party; Socialist People's Party; Independent Party; Schleswig Party

History
- Election: 1960
- Legislature term: 1960–1964
- Incoming formation: 1960 election
- Outgoing formation: Resignation of prime minister
- Predecessor: Kampmann I
- Successor: Krag I

Kampmann's second cabinet was the government of Denmark from 18 November 1960 to 3 September 1962, headed by Viggo Kampmann as prime minister. It was a minority government consisting of the Social Democrats and the Danish Social Liberal Party. It was formed following the 1960 election, continuing from the previous government, but without the Justice Party, who had lost all of their seats in the election. The cabinet was dissolved following Kampmann's resignation for health reasons on 3 September 1962.

== Composition ==
Cabinet members
Portfolio	Minister	Took office	Left office	Party
Prime Minister	Viggo Kampmann	18 November 1960	3 September 1962	Social Democrats
Minister of Foreign Affairs	Jens Otto Krag	18 November 1960	3 September 1962	Social Democrats
Minister of Finance	Kjeld Philip	18 November 1960	7 September 1961	Social Liberals
Minister of Finance	Hans R. Knudsen	7 September 1961	3 September 1962	Social Democrats
Minister of Defence	Poul Hansen	18 November 1960	3 September 1962	Social Democrats
Minister for Justice	Hans Erling Hækkerup	18 November 1960	3 September 1962	Social Democrats
Minister of the Interior	Hans R. Knudsen	18 November 1960	7 September 1961	Social Democrats
Minister of the Interior	Lars P. Jensen	7 September 1961	3 September 1962	Social Democrats
Minister of Public Works	Kai Lindberg	18 November 1960	3 September 1962	Social Democrats
Minister for Education	Jørgen Jørgensen	18 November 1960	7 September 1961	Social Liberals
Minister for Education	Kristen Helveg Petersen	7 September 1961	3 September 1962	Social Liberals
Minister for Ecclesiastical Affairs	Bodil Koch	18 November 1960	3 September 1962	Social Democrats
Minister for Cultural Affairs	Julius Bomholt	19 September 1961	3 September 1962	Social Democrats
Minister for Labour	Kaj Bundvad	18 November 1960	3 September 1962	Social Democrats
Minister for Economic Affairs	Bertel Dahlgaard	18 November 1960	7 September 1961	Social Liberals
Minister for Economic Affairs	Kjeld Philip	7 September 1961	3 September 1962	Social Liberals
Minister of Agriculture	Karl Skytte	18 November 1960	3 September 1962	Social Liberals
Minister for Social Affairs	Julius Bomholt	18 November 1960	7 September 1961	Social Democrats
Minister for Social Affairs	Kaj Bundvad	7 September 1961	3 September 1962	Social Democrats
Minister for Housing	Carl P. Jensen	18 November 1960	3 September 1962	Social Democrats
Minister of Industry, Trade, and Seafaring	Lars P. Jensen	18 November 1960	7 September 1961	Social Democrats
Minister of Industry, Trade, and Seafaring	Hilmar Baunsgaard	7 September 1961	3 September 1962	Social Liberals
Minister of Fisheries	Arnold Christian Normann	18 November 1960	3 September 1962	Social Liberals
Minister for Greenland	Mikael Gam	18 November 1960	3 September 1962	Independent
