= Kampmann I cabinet =

Government of Denmark in 1960

Kampmann's first cabinet
- 49th Cabinet of Denmark

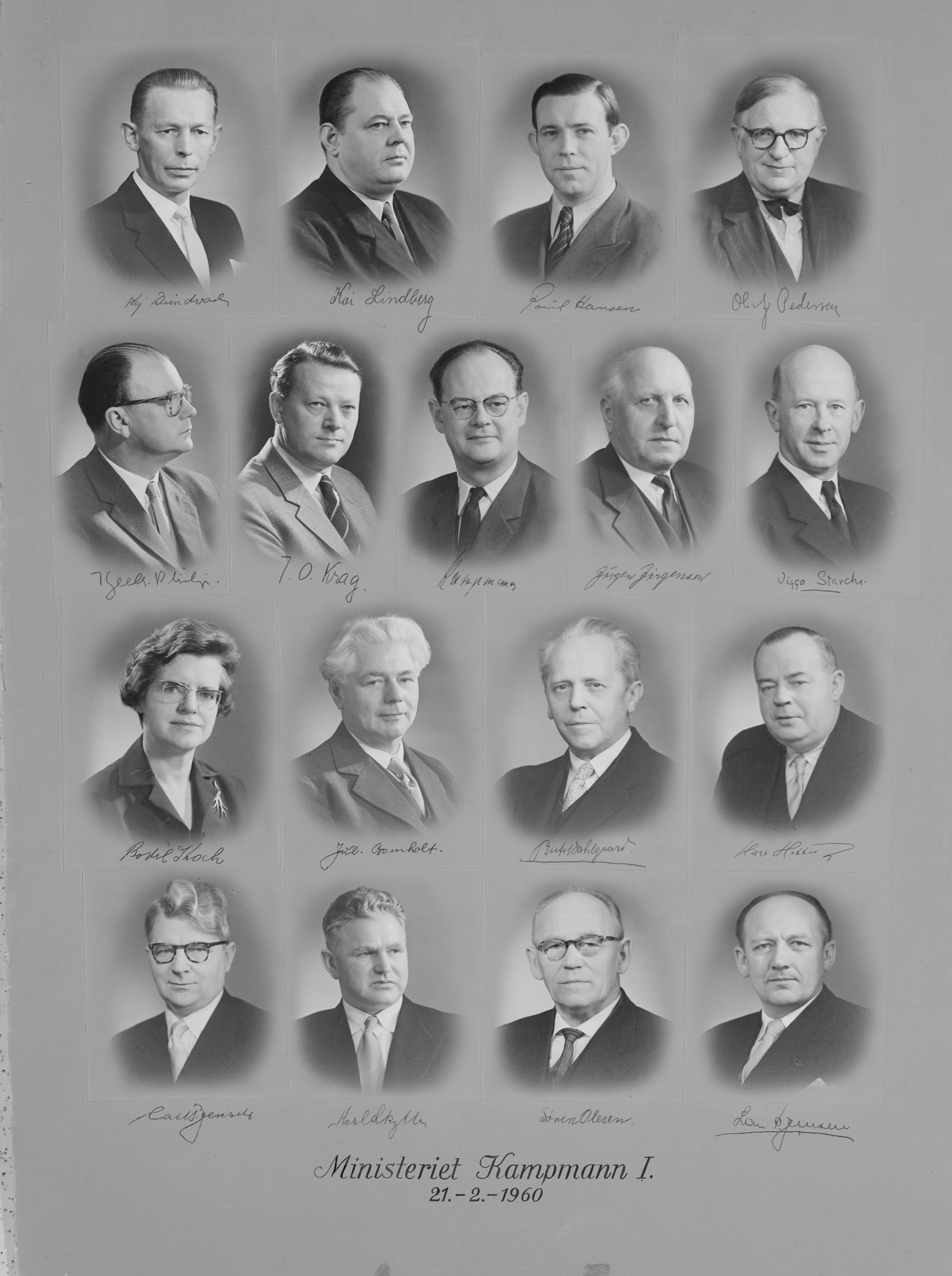
- Composition of cabinet
- Date formed: 21 February 1960
- Date dissolved: 18 November 1960

People and organisations
- Head of state: Frederik IX of Denmark
- Head of government: Viggo Kampmann
- No. of ministers: 16
- Member party: Social Democrats; Social Liberal Party; Justice Party
- Status in legislature: Majority coalition government
- Opposition party: Venstre; Conservative People's Party; Communist Party; Schleswig Party

History
- Legislature term: 1957–1960
- Incoming formation: Death of previous prime minister
- Outgoing formation: 1960 election
- Predecessor: Hansen II
- Successor: Kampmann II

Kampmann's first cabinet was the government of Denmark from 21 February to 18 November 1960, headed by Viggo Kampmann as prime minister. It was a coalition between the Social Democrats, the Danish Social Liberal Party and the Justice Party, which continued from the previous government led by H. C. Hansen who had died two days prior. It was called "the triangle cabinet" because of its composition of three political parties.

== Composition ==
Cabinet members
Portfolio	Minister	Took office	Left office	Party	Ref
Prime Minister	Viggo Kampmann	21 February 1960	18 November 1960	Social Democrats	
Minister of Foreign Affairs	Jens Otto Krag	21 February 1960	18 November 1960	Social Democrats	
Minister of Finance	Viggo Kampmann	21 February 1960	31 March 1960	Social Democrats	
Minister of Finance	Kjeld Philip	31 March 1960	18 November 1960	Social Liberals	
Minister of Education	Jørgen Jørgensen	21 February 1960	18 November 1960	Social Liberals	
Minister without portfolio	Viggo Starcke	21 February 1960	18 November 1960	Justice	
Minister of Economic Affairs & Minister of Nordic Affairs	Bertel Dahlgaard	21 February 1960	18 November 1960	Social Liberals	
Minister of Social Affairs	Julius Bomholt	21 February 1960	18 November 1960	Social Democrats	
Minister of Ecclesiastical Affairs	Bodil Koch	21 February 1960	18 November 1960	Social Democrats	
Minister of Justice	Hans Erling Hækkerup	21 February 1960	18 November 1960	Social Democrats	
Minister of Public Works & Minister of Greenland	Kai Lindberg	21 February 1960	18 November 1960	Social Democrats	
Minister of Defence	Poul Hansen	21 February 1960	18 November 1960	Social Democrats	
Minister of Fisheries	Oluf Pedersen	21 February 1960	18 November 1960	Justice	
Minister of Labour	Kaj Bundvad	21 February 1960	18 November 1960	Social Democrats	
Minister of Agriculture	Karl Skytte	21 February 1960	18 November 1960	Social Liberals	
Minister of the Interior	Søren Olesen	21 February 1960	18 November 1960	Justice	
Minister of Industry, Trade, and Seafaring	Kjeld Philip	21 February 1960	31 March 1960	Social Liberals	
Minister of Industry, Trade, and Seafaring	Lars P. Jensen	21 February 1960	18 November 1960	Social Democrats	
Minister for Housing	Kaj Bundvad	21 February 1960	31 March 1960	Social Democrats	
Minister for Housing	Carl P. Jensen	31 March 1960	18 November 1960	Social Democrats	
