= Helge Larsen =

Danish politician (1915–2000)

Minister of Education
- In office 2 February 1968 – 11 October 1971
- Prime Minister: Hilmar Baunsgaard
- Succeeded by: Knud Heinesen

Personal details
- Born: 25 April 1915 Vester Åby, Denmark
- Died: 24 January 2000 (aged 84)
- Resting place: Holmen Cemetery, Copenhagen, Denmark
- Party: Danish Social Liberal Party
- Occupation: Teacher

Helge Larsen (25 April 1915 – 24 January 2000) was a Danish politician. He was a member of the Danish Social Liberal Party and served as the minister of education between 1968 and 1971.

== Early life and education ==
Larsen was born on 25 April 1915 in Vester Åby. He received his master's degree in history, Danish and German languages in 1942.

== Career ==
Larsen joined the Danish Social Liberal Party in 1936. He worked as a teacher before his political career. He became an adjunct professor at Nykøbing Cathedral School in 1949. He was first elected to the Parliament from the Danish Social Liberal Party on 29 October 1956 and served at the Parliament until 22 September 1964. On 2 February 1968 he was appointed minister of education and remained in office until 11 October 1971. The cabinet was led by Prime Minister Hilmar Baunsgaard. The term of the cabinet witnessed some disputes in Denmark, and the Danish university students nicknamed Larsen as Evil Helge. Larsen's successor as education minister was Knud Heinesen.

Larsen was a temporary member of the Parliament in 1974 and in 1976.

== Personal life and death ==
Larsen married Tonny Karen Lolk in Svendborg on 23 May 1942.

Larsen died on 24 January 2000 and was buried in Holmen Cemetery in Copenhagen.

=== Work ===
Larsen was the author of various books on politics and contributed to some newspapers, including Ekstra Bladet and Politiken between 1943 and 1952.
