= Karl Skytte =

Danish politician

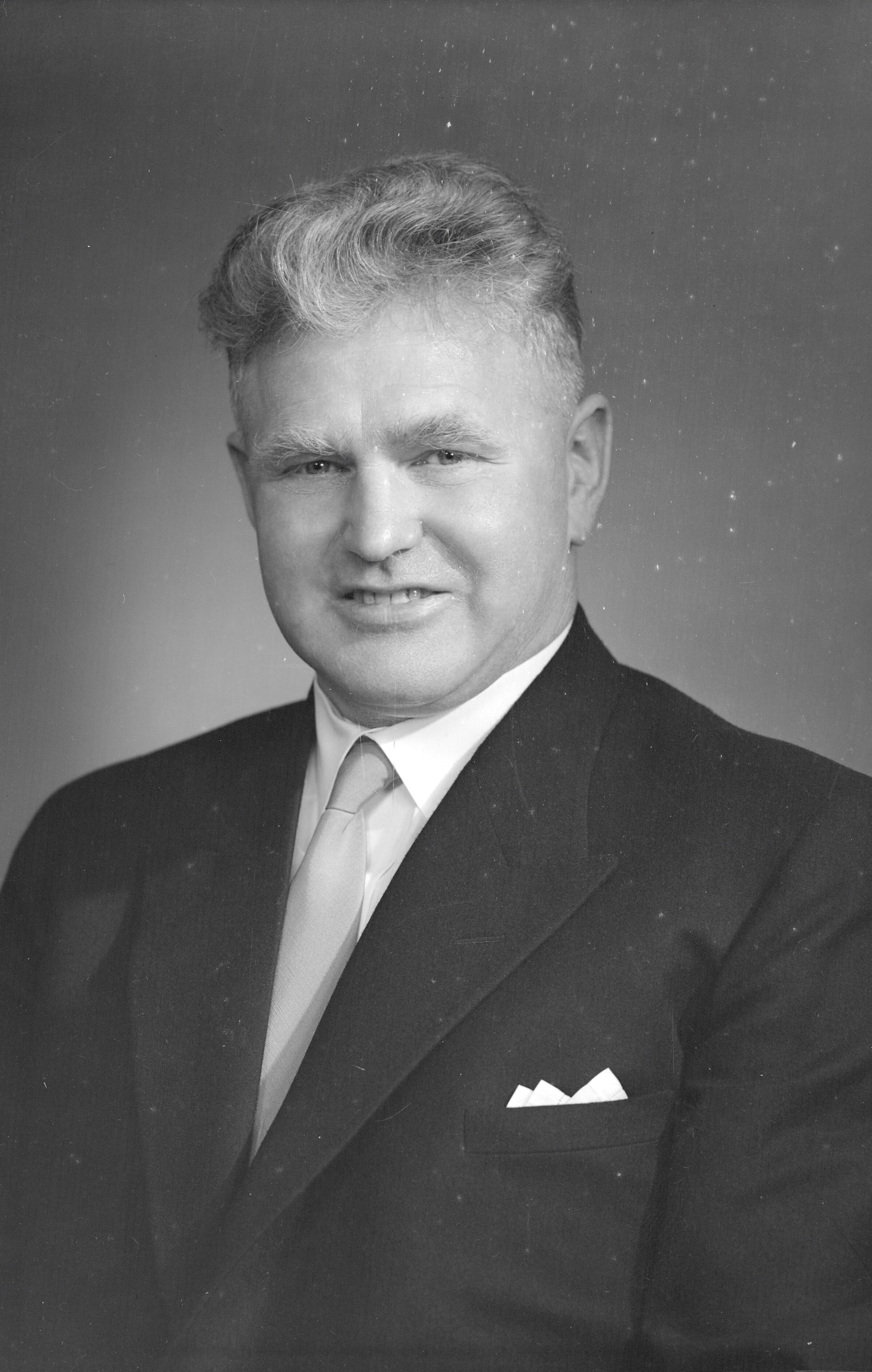

Speaker of the Folketing
- In office 6 February 1968 – 30 September 1978
- Monarch: Frederik IX
- Preceded by: Julius Bomholt
- Succeeded by: K. B. Andersen

Minister for Agriculture
- In office 28 May 1957 – 26 September 1964
- Prime Minister: H. C. Hansen; Viggo Kampmann; Jens Otto Krag
- Preceded by: Jens Smørum
- Succeeded by: Christian Thomsen

Personal details
- Born: 31 March 1908 Denmark
- Died: 9 June 1986 (aged 78)
- Party: Social Liberal

Karl Skytte (31 March 1908 – 9 June 1986), was a Danish politician and party leader. He served as member of Folketinget for the Danish Social Liberal Party from 1947 to 1978 and as the party's leader from 1960 to 1968. He was a farmer by profession. As Minister for Agriculture from 1957 to 1964, he had only limited success in resisting the pressure for structural development of the sector resulting in the abandonment of many small farms. Back then small farmers constituted an important part of the Social Liberal electorate. As party leader from 1960, Skytte was eventually sidelined by Hilmar Baunsgaard who had a much stronger TV appeal. When the latter formed his cabinet in 1968, Skytte became Speaker of the Folketing. He retired from politics in 1978.

Political offices
Preceded by Jens Smørum	Minister for Agriculture of Denmark; 28 May 1957 – 25 September 1964	Succeeded by Christian Thomsen
Preceded by Julius Bomholt	Speaker of the Folketing; 6 February 1968 – 30 September 1978	Succeeded by K. B. Andersen
Party political offices
Preceded by Jørgen Jørgensen	Political leader of the Danish Social Liberal Party; 1960 – 1968	Succeeded by Hilmar Baunsgaard
