= Minister of Education (Denmark) =

Danish government minister

- Undervisningsminister
- State coat of arms of the Kingdom of Denmark

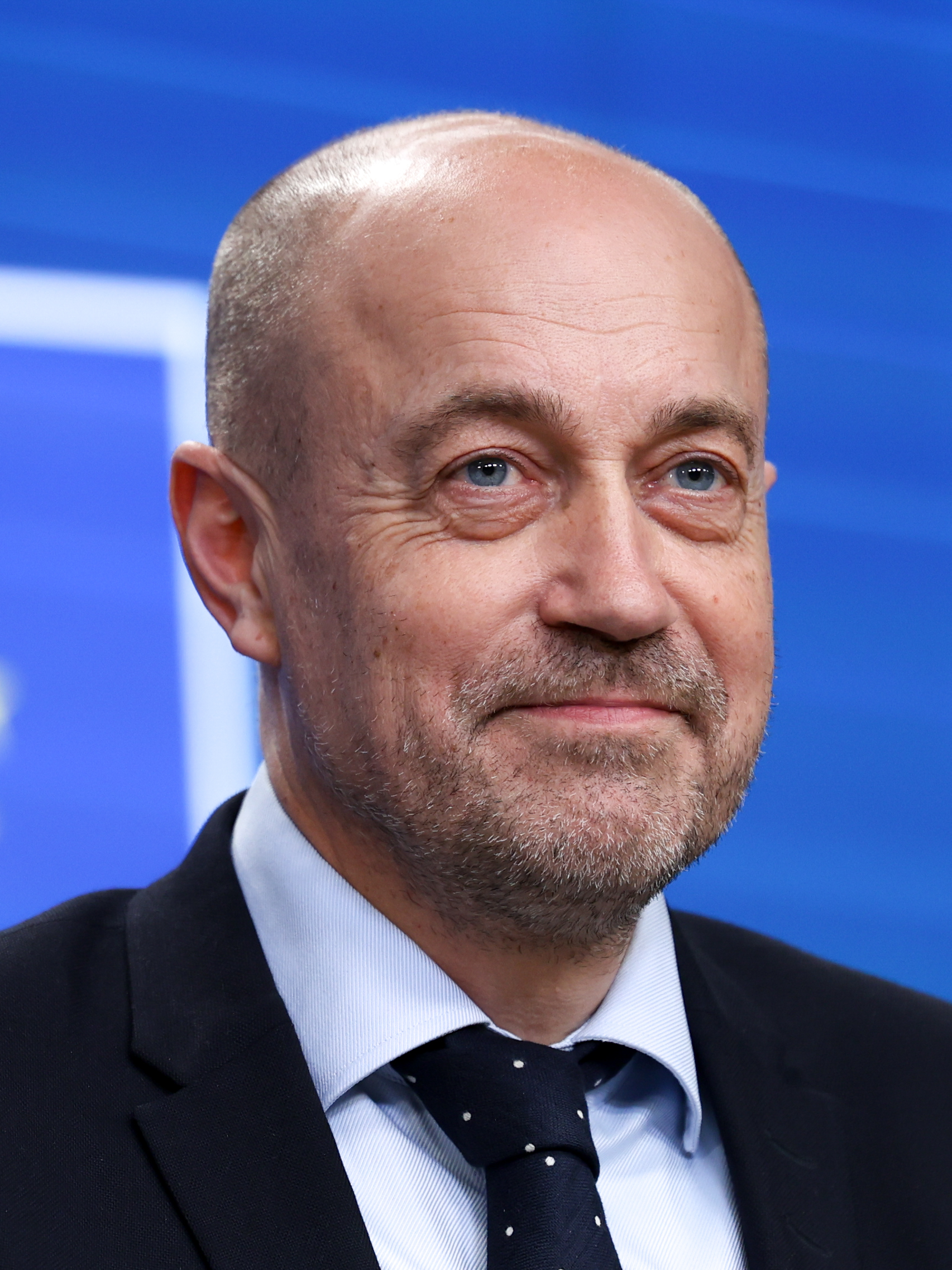
- Incumbent; Magnus Heunicke since 3 June 2026
- Ministry of Education
- Type: Minister
- Member of: Cabinet; State Council
- Reports to: the Prime minister
- Seat: Slotsholmen
- Appointer: The Monarch; (on the advice of the Prime Minister)
- Precursor: Kultus Minister
- Formation: 28 April 1916; 110 years ago
- First holder: Søren Keiser-Nielsen
- Succession: depending on the order in the State Council
- Deputy: Permanent Secretary
- Salary: 1.624.503,02 DKK (€217,931), in 2026
- Website: Official website

Minister of Education of Denmark (Danish: Undervisningsminister, pronounced [ˈɔnɐˌviˀsne̝ŋsmiˌnistɐ]), is a Danish minister office currently held by Magnus Heunicke in the third cabinet of Mette Frederiksen.

The office was created in 1916 when the post Kultus Minister was split up into the posts of Minister of Education and Minister for Ecclesiastical Affairs. Upon the accession of the first cabinet of Helle Thorning-Schmidt on 3 October 2011 the title was changed from Minister of Education to Minister of Children and Education and on 9 August 2013 the title was changed back to Minister of Education.

== List of officeholders ==
No.	Portrait	Name (born–died)	Term of office			Political party	Government	Ref.
No.	Portrait	Name (born–died)	Took office	Left office	Time in office	Political party	Government	Ref.
Minister of Education (Undervisningsminister)
1		Søren Keiser-Nielsen (1856–1926)	28 April 1916	30 March 1920	3 years, 337 days	Social Liberal	Zahle II	
2		Niels Thorkild Rovsing (1862–1927)	30 March 1920	5 April 1920	6 days	Independent	Liebe	
3		Peder Jørgen Pedersen (1870–1962)	5 April 1920	5 May 1920	30 days	Independent	Friis	
4		Jacob Appel (1866–1931)	5 May 1920	23 April 1924	3 years, 354 days	Venstre	Neergaard II–III	
5		Nina Bang (1866–1928)	23 April 1924	14 December 1926	2 years, 235 days	Social Democrats	Stauning I	
6		Jens Byskov (1867–1955)	14 December 1926	30 April 1929	2 years, 137 days	Venstre	Madsen-Mygdal	
7		Frederik Borgbjerg (1866–1936)	30 April 1929	4 November 1935	6 years, 189 days	Social Democrats	Stauning II	
8		Jørgen Jørgensen (1888–1974)	4 November 1935	9 November 1942	7 years, 5 days	Social Liberal	Stauning III–IV–V–VI; Buhl I	
9		A.C. Højberg Christensen (1888–1972)	9 November 1942	29 August 1943	293 days	Independent	Scavenius	
No Danish government (29 August 1943 (Note: On 29 August 1943, the Danish government resigned, refusing to grant further concessions to Nazi Germany. All government operations were assumed by the permanent secretaries of the individual departments, and this arrangement lasted until the Liberation of Denmark on 5 May 1945. Since King Christian X never accepted the resignation of the government, it existed de jure until a new cabinet was formed on 5 May 1945.) – 5 May 1945). Office is assumed by the permanent secretary.
10		Axel Hansen (1877–1960)	5 May 1945	7 November 1945	186 days	Social Liberal	Buhl II	
11		Mads R. Hartling (1885–1960)	7 November 1945	13 November 1947	2 years, 6 days	Venstre	Kristensen	
12		Hartvig Frisch (1893–1950)	13 November 1947	11 February 1950	2 years, 90 days	Social Democrats	Hedtoft I	
13		Julius Bomholt (1896–1969)	22 February 1950	30 October 1950	250 days	Social Democrats	Hedtoft I–II	
14		Flemming Hvidbjerg (1897–1959)	30 October 1950	30 September 1953	2 years, 335 days	Conservative People's Party	Eriksen	
(13)		Julius Bomholt (1896–1969)	30 September 1953	28 May 1957	3 years, 240 days	Social Democrats	Hedtoft III; Hansen I	
(8)		Jørgen Jørgensen (1888–1974)	28 May 1957	7 September 1961	4 years, 102 days	Social Democrats	Hansen II; Kampmann I–II	
15		Kristen Helveg Petersen (1909–1997)	7 September 1961	26 September 1964	3 years, 19 days	Social Liberal	Kampmann II; Krag I	
16		Knud Børge Andersen (1914–1984)	26 September 1964	2 February 1968	3 years, 129 days	Social Democrats	Krag II	
17		Helge Larsen (1915–2000)	2 February 1968	11 October 1971	3 years, 251 days	Social Liberal	Baunsgaard	
18		Knud Heinesen (1932–2025)	11 October 1971	27 September 1973	1 year, 351 days	Social Democrats	Krag III; Jørgensen I	
19		Ritt Bjerregaard (1941–2023)	27 September 1973	19 December 1973	83 days	Social Democrats	Jørgensen I	
20		Tove Nielsen (born 1941)	19 December 1973	13 February 1975	1 year, 56 days	Venstre	Hartling	
(19)		Ritt Bjerregaard (1941–2023)	13 February 1975	22 December 1978	3 years, 312 days	Social Democrats	Jørgensen II–III	
21		Dorte Bennedsen (1938–2016)	5 January 1979	10 September 1982	3 years, 248 days	Social Democrats	Jørgensen III–IV–V	
22		Bertel Haarder (born 1944)	10 September 1982	10 September 1987	5 years, 0 days	Venstre	Schlüter I	
Minister of Education and Science (Undervisnings- og forskningsminister)
(22)		Bertel Haarder (born 1944)	10 September 1987	25 January 1993	5 years, 137 days	Venstre	Schlüter II–III–IV	
Minister of Education (Undervisningsminister)
23		Ole Vig Jensen (1936–2016)	25 January 1993	23 March 1998	5 years, 57 days	Social Liberal	P. N. Rasmussen I–II–III	
24		Margrethe Vestager (born 1968)	23 March 1998	27 November 2001	3 years, 249 days	Social Liberal	P. N. Rasmussen IV	
25		Ulla Tørnæs (born 1962)	27 November 2001	18 February 2005	3 years, 83 days	Venstre	A. F. Rasmussen I	
(22)		Bertel Haarder (born 1944)	18 February 2005	23 February 2010	5 years, 5 days	Venstre	A. F. Rasmussen II–III; L. L. Rasmussen I	
26		Tina Nedergaard (born 1969)	23 February 2010	8 March 2011	1 year, 13 days	Venstre	L. L. Rasmussen I	
27		Troels Lund Poulsen (born 1974)	8 March 2011	3 October 2011	209 days	Venstre	L. L. Rasmussen I	
Minister of Children and Education (Børne- og undervisningsminister)
28		Christine Antorini (born 1965)	3 October 2011	9 August 2013	1 year, 310 days	Social Democrats	Thorning-Schmidt I	
Minister of Education (Undervisningsminister)
28		Christine Antorini (born 1965)	9 August 2013	28 June 2015	1 year, 323 days	Social Democrats	Thorning-Schmidt I–II	
Minister for Children, Education and Gender Equality (Minister for børn, undervisning og ligestilling)
29		Ellen Trane Nørby (born 1980)	28 June 2015	28 November 2016	1 year, 153 days	Venstre	L. L. Rasmussen II	
Minister of Education (Undervisningsminister)
30		Merete Riisager (born 1976)	28 November 2016	27 June 2019	2 years, 211 days	Liberal Alliance	L. L. Rasmussen III	
Minister of Children and Education (Børne- og undervisningsminister)
31		Pernille Rosenkrantz-Theil (born 1977)	27 June 2019	15 December 2022	3 years, 171 days	Social Democrats	Frederiksen I	
32		Mattias Tesfaye (born 1981)	15 December 2022	3 June 2026	3 years, 170 days	Social Democrats	Frederiksen II	
Minister of Education (Undervisningsminister)
33		Magnus Heunicke (born 1975)	3 June 2026	Incumbent	129 days	Social Democrats	Frederiksen III	
