= 1960 Danish general election =

- 15 November 1960
- All 179 seats in the Folketing; 90 seats needed for a majority
- Turnout: 85.84%
Party	Leader	Vote %	Seats	+/–
Social Democrats	Viggo Kampmann	42.10	76	+6
Venstre	Erik Eriksen	21.05	38	−7
Conservatives	Poul Sørensen	17.92	32	+2
SF	Aksel Larsen	6.14	11	New
Social Liberals	Jørgen Jørgensen	5.80	11	−3
Independents	Iver Poulsen	3.34	6	New
Schleswig Party		0.37	1	0
Elected in the Faroe Islands
Social Democratic	Peter Mohr Dam	34.23	1	+1
Union	Johan Poulsen	22.05	1	+1
Elected in Greenland
Independents	–	100	2	0
This lists parties that won seats. See the complete results below.
Results by constituency
Government before	Government after election
Kampmann I S–R–DR	Kampmann II; S–R

General elections were held in Denmark on 15 November 1960. The Social Democratic Party remained the largest in the Folketing, with 76 of the 179 seats. Voter turnout was 86% in Denmark proper, 57% in the Faroe Islands and 66% in Greenland. They were the last elections in which the electoral threshold for the Danish seats was 60,000 votes. The following year the electoral law was amended to make it 2% of the vote.

== Results ==
Party	Votes	%	Seats	+/–
Denmark proper
Social Democrats	1,023,794	42.10	76	+6
Venstre	512,041	21.05	38	–7
Conservative People's Party	435,764	17.92	32	+2
Socialist People's Party	149,440	6.14	11	New
Danish Social Liberal Party	140,979	5.80	11	–3
Independent Party	81,134	3.34	6	+6
Justice Party of Denmark	52,330	2.15	0	–9
Communist Party of Denmark	27,298	1.12	0	–6
Schleswig Party	9,058	0.37	1	0
Independents	109	0.00	0	0
Total	2,431,947	100.00	175	0
Valid votes	2,431,947	99.67		
Invalid/blank votes	7,989	0.33		
Total votes	2,439,936	100.00		
Registered voters/turnout	2,842,336	85.84		
Faroe Islands
Social Democratic Party	3,712	34.23	1	+1
Union Party	2,391	22.05	1	1
People's Party	2,158	19.90	0	–1
Independents	2,583	23.82	0	New
Total	10,844	100.00	2	0
Valid votes	10,844	99.50		
Invalid/blank votes	55	0.50		
Total votes	10,899	100.00		
Registered voters/turnout	19,089	57.10		
Greenland
Independents	8,489	100.00	2	0
Total	8,489	100.00	2	0
Valid votes	8,489	99.17		
Invalid/blank votes	71	0.83		
Total votes	8,560	100.00		
Registered voters/turnout	13,005	65.82		
