= Kristian Hansen Kofoed =

Danish civil servant and politician (1879–1951)

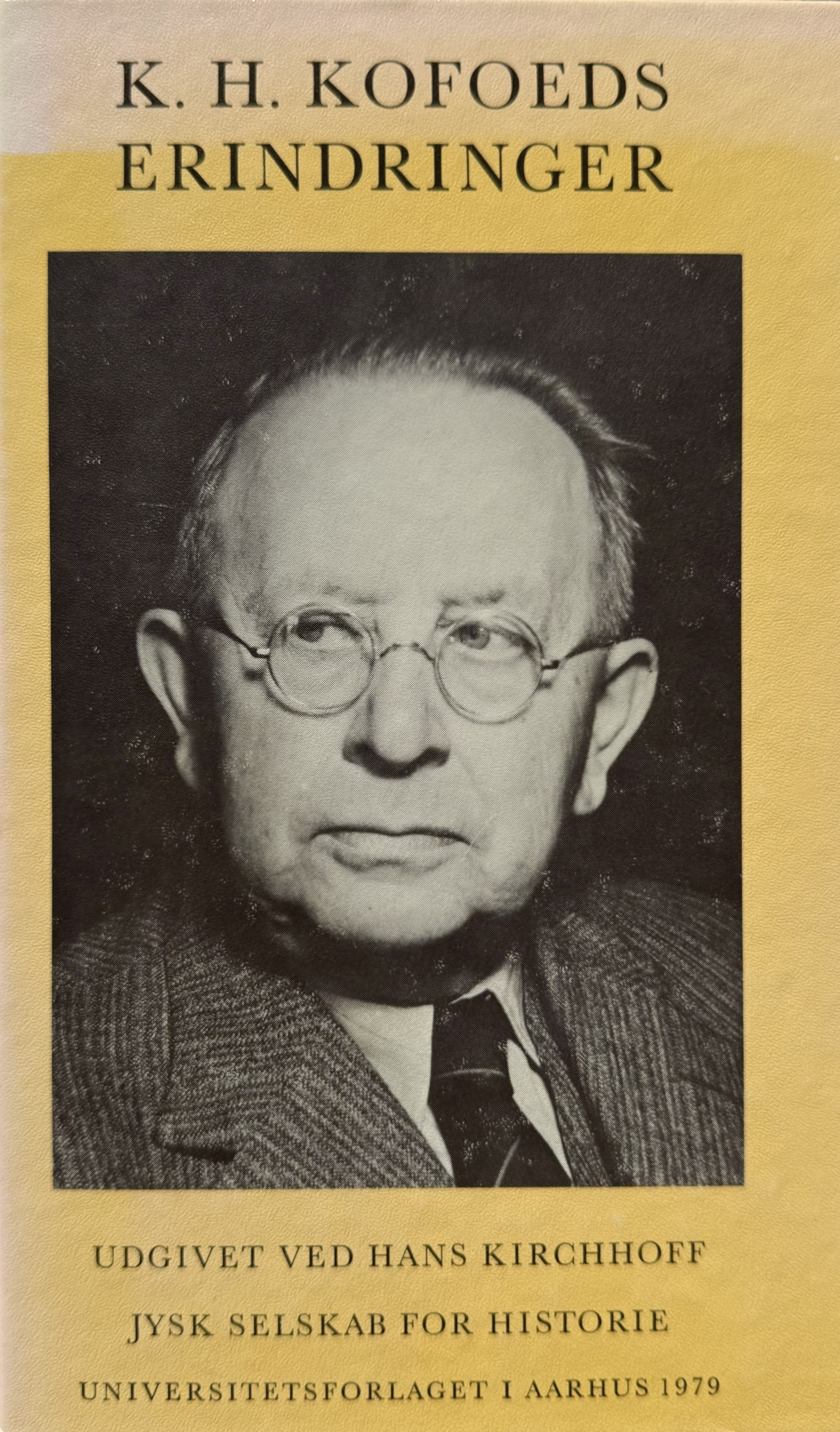
- Photo of Kristian Hansen Kofoed on cover of self-biography

Finance Minister
- In office November 1942 – 5 May 1945
- Prime Minister: Erik Scavenius
- Preceded by: Alsing Andersen
- Succeeded by: H. C. Hansen

Personal details
- Born: 11 March 1879
- Died: 14 May 1951 (aged 72)
- Party: Danish Social Liberal Party

Kristian Hansen Kofoed, known as KH Kofoed, (1879–1951) was a Danish civil servant and politician who served as the finance minister in the period 1942–1945.

== Biography ==
Kofoed was born on 11 March 1879. He received a degree in biology.

He was a member of the Danish Parliament for the Danish Social Liberal Party between 1913 and 1920. From 1916 he served in the commissions for the salary negotiations with the central union. In 1924 he was appointed permanent secretary of the Ministry of Finance led by Carl Valdemar Bramsnæs. Kofoed's appointment led to some controversy in that this post had been assumed by non-political figures who had a degree in law.

During the occupation of Denmark by Nazi Germany the Germans demanded the appointment of a new finance minister. Upon this request in November 1942 Kofoed was named minister of finance to the cabinet led by Prime Minister Erik Scavenius, replacing Alsing Andersen in the post. Kofoed remained in office until 5 May 1945 when H. C. Hansen was appointed finance minister.

He died on 14 May 1951.
