= Knud Heinesen =

Danish politician and economist (1932–2025)

Minister of Education
- In office 11 October 1971 – 27 September 1973
- Prime Minister: Jens Otto Krag; Anker Jørgensen
- Preceded by: Helge Larsen
- Succeeded by: Ritt Bjerregaard

Minister of Budget
- In office 27 September 1973 – 19 December 1973
- Prime Minister: Anker Jørgensen
- Preceded by: Per Hækkerup

Minister of Finance
- In office 13 February 1975 – 26 October 1979
- Prime Minister: Anker Jørgensen
- Preceded by: Anders Ejnar Andersen
- Succeeded by: Svend Jakobsen
- In office 30 December 1981 – 10 September 1982
- Prime Minister: Anker Jørgensen
- Preceded by: Svend Jakobsen
- Succeeded by: Henning Christophersen

Minister of Public Works
- In office 15 October 1981 – 30 December 1981
- Prime Minister: Anker Jørgensen
- Preceded by: Jens Risgaard Knudsen
- Succeeded by: J. K. Hansen

Personal details
- Born: 26 September 1932 Kerteminde, Denmark
- Died: 8 January 2025 (aged 92)
- Party: Social Democrats
- Education: University of Copenhagen
- Profession: Economist

Knud Heinesen (26 September 1932 – 8 January 2025) was a Danish economist and politician who held various cabinet posts, including the minister of education and minister of finance. In 1985 he retired from politics and was involved in business.

== Background ==
Heinesen was born in Kerteminde on 26 September 1932. He was adopted by his aunt at age seven when his mother died. He was raised in Vangede. He attended Aurehøj Gymnasium in Gentofte and graduated in 1951. He studied economics at the University of Copenhagen and graduated in 1959. He joined a social democratic student organization, Frit Forum, during his studies at the university.

Heinesen died on 8 January 2025, at the age of 92.

== Career ==
Following his graduation Heinesen worked as a high school teacher in Roskilde. In the period 1960–1962 he worked as a secretary in the Labor Movement's business council (AE), but he returned to Roskilde High School to work as the headmaster in 1962 and continued to work there until 1967. In 1963 Heinesen became a member of the Radio Council and in 1967 he was appointed chairman of the council which he held until 1971. The same year he resigned from his job as headmaster and began to involve in politics being a member of the Social Democrats. In 1971 Heinesen was elected to the Danish Parliament.

On 11 October 1971, Heinesen succeeded Helge Larsen as minister of education. He was in office until 27 September 1973 when Ritt Bjerregaard replaced him in the post in a cabinet reshuffle. Heinesen was appointed minister of budget 27 September 1973, replacing Per Hækkerup in the post. Heinesen's term was very brief and ended in December that year. His post was also discontinued by the new government. In 1975 he was named minister of finance in the second cabinet of Prime Minister Anker Jørgensen. He succeeded Anders Ejnar Andersen. Heinesen resigned from office in 1979 and was succeeded by Svend Jakobsen, but he served as the vice president of the Social Democrats.

Heinesen was named as the minister of public works on 15 October 1981 when Jens Risgaard Knudsen had to resign from the office due to his involvement in a scandal. His tenure ended on 30 December 1981. Heinesen's last cabinet post was the minister of finance which he held in the period between 1981 and 1982 again in the cabinet led by Anker Jørgensen. He was succeeded by Henning Christophersen as minister of finance.

Heinesen retired from politics in 1985 and became director of Copenhagen Airport. From 1989 to 1995 he served as the director of several companies and was also a member of the boards of different companies.
