= Frederik Borgbjerg =

Danish journalist (1866–1936)

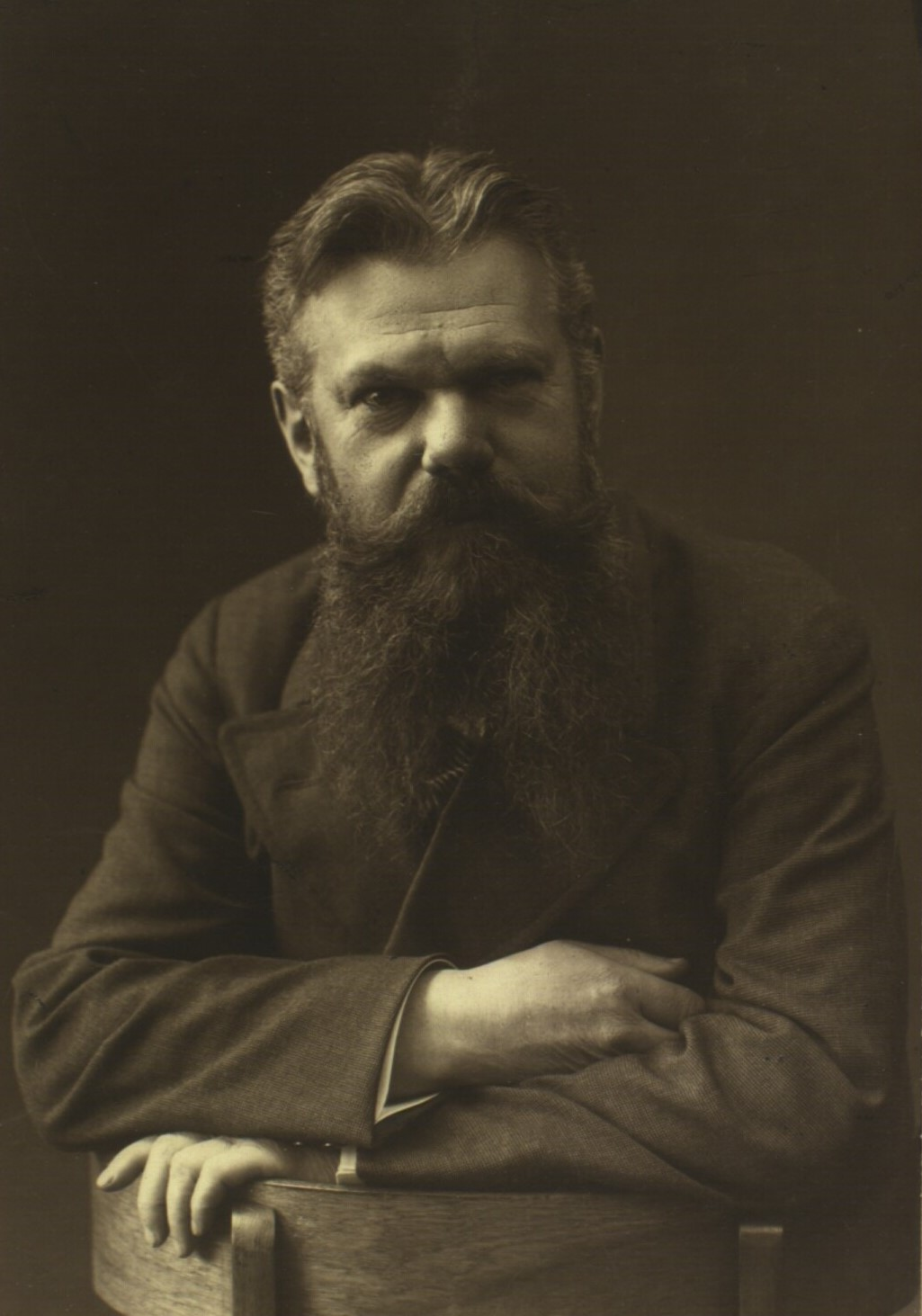
- Frederik Borgbjerg, 1910

Minister of Education
- In office 30 April 1929 – 4 November 1935
- Preceded by: Jens Byskov
- Succeeded by: Jørgen Jørgensen

Minister of Social Affairs
- In office 23 April 1924 – 14 December 1926

Personal details
- Born: Frederik Hedegaard Jeppesen; 10 April 1866 Boeslunde, Denmark
- Died: 15 January 1936 (aged 69) Copenhagen, Denmark
- Party: Social Democrats
- Education: University of Copenhagen

Frederik Hedegaard Borgbjerg (10 April 1866 – 15 January 1936) was a Danish politician, journalist and editor.

== Career ==
Borgbjerg studied philosophy and later theology at the University of Copenhagen. Initially influenced by Grundtvigism he as a Sunday school teacher and also a preacher. He then became socialist under the influence of the student society and joined the Social Democrats. In 1890 he became an employee at the Social-Demokraten. In 1911 he succeeded Emil Wiinblad as editor of the Social-Demokraten until 1924 and again from 1926 to 1929.

One of the most prominent intellectuals and orators of the Social Democrats, Borgbjerg was one of the main advocates of the reformist line within the party. Borgbjerg was Minister of Social Affairs from 1924 to 1926 and Minister of Education from 1929 to 1935. He was also an ember of the Danish Parliament from 1898 to 1936 and of the Copenhagen City Council from 1898 to 1904 and again from 1905 to 1913.

Borgbjerg died on January 15, 1936, during an operation for heart paralysis.
