= Alsing Andersen =

Danish politician

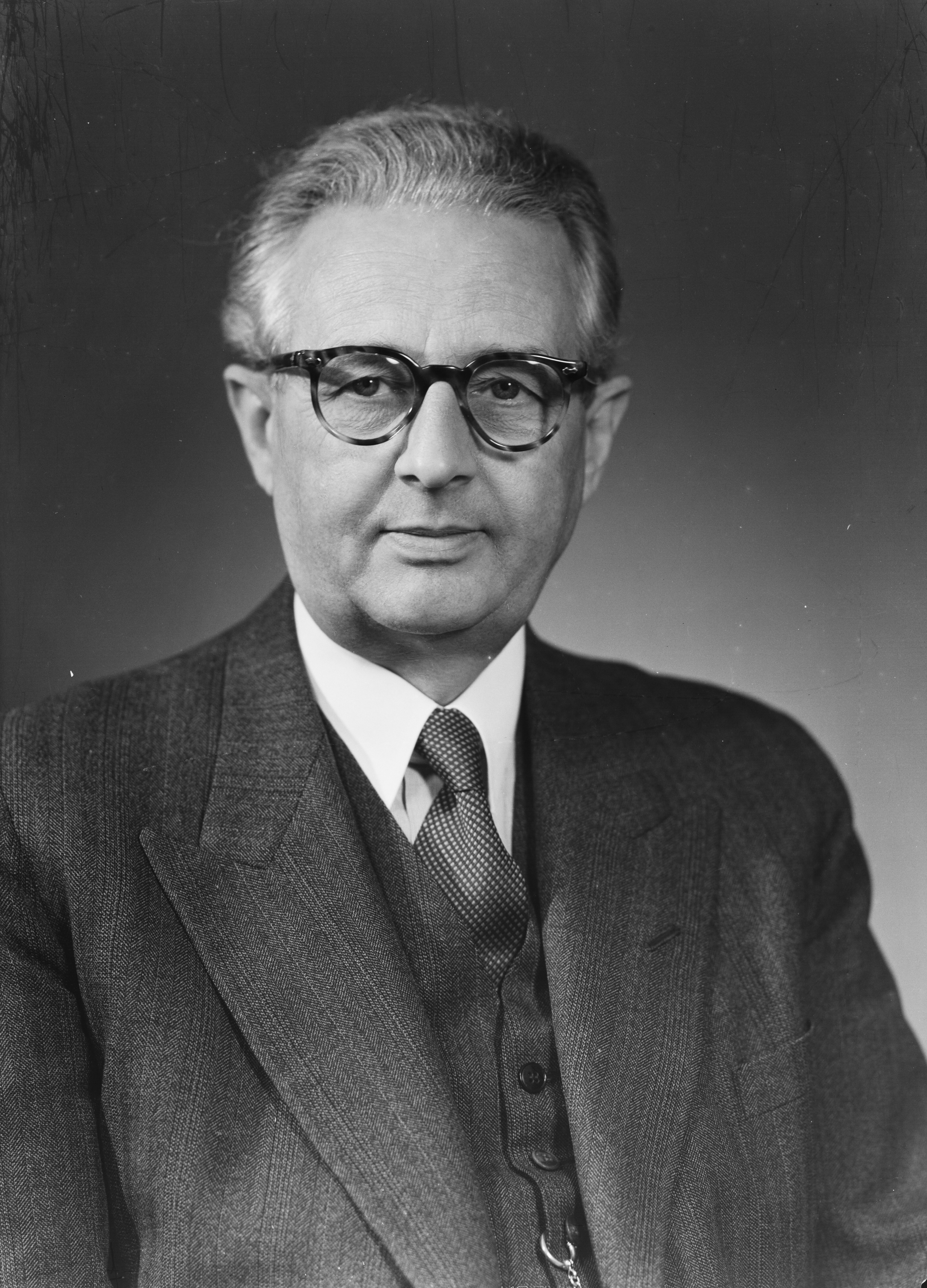

Minister of Defence
- In office 4 November 1935 – 10 April 1940

President of the Socialist International
- In office 6 July 1957 – 9 September 1963

Personal details
- Born: 5 February 1893 Copenhagen, Denmark
- Died: 5 December 1962 (aged 69)
- Party: Social Democrats
- Spouse: Else Obel (m. 1919)

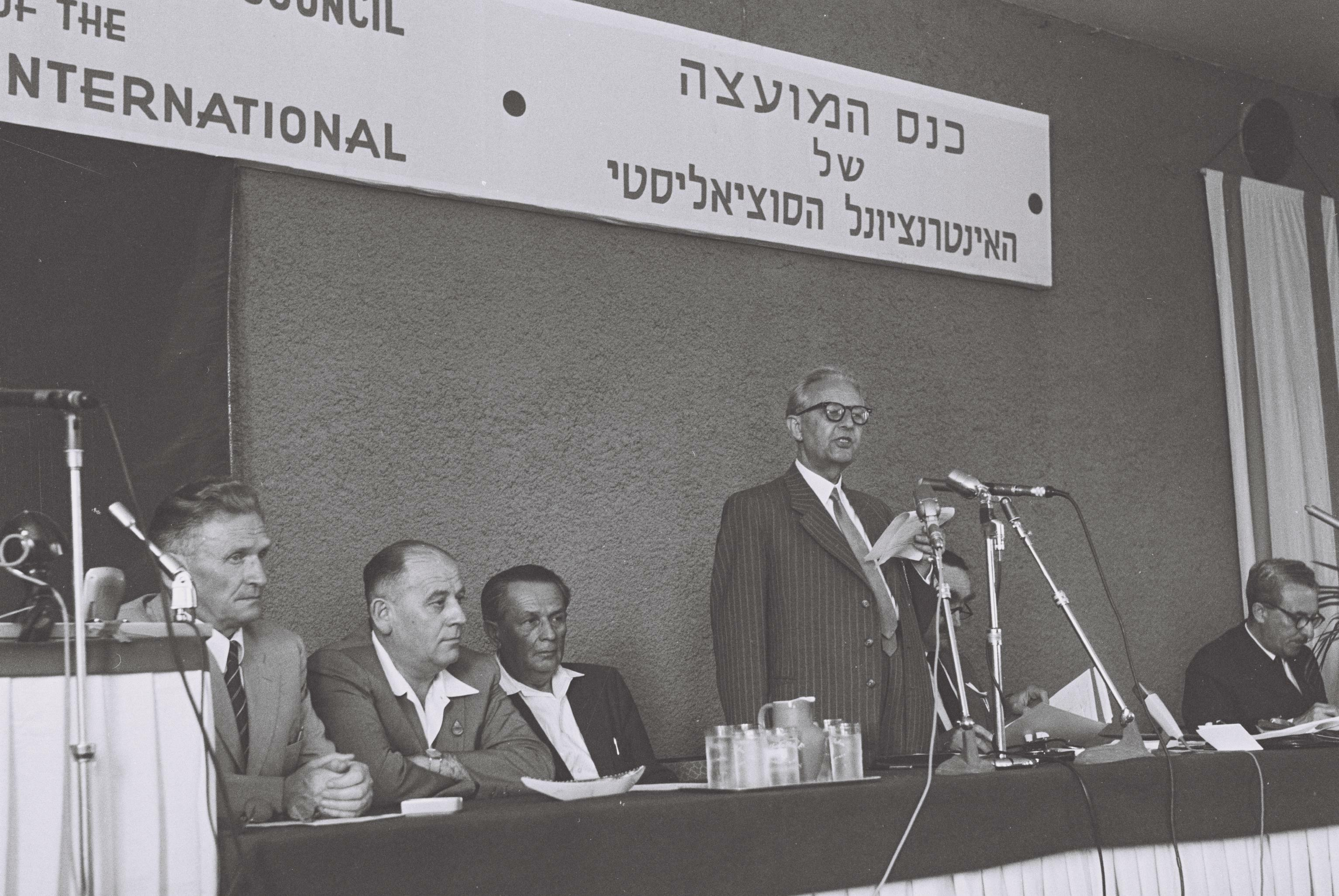
Alsing Andersen greeting at the convention of the council of Socialist International, Haifa 1960

Alsing Emanuel Andersen (5 February 1893 – 5 December 1962) was a Danish social democrat politician. Andersen served as the Minister of Defense (1935–1940) for Denmark. From 8 July 1940 to 1945, he served as the vice chairman of the Danish Social Democratic Party, and as the acting chairman of the party from the death of Thorvald Stauning (3 May 1942) until the end of the Nazi occupation of Denmark in 1945. Andersen briefly returned to national politics as the Minister of the Interior from 13 to 23 November 1947.

He later served as the second President of the Socialist International from 1957 to 1962. His other post-war activities include acting as a chairman for the United Nations Commission appointed to investigate the Hungarian Revolution of 1956.

Political offices
Preceded by Thorvald Stauning	Defence Minister of Denmark; 4 November 1935 – 8 July 1940	Succeeded by Søren Brorsen
Preceded by Vilhelm Buhl	Finance Minister of Denmark; 16 July 1942 – 9 November 1942	Succeeded by Kristian Hansen Kofoed
Preceded by Niels Ejlert Arnth Jensen	Interior Minister of Denmark; 13 November 1947 – 23 November 1947	Succeeded by Jens Smørum
