= Kjeld Philip =

Danish economist and politician

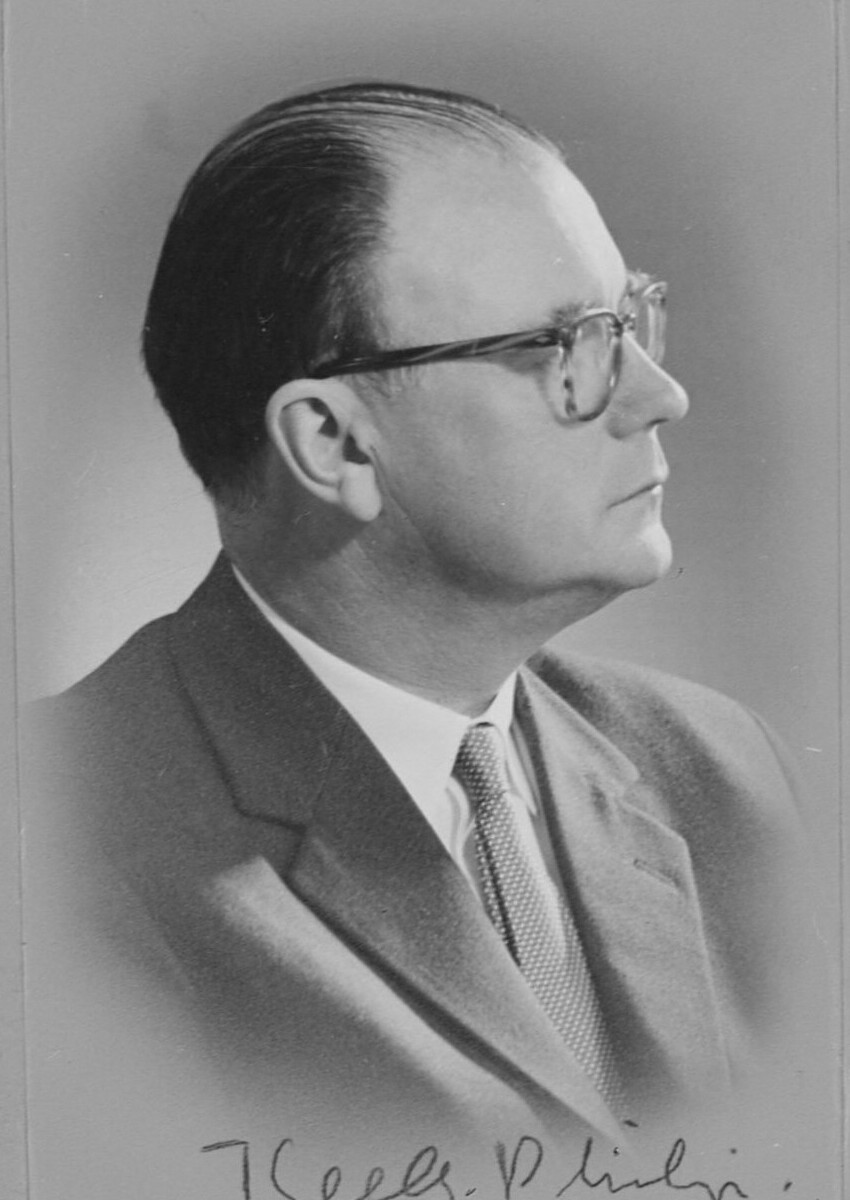

Kjeld Løwenstein Philip (3 April 1912 in Copenhagen – 27 October 1989) was a Danish economist and politician representing the Danish Social Liberal Party. He was Trade Minister from 1957 to 1960 as member of the Cabinet of H. C. Hansen II and the Cabinet of Viggo Kampmann I, Finance Minister from 1960 to 1961 as member of the Cabinets of Viggo Kampmann I and II and Minister for the Economy from 1961 to 1964 as member of the Cabinet of Viggo Kampmann II and the Cabinet of Jens Otto Krag I. He was member of the Danish parliament (the Folketing) from 1960 to 1964. His wife, Grethe Philip (1916–2016) was a member of parliament 1960–1979.

As Minister of Trade, Philip introduced the regional development act as well as a number of liberalisations that followed the membership of the European Free Trade Association in 1960.

Political offices
Preceded by Lis Groes	Trade Minister of Denmark; 28 May 1957 – 31 March 1960	Succeeded by Lars Peter Jensen
Preceded by Viggo Kampmann	Finance Minister of Denmark; 31 March 1960 – 7 September 1961	Succeeded by Hans R. Knudsen
Preceded by Bertel Dahlgaard	Minister for the Economy of Denmark; 7 September 1961 – 26 September 1964	Succeeded by Henry Grünbaum
