= H. C. Hansen =

Danish politician (1906–1960)

Hans Christian Hansen
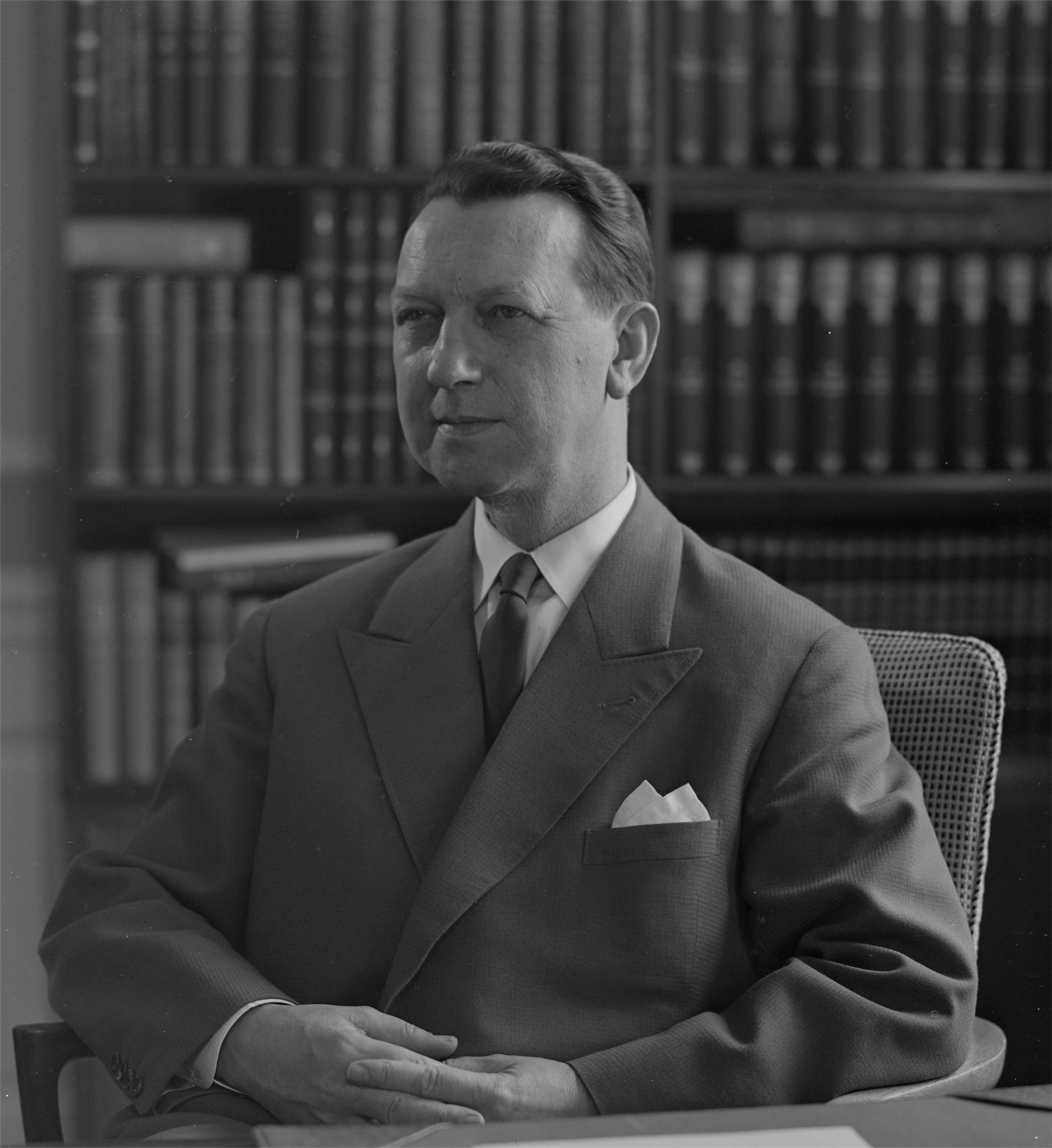

Prime Minister of Denmark
- In office 1 February 1955 – 19 February 1960
- Monarch: Frederik IX
- Preceded by: Hans Hedtoft
- Succeeded by: Viggo Kampmann

Minister for Foreign Affairs
- In office 30 September 1953 – 8 October 1958
- Prime Minister: Hans Hedtoft; Himself
- Preceded by: Ole Bjørn Kraft
- Succeeded by: Jens Otto Krag

Minister for Industry, Commerce and Seafare
- In office 16 September 1950 – 30 October 1950
- Prime Minister: Hans Hedtoft
- Preceded by: Jens Otto Krag
- Succeeded by: Ove Weikop

Minister for Finance
- In office 13 November 1947 – 16 September 1950
- Prime Minister: Hans Hedtoft
- Preceded by: Thorkil Kristensen
- Succeeded by: Viggo Kampmann
- In office 5 May 1945 – 7 November 1945
- Prime Minister: Vilhelm Buhl
- Preceded by: Kristian Hansen Kofoed (1943)
- Succeeded by: Thorkil Kristensen

Personal details
- Born: 8 November 1906 Aarhus, Denmark
- Died: 19 February 1960 (aged 53) Copenhagen, Denmark
- Party: Social Democrats

Hans Christian Svane Hansen (8 November 1906 – 19 February 1960), often known as H. C. Hansen or simply H. C., was a Danish politician who served as Prime Minister of Denmark from 1955 until his death in 1960. A Social Democrat, Hansen served as finance minister in the unity cabinet from May to November 1945 and again from 1947 to 1950 under Hans Hedtoft. He served as minister of industry, commerce and seafare in the final month of Hedtoft's first cabinet, and later became foreign minister in 1953, and continued in this post during his own premiership until 1958. He was elected leader of his party following the death of Hedtoft, making him the second consecutive prime minister to die in office.

He was the son of Christian Hansen (1875–1944) and Helene Helene Margrethe Sperling (1876–1933). He attended Samsøgades School until 7th grade. He continued his education as a typist apprentice. He was a secretary and later chairman in the Social Democratic Youth and became a member of parliament in 1936.

== Political career ==
As foreign minister, H. C. Hansen was seen as the natural successor as prime minister and leader of the Social Democrats, when his friend Hans Hedtoft died of a heart attack on 29 January 1955. In addition to becoming prime minister, H. C. Hansen also retained the post as foreign minister until 1958. Among the laws passed by this government included the universal people's pension and the enactment of agricultural price supports. The law on assistance to single mothers of April 1955 introduced special assistance for widows with children and certain other categories of single women, while under the Accident Insurance Act of 1959, an independent board of appeal was set up, waiting times were reduced, compensation for survivors was converted from lump sums into running benefits, and the scheme extended to cover occupational diseases. Under a law on relations between trade union a and employers’ associations, passed in April 1956, as an offshoot of collective agreement on the labour market, a new scheme provided sickness cash benefits significantly higher than in the existing health insurance scheme. The new scheme only covered members of trade unions and those employed by members of the Danish Employers’ Association. In addition, under the Apprenticeship Act of September 1956, theoretical training was introduced at technical schools as part of apprenticeship training. In 1956, universal pension coverage in Denmark was introduced, while the Survivors’ Pension Act of March 1959 introduced a general survivors’ pension scheme, including specific provisions for single women having reached age 60. In 1959, a law was enacted that led to the establishment of the Mental Retardation Service and a decentralised regional system of services for those with intellectual disabilities. That same year, an extension of covered occupational diseases in work injury compensation was carried out. In 1958, an education reform was enacted that reduced educational barriers.

In March 1957 it had been 4 years since the last election to the Folketing, and as mandated by the Danish constitution new elections were held. After the election H. C. Hansen was able to partner with the Danish Social Liberal Party (Radikale Venstre) and Justice Party of Denmark (Retsforbundet) to form the Cabinet of H.C. Hansen II, also known as the Triangle Cabinet (Trekantsregeringen).

On 25 March 1957 France, West Germany, Italy, Belgium, the Netherlands and Luxembourg signed the Treaty of Rome to create the European Economic Community. To not be left behind the Danish government first wanted to join a Nordic free trade organization, but that failed and Denmark joined the European Free Trade Association (EFTA) on 3 May 1960 instead. Unlike his successors as Social Democratic leaders and prime minister, Hansen did not support Denmark joining the European Economic Community that eventually took place in 1972.

H. C. Hansen died from cancer on 19 February 1960, and was succeeded by Viggo Kampmann in the Social Democratic party and as prime minister. He was the second Danish prime minister in a row to die while in office.

== Other sources ==
- Bjørn, Claus (1995). The Laws are given force: A Biography of Christian Colbiørnsen (Lovene gives kraft. En biografi af Chr. Colbiørnsen). Copenhagen: Lindhardt og Ringhof. ISBN 9788726101331.
- Kristian Hvidt (1995) Statsministre i Danmark fra 1913 til 1995 (Nyt nordisk forlag A. Busck) ISBN 9788717065703
- Donald F. Busky (2000) Democratic Socialism: A Global Survey (Praeger) ISBN 978-0275968861
- Peter Flora (1988) Growth to Limits: The Western European Welfare States Since World War II, Volume 4 (Walter de Gruyter, Inc.) ISBN 978-0899253985

Political offices
Preceded by Kristian Hansen Kofoed / none	Minister of Finance; May–November 1945	Succeeded by Thorkil Kristensen
Preceded by Thorkil Kristensen	Minister of Finance; 1947–1950	Succeeded by Viggo Kampmann
Preceded by Jens Otto Krag	Minister for Industry, Commerce and Seafare; September–October 1950	Succeeded by Ove Weikop
Preceded by Ole Bjørn Kraft	Minister of Foreign Affairs; 1953–1958	Succeeded by Jens Otto Krag
Preceded by Hans Hedtoft	Prime Minister of Denmark; 1955–1960	Succeeded by Viggo Kampmann
Party political offices
Preceded by Hans Hedtoft	Leader of the Danish Social Democrats; 1955–1960	Succeeded by Viggo Kampmann
