= Hilmar Baunsgaard =

Danish politician (1920–1989)

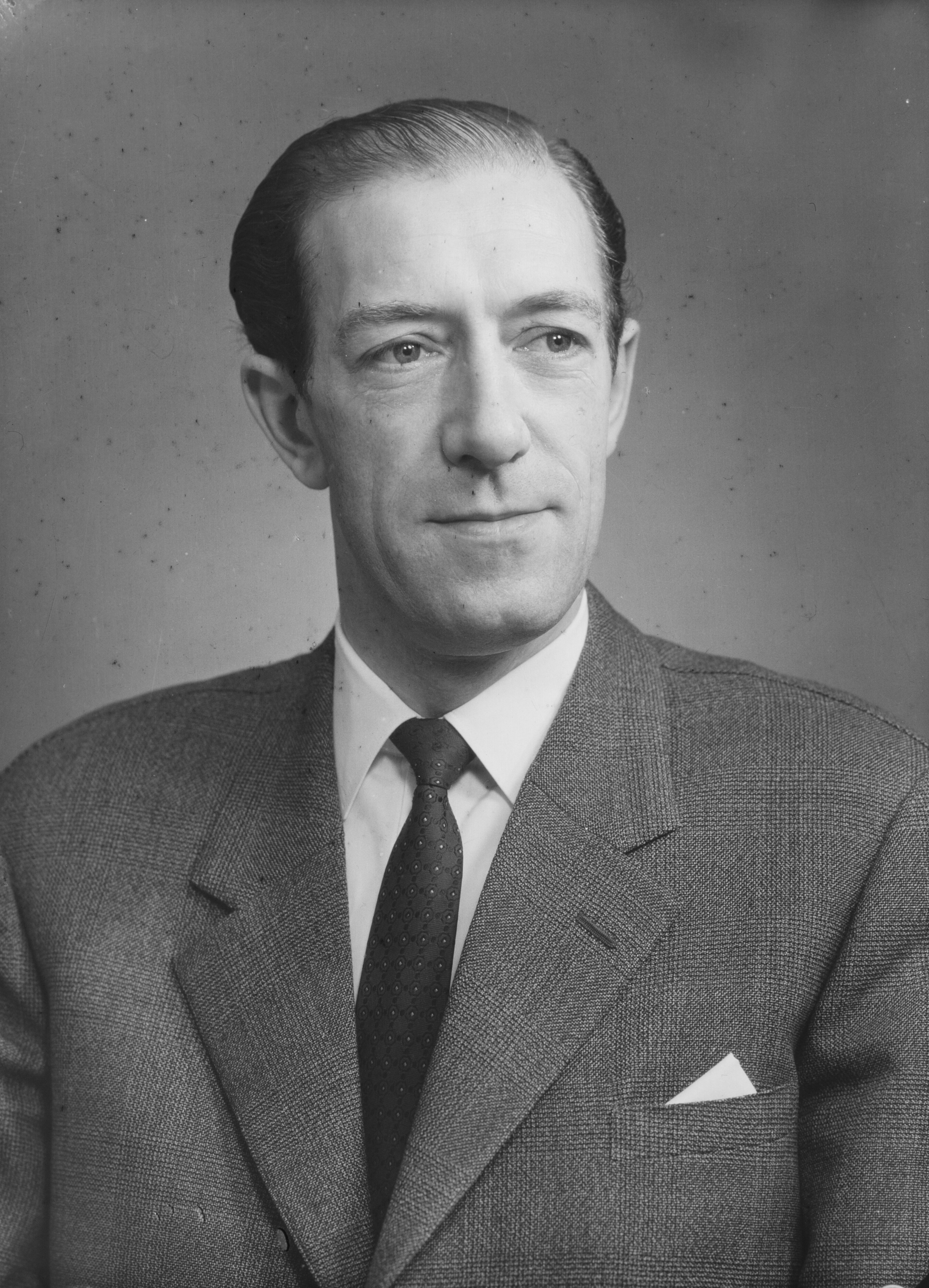
- Baunsgaard c. 1961

Prime Minister of Denmark
- In office 2 February 1968 – 11 October 1971
- Monarch: Frederik IX
- Preceded by: Jens Otto Krag
- Succeeded by: Jens Otto Krag

Minister of Commerce
- In office 7 September 1961 – 26 September 1964
- Prime Minister: Viggo Kampmann; Jens Otto Krag
- Preceded by: Lars P. Jensen
- Succeeded by: Lars P. Jensen

Personal details
- Born: Hilmar Tormod Ingolf Baunsgaard; 26 February 1920 Slagelse, Denmark
- Died: 30 June 1989 (aged 69) Copenhagen, Denmark
- Party: Social Liberal
- Spouse: Egone Baunsgaard

Hilmar Baunsgaard (26 February 1920 – 30 June 1989) was a Danish politician who served as the prime minister of Denmark from 1968 to 1971. He was a member of the Danish Social Liberal Party and the party's leader from 1968 to 1975. He was preceded and succeeded by the Social Democratic leader of that time, Jens Otto Krag as prime minister. Between 1948 and 1951, Baunsgaard served as the chairman of Social Liberal Youth of Denmark. In 1957, he became a Member of Parliament. He also served as minister of commerce from 1961 to 1964 under Viggo Kampmann and Jens Otto Krag.

Baunsgaard had an education in trade, and worked in the private business sector.

== Political career ==
By 1968 Baunsgaard's party had been a frequent coalition partner of the Social Democrats for the last 15 years. However, after the 1968 elections, he abandoned the Social Democrats and formed a centre-right coalition with the Conservative Party and the Liberal Venstre. The three parties held a clear majority of seats in the parliament. In spite of this, they utterly failed to tackle the growing problems of the welfare state and rein in public spending. As a result, taxation skyrocketed. In the social sphere the government was one of the most radical thus far seen in Denmark, abolishing censorship of pornography and legalising abortion. However, in doing so they alienated sufficient numbers of core supporters to lose the 1971 election, which brought the Social Democrats back to power.

Baunsgaard is often credited with being the first major Danish politician to truly embrace TV as the main media for communication with the voters. Although his appearance and style on the screen looks old-fashioned by today's standards, he was way ahead of his contemporaries in politics. He managed to connect with the voters, and was consistently rated as the most trustworthy politician from the mid-1960s to the early 1970s. However, his weak leadership of the government damaged his reputation. He remained as party leader until 1975, and resigned from parliament in 1977.

Baunsgaard was the main architect behind Nordek, a proposed organization for Nordic economic cooperation somewhat similar to the EEC (European Economic Community). The idea was embraced by both Sweden, Norway, and Iceland, but ultimately failed since Finland did not join due to its relationship with the Soviet Union, and Denmark joined the EEC.

Political offices
Preceded by Lars Peter Jensen	Trade Minister of Denmark; 7 September 1961 – 26 September 1964	Succeeded by Lars Peter Jensen
Preceded by Jens Otto Krag	Prime Minister of Denmark; 2 February 1968 – 11 October 1971	Succeeded by Jens Otto Krag
Party political offices
Preceded by Karl Skytte	Political leader of the Danish Social Liberal Party; 1968–1975	Succeeded by Svend Haugaard
