= Vester Åby =

- Town
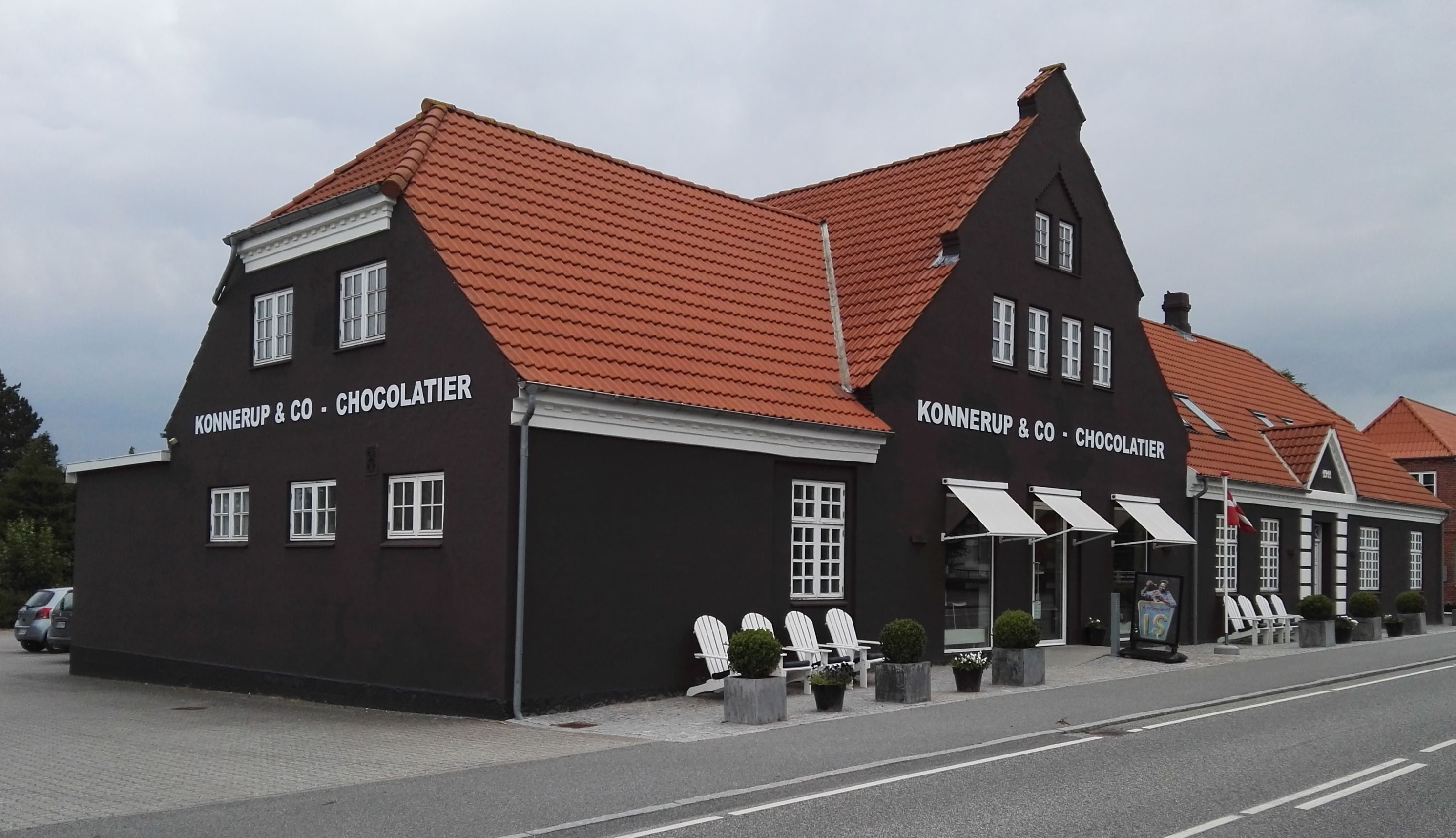
- Chocolate factory

- Location in the Region of Southern Denmark
- Coordinates: 55°5′5″N 10°22′29″E
- Country: Denmark
- Region: Southern Denmark
- Municipality: Faaborg-Midtfyn

Population (2026)
  - Total: 801
- Time zone: UTC+1 (CET)
  - Summer (DST): UTC+2 (CEST)

Vester Åby is a town located on the island of Funen in south Denmark, in Faaborg-Midtfyn Municipality. It is located 16 km west of Svendborg, 9 km south of Korinth, 10 km east of Faaborg and 24 km southwest of Ringe.

== Places of interest ==
In a former inn, Henrik Konnerup started a chocolate factory known as "Konnerup & Co" in 2003, which has 12 employees. The company went bankrupt in spring 2017, when its longtime financial partner could not continue. Local businessman Ole Billum bought the assets out of the bankruptcy estate so Konnerup could continue operations, but not as an owner.

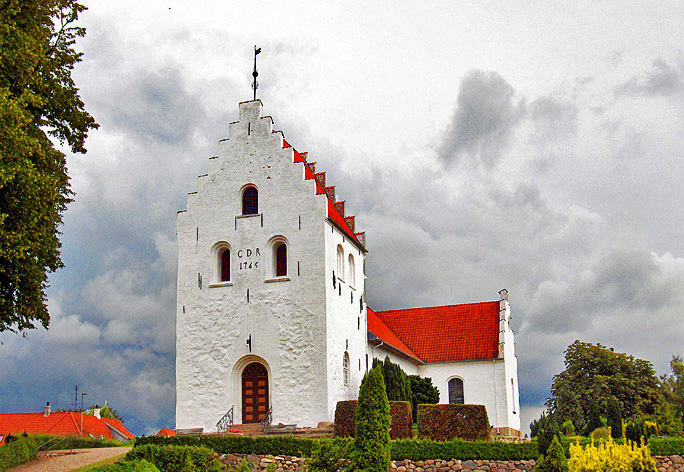
Vester Åby Church
