= Bertel Dahlgaard =

Danish politician

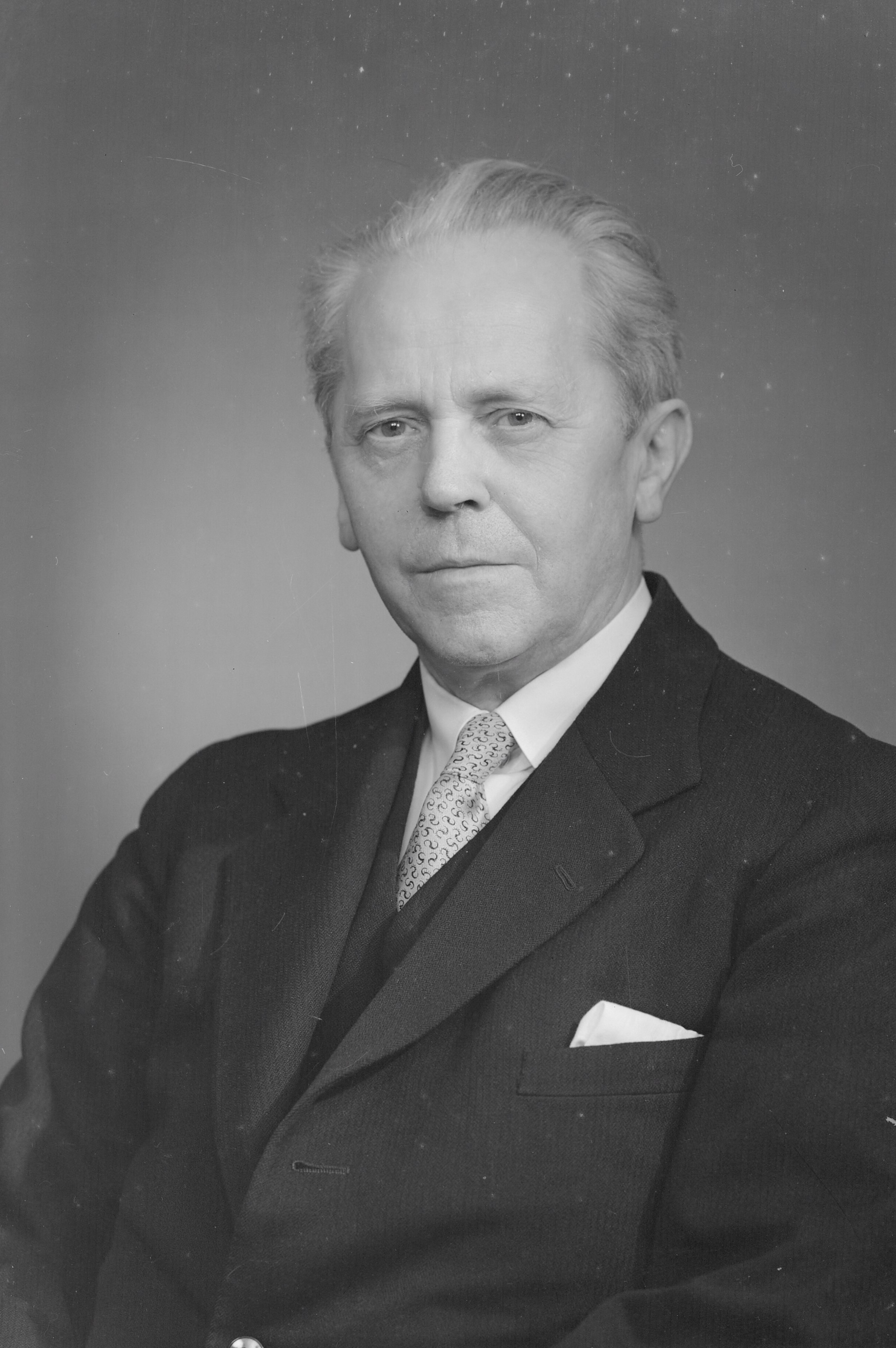
Bertel Dahlgaard

Bertel Dahlgaard (7 November 1887 – 31 March 1972), was a Danish politician, member of Folketinget for the Social Liberal Party 1920–1960, and statistician. As a Minister twice, and a leading member of his party for two decades, he was known for his pragmatism and tactical skills.

Political offices
Preceded by Oluf Krag	Interior Minister of Denmark; 30 April 1929 – 8 July 1940	Succeeded by Knud Kristensen
Preceded by Jens Otto Krag	Minister of Economic Affairs of Denmark; 28 May 1957 – 7 September 1961	Succeeded by Kjeld Philip
