= Julius Bomholt =

Danish politician

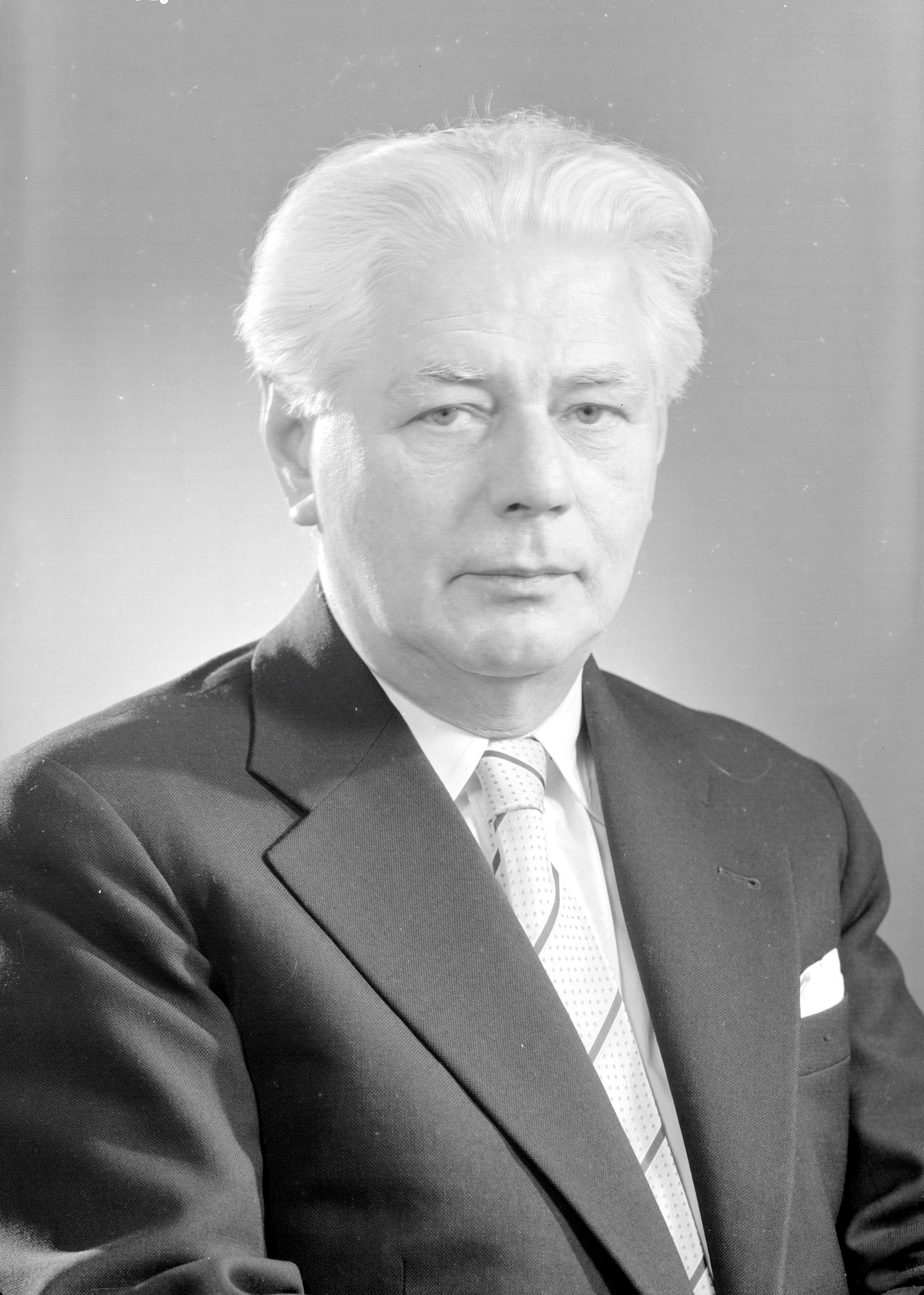
Julius Bomholt

Julius Bomholt (11 June 1896 – 2 January 1969) was a Danish politician representing the Social Democrats.

He was a member of the Folketing 1929–1968 and served as speaker in 1945–1950 and again 1964–1968. He served as Minister of Education in 1950 and 1953–1957, Minister of Social Affairs 1957–1961, and Minister of Culture 1961–1964.

He was awarded the Ingenio et Arti medal in 1966.

Political offices
Preceded by Hans Rasmussen	Speaker of the Folketing; 22 November 1945 – 22 February 1950	Succeeded by Gustav Pedersen
Preceded by Hartvig Frisch	Education Minister of Denmark; 11 February 1950 – 30 October 1950	Succeeded by Flemming Hvidberg
Preceded by Flemming Hvidberg	Education Minister of Denmark; 30 September 1953 – 28 May 1957	Succeeded by Jørgen Jørgensen
Preceded by Johan Strøm	Social Minister; 28 May 1957 – 7 September 1961	Succeeded by Kaj Bundvad
Preceded by Office established	Culture Minister of Denmark; 19 September 1961 – 26 September 1964	Succeeded by Hans Sølvhøj
Preceded by Gustav Pedersen	Speaker of the Folketing; 6 October 1964 – 22 January 1968	Succeeded by Karl Skytte
