= Jørgen Jørgensen (politician) =

Danish politician (1888–1974)

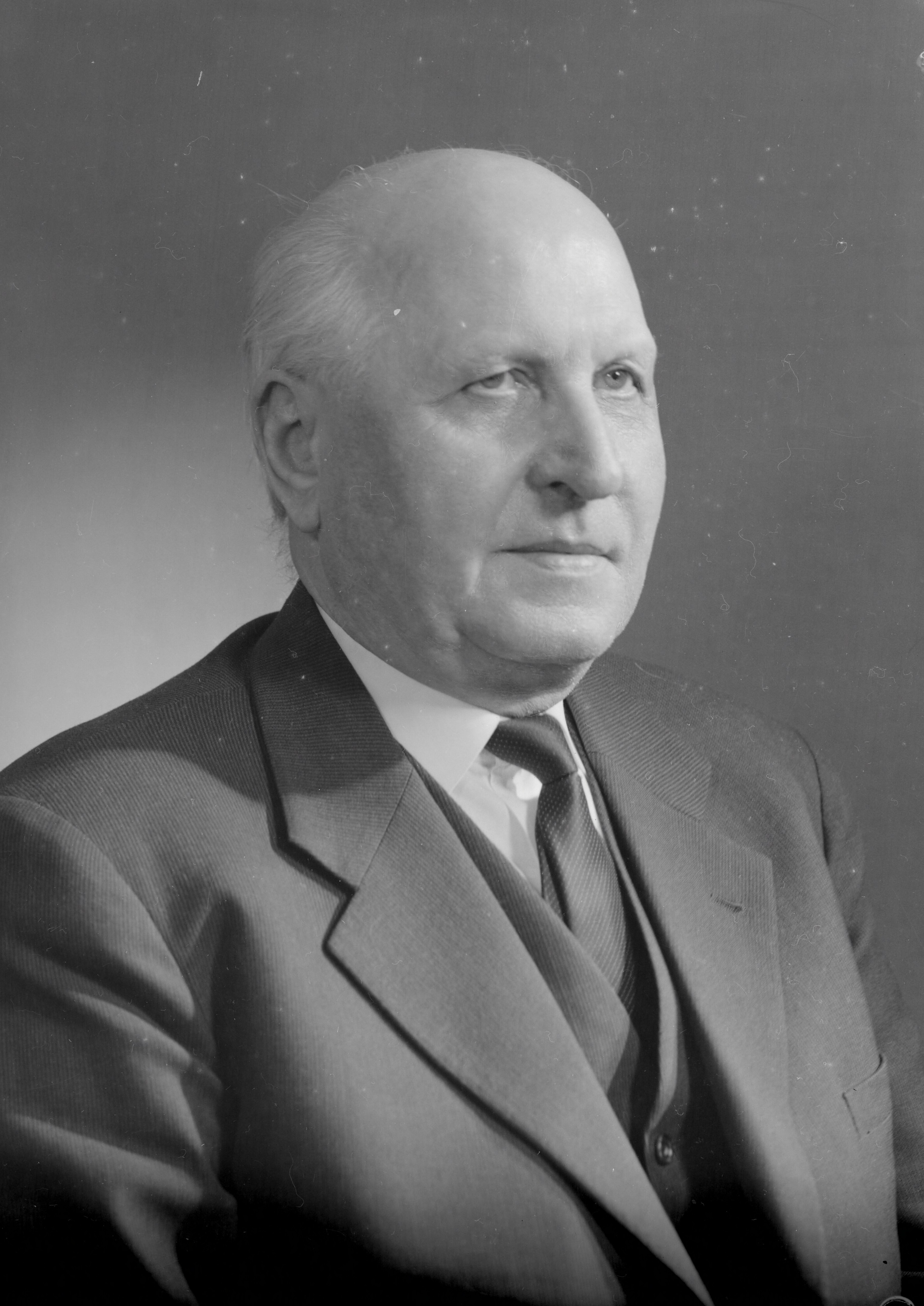
Jørgensen

Jørgen Peder Laurids Jørgensen (19 May 1888 in Kornerup – 15 December 1974), was a Danish politician and party leader. Member of Folketinget for the Social Liberal Party 1929–1960. Farmer by profession. As Minister for Education Jørgensen passed major school reforms in 1937 and 1958. He was party leader for two decades, although Bertel Dahlgaard, political spokesperson, and later minister for Economy, was co-leader. Jørgensen's mind and living was strongly influenced by the ideas of N. F. S. Grundtvig.

Two of Jørgen Jørgensen's sons, Eigil and Erling, achieved leading positions in the Danish Central Administration. A third son, Svend, took over the farm and became a mayor of his regional council twice.

Political offices
Preceded by Frederik Borgbjerg	Education Minister of Denmark; 4 November 1935 – 9 November 1942	Succeeded by A. C. Højbjerg Christensen
Preceded by Knud Kristensen	Interior Minister of Denmark; 9 November 1942 – 5 May 1945	Succeeded by Knud Kristensen
Preceded by Julius Bomholt	Education Minister of Denmark; 28 May 1957 – 7 September 1961	Succeeded by K. Helveg Petersen
Party political offices
Preceded by Peter Rochegune Munch	Political leader of the Danish Social Liberal Party; 1940–1960	Succeeded by Karl Skytte
