= Viggo Kampmann =

Danish politician

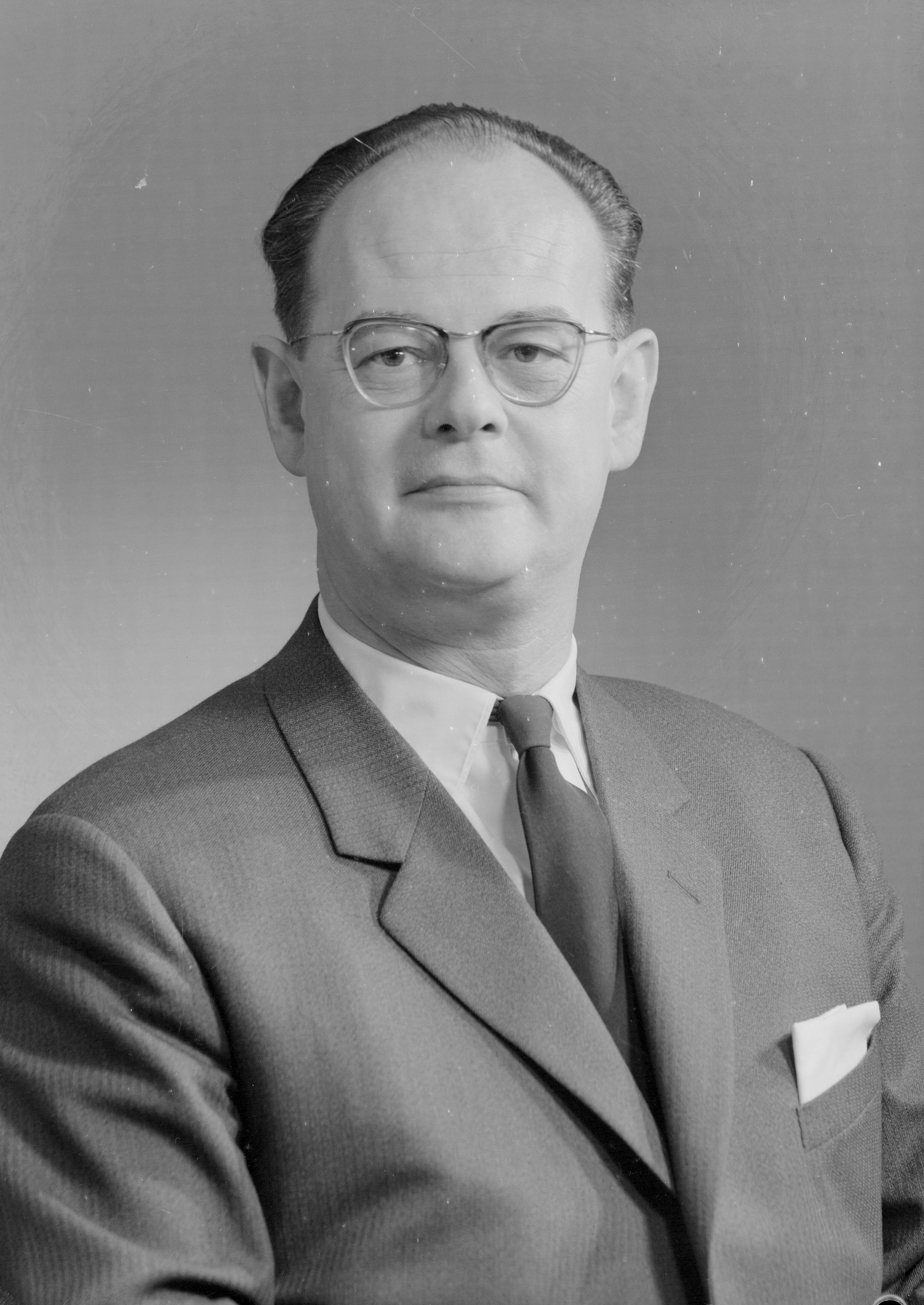
- Kampmann in 1960

Prime Minister of Denmark
- In office 21 February 1960 – 3 September 1962
- Monarch: Frederik IX
- Preceded by: H. C. Hansen
- Succeeded by: Jens Otto Krag

Minister for Finance
- In office 30 September 1953 – 31 March 1960
- Prime Minister: Hans Hedtoft; H. C. Hansen; Himself
- Preceded by: Thorkil Kristensen
- Succeeded by: Kjeld Philip
- In office 16 September 1950 – 30 October 1950
- Prime Minister: Hans Hedtoft
- Preceded by: H. C. Hansen
- Succeeded by: Thorkil Kristensen

Personal details
- Born: Olfert Viggo Fischer Kampmann; 21 July 1910 Frederiksberg, Denmark
- Died: 3 June 1976 (aged 65) Store Torøje, Faxe, Denmark
- Party: Social Democrats
- Spouses: Ulla Knudsen (m. 1970–1976) Eva Marie Hedevig Brinch (m. 1942; div. 1970) Karen Elisabeth Jensen (m. 1934; div. 1941)
- Children: 5, including Jens
- Education: University of Copenhagen

Olfert Viggo Fischer Kampmann (Danish pronunciation: [ˈʌlˀfɐt ˈviko ˈfiɕɐ ˈkʰɑmpˌmænˀ]; 21 July 1910 – 3 June 1976) was a Danish politician who served as the leader of the Danish Social Democrats and prime minister of Denmark from 1960 to 1962. He formed his first cabinet just prior to the 1960 election, which was a coalition between the Social Democrats, the Justice Party and Social Liberal Party. Following the election, he formed another cabinet with the latter of the two parties.

Before becoming prime minister he served as finance minister from 1953 to 1960 under Hans Hedtoft and H. C. Hansen.

Kampmann was born in Frederiksberg Denmark. He came from an academic background and was the first academic to rise to a high rank in the Danish Social Democratic Party. He studied economics at the University of Copenhagen, gaining a cand.polit. degree in 1934. Before becoming Minister of Finance, Kampmann worked in the newly formed economical secretariat as the Finance Minister's closest adviser. He was first elected to the Folketing in 1953.

== Political career ==
When Prime Minister and Social Democrat H. C. Hansen died in February 1960 Kampmann succeeded him, creating the Cabinet of Viggo Kampmann I. H. C. Hansen had cooperated with the Danish Social Liberal Party and the Justice Party, but Kampmann had problems working with the Justice Party. After the 1960 Danish parliamentary election, the Justice Party failed to get into Folketinget and the Danish Social Liberal Party went from 14 to 11 mandates. But the Social Democrats gained 6 mandates to 76, and Kampmann was able to form a minority government with the Social Liberal Party.

A number of progressive reforms were introduced during Kampmann's time as prime minister. The Rehabilitation Act of March 1960 established a unified framework providing rehabilitation, aids, vocational training, and special training centres for partially disabled and handicapped persons. Under the New Public Assistance Act of May 1961 (which replaced the 1933 Act) public assistance no longer resulted in the loss of political rights and restrictions on marriage. In 1961, health insurance was made compulsory.

In 1962 the oms, the precursor to the moms, was introduced.

Kampmann was one of the most intelligent and knowledgeable Danish Prime Ministers, though his conduct in office was erratic. Through most of his adult life he suffered from bipolar disorder, and in his darker moments he tended towards alcoholism and frequently 'disappeared' from view for days at a time, leaving the government without its head. The press of the day, more discreet than their contemporary peers, never publicised any of this.

Kampmann resigned on 3 September 1962 after a series of heart attacks, and was succeeded by Jens Otto Krag as leader of the Social Democrats and as prime minister. In retirement he worked as a political commentator and head of the Press Complaints Commission. Kampmann died in Store Torøje on 3 June 1976.

Political offices
Preceded by Hans Christian Hansen	Finance Minister of Denmark; 16 September 1950 – 30 October 1950	Succeeded by Thorkil Kristensen
Preceded by Thorkil Kristensen	Finance Minister of Denmark; 30 September 1953 – 31 March 1960	Succeeded by Kjeld Philip
Preceded by Hans Christian Hansen	Prime Minister of Denmark; 21 February 1960 – 3 September 1962	Succeeded by Jens Otto Krag
Party political offices
Preceded by H. C. Hansen	Leader of the Danish Social Democrats; 1960–1962	Succeeded by Jens Otto Krag
