= Jens Otto Krag =

Prime Minister of Denmark (1914–1978)

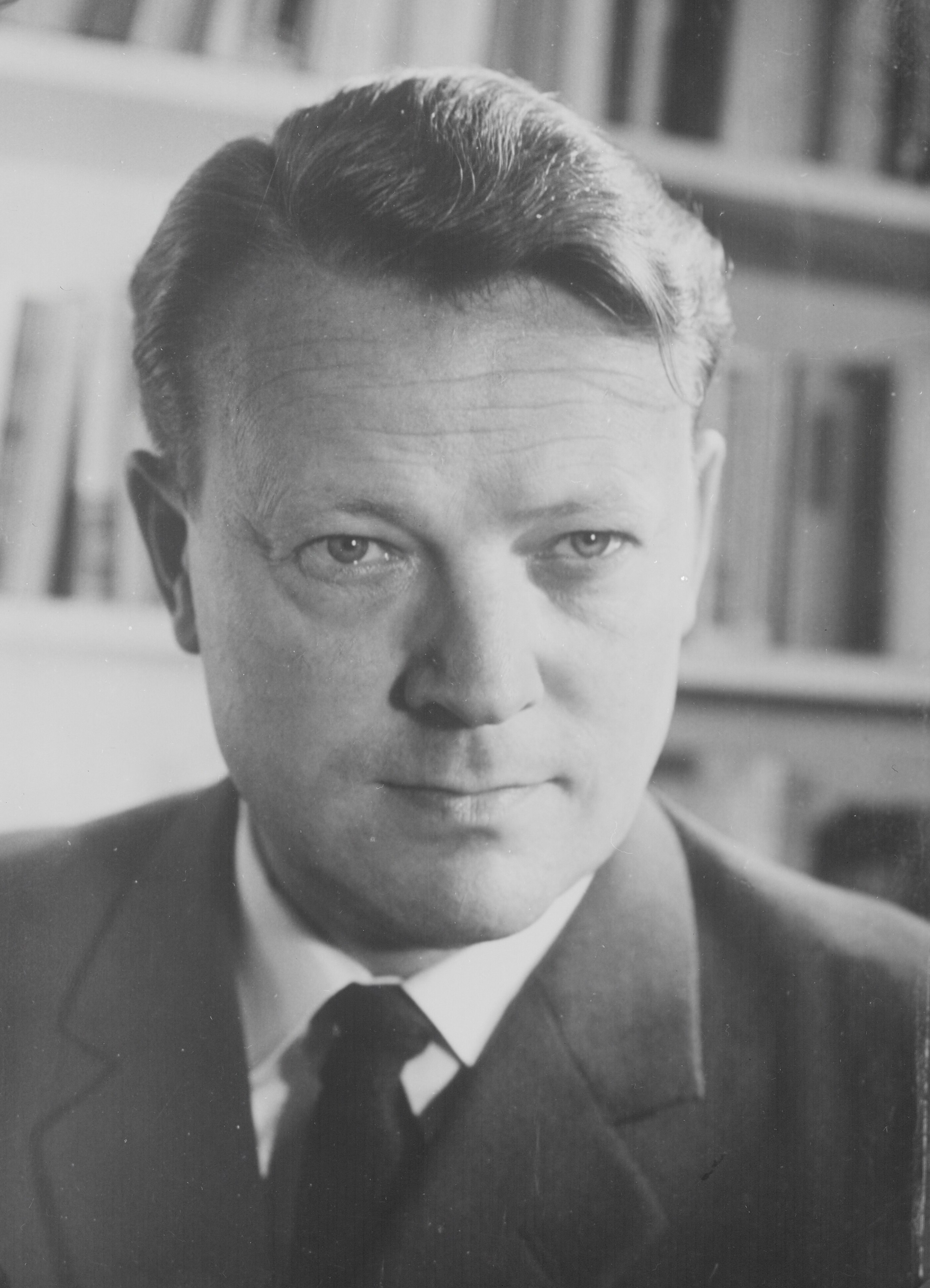
- Krag in the 1960s

Prime Minister of Denmark
- In office 11 October 1971 – 5 October 1972
- Monarchs: Frederik IX; Margrethe II
- Preceded by: Hilmar Baunsgaard
- Succeeded by: Anker Jørgensen
- In office 3 September 1962 – 2 February 1968
- Monarch: Frederik IX
- Preceded by: Viggo Kampmann
- Succeeded by: Hilmar Baunsgaard

Leader of the Social Democrats
- In office 1962–1972
- Preceded by: Viggo Kampmann
- Succeeded by: Anker Jørgensen

President of the Nordic Council
- In office 1 January 1971 – 31 December 1971
- Preceded by: Sigurður Bjarnason
- Succeeded by: V. J. Sukselainen
Ministerial positions
Minister of Industry, Trade and Seafaring
In office 13 November 1947 – 16 September 1950
Prime Minister	Hans Hedtoft
Preceded by	Axel Kristensen
Succeeded by	H. C. Hansen
Minister of Foreign Affairs
In office 28 November 1966 – 1 October 1967
Prime Minister	Himself
Preceded by	Per Hækkerup
Succeeded by	Hans Tabor
In office 8 October 1958 – 3 September 1962
Prime Minister	H. C. Hansen; Viggo Kampmann
Preceded by	H. C. Hansen
Succeeded by	Per Hækkerup
Minister without Portfolio
In office 30 September 1953 – 31 October 1953
Prime Minister	Hans Hedtoft
Minister of Economic Affairs and Labour
In office 31 October 1953 – 28 May 1957
Prime Minister	Hans Hedtoft; H. C. Hansen
Preceded by	New office
Succeeded by	Office abolished
Minister for Foreign Financial Affairs
In office 28 May 1957 – 8 October 1958
Prime Minister	H. C. Hansen
Preceded by	New office
Succeeded by	Office abolished

Member of the Folketing
- In office 1947–1950
- In office 1953–1973
- Constituency: Randers

Personal details
- Born: 15 September 1914 Randers, Denmark
- Died: 22 June 1978 (aged 63) Ålbæk, Denmark
- Party: Social Democrats
- Spouses: Birgit Tengroth (m. 1950; div. 1952) Helle Virkner (m. 1959; div. 1973)
- Children: 2
- Education: University of Copenhagen

Jens Otto Krag (Danish pronunciation: [ˈjens ˈʌtsʰo ˈkʰʁɑˀw]; 15 September 1914 – 22 June 1978) was a Danish politician, who served as the prime minister of Denmark from 1962 to 1968 and again from 1971 to 1972, and as leader of the Social Democrats from 1962 to 1972. He was president of the Nordic Council in 1971.

== Early life and career ==
Krag was born on 15 September 1914 in Randers, Jutland, into the impoverished family of a tobacconist. Krag attended the local gymnasium, and as a teenager, he joined the Social Democratic Youth of Denmark, the youth wing of the Social Democrats. In 1933, Krag began studying economics at the University of Copenhagen. During this period, he emerged as an active journalist and teacher in the labour movement, and became acquainted with the leadership of the Social Democrats and the trade unions.

Following the Nazi invasion of Denmark, Krag received his degree in 1940. During the Nazi occupation, Krag worked as a civil servant in a Danish government agency and became a leading economic advisor to the labour movement, as well as a protégé of prominent social democrat and future prime minister Hans Hedtoft.

== Political career ==
In 1944, Krag began his political career as the secretary of a program committee set up by the Social Democratic Party, as it prepared itself for politics in the post-war period. Under his leadership, the committee developed the new party program "Denmark of the Future" (Fremtidens Danmark), which presented proposals for nationalisation and notions of Keynesian economics and economic democracy. Despite the party's poor performance in the first post-war election in 1945, Krag and new party program of the Social Democrats achieved notoriety in Danish politics under Vilheim Buhl's cabinet.

=== Member of Folketing ===
Krag was elected to Parliament (Folketing) in 1947 and was appointed Minister of Commerce. He supported the strengthening of the Danish military and Danish membership of NATO in 1949.

In 1950, Krag resigned from Parliament partially due to a conflict with Vilhelm Buhl and H. C. Hansen and, in order to become more fluent in the English language and see more of the world, requested a position at the Danish embassy in the United States. He received the position, and was in America until 1953 when he was re-elected to parliament and became a minister without portfolio. He was minister of the new department of foreign economic affairs from 1953 until 1958 and Foreign Minister from 1958 until 1962.

=== Prime minister ===
In September 1962 he succeeded Viggo Kampmann as prime minister and leader of the Danish Social Democratic Party. He was prime minister until February 1968 when the Social Democrats lost power. He became prime minister again in 1971 when his party returned to power. Less than a year into his first term as prime minister, the opposition held a referendum which rejected a set of land laws already passed by Krag's government.

During his second term as prime minister, Krag campaigned particularly for European cooperation and unity. He sponsored a referendum for Denmark to join the European Economic Community. In 1972 the referendum passed, but the nation was divided over the issue, and Krag resigned, claiming that he had become tired of politics. His last role in public life was as the European Common Market representative to the United States from 1974 until 1975.

In social policy, a number of progressive reforms were implemented during Krag's time as prime minister. Under the New Care of Children and Juveniles Act of May 1964, local child and juvenile welfare committees were authorized to grant cash benefits to certain families with children, to avoid placing children in the care of the Municipal Social Welfare Offices. New criteria for day-care institutions stressing social, educational, and therapeutic aspects were also introduced, and municipalities were obliged to provide facilities for day-care and other related services. Under the Employment Service and Unemployment Insurance Act of February 1967, unemployment benefits were raised and indexed to the official wage index and waiting times were abolished. In addition, an accident insurance act of December 1964 indexed benefits. The Basic Education Act of April 1972 extended compulsory basic education from 7 to 9 years. while A law passed in June 1972 introduced a new scheme for daily cash benefits in cases of sickness and maternity. In 1964, a supplementary pension scheme was established, together with universal child allowances in 1967.

== Personal life ==
Krag had a difficult personal life. He married two times, with two marriages ending in divorce, largely due to his own infidelity.

In 1950, he married his first wife, Swedish actress Birgit Tengroth. They officially divorced in 1952 after two years marriage; the couple had no children. Seven years later, he was married his second wife, Danish actress Helle Virkner (1925–2009) from 1959 until their divorce in 1973. The couple had two children, Jens Christian (son) (born 1960) and Astrid Helene "Søsser" (daughter) (1962–2014), as well as another child outside of wedlock (Peter Hansted). During his time in politics, Krag struggled with alcoholism, an addiction that became more pronounced after his retirement.

Krag was an atheist.

== Death and legacy ==
Krag died of congestive heart failure at his home in Skiveren, Ålbæk, Denmark, at the age of 63.

In Denmark, Krag is widely recognized as one of the greatest Danish politicians of all time. He was in the front line of politics for 25 years, holding high ministerial offices for most of that time. He managed to raise Denmark's profile on the world stage, building strong relationships with fellow European leaders as well as American presidents Kennedy and Johnson. He oversaw one of the longest periods of economic expansion in Danish history. However, his greatest achievement, and the one he was most proud of, was taking Denmark into the European Economic Community 1973. With that task accomplished he felt he could retire at a high point.

Krag was at one and the same time one of the most charismatic and withdrawn Danish politicians ever. He never enjoyed the attention to which he had to subject himself, and many people found him rather arrogant. According to his most thorough (and quite sympathetic) biographer (Bo Lidegaard, Krag I-II, 2001/2002), he never truly settled into the role as a politician, always considering himself on the way "to somewhere else." He had always dreamed of holding the position of governor of the National Bank of Denmark. Only when he had definitively quit politics in 1972 did he realise that he would not be able to achieve this goal.

In the Danish TV series Krøniken (2004–2006), he was portrayed by the actor Lars Mikkelsen.

Political offices
Preceded by Axel Kristensen	Minister of Industry, Trade and Seafaring; 13 November 1947 – 16 September 1950	Succeeded by H. C. Hansen
Preceded by New office	Minister without Portfolio of Denmark; 30 September 1953 – 31 October 1953	Succeeded by Office abolished
Preceded by New office	Minister of Economic Affairs and Labour; 31 October 1953 – 28 May 1957	Succeeded by Office abolished
Preceded by New office	Minister of Foreign Financial Affairs of Denmark; 28 May 1957 – 8 October 1958	Succeeded by Office abolished
Preceded by Hans Christian Hansen	Foreign Minister of Denmark; 8 October 1958 – 3 September 1962	Succeeded by Per Hækkerup
Preceded by Viggo Kampmann	Prime Minister of Denmark; 3 September 1962 – 2 February 1968	Succeeded by Hilmar Baunsgaard
Preceded by Per Hækkerup	Foreign Minister of Denmark; 28 November 1966 – 1 October 1967	Succeeded by Hans Tabor
Preceded by Viggo Kampmann and Hilmar Baunsgaard	Prime Minister of Denmark; 3 September 1962 – 2 February 1968 and 11 October 1971 – 5 October 1972	Succeeded by Hilmar Baunsgaard and Anker Jørgensen
Party political offices
Preceded by Viggo Kampmann	Leader of the Danish Social Democrats; 1962–1972	Succeeded by Anker Jørgensen
