= Danish Social Liberal Party =

Political party in Denmark

Danish Social Liberal Party Radikale Venstre
- Abbreviation: RV; B (Note: Official party letter on voting ballot)
- Leader: Martin Lidegaard
- Chairman: Anne Heeager
- Founded: 21 May 1905; 121 years ago
- Split from: Venstre
- Headquarters: Christiansborg; 1240 København K, Denmark
- Newspaper: Radikal Politik
- Youth wing: Radikal Ungdom
- Membership (2022): ▼5,945
- Ideology: Social liberalism Green politics
- Political position: Centre to centre-left
- European affiliation: Alliance of Liberals and Democrats for Europe Party
- European Parliament group: Renew Europe
- International affiliation: Liberal International; Historical: Radical International
- Nordic affiliation: Centre Group
- Colours: Magenta (official); Green; Purple (customary)
- Folketing: 10 / 179 (6%)
- European Parliament: 1 / 15 (7%)
- Regions: 12 / 205
- Municipalities: 98 / 2,432
- Mayors: 1 / 98

Election symbol
- B

Website
- radikale.dk

The Danish Social Liberal Party (Danish: Radikale Venstre, RV, lit. 'Radical Left') is a social-liberal and green-liberal political party in Denmark. The party was founded as a split from the Venstre Reform Party in 1905. Historically, the centrist to centre-left party has played a central role in Danish politics and has supported governments on both sides of the political spectrum, as co-operation is a primary belief of the party. A pro-European party, it is a member of Liberal International and the ALDE, and has one MEP in the Renew Europe group in the European Parliament.

== History ==
=== 1905–1930s ===
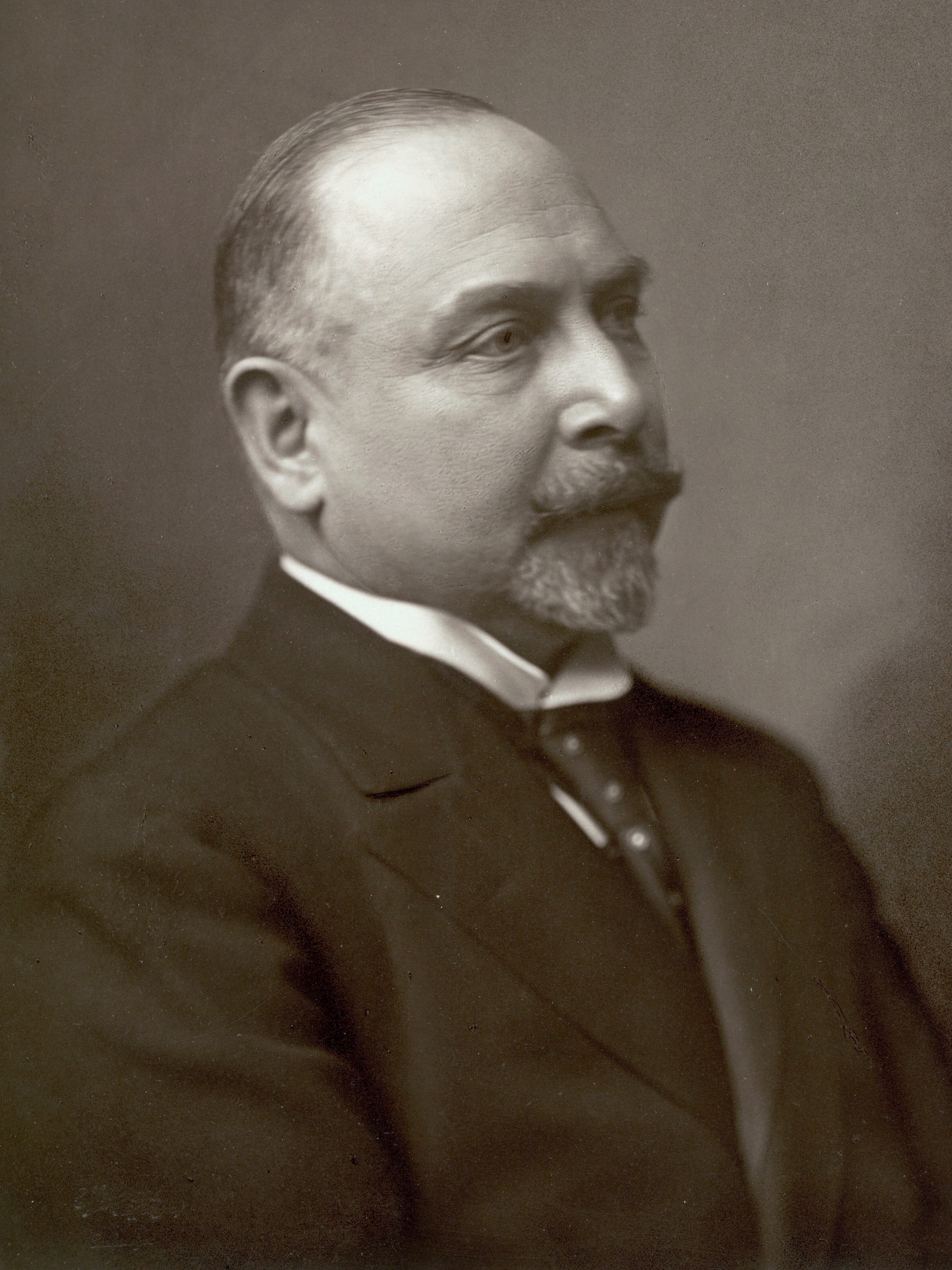
Carl Theodor Zahle served as the first Social Liberal Prime Minister from 1909 to 1910 and again from 1913 to 1920.

The party was founded in 1905 as a split from the Venstre. The initial impetus was the expulsion of Venstre's antimilitarist wing from the party in January 1905. The expelled members held a founding conference for the new party in Odense, on 21 May 1905. In addition to the differences over military spending, the social liberals also took a more positive view than Venstre towards measures that aimed to reduce social inequality. The party also became the political leg of the cultural radical movement. The party was cautiously open to aspects of the welfare state, and also advocated reforms to improve the position of smallholders, an important early group of supporters. The party's social-liberal ideals are said to have been inspired by the political economists Henry George and John Stuart Mill. Until 1936 the party was member of the International Entente of Radical and Similar Democratic Parties.

The first Social Liberal Cabinet was formed in 1909 with Carl Theodor Zahle serving as Prime Minister (1909–1910). From 1913 to 1920, Zahle led the second Social Liberal Cabinet with the Social Democrats serving as parliamentary support, keeping Denmark neutral during World War I. During the Great Depression of the 1930s, the party served as coalition partners along with the Social Democrats, led by Prime Minister Thorvald Stauning, and managed to lead the country through the recession by implementing far-reaching social reforms.

=== Post-World War II ===
After 1945, the party continued with its pragmatic ways, influencing governments either as coalition partner or as parliamentary support. From 1957 to 1964 they served as coalition partners in a Social Democratic-led government, while Hilmar Baunsgaard served as Prime Minister 1968–1971 in a coalition government with Venstre and the Conservative People's Party as partners. In the 1968 general elections the party reached an all-time high of 15% of the vote, while they only received 11.2% in the 1973 landslide election. During the 1980s, the party served either as parliamentary support or as coalition partner in various Conservative led governments. After an all-time low in the 1990 general elections (where the party only received 3.5% of the vote), the party once again started cooperating with the Social Democrats under leadership of Poul Nyrup Rasmussen, participating in a coalition government in 1993.

=== 2001–present ===
In the early 2000s, the political scene was marked by "bloc"-politics, with "blue bloc" being led by Venstre and "red bloc" by the Social Democrats. The Danish People's Party (DPP) overtook the Social Liberals' key position as prime candidate for parliamentary support. Furthermore, the DPP's anti-immigrant policies made the Social Liberals profile themselves as a progressive party being pro-globalisation, pro-EU and more tolerant towards refugees and immigrants. At the same time the party profiled itself on reforming the welfare system, campaigning to abolish "efterløn" and lower taxes. As such the party served to unite a modern social profile with a more liberal economic profile. This served to appeal the more well-educated urbanised parts of the country, resulting in 9.2% of the vote at the 2005 general elections.

In a 2006 press release, the party tried to mark themselves as once again being able to lead a government, doing away with the presumption of the party only being able to serve as government partner or parliamentary support. The strategy proved unpopular both among voters and within the party itself. On 7 May 2007 MP Naser Khader and MEP Anders Samuelsen left the party and formed the New Alliance, known today as the Liberal Alliance, along with Conservative MEP Gitte Seeberg. At a press conference on 15 June 2007, it was announced that MP Margrethe Vestager would take over leadership of the party after Marianne Jelved, and that the party would rethink its strategy. The party returned to its historical role as possible coalition partner and at the political centre of Danish politics. Vestager clarified during the run-up to the 2007 general election that her party would only be supporting a government led by the Social Democrats. Still, the party only won 5.1% of the vote.

At the subsequent 2011 general elections, the party support rose to 9.5% and regained eight seats to resume a total of 17. Together with the Social Democrats and the Socialist People's Party, they formed a three-way government coalition. On 31 August 2014, Prime Minister Helle Thorning-Schmidt nominated Margrethe Vestager as Denmark's EU Commissioner, resulting in her resignation as party leader. The party's parliamentary group subsequently elected Morten Østergaard as new leader. At the 2015 general elections, the party polled only 4.6% and lost nine of its 17 seats. Some of its voters had turned to the newly formed The Alternative, a Green political party founded by Uffe Elbæk, a former Social Liberal.

At the 2019 general elections, the party rose to 8.6% of the vote, doubling its number of seats to 16. Østergaard stated that he would support a government led by the Social Democrats only if changes were made to the previous government's strict immigration policies. On 7 October 2020, Morten Østergaard stepped down as leader of the Social Liberals following allegations from within the party of sexual harassment. Sofie Carsten Nielsen was elected as the new leader on the same day.

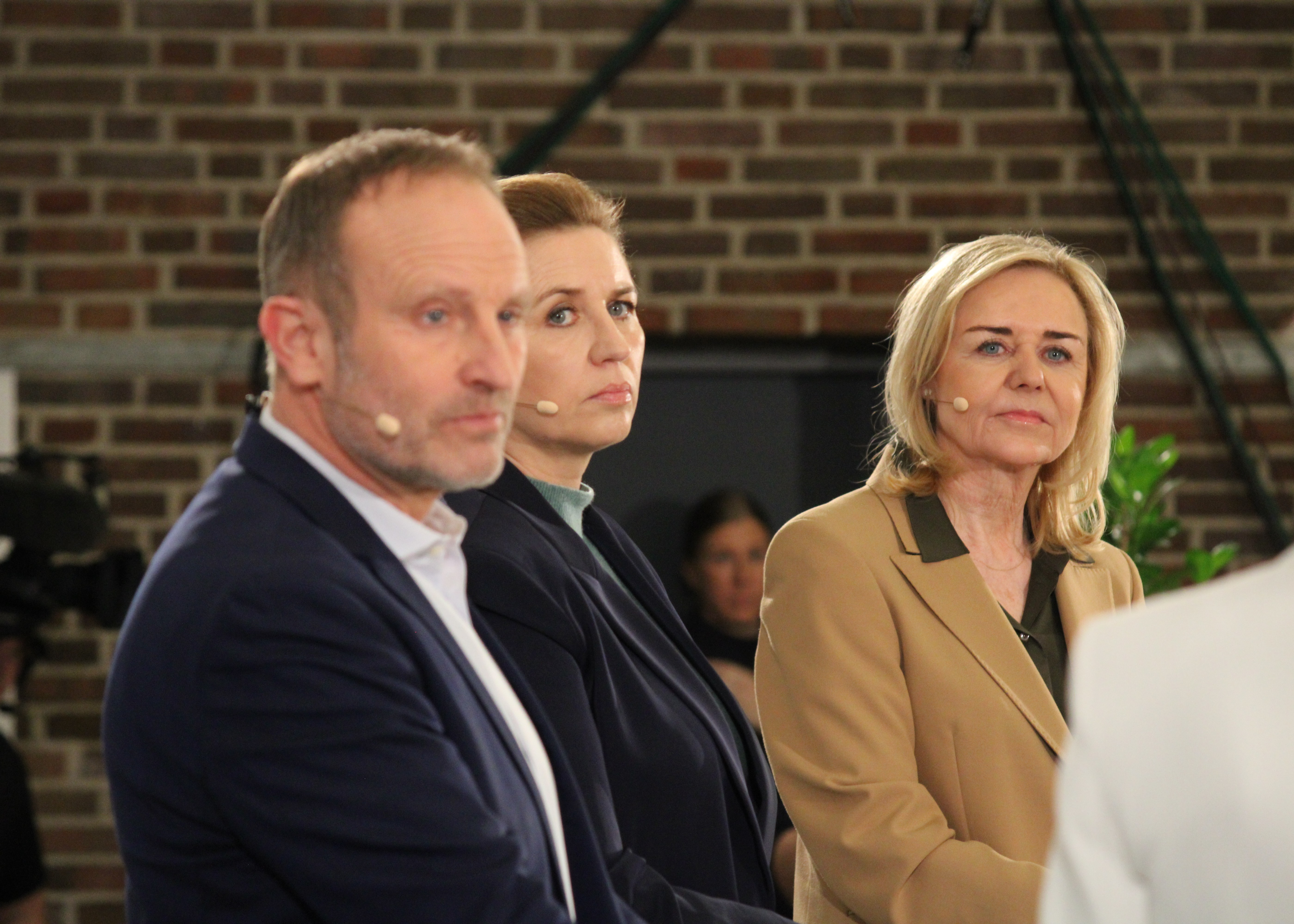
Lidegaard debating prime minister Mette Frederiksen and Conservative leader Mona Juul at the party's 2026 new year's meeting in Nyborg

Nielsen resigned on 2 November 2022, following the loss of nine of the party's 16 seats in the 2022 Danish general election. The Social Liberal Party had instigated the election by threatening a vote of no confidence against Mette Frederiksen's government in July 2022 due to the 2020 Danish mink cull. One day later, Martin Lidegaard became leader of the party.

== Relationship to other parties ==
The Danish Social Liberal Party has traditionally kept itself in the centre of the political scale. Since the early 1990s, though, it has primarily cooperated with the Social Democrats. Internationally, the party has cooperated with the Swedish Centre Party and Liberals, the Norwegian Venstre party, the Dutch Democrats 66, and the British Liberal Democrats.

== Etymology ==
The literal translation of the party's name Radical Left refers to its origin as the historically radical wing of its parent party Venstre (Left). In a modern context, this literal translation is somewhat misleading, as the party is considered to be centrist in the Danish political spectrum. The use of Left in the name of the party, as with the Norwegian party Venstre, is meant to refer to liberalism and not modern left-wing politics. The Danish Venstre was originally to the left of the conservative and aristocratic right-wing party Højre, whose name meant Right.

== Prominent members ==
=== Prime Ministers ===
- Carl Theodor Zahle, Prime Minister 1909–1910 and 1913–1920, (Minister of Justice 1929–1935)
- Erik Scavenius, Prime Minister 1942–1945 (de facto until 29 August 1943), (Foreign Minister 1909–1910, 1913–1920 and 1940–1943 de facto/–1945 de jure )
- Hilmar Baunsgaard, Prime Minister 1968–1971, (Trade Minister 1961–1964)

=== Other ministers ===
- Edvard Brandes, Finance Minister 1909–1910 and 1913–1920
- Christopher Krabbe, Defence Minister 1909–1910
- Peter Rochegune Munch, Minister of the Interior 1909–1910, Defence Minister 1913–1920, Foreign Minister 1929–1940
- Poul Christensen, Agriculture Minister 1909–1910
- Ove Rode, Minister of the Interior 1913–1920
- J. Hassing-Jørgensen, Minister for Public Works 1913–1920
- Kristjan Pedersen, Agriculture Minister 1913–1920
- Bertel Dahlgaard, Minister of the Interior 1929–1940, Minister for Economic Affairs and Minister for Nordic Co-operation 1957–1960
- Jørgen Jørgensen, Education Minister 1935–1940, 1942–1942, 1957–1960, Minister of the Interior 1942–1943
- A. M. Hansen, Education Minister 1945–1945
- Kjeld Philip, Trade Minister 1957–1960, Finance Minister 1960–1961, Minister for Economic Affairs 1961–1962
- Karl Skytte, Agriculture Minister 1957–1964
- A. C. Normann, Fishery Minister 1960–1964, Fishery Minister and Minister for Greenland 1968–1971
- Helge Larsen, Education Minister 1968–1971
- Lauge Dahlgaard, Labour Minister 1968–1971
- Jens Bilgrav-Nielsen, Energy Minister 1988–1990
- Kristen Helveg Petersen, Education Minister 1961–1964, Minister of Culture 1968–1971
- Niels Helveg Petersen, Minister for Economic Affairs 1988–1990, Foreign Minister 1993–2000
- Ole Vig Jensen, Minister of Culture 1988–1990, Education Minister, 1993–1998, Church Minister, 1996–1998
- Lone Dybkjær, Minister for the Environment 1988–1990
- Aase Olesen, Social Minister 1988–1990
- Ebbe Lundgaard, Minister of Culture 1996–1998
- Elsebeth Gerner Nielsen, Minister of Culture 1998–2001
- Marianne Jelved, Minister for Economic Affairs 1993–2001, Minister for Nordic Co-operation 1994–2001, Minister for Culture 2012–2015
- Margrethe Vestager, Education Minister 1998–2001, Church Minister 1998–2000, Minister for Economic and Interior Affairs 2011–2014
- Anita Bay Bundegaard, Minister for Development Cooperation 2000–2001
- Johannes Lebech, Church Minister 2000–2001
- Christian Friis Bach, Minister for Development Cooperation 2011–2013
- Uffe Elbæk, Minister of Culture 2011–2012
- Morten Østergaard, Minister for Research, Innovation and Higher Education 2011–2014, Minister for Taxation 2014–2014 Minister for Economic and Interior Affairs 2014–2015
- Martin Lidegaard, Minister for Climate and Energy 2011–2014, Minister for Foreign Affairs 2014–2015, Minister of Business and Competitiveness 2026-incumbent
- Manu Sareen, Minister for Equality, Church and Nordic Cooperation 2011–2014, Minister for Integration and Social Affairs 2014–2015
- Rasmus Helveg Petersen, Minister for Development Cooperation 2013–2014, Minister for Climate and Energy 2014–2015
- Sofie Carsten Nielsen, Minister for Research, Innovation and Higher Education 2014–2015
- Samira Nawa, Minister of Climate, Energy and Utilities 2026-incumbent
- Zenia Stampe, Minister of Culture 2026-incumbent

=== Political leaders ===
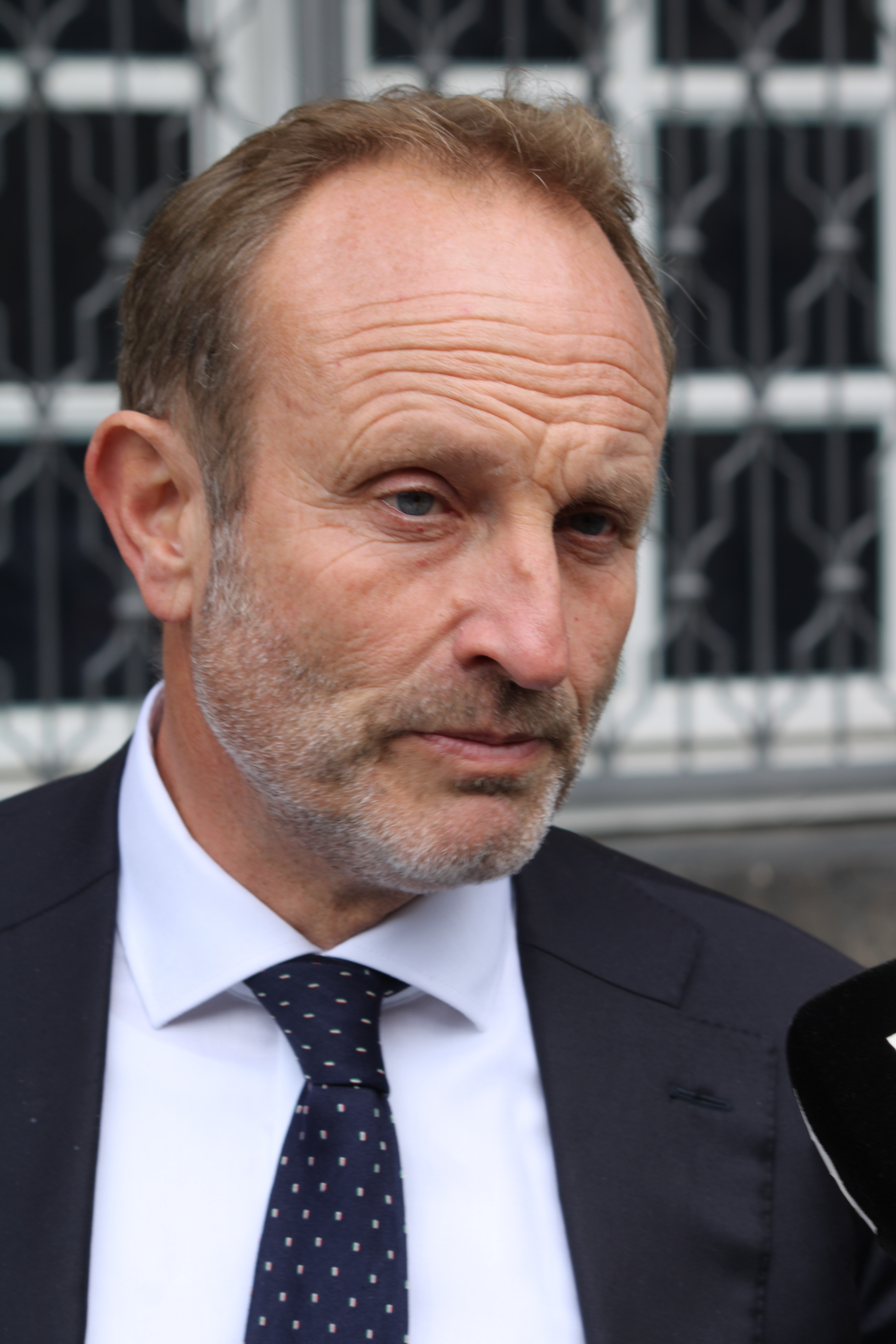
Martin Lidegaard, leader from 2022-

- 1905–1928: Carl Theodor Zahle
- 1928–1940: Peter Rochegune Munch
- 1940–1960: Jørgen Jørgensen
- 1960–1968: Karl Skytte
- 1968–1975: Hilmar Baunsgaard
- 1975–1978: Svend Haugaard
- 1978–1990: Niels Helveg Petersen
- 1990–2007: Marianne Jelved
- 2007–2014: Margrethe Vestager
- 2014–2020: Morten Østergaard
- 2020–2022: Sofie Carsten Nielsen
- 2022–present: Martin Lidegaard

== Election results ==
=== Parliament ===
Election	Votes	%	Seats	+/–	Government
1906	38,151	12.6 (#4)	15 / 114	▲9	Opposition
1909	50,305	15.5 (#4)	15 / 114	▲6	Opposition (1909)
1909	50,305	15.5 (#4)	15 / 114	▲6	Minority (1909–1910)
1910	64,884	18.6 (#3)	20 / 114	▲5	Opposition
1913	67,903	18.7 (#3)	32 / 114	▲11	Minority
1915	677	5.3 (#3)	31 / 140	▼1	Minority
1918	189,521	20.7 (#3)	32 / 140	▲1	Minority
1920 (Apr)	122,160	11.9 (#4)	17 / 140	▼15	Caretaker government
1920 (Jul)	109,931	11.5 (#4)	16 / 140	▼1	Opposition
1920 (Sep)	147,120	12.1 (#4)	18 / 149	▲2	Opposition
1924	166,476	13.0 (#4)	20 / 149	▲2	External support
1926	151,746	11.3 (#4)	16 / 149	▼4	External support
1929	151,746	10.7 (#4)	16 / 149	0	Coalition
1932	145,221	9.4 (#4)	14 / 149	▼2	Coalition
1935	151,507	9.2 (#4)	14 / 149	0	Coalition
1939	161,834	9.5 (#4)	14 / 149	0	Coalition
1943	175,179	8.7 (#4)	11 / 149	▼2	Coalition
1945	167,073	8.1 (#5)	11 / 149	▼2	External support
1947	144,206	6.9 (#4)	10 / 150	▼1	External support
1950	167,969	8.2 (#5)	12 / 151	▲2	Opposition
1953 (Apr)	178,942	8.6 (#4)	13 / 151	▲1	External support
1953 (Sep)	169,295	7.8 (#4)	14 / 179	▲1	External support
1957	179,822	7.8 (#4)	14 / 179	0	Coalition
1960	140,979	5.8 (#5)	11 / 179	▼3	Coalition
1964	139,702	5.3 (#5)	10 / 179	▼1	External support
1966	203,858	7.3 (#5)	13 / 179	▲3	Opposition
1968	427,304	15.0 (#4)	27 / 179	▲14	Coalition
1971	413,620	14.4 (#4)	27 / 179	0	External support
1973	343,718	11.2 (#4)	20 / 179	▼7	External support
1975	216,553	7.1 (#4)	13 / 179	▼7	External support
1977	113,330	3.6 (#8)	6 / 179	▼7	External support
1979	172,365	5.4 (#6)	10 / 179	▲4	External support
1981	160,053	5.1 (#7)	9 / 179	▼1	External support
1984	184,642	5.5 (#6)	10 / 179	▲1	External support
1987	209,086	6.2 (#5)	11 / 179	▲1	External support
1988	185,707	5.6 (#6)	10 / 179	▼1	Coalition
1990	114,888	3.5 (#7)	7 / 179	▼3	External support (1990–1993)
1990	114,888	3.5 (#7)	7 / 179	▼3	Coalition (1993–1994)
1994	152,701	4.6 (#6)	8 / 179	▲1	Coalition
1998	131,254	3.9 (#7)	7 / 179	▼1	Coalition
2001	179,023	5.2 (#6)	9 / 179	▲2	Opposition
2005	308,212	9.2 (#5)	17 / 179	▲8	Opposition
2007	177,161	5.1 (#6)	9 / 179	▼8	Opposition
2011	336,698	9.5 (#4)	17 / 179	▲8	Coalition
2015	160,672	4.6 (#7)	8 / 179	▼9	Opposition
2019	304,273	8.6 (#4)	16 / 179	▲8	External support
2022	133,931	3.8 (#9)	7 / 179	▼9	Opposition
2026	207,442	5.8 (#9)	10 / 179	▲3	Coalition

=== Local elections ===
Municipal elections

Year	Seats	
Year	No.	±
1925	1,069 / 11,289	
1929	1,237 / 11,329	▲168
1933	1,160 / 11,424	▼77
1937	1,078 / 11,425	▼82
1943	941 / 10,569	▼137
1946	870 / 11,488	▼71
1950	824 / 11,499	▼46
1954	764 / 11,505	▼60
1958	648 / 11,529	▼116
1962	501 / 11,414	▼147
1966	340 / 10,005	▼161
Municipal reform
1970	323 / 4,677	▼17
1974	311 / 4,735	▼12
1978	192 / 4,759	▼119
1981	187 / 4,769	▼5
1985	108 / 4,773	▼79
1989	73 / 4,737	▼35
1993	80 / 4,703	▲7
1997	87 / 4,685	▲7
2001	88 / 4,647	▲1
Municipal reform
2005	86 / 2,522	▼2
2009	50 / 2,468	▼36
2013	62 / 2,444	▲12
2017	80 / 2,432	▲18
2021	95 / 2,436	▲15
2025	97 / 2,436	▲2

Regional elections

Year	Seats	
Year	No.	±
1935	27 / 299	
1943	30 / 299	▲3
1946	27 / 299	▼3
1950	27 / 299	0
1954	31 / 299	▲4
1958	26 / 303	▼5
1962	21 / 301	▼5
1966	22 / 303	▲1
Municipal reform
1970	35 / 366	▲13
1974	34 / 370	▼1
1978	23 / 370	▼11
1981	24 / 370	▲1
1985	13 / 374	▼11
1989	10 / 374	▼3
1993	16 / 374	▲6
1997	15 / 374	▼1
2001	15 / 374	0
Municipal reform
2005	11 / 205	▼4
2009	7 / 205	▼4
2013	8 / 205	▲1
2017	8 / 205	0
2021	12 / 205	▲4
2025	8 / 134	▼4

Mayors

Year	Seats	
Year	No.	±
2005	1 / 98	
2009	0 / 98	▼1
2013	1 / 98	▲1
2017	1 / 98	0
2021	1 / 98	0
2025	1 / 98	0

=== European Parliament ===
Year	List leader	Votes	%	Seats	+/–	EP Group
1979	Unclear	56,944	3.26 (#10)	0 / 15	New	–
1984	Unclear	62,560	3.14 (#9)	0 / 15	0	–
1989	Unclear	50,196	2.81 (#8)	0 / 16	0	–
1994	Lone Dybkjær	176,480	8.48 (#6)	1 / 16	▲1	ELDR
1999	Lone Dybkjær	180,089	9.14 (#4)	1 / 16	0	ELDR
2004	Anders Samuelsen	120,473	6.36 (#6)	1 / 14	0	ALDE
2009	Sofie Carsten Nielsen	100,094	4.27 (#7)	0 / 13	▼1	–
2014	Morten Helveg Petersen	148,949	6.54 (#7)	1 / 13	▲1	ALDE
2019	Morten Helveg Petersen	277,929	10.07 (#4)	2 / 14	▲1	RE
2024	Sigrid Friis Frederiksen	173,355	7.08 (#6)	1 / 15	▼1	RE

== European representation ==
In the European Parliament, the Danish Social Liberal Party sits in the Renew Europe group with one MEP. In the European Committee of the regions, the Danish Social Liberal Party sits in the Renew Europe in the European Committee of the Regions group, with one full member for the 2025 – 2030 mandate. Hanne Roed is a member of the Bureau of the Renew Europe CoR Group.

== See also ==
- Contributions to liberal theory
- Liberal democracy
- Liberalism
- Liberalism and radicalism in Denmark
- Liberalism worldwide
- List of liberal parties
- List of political parties in Denmark
- Radikal Ungdom
