= List of heads of government of Denmark =

The Prime Minister of Denmark is the head of government of the Kingdom of Denmark and leader of the Cabinet. The Prime Minister is formally appointed by the Monarch, who is head of state.

The first four heads of government were titled premierminister (lit. 'prime minister'), between 1855 and 1920 the title was Konseilspræsident (lit. 'council president'). Since 1920, the title has been Danish: statsminister (lit. 'Minister of State').

Denmark's current prime minister is Mette Frederiksen representing the social democratic party Social Democrats. Mette Frederiksen took office on 27 June 2019, taking over the position from Lars Løkke Rasmussen, representing the liberal party Venstre. Frederiksen is also the second female prime minister in the history of the country, after fellow social democratic party colleague Helle Thorning-Schmidt who served from 2011 to 2015.

== List of prime ministers (1848–1855) ==
No.	Portrait	Name (birth–death)	Term of office			Party	Election	Cabinet coalition	Monarch (reign)
No.	Portrait	Name (birth–death)	Took office	Left office	Time in office	Party	Election	Cabinet coalition	Monarch (reign)
1		Adam Wilhelm Moltke (1785–1864)	22 March 1848	27 January 1852	3 years, 311 days	Independent	—	Moltke I H–N	Frederick VII (1848–1863)
1		Adam Wilhelm Moltke (1785–1864)	22 March 1848	27 January 1852	3 years, 311 days	Independent	—	Moltke II; H	Frederick VII (1848–1863)
1		Adam Wilhelm Moltke (1785–1864)	22 March 1848	27 January 1852	3 years, 311 days	Independent	1849	Moltke II; H	Frederick VII (1848–1863)
1		Adam Wilhelm Moltke (1785–1864)	22 March 1848	27 January 1852	3 years, 311 days	Independent	—	Moltke III; H	Frederick VII (1848–1863)
1		Adam Wilhelm Moltke (1785–1864)	22 March 1848	27 January 1852	3 years, 311 days	Independent	—	Moltke IV; H	Frederick VII (1848–1863)
2		Christian Albrecht Bluhme (1794–1866)	27 January 1852	21 April 1853	1 year, 84 days	Højre	1852	Bluhme I H–N	Frederick VII (1848–1863)
2		Christian Albrecht Bluhme (1794–1866)	27 January 1852	21 April 1853	1 year, 84 days	Højre	Feb. 1853	Bluhme I H–N	Frederick VII (1848–1863)
3		Anders Sandøe Ørsted (1778–1860)	21 April 1853	12 December 1854	1 year, 235 days	Independent	—	Ørsted; H	Frederick VII (1848–1863)
3		Anders Sandøe Ørsted (1778–1860)	21 April 1853	12 December 1854	1 year, 235 days	Independent	May 1853	Ørsted; H	Frederick VII (1848–1863)
4		Peter Georg Bang (1797–1861)	12 December 1854	12 October 1855	304 days	Independent	1854	Bang; N	Frederick VII (1848–1863)

== List of council presidents (1855–1918) ==
No.	Portrait	Name (birth–death)	Term of office			Party	Election	Cabinet coalition	Monarch (reign)
No.	Portrait	Name (birth–death)	Took office	Left office	Time in office	Party	Election	Cabinet coalition	Monarch (reign)
(4)		Peter Georg Bang (1797–1861)	12 October 1855	18 October 1856	1 year, 6 days	Independent	1855	Bang; N	Frederick VII (1848–1863)
5		Carl Christoffer Georg Andræ (1812–1893)	18 October 1856	13 May 1857	207 days	Independent	—	Andræ; H–N	Frederick VII (1848–1863)
6		Carl Christian Hall (1812–1888)	13 May 1857	2 December 1859	2 years, 203 days	National Liberal	—	Hall I N	Frederick VII (1848–1863)
6		Carl Christian Hall (1812–1888)	13 May 1857	2 December 1859	2 years, 203 days	National Liberal	1858	Hall I N	Frederick VII (1848–1863)
7		Carl Edvard Rotwitt (1812–1860)	2 December 1859	8 February 1860 #	69 days	Bondevennerne	—	Rotwitt; B	Frederick VII (1848–1863)
—		Carl Frederik Blixen-Finecke (1822–1873); Acting	8 February 1860	24 February 1860	16 days	Independent	—	Rotwitt; B	Frederick VII (1848–1863)
(6)		Carl Christian Hall (1812–1888)	24 February 1860	31 December 1863	3 years, 310 days	National Liberal	—	Hall II; N	Frederick VII (1848–1863)
(6)		Carl Christian Hall (1812–1888)	24 February 1860	31 December 1863	3 years, 310 days	National Liberal	1861	Hall II; N	Frederick VII (1848–1863)
(6)		Carl Christian Hall (1812–1888)	24 February 1860	31 December 1863	3 years, 310 days	National Liberal	1861	Hall II; N	Christian IX (1863–1906)
8		Ditlev Gothard Monrad (1811–1887)	31 December 1863	11 July 1864	193 days	National Liberal	—	Monrad; N	Christian IX (1863–1906)
(2)		Christian Albrecht Bluhme (1794–1866)	11 July 1864	6 November 1865	1 year, 118 days	Højre	1864	Bluhme II; H	Christian IX (1863–1906)
9		Christian Emil Krag-Juel-Vind-Frijs (1817–1896)	6 November 1865	28 May 1870	4 years, 203 days	National Landowners	—	Frijs; NG (until 1866); NG–N (from 1866)	Christian IX (1863–1906)
9		Christian Emil Krag-Juel-Vind-Frijs (1817–1896)	6 November 1865	28 May 1870	4 years, 203 days	National Landowners	Jun. 1866	Frijs; NG (until 1866); NG–N (from 1866)	Christian IX (1863–1906)
9		Christian Emil Krag-Juel-Vind-Frijs (1817–1896)	6 November 1865	28 May 1870	4 years, 203 days	National Landowners	Oct. 1866	Frijs; NG (until 1866); NG–N (from 1866)	Christian IX (1863–1906)
9		Christian Emil Krag-Juel-Vind-Frijs (1817–1896)	6 November 1865	28 May 1870	4 years, 203 days	National Landowners	1869	Frijs; NG (until 1866); NG–N (from 1866)	Christian IX (1863–1906)
10		Ludvig Holstein-Holsteinborg (1815–1892)	28 May 1870	14 July 1874	4 years, 47 days	Centre	—	Holstein-Holsteinborg; NG–N	Christian IX (1863–1906)
10		Ludvig Holstein-Holsteinborg (1815–1892)	28 May 1870	14 July 1874	4 years, 47 days	Centre	1872	Holstein-Holsteinborg; NG–N	Christian IX (1863–1906)
10		Ludvig Holstein-Holsteinborg (1815–1892)	28 May 1870	14 July 1874	4 years, 47 days	Centre	1873	Holstein-Holsteinborg; NG–N	Christian IX (1863–1906)
11		Christen Andreas Fonnesbech (1817–1880)	14 July 1874	11 June 1875	332 days	National Landowners	—	Fonnesbech; NG–N	Christian IX (1863–1906)
12		Jacob Brønnum Scavenius Estrup (1825–1913)	11 June 1875	7 August 1894	19 years, 57 days	National Landowners	—	Estrup; NG (until 1881); H (from 1881)	Christian IX (1863–1906)
12		Jacob Brønnum Scavenius Estrup (1825–1913)	11 June 1875	7 August 1894	19 years, 57 days	National Landowners	1876	Estrup; NG (until 1881); H (from 1881)	Christian IX (1863–1906)
12		Jacob Brønnum Scavenius Estrup (1825–1913)	11 June 1875	7 August 1894	19 years, 57 days	National Landowners	1879	Estrup; NG (until 1881); H (from 1881)	Christian IX (1863–1906)
12		Jacob Brønnum Scavenius Estrup (1825–1913)	11 June 1875	7 August 1894	19 years, 57 days	Højre	May 1881	Estrup; NG (until 1881); H (from 1881)	Christian IX (1863–1906)
12		Jacob Brønnum Scavenius Estrup (1825–1913)	11 June 1875	7 August 1894	19 years, 57 days	Højre	Jul. 1881	Estrup; NG (until 1881); H (from 1881)	Christian IX (1863–1906)
12		Jacob Brønnum Scavenius Estrup (1825–1913)	11 June 1875	7 August 1894	19 years, 57 days	Højre	1884	Estrup; NG (until 1881); H (from 1881)	Christian IX (1863–1906)
12		Jacob Brønnum Scavenius Estrup (1825–1913)	11 June 1875	7 August 1894	19 years, 57 days	Højre	1887	Estrup; NG (until 1881); H (from 1881)	Christian IX (1863–1906)
12		Jacob Brønnum Scavenius Estrup (1825–1913)	11 June 1875	7 August 1894	19 years, 57 days	Højre	1890	Estrup; NG (until 1881); H (from 1881)	Christian IX (1863–1906)
12		Jacob Brønnum Scavenius Estrup (1825–1913)	11 June 1875	7 August 1894	19 years, 57 days	Højre	1892	Estrup; NG (until 1881); H (from 1881)	Christian IX (1863–1906)
13		Tage Reedtz-Thott (1839–1923)	7 August 1894	23 May 1897	2 years, 289 days	Højre	—	Reedtz-Thott; H	Christian IX (1863–1906)
13		Tage Reedtz-Thott (1839–1923)	7 August 1894	23 May 1897	2 years, 289 days	Højre	1895	Reedtz-Thott; H	Christian IX (1863–1906)
14		Hugo Egmont Hørring (1842–1909)	23 May 1897	27 April 1900	2 years, 339 days	Højre	—	Hørring; H	Christian IX (1863–1906)
14		Hugo Egmont Hørring (1842–1909)	23 May 1897	27 April 1900	2 years, 339 days	Højre	1898	Hørring; H	Christian IX (1863–1906)
15		Hannibal Sehested (1842–1924)	27 April 1900	24 July 1901	1 year, 88 days	Højre	—	Sehested; H	Christian IX (1863–1906)
16		Johan Henrik Deuntzer (1845–1918)	24 July 1901	14 January 1905	3 years, 174 days	Venstre Reform	1901	Deuntzer; V	Christian IX (1863–1906)
16		Johan Henrik Deuntzer (1845–1918)	24 July 1901	14 January 1905	3 years, 174 days	Venstre Reform	1903	Deuntzer; V	Christian IX (1863–1906)
17		Jens Christian Christensen (1856–1930)	14 January 1905	12 October 1908	3 years, 192 days	Venstre Reform	—	Christensen I V	Christian IX (1863–1906)
17		Jens Christian Christensen (1856–1930)	14 January 1905	12 October 1908	3 years, 192 days	Venstre Reform	—	Christensen I V	Frederik VIII (1906–1912)
17		Jens Christian Christensen (1856–1930)	14 January 1905	12 October 1908	3 years, 192 days	Venstre Reform	1906	Christensen II; V	Frederik VIII (1906–1912)
18		Niels Neergaard (1854–1936)	12 October 1908	16 August 1909	308 days	Venstre Reform	—	Neergaard I V	Frederik VIII (1906–1912)
19		Ludvig Holstein-Ledreborg (1839–1912)	16 August 1909	28 October 1909	73 days	Venstre Reform	1909	Holstein-Ledreborg; V	Frederik VIII (1906–1912)
20		Carl Theodor Zahle (1866–1946)	28 October 1909	5 July 1910	250 days	Social Liberals	—	Zahle I RV	Frederik VIII (1906–1912)
21		Klaus Berntsen (1844–1927)	5 July 1910	21 June 1913	2 years, 351 days	Venstre	1910	Berntsen; V	Frederik VIII (1906–1912)
21		Klaus Berntsen (1844–1927)	5 July 1910	21 June 1913	2 years, 351 days	Venstre	1910	Berntsen; V	Christian X (1912–1947)
(20)		Carl Theodor Zahle (1866–1946)	21 June 1913	20 April 1918	4 years, 303 days	Social Liberals	1913	Zahle II; RV	Christian X (1912–1947)

== List of prime ministers (1918–present) ==
No.	Portrait	Name (birth–death)	Term of office			Party	Election	Cabinet coalition	Monarch (reign)
No.	Portrait	Name (birth–death)	Took office	Left office	Time in office	Party	Election	Cabinet coalition	Monarch (reign)
(20)		Carl Theodor Zahle (1866–1946)	21 April 1918	30 March 1920	1 year, 344 days	Social Liberals	—	Zahle II; RV	Christian X (1912–1947)
(20)		Carl Theodor Zahle (1866–1946)	21 April 1918	30 March 1920	1 year, 344 days	Social Liberals	1918	Zahle II; RV	Christian X (1912–1947)
22		Otto Liebe (1860–1929)	30 March 1920	5 April 1920	6 days	Independent	—	Liebe; Caretaker government	Christian X (1912–1947)
23		Michael Pedersen Friis (1857–1944)	5 April 1920	5 May 1920	30 days	Independent	—	Friis; Caretaker government	Christian X (1912–1947)
(18)		Niels Neergaard (1854–1936)	5 May 1920	23 April 1924	3 years, 354 days	Venstre	Apr. 1920	Neergaard II; V	Christian X (1912–1947)
(18)		Niels Neergaard (1854–1936)	5 May 1920	23 April 1924	3 years, 354 days	Venstre	Jul. 1920	Neergaard II; V	Christian X (1912–1947)
(18)		Niels Neergaard (1854–1936)	5 May 1920	23 April 1924	3 years, 354 days	Venstre	Sep. 1920	Neergaard II; V	Christian X (1912–1947)
(18)		Niels Neergaard (1854–1936)	5 May 1920	23 April 1924	3 years, 354 days	Venstre	—	Neergaard III; V	Christian X (1912–1947)
24		Thorvald Stauning (1873–1942)	23 April 1924	14 December 1926	2 years, 235 days	Social Democrats	1924	Stauning I S	Christian X (1912–1947)
25		Thomas Madsen-Mygdal (1876–1943)	14 December 1926	30 April 1929	2 years, 137 days	Venstre	1926	Madsen-Mygdal; V	Christian X (1912–1947)
(24)		Thorvald Stauning (1873–1942)	30 April 1929	3 May 1942 #	13 years, 3 days	Social Democrats	1929	Stauning II; S–RV	Christian X (1912–1947)
(24)		Thorvald Stauning (1873–1942)	30 April 1929	3 May 1942 #	13 years, 3 days	Social Democrats	1932	Stauning II; S–RV	Christian X (1912–1947)
(24)		Thorvald Stauning (1873–1942)	30 April 1929	3 May 1942 #	13 years, 3 days	Social Democrats	1935	Stauning III; S–RV	Christian X (1912–1947)
(24)		Thorvald Stauning (1873–1942)	30 April 1929	3 May 1942 #	13 years, 3 days	Social Democrats	1939	Stauning IV; S–RV	Christian X (1912–1947)
(24)		Thorvald Stauning (1873–1942)	30 April 1929	3 May 1942 #	13 years, 3 days	Social Democrats	—	Stauning V S–V–K–RV (national unity)	Christian X (1912–1947)
(24)		Thorvald Stauning (1873–1942)	30 April 1929	3 May 1942 #	13 years, 3 days	Social Democrats	—	Stauning VI; S–V–K–RV (national unity)	Christian X (1912–1947)
26		Vilhelm Buhl (1881–1954)	4 May 1942	9 November 1942	189 days	Social Democrats	—	Buhl I S–V–K–RV (national unity)	Christian X (1912–1947)
27		Erik Scavenius (1877–1962)	9 November 1942	29 August 1943	294 days	Independent	—	Scavenius; S–V–K–RV (national unity)	Christian X (1912–1947)
27		Erik Scavenius (1877–1962)	9 November 1942	29 August 1943	294 days	Independent	1943	Scavenius; S–V–K–RV (national unity)	Christian X (1912–1947)
No Danish government (29 August 1943 – 5 May 1945). (Note: On 29 August 1943, the Danish government resigned, refusing to grant further concessions to Nazi Germany. All government operations were assumed by the permanent secretaries of the individual departments, and this arrangement lasted until the Liberation of Denmark on 5 May 1945. Since King Christian X never accepted the resignation of the government, it existed de jure until a new cabinet was formed on 5 May 1945.) Office is assumed by the permanent secretary.									Christian X (1912–1947)
(26)		Vilhelm Buhl (1881–1954)	5 May 1945	7 November 1945	186 days	Social Democrats	—	Buhl II; S–V–K–RV–DS–DKP (national unity)	Christian X (1912–1947)
28		Knud Kristensen (1880–1962)	7 November 1945	13 November 1947	2 years, 6 days	Venstre	1945	Kristensen; V	Christian X (1912–1947)
28		Knud Kristensen (1880–1962)	7 November 1945	13 November 1947	2 years, 6 days	Venstre	1945	Kristensen; V	Frederik IX (1947–1972)
29		Hans Hedtoft (1903–1955)	13 November 1947	30 October 1950	2 years, 351 days	Social Democrats	1947	Hedtoft I S	Frederik IX (1947–1972)
29		Hans Hedtoft (1903–1955)	13 November 1947	30 October 1950	2 years, 351 days	Social Democrats	—	Hedtoft II; S	Frederik IX (1947–1972)
30		Erik Eriksen (1902–1972)	30 October 1950	30 September 1953	2 years, 335 days	Venstre	1950	Eriksen; V–K	Frederik IX (1947–1972)
30		Erik Eriksen (1902–1972)	30 October 1950	30 September 1953	2 years, 335 days	Venstre	Apr. 1953	Eriksen; V–K	Frederik IX (1947–1972)
(29)		Hans Hedtoft (1903–1955)	30 September 1953	29 January 1955 #	1 year, 122 days	Social Democrats	Sep. 1953	Hedtoft III; S	Frederik IX (1947–1972)
31		H. C. Hansen (1906–1960)	1 February 1955	19 February 1960 #	5 years, 18 days	Social Democrats	—	Hansen I S	Frederik IX (1947–1972)
31		H. C. Hansen (1906–1960)	1 February 1955	19 February 1960 #	5 years, 18 days	Social Democrats	1957	Hansen II; S–RV–Rfb	Frederik IX (1947–1972)
32		Viggo Kampmann (1910–1976)	21 February 1960	3 September 1962	2 years, 194 days	Social Democrats	—	Kampmann I S–RV–Rfb	Frederik IX (1947–1972)
32		Viggo Kampmann (1910–1976)	21 February 1960	3 September 1962	2 years, 194 days	Social Democrats	1960	Kampmann II; S–RV	Frederik IX (1947–1972)
33		Jens Otto Krag (1914–1978)	3 September 1962	2 February 1968	5 years, 152 days	Social Democrats	—	Krag I S–RV	Frederik IX (1947–1972)
33		Jens Otto Krag (1914–1978)	3 September 1962	2 February 1968	5 years, 152 days	Social Democrats	1964	Krag II; S	Frederik IX (1947–1972)
34		Hilmar Baunsgaard (1920–1989)	2 February 1968	11 October 1971	3 years, 251 days	Social Liberals	1968	Baunsgaard; RV–K–V	Frederik IX (1947–1972)
(33)		Jens Otto Krag (1914–1978)	11 October 1971	5 October 1972	360 days	Social Democrats	1971	Krag III; S	Frederik IX (1947–1972)
(33)		Jens Otto Krag (1914–1978)	11 October 1971	5 October 1972	360 days	Social Democrats	1971	Krag III; S	Margrethe II (1972–2024)
35		Anker Jørgensen (1922–2016)	5 October 1972	19 December 1973	1 year, 75 days	Social Democrats	—	Jørgensen I S	Margrethe II (1972–2024)
36		Poul Hartling (1914–2000)	19 December 1973	13 February 1975	1 year, 57 days	Venstre	1973	Hartling; V	Margrethe II (1972–2024)
(35)		Anker Jørgensen (1922–2016)	13 February 1975	10 September 1982	7 years, 209 days	Social Democrats	1975	Jørgensen II; S	Margrethe II (1972–2024)
(35)		Anker Jørgensen (1922–2016)	13 February 1975	10 September 1982	7 years, 209 days	Social Democrats	1977	Jørgensen II; S	Margrethe II (1972–2024)
(35)		Anker Jørgensen (1922–2016)	13 February 1975	10 September 1982	7 years, 209 days	Social Democrats	—	Jørgensen III; S–V	Margrethe II (1972–2024)
(35)		Anker Jørgensen (1922–2016)	13 February 1975	10 September 1982	7 years, 209 days	Social Democrats	1979	Jørgensen IV; S	Margrethe II (1972–2024)
(35)		Anker Jørgensen (1922–2016)	13 February 1975	10 September 1982	7 years, 209 days	Social Democrats	1981	Jørgensen V S	Margrethe II (1972–2024)
37		Poul Schlüter (1929–2021)	10 September 1982	25 January 1993	10 years, 137 days	Conservative	—	Schlüter I K–V–CD–KrF	Margrethe II (1972–2024)
37		Poul Schlüter (1929–2021)	10 September 1982	25 January 1993	10 years, 137 days	Conservative	1984	Schlüter I K–V–CD–KrF	Margrethe II (1972–2024)
37		Poul Schlüter (1929–2021)	10 September 1982	25 January 1993	10 years, 137 days	Conservative	1987	Schlüter II; K–V–CD–KrF	Margrethe II (1972–2024)
37		Poul Schlüter (1929–2021)	10 September 1982	25 January 1993	10 years, 137 days	Conservative	1988	Schlüter III; K–V–RV	Margrethe II (1972–2024)
37		Poul Schlüter (1929–2021)	10 September 1982	25 January 1993	10 years, 137 days	Conservative	1990	Schlüter IV; K–V	Margrethe II (1972–2024)
38		Poul Nyrup Rasmussen (born 1943)	25 January 1993	27 November 2001	8 years, 306 days	Social Democrats	—	P. N. Rasmussen I S–CD–RV–KrF	Margrethe II (1972–2024)
38		Poul Nyrup Rasmussen (born 1943)	25 January 1993	27 November 2001	8 years, 306 days	Social Democrats	1994	P. N. Rasmussen II; S–CD–RV	Margrethe II (1972–2024)
38		Poul Nyrup Rasmussen (born 1943)	25 January 1993	27 November 2001	8 years, 306 days	Social Democrats	—	P. N. Rasmussen III; S–RV	Margrethe II (1972–2024)
38		Poul Nyrup Rasmussen (born 1943)	25 January 1993	27 November 2001	8 years, 306 days	Social Democrats	1998	P. N. Rasmussen IV; S–RV	Margrethe II (1972–2024)
39		Anders Fogh Rasmussen (born 1953)	27 November 2001	5 April 2009	7 years, 129 days	Venstre	2001	A. F. Rasmussen I V–K	Margrethe II (1972–2024)
39		Anders Fogh Rasmussen (born 1953)	27 November 2001	5 April 2009	7 years, 129 days	Venstre	2005	A. F. Rasmussen II; V–K	Margrethe II (1972–2024)
39		Anders Fogh Rasmussen (born 1953)	27 November 2001	5 April 2009	7 years, 129 days	Venstre	2007	A. F. Rasmussen III; V–K	Margrethe II (1972–2024)
40		Lars Løkke Rasmussen (born 1964)	5 April 2009	3 October 2011	2 years, 181 days	Venstre	—	L. L. Rasmussen I V–K	Margrethe II (1972–2024)
41		Helle Thorning-Schmidt (born 1966)	3 October 2011	28 June 2015	3 years, 268 days	Social Democrats	2011	Thorning-Schmidt I S–RV–SF	Margrethe II (1972–2024)
41		Helle Thorning-Schmidt (born 1966)	3 October 2011	28 June 2015	3 years, 268 days	Social Democrats	—	Thorning-Schmidt II; S–RV	Margrethe II (1972–2024)
(40)		Lars Løkke Rasmussen (born 1964)	28 June 2015	27 June 2019	3 years, 364 days	Venstre	2015	L. L. Rasmussen II; V	Margrethe II (1972–2024)
(40)		Lars Løkke Rasmussen (born 1964)	28 June 2015	27 June 2019	3 years, 364 days	Venstre	—	L. L. Rasmussen III; V–LA–K	Margrethe II (1972–2024)
42		Mette Frederiksen (born 1977)	27 June 2019	Incumbent	7 years, 84 days	Social Democrats	2019	Frederiksen I S	Margrethe II (1972–2024)
42		Mette Frederiksen (born 1977)	27 June 2019	Incumbent	7 years, 84 days	Social Democrats	2022	Frederiksen II; S–V–M	Margrethe II (1972–2024)
42		Mette Frederiksen (born 1977)	27 June 2019	Incumbent	7 years, 84 days	Social Democrats	2022	Frederiksen II; S–V–M	Frederik X (since 2024)
42		Mette Frederiksen (born 1977)	27 June 2019	Incumbent	7 years, 84 days	Social Democrats	2026	Frederiksen III; S–SF–M–RV	Frederik X (since 2024)

== Timeline (1848–present) ==
This is a graphical lifespan timeline of prime ministers of Denmark. The prime ministers are listed in order of office, with prime ministers serving multiple premierships listed in order of their first.

== See also ==
- Politics of Denmark
- List of Danish monarchs
- List of prime ministers of Finland
- List of heads of government of Norway
- List of prime ministers of Sweden
