= List of elections in 1866 =

The following elections occurred in the year 1866.

- 1866 Belgian general election
- 1866 Chilean presidential election
- 1865-66 Colombian presidential election
- 1866 Costa Rican general election
- June 1866 Danish Folketing election
- October 1866 Danish Folketing election
- 1866 Honduran presidential election
- 1866 Liechtenstein general election
- 1866 Luxembourg general election
- 1866 New Zealand general election
- 1866 Peruvian general election

== North America ==
=== Canada ===
- 1866 New Brunswick general election

=== Caribbean ===
- 1866 Dominican Republic general election

=== United States ===
- 1866 New York state election
- 1866 United States elections

==== United States Senate ====
- 1866 United States Senate elections
- 1866 United States Senate election in Connecticut
- 1866 United States Senate election in Iowa
- 1866 United States Senate election in Ohio
- 1866 United States Senate election in Vermont

==== United States House of Representatives ====
- 1866 United States House of Representatives elections
- United States House of Representatives elections in California, 1866

==== United States lieutenant gubernatorial ====
- 1866 Connecticut lieutenant gubernatorial election
- 1866 Texas lieutenant gubernatorial election

==== United States gubernatorial ====
- 1866 Connecticut gubernatorial election
- 1866 Delaware gubernatorial election
- 1866 Kansas gubernatorial election
- 1866 Maine gubernatorial election
- 1866 Massachusetts gubernatorial election
- 1866 Michigan gubernatorial election
- 1866 Nebraska gubernatorial election
- 1866 Nevada gubernatorial election
- 1866 New Hampshire gubernatorial election
- 1866 New York gubernatorial election
- 1866 North Carolina gubernatorial election
- 1866 Oregon gubernatorial election
- 1866 Pennsylvania gubernatorial election
- 1866 Rhode Island gubernatorial election
- 1866 Texas gubernatorial election
- 1866 Vermont gubernatorial election
- 1866 West Virginia gubernatorial election

==== United States mayoral elections ====
- 1866 Boston mayoral election
- 1866 Manchester, New Hampshire, mayoral election
- 1866 New Orleans mayoral election
- 1866 Worcester, Massachusetts, mayoral election

== See also ==
- Category:1866 elections
