= 1865 in Denmark =

- Decades: 1840s; 1850s; 1860s; 1870s; 1880s
- See also: Other events of 1865; List of years in Denmark

The following lists events that happened during 1865 in Denmark.

== Incumbents ==
- Monarch – Christian IX
- Prime minister – Christian Albrecht Bluhme (until 6 November), C. E. Frijs

== Events ==
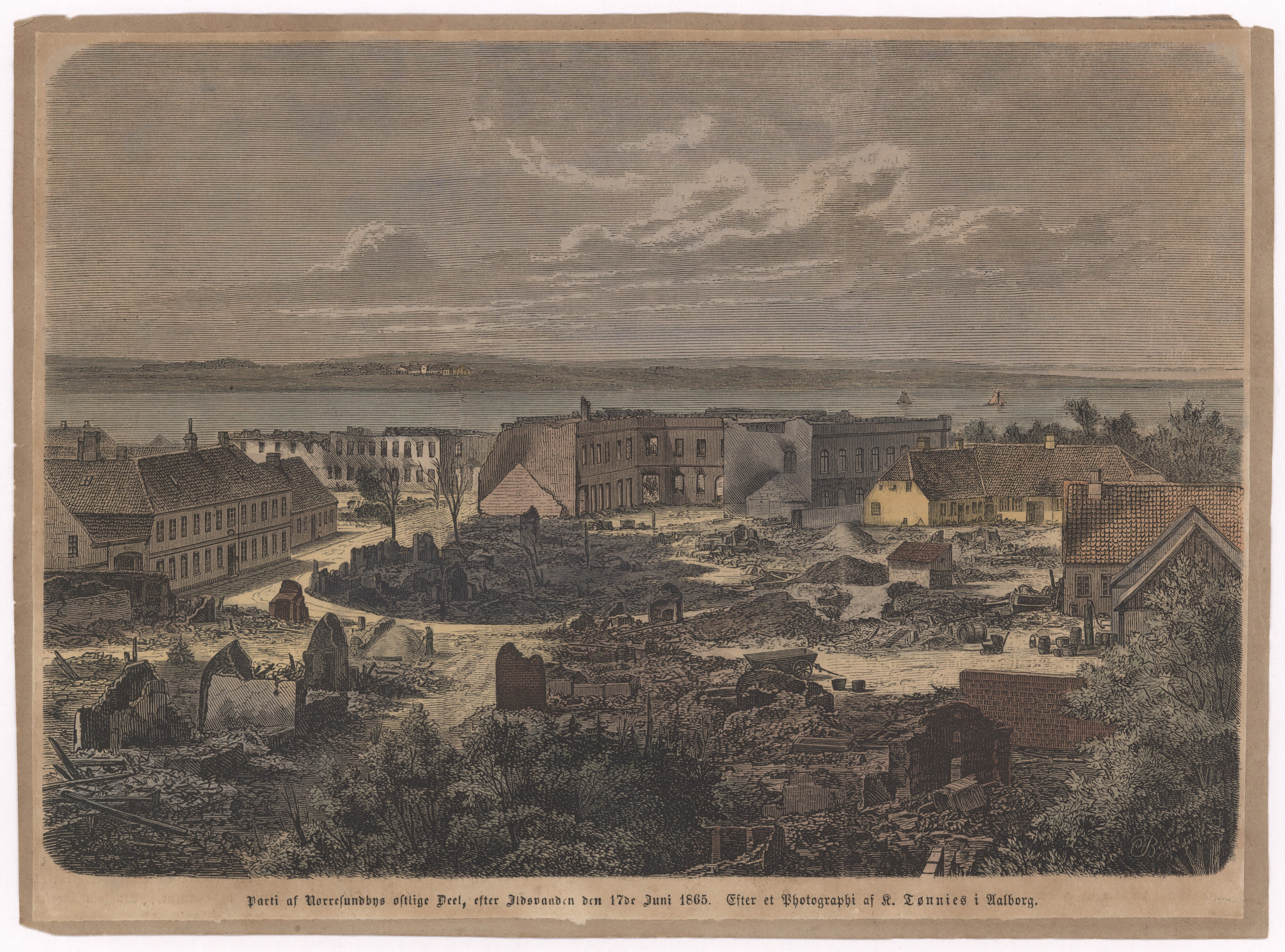
17 June: The eastern part of Nørresundby after the fire.

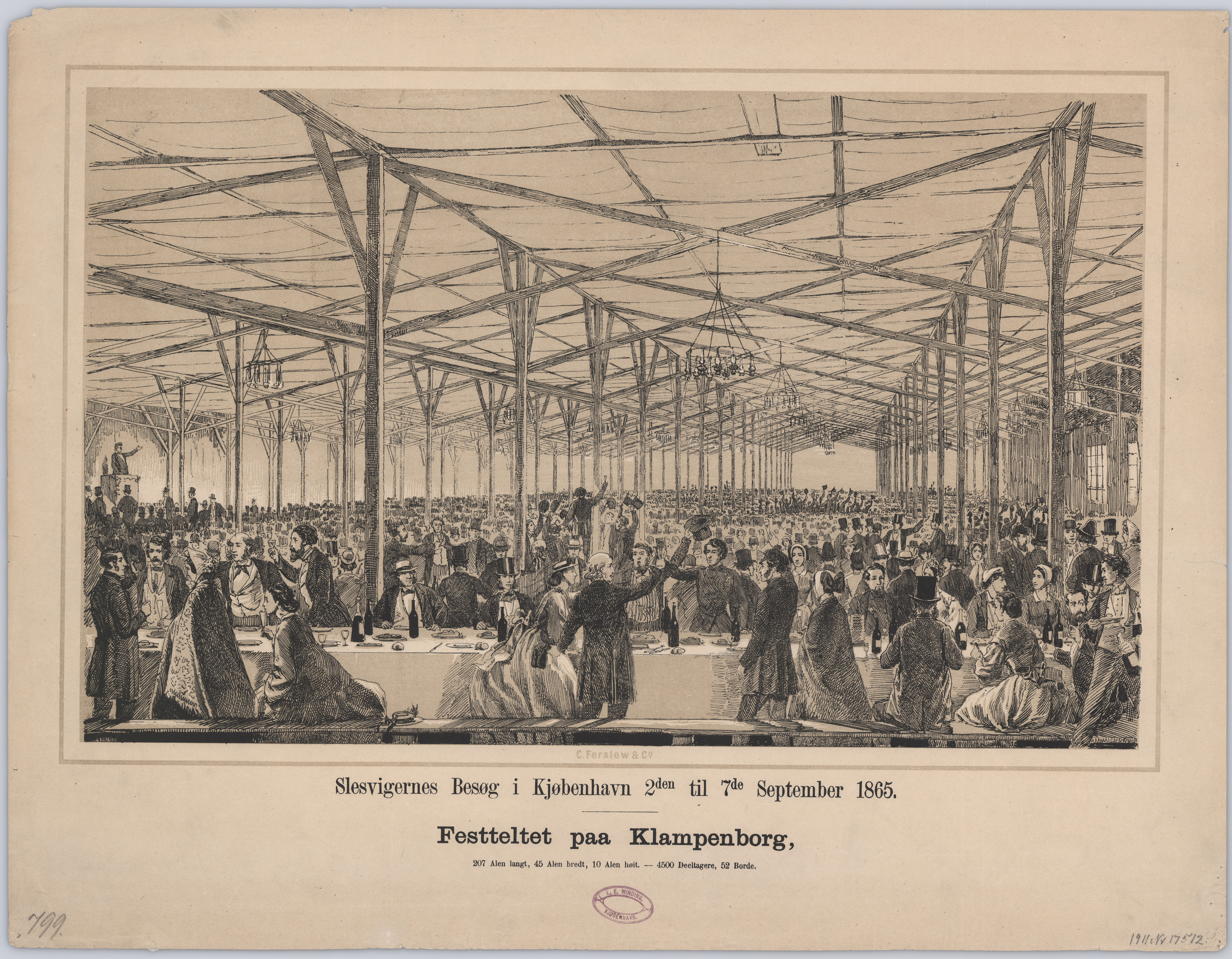
2–7 September: Festivities for the Sleswig deputation in a tent in Klampenborg.

- 6 April – Hans Christian Andersens romantic comedy When the Spaniards Were Here premiers at the Royal Danish Theatre.
- 30 May – The 1865 Danish Rigsrådets Folketing election is held.
- 31 May – 14 June – It is possible for the public to see Constantin Hansen's monumental painting of The Danish Constituent Assembly in Alfred Hage's home in the Harsdorff House on Kongens Nytorv in Copenhagen. The entrance fee goes to veterans of the Second Schleswig War.
- 17 June – A fire breaks out in the eastern part of Nørresundby and ends up destroying much of the town.
- 2–7 September – A deputation from Sleswig visits Copenhagen.
- 7 October – The railway line across the island of Funen from Nyborg by the Great Belt via Odense to Middelfart by the Little Belt openes.

== Births ==
- 9 June – Carl Nielsen, composer (died 1931)
- 13 September – Sophus Claussen, writer (died 1931)
- 16 August – Danish-American engineer (died 1952)
- 2 December – Niels Nielsen , mathematician (died 1931

=== Undated ===
- Pauline Schmidt, magician

== Deaths ==
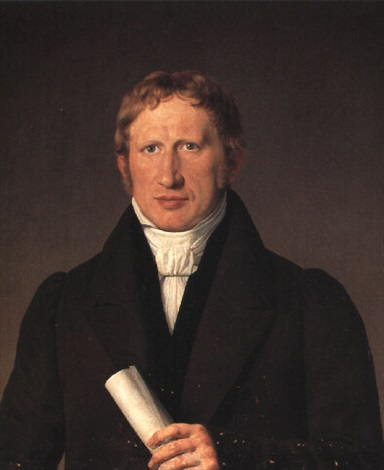
Ludvig Christian Brinck-Seidelin.

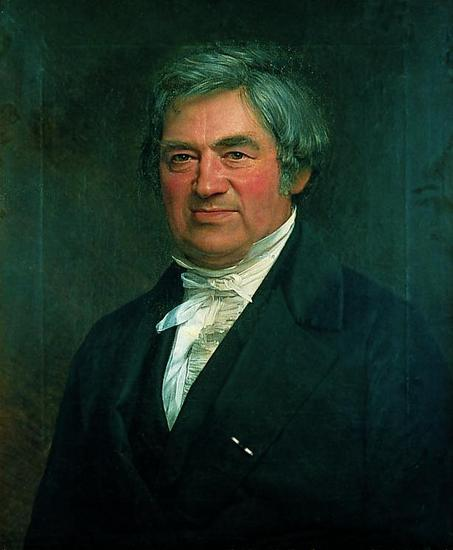
Christian Jürgensen Thomsen.

=== January–March ===
- 18 March – Christian Günther von Bernstorff, statesman and landowner (born 1769))

=== April–June ===
- 7 April
  - Carl Dahl, painter (born 1812)
  - Gustav Skram, railroad director (born 1802)
- 16 May – Anne Marie Mangor, cookbook writer (born 1781)
- 21 May – Christian Jürgensen Thomsen, archaeologist and arts administrator (born 1788)

=== July–September ===
- 14 July – Ludvig Christian Brinck-Seidelin, civil servant, landowner and politician (born 1787)
- 16 September – Christian de Meza, commander of the Danish Army (born 1792)

=== October–December ===
- 14 December – Johan Georg Forchhammer, mineralogist and geologist (born 1794)
- 30 December – Carl Edvard Marius Levy, physician (born 1810)
