= 1866 in Denmark =

- Decades: 1840s; 1850s; 1860s; 1870s; 1880s
- See also: Other events of 1866; List of years in Denmark

Events from the year 1866 in Denmark.

== Incumbents ==
- Monarch – Christian IX
- Prime minister – C. E. Frijs

== Events ==
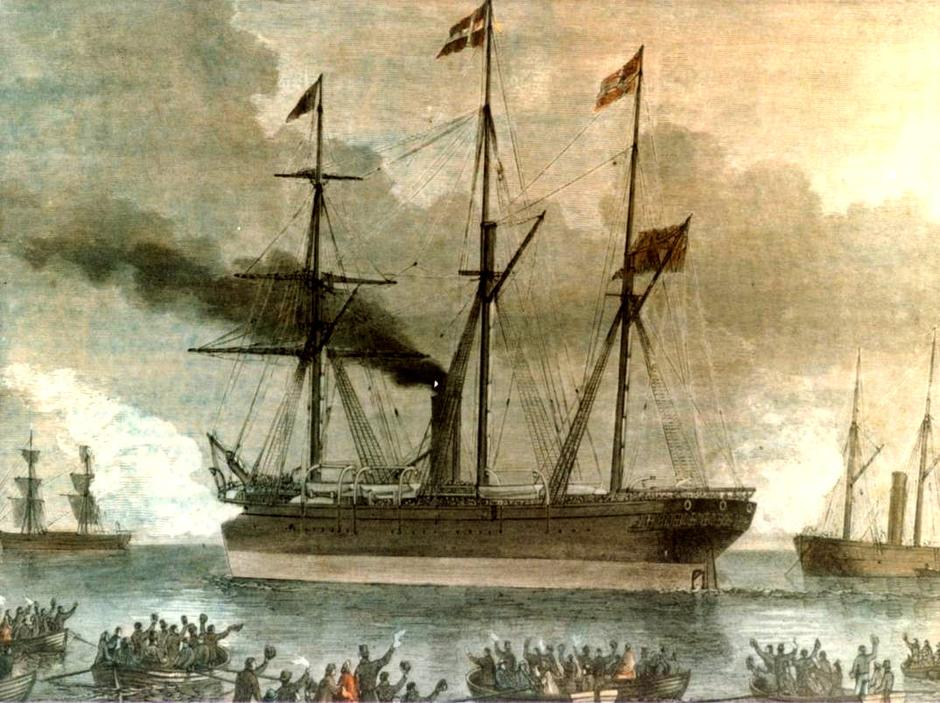
SS Ottawa, illustration by Carl Emil Baagøe in Illustreret Tidende

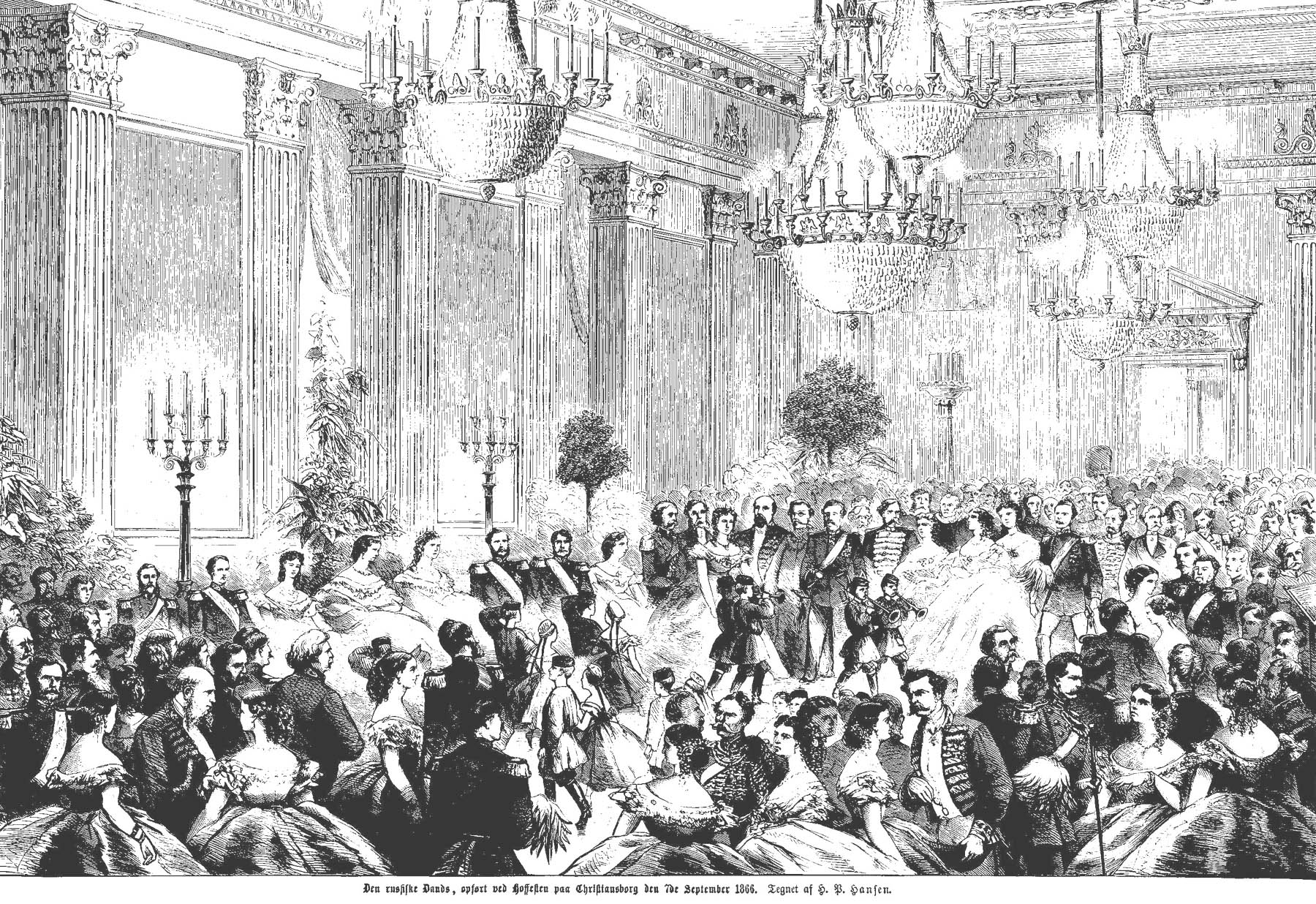
7 September: The "Russian Dance" at Christiansborg Palace

=== May ===
31 May – The Royal Horse Guards regiment is discontinued.

=== June ===
- 4 June – The June 1866 Danish Folketing election takes place.

=== August ===
- 22 August – SS Ottawa departs from Copenhagen as the first emigration ship between Copenhagen and New York City.

=== September ===
- 7 September – The engagement of Princess Dagmar and Grand Duke Alexander Alexandrovich is celebrated at the royal court at Christiansborg Palace.
- 22 September – Princess Dagmar leaves Copenhagen on board the steam ship Slesvig.

=== October ===
- 12 October – The October 1866 Danish Folketing election takes place.
- 20 October – Københavns Roklub is founded.

== Births ==
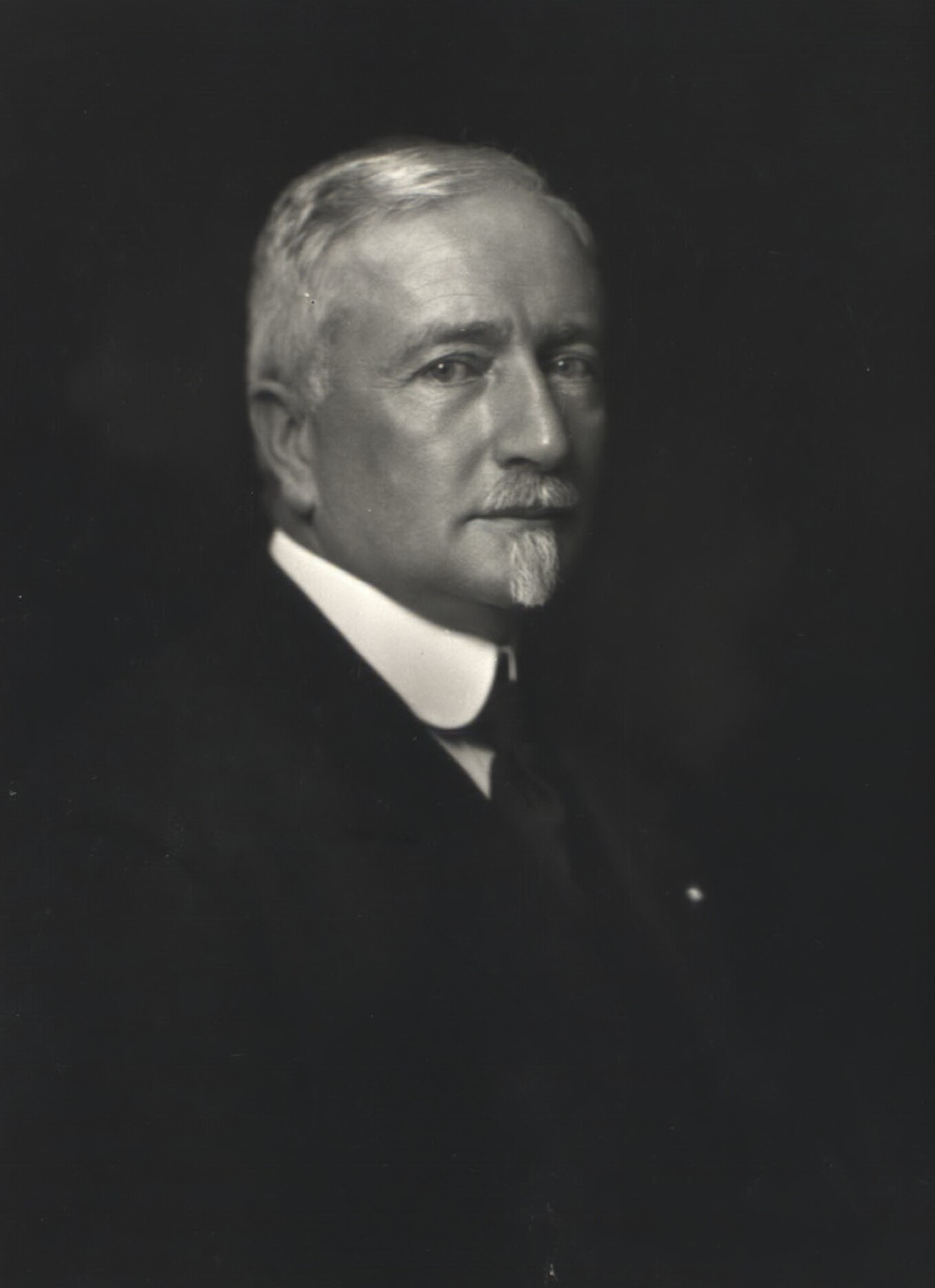
Peter Elfelt.

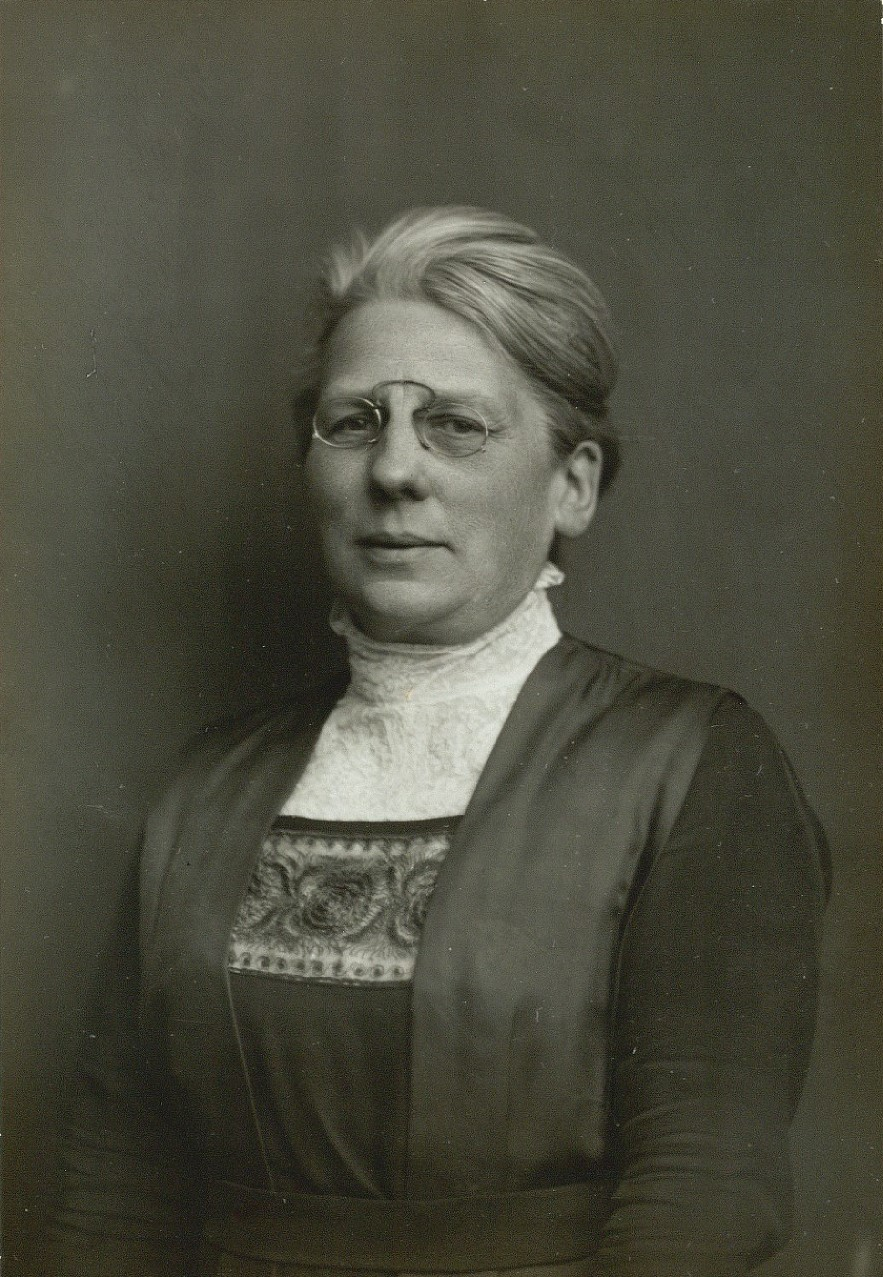
Nina Bang.

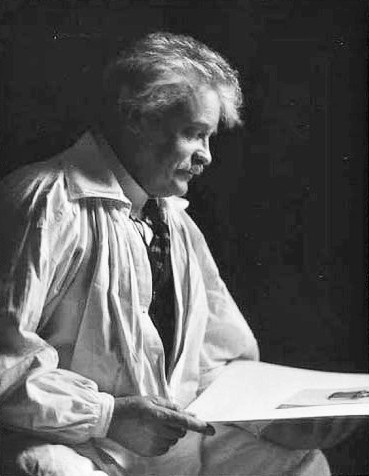
Georg Jensen.

=== January–March ===
- 1 January – Peter Elfelt, photographer (died 1931)
- 19 January – Carl Theodor Zahle, politician (died 1946)
- 16 February – Charles Brun, politician (died 1919)
- 25 February – Hans Peter Prior, industrialist (died 1936)

=== April–June ===
- 5 May – Thomas B. Thrige, industrialist (died 1938)
- 19 June – Sabine Helms, botanist (died 1929)

=== July–September ===
- 3 July – Albert Gottschalk, painter (died 1906)
- 15 July – Adolph Jensen, economist and statistician (died 1948)
- 31 August – Georg Jensen, goldsmith, designer (died 1935)
- 10 September – Jeppe Aakjær, writer (died 1930)

=== October–December ===
- 6 October – Nina Bang, politician (died 1928)
- 19 November – Georg Carl Amdrup, admiral, polar explorer (died 1947)
- 7 December – Magnus Bech-Olsen, wrestler and circus manager (died 1932)
- 18 December – Holger Nielsenm, fencer (died 1955)

== Deaths ==
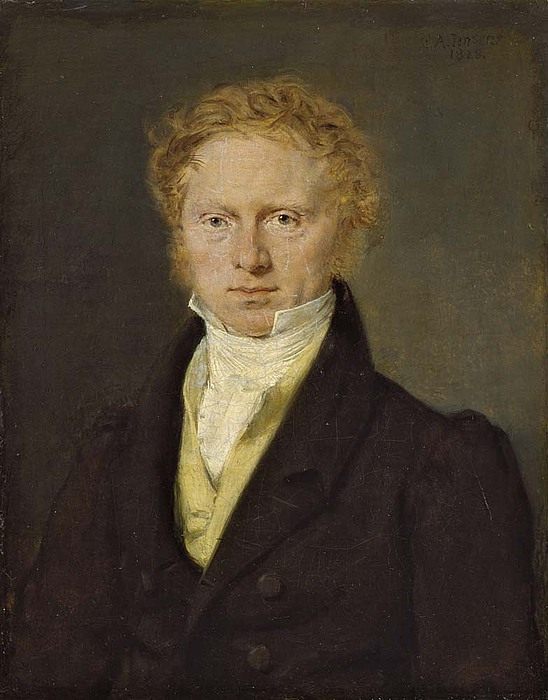
Hans Puggaard.

- 12 February – Henrik Kyhlm clockmaker (born 1793)
- 7 May – Benjamin Wolff, businessman, landowner and art collector (born 1790)
- 8 April – Hans Puggaard, businessman (born 1788)
- 6 November – Christian Albrecht Bluhme, politician, prime minister of Denmark (born 1794)
