= National Liberal Party (Denmark) =

National Liberal Party De Nationalliberale
- Leader: Leading figures: Orla Lehmann; Ditlev Gothard Monrad; Andreas Frederik Krieger; Carl Ploug; Carl Christian Hall
- Founded: 1842
- Dissolved: 1882
- Ideology: Liberalism; National liberalism Economic liberalism Constitutionalism

The National Liberal Party (Danish: De Nationalliberale) was a Danish political party or political movement from 1842 until 1882.

Often considered "the first Danish political party", the National Liberals gradually coalesced as the opposition against the Danish absolute monarchy. It was inspired by German movements and its base was merchants, industrialists, officials and especially students and academics. Among its leading figures were Orla Lehmann, Ditlev Gothard Monrad, Andreas Frederik Krieger, Carl Ploug and Carl Christian Hall but many elder businessmen and officials were leaders until the 1840s.

Its political goal was a constitutional government and free liberal economy, mixed with a strongly nationalist attitude towards the Germans, especially on the Schleswig-Holstein Question. It gradually grew stronger during the 1840s, and at the crisis and fall of absolutism 1848 it was the driving force. After a short participation in cabinet it went into opposition until 1854. From then until 1864 it was the leading Danish party, led especially by Hall. Its press became an indisputable political factor. Furthermore, it carried through some liberal economic reforms.

Its inability to handle the difficult Schleswig question led to Denmark's defeat in the Second Schleswig War (1864), which ended its power and also damaged the prestige of the party. In subsequent years it faded into the background. In 1866–75 it was the coalition partner of Højre, and soon most National Liberal veterans joined the conservative side. From about 1880 the party was quietly dissolved, split between the new combatants of the Constitutional Struggle of Denmark.

== Election results ==
=== Parliament (Folketing) ===
Date	Seats	
Date	#	±
1849	42 / 101	New
1852	47 / 101	▲5
1853 (feb)	40 / 101	▼7
1853 (may)	33 / 101	▼7
1854	78 / 101	▲45
1855	78 / 101	0
1858	20 / 101	▼58
1861	46 / 101	▲26
1864	40 / 101	▼6
1865	20 / 101	▼20
1866 (jun)	20 / 101	0
1866 (oct)	20 / 104	0
1869	27 / 104	▲7
1869	27 / 104	▲7
1872–1873	Did not run.	
1876	19 / 104	▲19
1879	10 / 104	▼9
