= 1852 Danish Folketing election =

Election for the lower house of Danish Parliament

Folketing elections were held in Denmark on 4 August 1852. Although the National Liberal Party became the largest party, Christian Albrecht Bluhme of the Højre party remained Prime Minister after the elections.

== Electoral system ==
The elections were held using first-past-the-post voting in single-member constituencies. Only 15% of the population was eligible to vote in the elections, with suffrage restricted to men over 30 who were not receiving poor relief (or who had not paid back any previous poor relief received), were not classed as "dependents" (those who were privately employed but did not have a household) and who had lived in their constituency for a certain length of time.

== Results ==
Map of the election, showing the elected members in each constituency.

| Party | Votes | % | Seats | +/– |
|---|---|---|---|---|
| National Liberal Party | | | 47 | +5 |
| Society of the Friends of Peasants | | | 40 | –5 |
| Højre | | | 9 | +1 |
| Others | | | 5 | –1 |
| Total | | | 101 | 0 |
| Registered voters/turnout | 211,002 | 26.6 | | |
Source: Skov, Nohlen & Stöver
