= Grundlovsforhør =

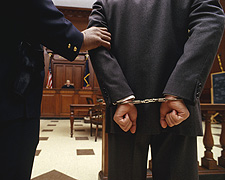
An arrested individual must be put before constitutional interrogation

Grundlovsforhør (English: Constitutional interrogation) is the Danish form of arraignment. It is a common legal procedure within the Kingdom of Denmark consisting of Denmark, Greenland, and the Faroe Islands where the Police have authority to detain a person suspected of a crime for up to 24 hours. Within 24 hours, the person must be arraigned if the police wish to maintain the detention. This rule is guaranteed in the Danish constitution and exists to protect citizens from arbitrary imprisonment. It was first introduced in Denmark's first Constitution of 1849, and has been preserved largely unchanged through all subsequent revisions of the constitution.

At such an arraignment, the defendant is brought before a judge, who must decide on the police's detention request. The arraignment can end in one of four ways:

1. The accused has the arrest maintained to give the police time to substantiate the charge. Maintenance can take place for up to 3x24 hours, after which the judge must decide on further custody.
2. The accused may be remanded in custody if the judge believes there is reasonable suspicion of the charge and if certain circumstances are met (section 762 of the Judicial Procedure Act). Typically, remand is made to prevent the suspect from obstructing the investigation.
3. The accused will be released if the judge does not believe that there is reasonable suspicion, or if the provisions of the Administration of Justice Act do not allow custody in the situation in question.
4. The case is decided as a confession case. Such a decision is called a summary judgment.

This procedure is secured in section 71, subsection 3 of the current version of the Constitution of Denmark. (Official English translation)

Any person who is taken into custody shall be brought before a judge within twenty-four hours. When the person taken into custody cannot be released immediately, the judge shall decide, in an order to be given as soon as possible and at the latest within three days, stating the grounds, whether the person taken into custody shall be committed to prison; and in cases in which he can be released on bail, the judge shall also determine the nature and amount of such bail. This provision may be disregarded by statute as far as Greenland is concerned, if for local considerations such departure may be deemed necessary.

— The Constitution of Denmark, section 71, subsection 3

Original Danish:

Enhver, der anholdes, skal inden 24 timer stilles for en dommer. Hvis den anholdte ikke straks kan sættes på fri fod, skal dommeren ved en af grunde ledsaget kendelse, der afsiges snarest muligt og senest inden tre dage, afgøre, om han skal fængsles, og, hvis han kan løslades mod sikkerhed, bestemme dennes art og størrelse. Denne bestemmelse kan for Grønlands vedkommende fraviges ved lov, forsåvidt dette efter de stedlige forhold må anses for påkrævet.

One additional effect of this constitutional right is that the traditional phrasing of a police arrest in Denmark includes a statement of the time of day as in "Time is 5:39 and you are under arrest", implying that they can only hold the arrestee until that time the next day
