= 1849 Danish Folketing election =

Election for the lower house of Danish Parliament

The first Folketing elections were held in Denmark on 4 December 1849. Adam Wilhelm Moltke remained Prime Minister after the elections.

== Electoral system ==
The elections were held using first-past-the-post voting in single-member constituencies. Only 14% of the population was eligible to vote in the elections, with suffrage restricted to men over 30 who were not receiving poor relief (and had paid back all previous poor relief received), were not classed as "dependents" (those who were privately employed but did not have a household) and who had lived in their constituency for a certain length of time.

== Results ==
Map of the election, showing the elected members in each constituency.

Party	Votes	%	Seats
Society of the Friends of Peasants			45
National Liberal Party			42
Højre			8
Others			6
Total			101
Registered voters/turnout	204,240	32.5	
Source: Skov, Nohlen & Stöver
