= 1920 Danish constitutional referendum =

6 September 1920

Results
Choice	Votes	%
Yes	614,227	96.91%
No	19,592	3.09%
Valid votes	633,819	98.92%
Invalid or blank votes	6,940	1.08%
Total votes	640,759	100.00%
Registered voters/turnout	1,291,745	49.6%

A constitutional referendum was held in Denmark on 6 September 1920. It was held in order to make changes to the constitution of Denmark from 1915 that had been made necessary to facilitate the reunification of Southern Jutland into the kingdom of Denmark. The changes were approved by 97% of voters, with a 50% turnout. A total of 614,227 of the 1,291,745 registered voters voted in favour, meaning that 48% of eligible voters had voted for the proposals, above the 45% required by the constitution.

== Results ==
Choice	Votes	%
For	614,227	96.91
Against	19,592	3.09
Total	633,819	100.00
Valid votes	633,819	98.92
Invalid/blank votes	6,940	1.08
Total votes	640,759	100.00
Registered voters/turnout	1,291,745	49.60
Source: Nohlen & Stöver
