= 1861 Danish Folketing election =

Election for the lower house of Danish Parliament

Folketing elections were held in Denmark on 14 June 1861. Carl Christian Hall remained Prime Minister following the elections.

== Electoral system ==
The elections were held using a form of first-past-the-post voting in single-member constituencies; Voting took place in public meetings by a show of hands. If the outcome of this stage was challenged, another vote was held amongst candidates who had not withdrawn. In the second vote, voters were checked against the electoral roll and were required to say clearly which candidate they wished to vote for.

Only 15% of the population was eligible to vote in the elections, with suffrage restricted to men over 30 who were not receiving poor relief (or who had not paid back any previous poor relief received), were not classed as "dependents" (those who were privately employed but did not have a household) and who had lived in their constituency for a certain length of time.

== Results ==
Map of the election, showing the elected members in each constituency.

Party	Votes	%	Seats	+/–
National Liberal Party			46	+26
Society of the Friends of Peasants–Left			34	–22
Højre			5	–11
Others			16	0
Total			101	0
Registered voters/turnout	236,080	32.7		
Source: Skov, Nohlen & Stöver
