= February 1853 Danish Folketing election =

Election for the lower house of Danish Parliament

Folketing elections were held in Denmark on 26 February 1853. Christian Albrecht Bluhme of the Højre party remained Prime Minister after the elections, but after the government failed to win a vote on who would succeed King Frederick VII on 18 April by the three-quarters majority necessary, the legislature was dissolved and early elections were held in May.

== Electoral system ==
The elections were held using first-past-the-post voting in single-member constituencies. Only 14% of the population was eligible to vote in the elections, with suffrage restricted to men over 30 who were not receiving poor relief (or who had not paid back any previous poor relief received), were not classed as "dependents" (those who were privately employed but did not have a household) and who had lived in their constituency for a certain length of time.

== Results ==
Map of the election, showing the elected members in each constituency.

Party	Votes	%	Seats	+/–
Højre–Society of the Friends of Peasants			52	+3
National Liberal Party			40	–7
Others			9	+4
Total			101	0
Registered voters/turnout	211,002	40.4		
Source: Skov, Nohlen & Stöver
