= May 1853 Danish Folketing election =

Election for the lower house of Danish Parliament

Folketing elections were held in Denmark on 27 May 1853. Although elections had been held in February, the legislature was dissolved after the government failed to win a vote on who would succeed King Frederick VII on 18 April, resulting in early elections. Anders Sandøe Ørsted remained Prime Minister after the elections.

== Electoral system ==
The elections were held using first-past-the-post voting in single-member constituencies. Only 14% of the population was eligible to vote in the elections, with suffrage restricted to men over 30 who were not receiving poor relief (or who had not paid back any previous poor relief received), were not classed as "dependents" (those who were privately employed but did not have a household) and who had lived in their constituency for a certain length of time.

== Results ==
Map of the election, showing the elected members in each constituency.

Party	Votes	%	Seats	+/–
Højre–Society of the Friends of Peasants			61	+9
National Liberal Party			33	–7
Others			7	-2
Total			101	0
Registered voters/turnout	217,250	25.4		
Source: Skov, Nohlen & Stöver
