= Judicial review in Denmark =

Power of courts to review laws

Judicial review is the procedure by which courts in Denmark assess whether laws are compatible with the Constitution of Denmark, and administrative acts are compatible with the law. The Constitution does not expressly authorise the courts to review statutes, but the courts have established this right by precedence. Constitutionality is usually decided in the Supreme Court, but can be decided at lower levels of the judiciary.

== History ==
As the Constitution does not mention whether the courts can overturn legislative acts as unconstitutional, it has been debated in Danish legal theory whether the courts are able to do this. However the courts have assumed this right which has been accepted by the government as well as Parliament.

There has been little debate whether the courts were able to examine whether the formal constitutional procedures connected to the creation of a law has been followed. The courts have done this in a few cases, but have never ruled a law unconstitutional due to non-compliance with formal procedure.

In 1912 the Supreme Court assumed that it had the power to try the constitutionality of tithe abolition laws. In 1921 the Supreme Court came close to declare a land reform law unconstitutional; and it was only because a judge changed his vote that the law was considered constitutional.

In 1971, the Supreme Court was close to declare a law unconstitutional. The law demanded that a foundation under the University of Copenhagen was to transfer its collection of Icelandic manuscripts and its capital to the University of Iceland, along with the foundation's capital. The foundation contested that this was violating the constitutional ban on expropriation without compensation. The Supreme Court ruled that the foundation was to transfer the manuscripts without compensation, but not its capital.

In a 1980 case concerning whether a law can ban private shipping companies from transporting goods to and from Greenland was heard. In reality there was only one company affected by the law, and the Eastern High Court ruled that the law expropriated the business of that shipping company and awarded the company a compensation.

The only case where a law was ruled unconstitutional is from 1999, where several named individual schools from the Tvind network was cut off from government funding. The law was passed because the schools were suspected of receiving funding based on forged numbers of students. To avoid a lot of lawsuits, a law was passed cutting the Tvind schools from government funding and barring them from suing the government over the lost funding. The Supreme Court declared this to be a violation of the separation of powers and declared the law unconstitutional.

== Procedure ==
As the Danish courts are formally only able to decide in concrete cases an unconstitutional law is technically still in force. However a court ruling that a law is unconstitutional means that authorities will not again try to apply the law as they would expect to be met with a lawsuit they are guaranteed to lose. There has been at least two cases on the constitutionality of Danish membership of the European Union.

Since the courts are only competent to rule in concrete disputes not everyone can sue the state for passing an unconstitutional law. To do this the plaintiff has to have a legal interest in the case. However in 1996 the Supreme Court ruled that a group of citizens had legal interest in suing the prime minister over the law on accession to the European Union. The Supreme Court has taken the stance that Denmark's relation to the European Union was affecting the entire population in many substantial areas and that every Danish citizen thus had legal interest in the constitutionality of the question.

Denmark has no specialised constitutional court and thus the question on the constitutionality of a law is to be contested before the ordinary courts. All courts are able to rule on the constitutionality of a law, but in practice such highly political cases would be appealed to the Supreme Court.

As for judicial review of acts of the administration rather than pieces of legislation, Article 63 of the Danish Constitution provides that the judiciary is entitled to try any question relating to the limits to the executive's powers. This is traditionally construed to mean that beyond the sphere of criminal procedure, unless otherwise provided for by legislation, the judiciary may try any question of fact and of law, whereas courts traditionally do not review discretion exercised by the administration. In certain areas, however, such as tax law, courts exercise a wider review, as well as in cases concerning just reparation for expropriation of property, as provided for by Article 73(3) of the Danish Constitution. Other areas where the standard of scrutiny may traditionally be less extensive include, inter alia, cases of royal prerogative, such as foreign policy actions of the executive.

== See also ==
- Case law § Nordic nations
- Constitutional law
- Courts of Denmark
- Judicial review in other countries
