= 1854 Danish Folketing election =

Election for the lower house of Danish Parliament

Folketing elections were held in Denmark on 1 December 1854. Following the elections, Peter Georg Bang became Prime Minister on 12 December.

== Electoral system ==
The elections were held using first-past-the-post voting in single-member constituencies. Only 14% of the population was eligible to vote in the elections, with suffrage restricted to men over 30 who were not receiving poor relief (additionally disqualifying those who had not paid back any previous poor relief received), were not classed as "dependents" (those who were privately employed but did not have a household) and who had lived in their constituency for a certain length of time.

== Results ==
Map of the election, showing the elected members in each constituency.

Party	Votes	%	Seats	+/–
National Liberal Party–Society of the Friends of Peasants			78	–
Højre			17	–
Others			6	–1
Total			101	0
Registered voters/turnout	218,329	20.3		
Source: Skov, Nohlen & Stöver
