= 1864 Danish Folketing election =

Election for the lower house of Danish Parliament

Folketing elections were held in Denmark on 7 June 1864. The National Liberal Party emerged as the largest faction, winning 40 of the 101 seats. Following the elections, Christian Albrecht Bluhme became Prime Minister on 7 July.

== Electoral system ==
The elections were held using first-past-the-post voting in single-member constituencies. Only 14% of the population was eligible to vote in the elections, with suffrage restricted to men over 30 who were not receiving poor relief (or who had not paid back any previous poor relief received), were not classed as "dependents" (those who were privately employed but did not have a household) and who had lived in their constituency for a certain length of time.

== Results ==
Party	Votes	%	Seats	+/–
National Liberal Party			40	–6
Society of the Friends of Peasants			39	+5
Højre			11	+6
Others			11	+2
Total			101	0
Registered voters/turnout	238,550	26.3		
Source: Skov, Nohlen & Stöver
