= 1866 Connecticut lieutenant gubernatorial election =

- April 2, 1866
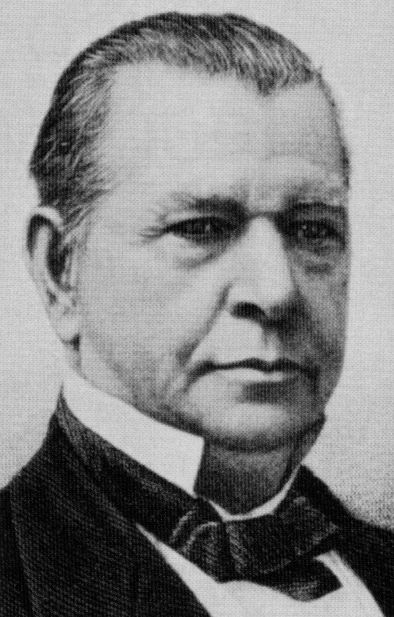

Nominee	Oliver Winchester	Ephraim H. Hyde
Party	Republican	Democratic
Popular vote	43,998	43,198
Percentage	50.45%	49.53%
Lieutenant Governor before election
Roger Averill
National Union
Elected Lieutenant Governor
Oliver Winchester
Republican

The 1866 Connecticut lieutenant gubernatorial election was held on April 2, 1866, to elect the lieutenant governor of Connecticut. Republican nominee Oliver Winchester won the election against Democratic nominee and former member of the Connecticut House of Representatives Ephraim H. Hyde.

== General election ==
On election day, April 2, 1866, Republican nominee Oliver Winchester won the election with 50.45% of the vote, thereby gaining Republican control over the office of lieutenant governor. Winchester was sworn in as the 52nd lieutenant governor of Connecticut on May 2, 1866.

=== Results ===
Connecticut lieutenant gubernatorial election, 1866
Party	Candidate	Votes	%
Republican	Oliver Winchester	43,998	50.45
Democratic	Ephraim H. Hyde	43,198	49.53
	Scattering	14	0.02
Total votes		87,210	100.00
Republican gain from National Union			
