= Pauline Schmidt =

Danish photographer (1865–1944)

Pauline Wilhelmine Rasmussen Schmidt

Pauline Wilhelmine Rasmussen Schmidt (1865–1944), was a professional Danish magician and photographer. She was one of the few female magicians in Scandinavia during the 19th century.

Schmidt performed magic shows in Sweden and Finland during the 1880s. In 1888, she married the Finnish photographer Niels Rasmussen and became his colleague in Tampere, Finland. Schmidt opened her own studio in 1914.

Pauline Schmidt is portrayed in the novel Pauline Wilhelmine – trollkonstnärinna (Pauline Wilhelmine – a female magician), by Elisabeth Sandelin (2013).
