= 1866 Nevada gubernatorial election =

- November 6, 1866
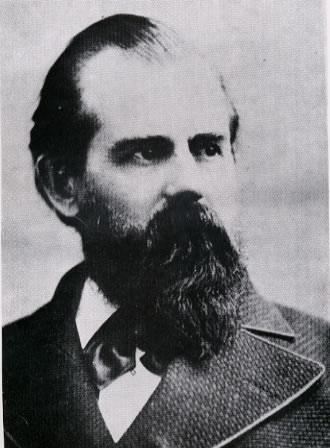

| Nominee | Henry G. Blasdel | John D. Winters |
| Party | Republican | Democratic |
| Popular vote | 5,125 | 4,105 |
| Percentage | 55.53% | 44.47% |
- County results Blasdel: 50–60% 60–70% 70–80% Winters: 50–60% No data/vote
Governor before election
Henry G. Blasdel
Republican
Elected Governor
Henry G. Blasdel
Republican

The 1866 Nevada gubernatorial election was held on November 6, 1866, to elect the governor of Nevada. The incumbent Republican Governor of Nevada Henry G. Blasdel won re-election against Democratic nominee John D. Winters.

== General election ==
On election day, November 6, 1866, incumbent Republican Governor of Nevada Henry G. Blasdel won the election by a margin of 1,020 votes against his opponent Democratic nominee John D. Winters, thereby retaining Republican control over the office of governor. Blasdel was sworn in for his second term on January 3, 1867.

=== Results ===
Nevada gubernatorial election, 1866
| Party | Candidate | Votes | % | ±% |
|---|---|---|---|---|
| Republican | Henry G. Blasdel (incumbent) | 5,125 | 55.53% | −4.47% |
| Democratic | John D. Winters | 4,105 | 44.47% | +4.47% |
| Majority | | 1,020 | 11.06% | |
| Total votes | | 9,230 | 100.00% | |
| Republican hold | | Swing | -8.94% | |

=== Results by county ===
| County | Henry G. Blasdel Republican | | John D. Winters Democratic | | Margin | | Total votes cast |
| County | # | % | # | % | # | % | Total votes cast |
|---|---|---|---|---|---|---|---|
| Churchill | 112 | 51.14 | 107 | 48.86 | 5 | 2.28 | 219 |
| Douglas | 273 | 79.59 | 70 | 20.41 | 203 | 59.18 | 343 |
| Esmeralda | 208 | 63.03 | 122 | 36.97 | 86 | 26.06 | 86 |
| Humboldt | 192 | 62.54 | 115 | 37.46 | 77 | 25.08 | 307 |
| Lander | 474 | 62.53 | 284 | 37.47 | 190 | 25.07 | 758 |
| Lyon | 780 | 50.72 | 758 | 49.28 | 22 | 1.43 | 1,538 |
| Nye | 281 | 53.32 | 246 | 46.68 | 35 | 6.64 | 527 |
| Ormsby | 460 | 62.25 | 279 | 37.75 | 181 | 24.49 | 739 |
| Storey | 1,717 | 52.01 | 1,584 | 47.99 | 133 | 4.03 | 3,301 |
| Washoe | 628 | 53.77 | 540 | 46.23 | 88 | 7.53 | 1,168 |
| Totals | 5,125 | 55.53% | 4,105 | 44.47% | 1,020 | 11.05% | 9,230 |

==== Counties that flipped from Democratic to Republican ====
- Churchill
