= 1865 Danish Rigsrådets Folketing election =

Elections to the Rigsrådets Folketing were held in Denmark on 30 May 1865. Christian Albrecht Bluhme remained Prime Minister after the elections, although only until November.

== Electoral system ==
The elections were held using first-past-the-post voting in single-member constituencies. Only 14% of the population was eligible to vote in the elections, with suffrage restricted to men over 30 who were not receiving poor relief (or who had not paid back any previous poor relief received), were not classed as "dependents" (those who were privately employed but did not have a household) and who had lived in their constituency for a certain length of time.

== Results ==
| Party | Votes | % | Seats |
|---|---|---|---|
| Mellem Party | | | 20 |
| National Left | | | 20 |
| National Liberal Party | | | 20 |
| People's Left | | | 17 |
| A.F. Tscherning Left | | | 15 |
| Højre | | | 4 |
| Others | | | 5 |
| Total | | | 101 |
| Registered voters/turnout | 244,264 | – | |
Source: Skov, Nohlen & Stöver
