= 1869 Danish Folketing election =

Election for the lower house of Danish Parliament

Folketing elections were held in Denmark on 22 September 1869. The Mellem Party emerged as the largest factions, winning 27 seats. Christian Emil Krag-Juel-Vind-Frijs remained Prime Minister.

== Electoral system ==
The elections were held using first-past-the-post voting in single-member constituencies. Only 15% of the population was eligible to vote in the elections, with suffrage restricted to men over 30 who were not receiving poor relief (or who had not paid back any previous poor relief received), were not classed as "dependents" (those who were privately employed but did not have a household) and who had lived in their constituency for a certain length of time.

== Results ==
Party	Votes	%	Seats	+/–
Mellem Party			27	+9
National Left			21	+1
People's Left			21	+3
A.F. Tscherning Left			15	–3
Højre			10	0
National Liberal Party			7	–13
Total			101	–3
Registered voters/turnout	262,131	30.2		
Source: Skov, Nohlen & Stöver
