= 1866 Dominican Republic general election =

General elections were held in the Dominican Republic in 1866. The president was directly elected for the first time, with José María Cabral receiving 87% of the vote.

== Results ==
=== President ===
Candidate	Votes	%
José María Cabral	4,389	86.96
Gregorio Luperón	356	7.05
Pedro Antonio Pimentel	140	2.77
Federico de Jesús García	60	1.19
Pedro Valverde y Lara	14	0.28
Eugenio Valerio	13	0.26
Tomás Bobadilla	9	0.18
Eugenio Miches	8	0.16
Manuel Rodríguez	7	0.14
José del Carmen Reynoso	4	0.08
Lorenzo Luperón	4	0.08
Eusebio Manzueta	4	0.08
Santiago Rodríguez	4	0.08
Juan de Jesús Salcedo	3	0.06
Juan Pablo Duarte	3	0.06
Ulises Francisco Espaillat	3	0.06
Benito Monción	3	0.06
Juan Esteban Aybar	2	0.04
José Cabrera	2	0.04
Francisco Espaillat	2	0.04
Melitón Valverde	2	0.04
Federico Aybar	1	0.02
Manuel María Castillo	1	0.02
Severo Goméz	1	0.02
José Antonio Hernández	1	0.02
Emeterio Henríquez	1	0.02
Juan Letan	1	0.02
Leonardo Márquez	1	0.02
Francisco Monclús	1	0.02
Emeterio Morel	1	0.02
N. L'Official	1	0.02
Domingo Daniel Pichardo	1	0.02
Pablo Pujols	1	0.02
Domingo de la Rocha	1	0.02
Manuel Rodríguez Objío	1	0.02
Marcos Trinidad	1	0.02
Total	5,047	100.00
Source: Campillo Pérez
