= Constitution of Denmark =

Fundamental law of the Realm of Denmark

Constitutional Act of the Kingdom of Denmark
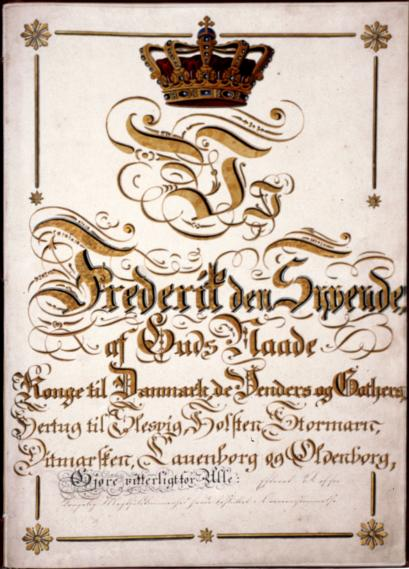
- Front page of the first constitution from 1849

Overview
- Original title: Danmarks Riges Grundlov
- Jurisdiction: The Danish Realm (Denmark, Greenland and the Faroe Islands)
- Ratified: 25 May 1849 (first); 28 May 1953 (current)
- Date effective: 5 June 1849 (first); 5 June 1953 (current)
- System: Constitutional monarchy

Government structure
- Branches: Three (executive, legislature and judiciary)
- Head of state: Monarch of Denmark
- Chambers: Unicameral (Folketing)
- Executive: Cabinet responsible to parliament
- Judiciary: Supreme Court and others
- Author: Constitutional Assembly of the Realm
- Signatories: Frederik VII (first); Frederik IX (current)
- Supersedes: King's Law (Lex Regia)

Full text
- Constitution of Denmark at Wikisource
- Danmarks Riges Grundlov at Danish Wikisource

The Constitutional Act of the Realm of Denmark (Danish: Danmarks Riges Grundlov), also known as the Constitutional Act of the Kingdom of Denmark, or simply the Constitution (Danish: Grundloven, Faroese: Grundlógin, Greenlandic: Tunngaviusumik inatsit), is the constitution of the Kingdom of Denmark, applying equally in the Realm of Denmark: Denmark proper, Greenland and the Faroe Islands. The first democratic constitution was adopted in 1849, replacing the 1665 absolutist constitution. The current constitution is from 1953. The Constitutional Act has been changed a few times. The wording is general enough to still apply today.

The constitution defines Denmark as a constitutional monarchy, governed through a parliamentary system. It creates separations of power between the Folketing, which enact laws, the government, which implements them, and the courts, which makes judgment about them. In addition it gives a number of fundamental rights to people in Denmark, including freedom of speech, freedom of religion, freedom of association, and freedom of assembly. The constitution applies to all persons in Denmark, not just Danish citizens.

Its adoption in 1849 ended an absolute monarchy and introduced democracy. Denmark celebrates the adoption of the Constitution on 5 June—the date in which the first Constitution was ratified—every year as Constitution Day (Danish: Grundlovsdag).

The main principle of the Constitutional Act was to limit the King's power (section 2). It creates a comparatively weak constitutional monarch who is dependent on Ministers for advice and Parliament to draft and pass legislation. The Constitution of 1849 established a bicameral parliament, the Rigsdag, consisting of the Landsting and the Folketing. The most significant change in the Constitution of 1953 was the abolishment of the Landsting, leaving the unicameral Folketing. It also enshrined fundamental civil rights, which remain in the current constitution: such as habeas corpus (section 71), private property rights (section 72) and freedom of speech (section 77).

The Danish Parliament (Folketinget) cannot make any laws which may be repugnant or contrary to the Constitutional Act. While Denmark has no constitutional court, laws can be declared unconstitutional and rendered void by the Supreme Court of Denmark.

Changes to the Act must be passed by the Folketing in two consecutive parliamentary terms and then approved by the electorate through a national referendum.

== History ==
=== Background ===
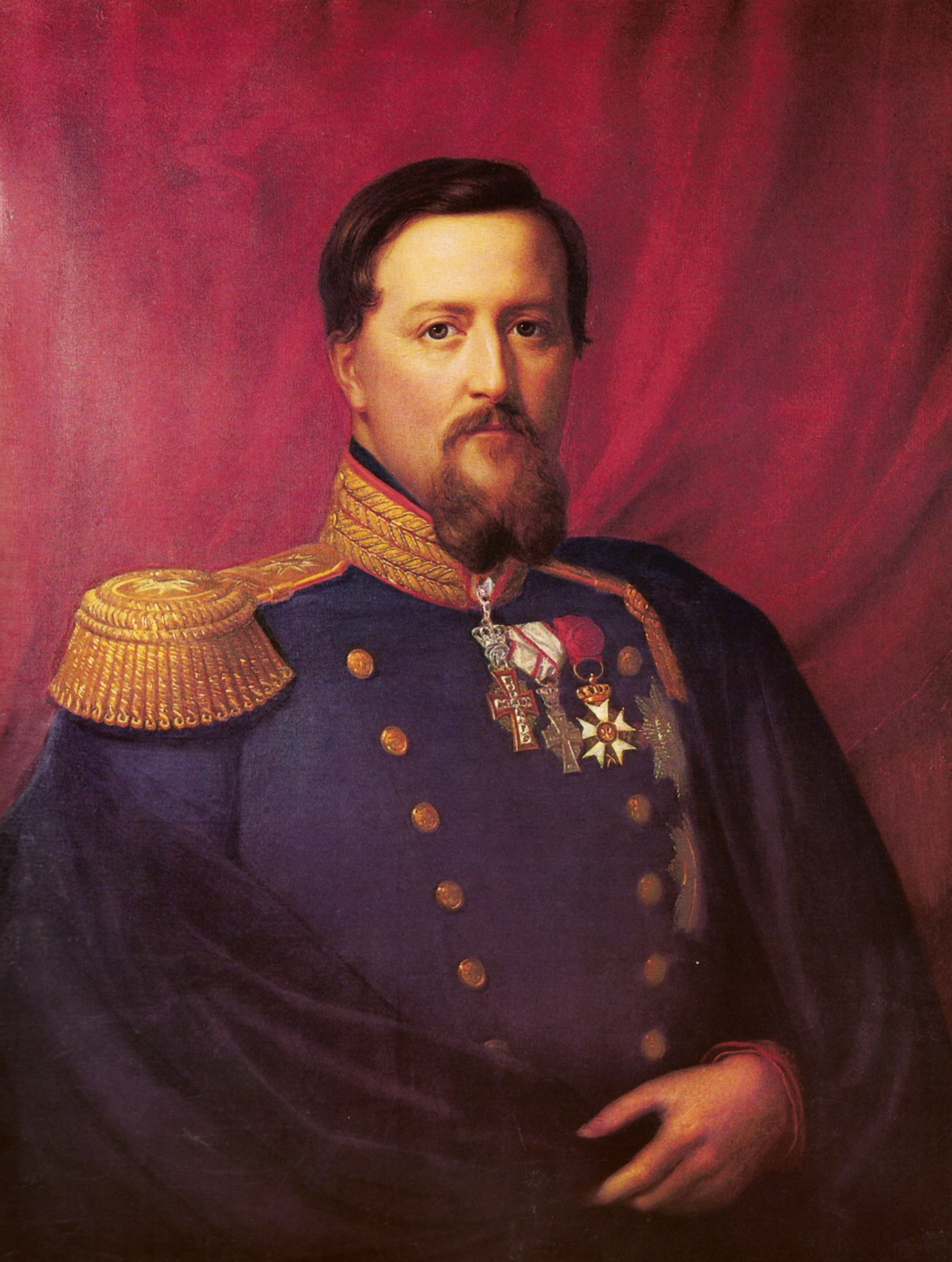
Frederick VII, the last king of Denmark to rule as an absolute monarch.

During the late Middle Ages and the renaissance, the power of the king was tempered by a håndfæstning, a coronation charter each king had to sign before being accepted as king by the nobility. This tradition was abandoned in 1665 when King Frederick III of Denmark managed to establish a hereditary absolute monarchy by Lex Regia (The Law of The King, Danish: Kongeloven). This was Europe's only formal absolutist constitution. Under Lex Regia, absolute power was inherited for almost 200 years.

In the beginning of the 19th century, there was a growing democratic movement in Denmark and King Frederick VI only made some small concessions, such as creation of Consultative Estate Assemblies (Danish: Rådgivende Stænderforsamlinger) in 1834. But these only served to help the political movements, of which the National Liberals and the Friends of Peasants were the forerunners. When Christian VIII became king in 1839, he continued the political line of only making small democratic concessions, while upholding the absolute monarchy.

At this time Denmark was in a personal union between kingdom of Denmark and the duchies of Schleswig, Holstein, and Lauenburg called The Unitary State (Danish: Helstaten), but the Schleswig-Holstein question was causing tension. Under the slogan Denmark to the Eider, the National Liberals campaigned for Schleswig to become an integral part of Denmark, while separating Holstein and Lauenburg from Denmark. Holstein and Lauenburg were then part of the German Confederation, while Schleswig was not. On the other side, German nationalists in Schleswig were keen to keep Schleswig and Holstein together, and wanted Schleswig to join the German Confederation. Christian VIII had reached the conclusion that, should the Unitary State survive, a constitution covering both Denmark, Schleswig and Holstein was necessary. Before his death in January 1848, he advised his heir Frederick VII to create such a constitution.

In March 1848 following a series of European revolutions, the Schleswig-Holstein question became increasingly tense. Following an ultimatum from Schleswig and Holstein, political pressure from the National Liberals intensified, and Frederick VII replaced the sitting government with the March Cabinet, where four leaders of the Friends of Peasants and the National Liberals served, among those D.G. Monrad and Orla Lehmann, both National Liberals. The ultimatum from Schleswig and Holstein was rejected, and the First Schleswig War started.

=== Drafting and signing of the first constitution (1849) ===
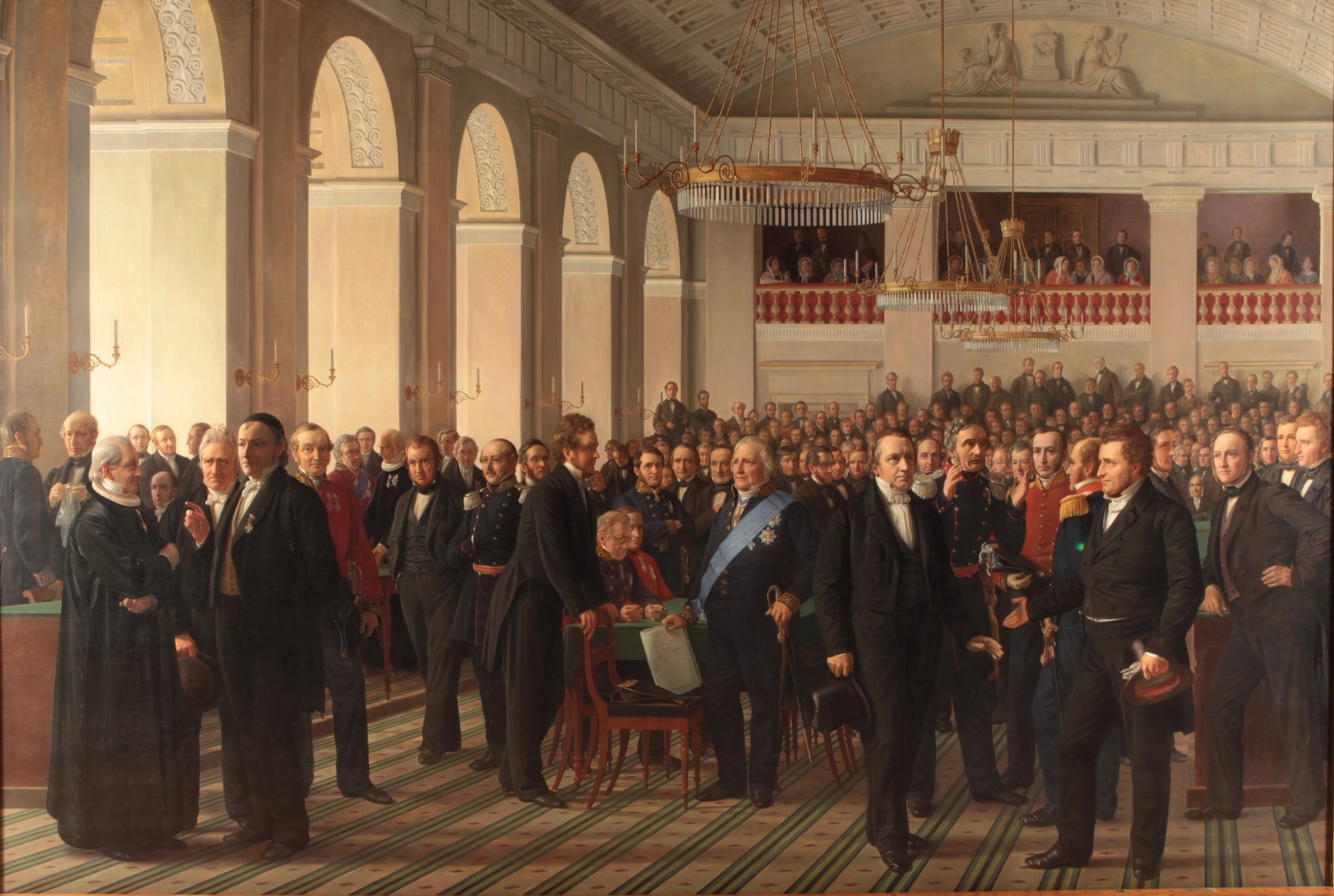
The National Constitutional Assembly (painting by Constantin Hansen 1860–64) (Frederiksborg Castle, Hillerød)

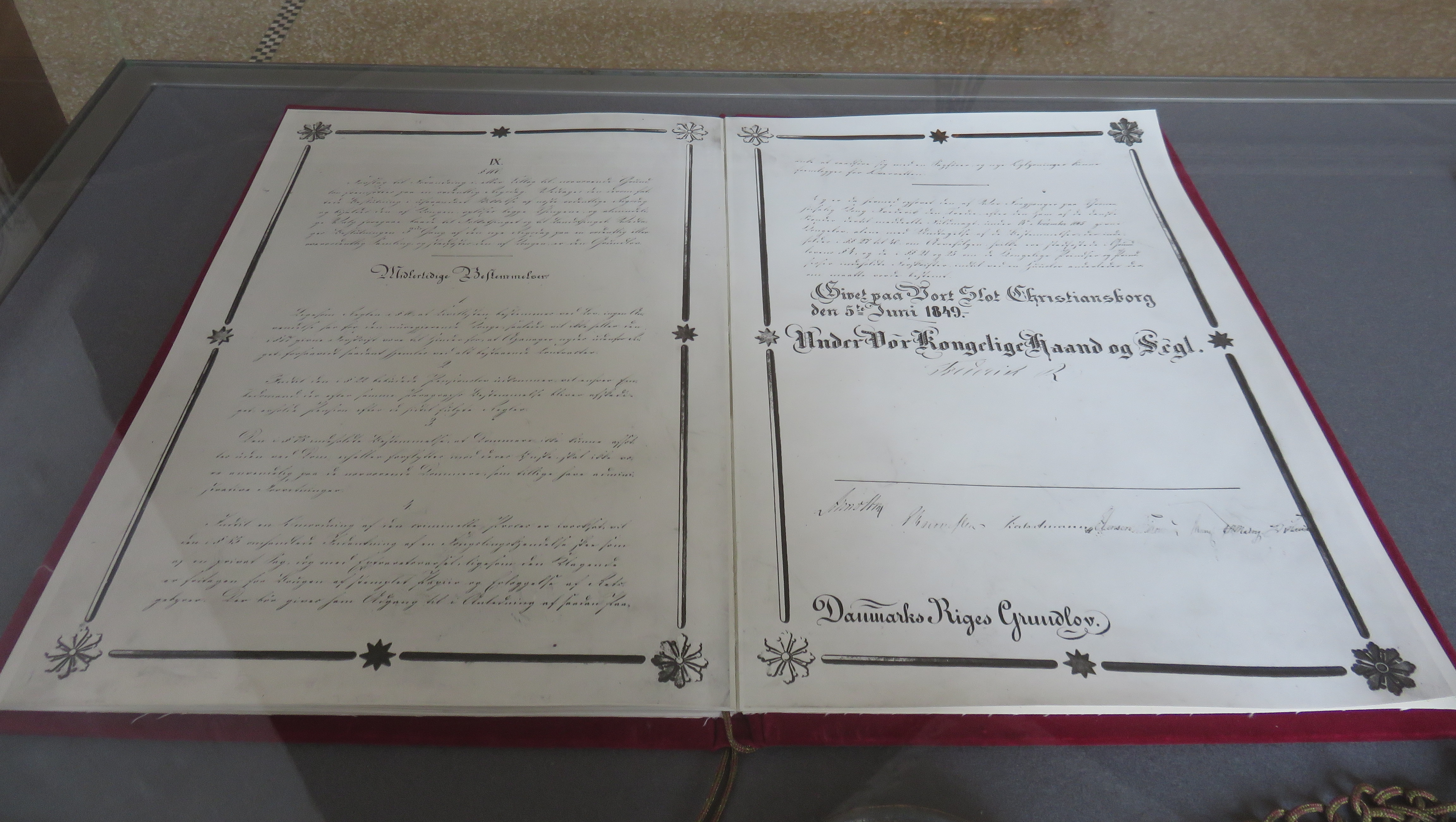
The Constitutional Act of 1849 on display in 2018

Monrad drafted the first draft of the Constitution, which was then edited by Lehmann. Sources of inspiration included the Constitution of Norway of 1814 and the Constitution of Belgium. The draft was laid before the Constitutional Assembly of the Realm (Den Grundlovgivende Rigsforsamling). This assembly, which consisted of 114 members directly elected in October 1848, and 38 members appointed by Frederick VII, was overall split in three different groupings: the National Liberals, the Friends of Peasants, and the Conservatives. A key topic for discussion was the political system, and the rules governing elections.

On 25 May 1849, the Constitutional Assembly approved the new constitution, and on 5 June 1849 it was signed by Frederick VII. For this reason, it is also known as the June constitution. Today, 5 June is known as Constitution Day.

The new constitution establish the Rigsdag, a bicameral parliament, with an upper house called the Landsting, and a lower house called the Folketing. While the voting rights for both chambers were the same, the elections to the Landsting was indirect, and the eligibility requirements harder. The constitution gave voting rights to 15% of the Danish population. Due to the First Schleswig war, the constitution was not put into force for Schleswig; instead this question was postponed to after the war.

=== Parallel constitution for the Unitary State (1855–1866) ===
Following the First Schleswig war, which ended in Danish victory in 1852, the London Protocol reaffirmed the territorial integrity of the Unitary State, and solved an impending succession issue, since Frederick VII was childless. Since the June constitution was not put into force in Schleswig, the Schleswig-Holstein question remained unsolved. Work for creating a common constitution for the Unitary State started, and in 1855 the rigsdag accepted Helstatsforfatning (Constitution for The Unitary State), which covered affairs common to Denmark, Schleswig and Holstein. At the same time, the June constitution was limited to only be applicable in Denmark.

In 1863 this constitution was changed, the new one was called Novemberforfatningen. This was shortly before Second Schleswig war, where Denmark lost control of Schleswig and Holstein, rendering the parallel constitution void.

=== The Revised Constitution (1866) ===
The Constitutions of Denmark located inside Folketinget.

In 1866, the defeat in the Second Schleswig War, and the loss of Schleswig-Holstein led to tightened election rules for the Upper Chamber, which paralyzed legislative work, leading to provisional laws.

The conservative Højre had pressed for a new constitution, giving the upper chamber of parliament more power, making it more exclusive and switching power to the conservatives from the original long standing dominance of the National Liberals, who lost influence and was later disbanded. This long period of dominance of the Højre party under the leadership of Jacob Brønnum Scavenius Estrup with the backing of the king Christian IX of Denmark was named the provisorietid (provisional period) because the government was based on provisional laws instead of parliamentary decisions. This also gave rise to a conflict with the Liberals (farm owners) at that time and now known as Venstre (Left). This constitutional battle concluded in 1901 with the so-called systemskifte (change of system) with the liberals as victors. At this point the king and Højre finally accepted parliamentarism as the ruling principle of Danish political life. This principle was not codified until the 1953 constitution.

=== Universal suffrage (1915) ===
In 1915, the tightening from 1866 was reversed, and women were given the right to vote. Also, a new requirement for changing the constitution was introduced. Not only must the new constitution be passed by two consecutive parliaments, it must also pass a referendum, where 45% of the electorate must vote yes. This meant that Prime Minister Thorvald Stauning's attempt to change the Constitution in 1939 failed.

=== Reunion with Schleswig (1920) ===
In 1920, a new referendum was held to change the Constitution again, allowing for the reunification of Denmark following the defeat of Germany in World War I. This followed a referendum held in the former Danish territories of Schleswig-Holstein regarding how the new border should be placed. This resulted in upper Schleswig becoming Danish, today known as Southern Jutland, and the rest remained German.

=== Current Constitution (1953) ===
In 1953, the fourth constitution abolished the Upper Chamber (the Landsting), giving Denmark a unicameral parliament, while also making Greenland a part of Denmark and giving it representatives. It also enabled females to inherit the throne (see Succession), but the change still favored boys over girls (this was changed by a referendum in 2009 so the first-born inherits the throne regardless of sex). Finally, the required number of votes in favor of a change of the Constitution was decreased to the current value of 40% of the electorate.

== Summary of the constitution ==
The Danish constitution consists of 89 sections, structured into 11 chapters. The Folketing have published the constitution with explanatory annotations; it is available in both Danish and English through their website.

Chapter		Sections	Content
1	Form of government	§§ 1–4	Denmark is a constitutional monarchy, with separation of powers into the three classic branches: the legislative, held by the Folketing; the executive held by the government; and the judiciary, held by the courts. The throne is inherited according to the Act of Succession, which itself has the same status as the constitution. The Church of Denmark is the state church. The constitution holds for the entire Danish realm.
2	The royal family	§§ 5–11	There are a number of requirements that the monarch must live up to, most importantly they must belong to the evangelical Lutheran faith; in practice they have always have been members of the Church of Denmark. The age of majority for the monarch is at 18 years, and the Folketing can make provisions if the monarch is incapable, minor or abroad, and choose a new monarch if there are no heirs to the throne. Royal expenses are financed through annuities granted by the Folketing.
3	The government	§§ 12–27	The monarch, (Note: Although the constitution refers to the monarch as the "King", this can also be a queen regnant. As the monarch executes all powers through the government, the use of "King" is generally interpreted by jurists to mean the government.) who formally holds executive power, always exercises this power through the ministers in the government, making the role of monarch fully ceremonial. Denmark employs the principle of negative parliamentarianism, namely that no minister can remain in their post, if a majority of the Folketing opposes them. In addition ministers can be trialed at the Court of Impeachment (§§ 59–60) for their actions while in government. Government business are discussed in the Council of State or the Council of Ministers, who today have little importance. New laws must receive royal assent and be proclaimed; this happens in Lovtidende. Pre-constitutional laws remain in effect. Ministers have the right to propose laws and decision (in case they are not members of the Folketing), and the government is allowed to pardon criminals and mint coins. Under exceptional circumstances, the government can enact temporary laws, which must be reaffirmed by the Folketing as quickly as possible. In foreign policy, important decisions are taken by the Foreign Policy Committee in the Folketing, including the ratification of treaties, and the initiation of offensive military operations. A certain type of civil servants, known in Danish as tjenestemænd (lit. servicemen), have special privileges to prevent corruption. § 20 allows Denmark to hand over sovereignty to intergovernmental organizations, which is often a requirement for joining them. This needs a supermajority of 5/6 in the Folketing, or that it is approved in a referendum.
4	Elections to the Folketing	§§ 28–34	The Folketing consists of up to 179 members, (Note: The constitution says "not more than" 179, but the Danish election law says that exactly 179 members are elected.) of which two are elected from Greenland, and two from the Faroe Islands. Elections are held at least every 4 years, with the Prime Minister able to call a snap election. Elections are direct and secret, and the voting system shall ensure proportional representation. To vote you need to be a Danish citizen not under legal guardianship, live in Denmark, and be above the voting age. The voting age was set to 23 years in a 1953 referendum, but has since been lowered three times, and has been 18 years since 1978. Changes to the voting age require a referendum. All eligible to vote are eligible to run for a seat in the Folketing; however the Folketing can expel members who have been convicted of a crime, if they deem that they are "unworthy" of their seat. Acts against the security or freedom of the Folketing is high treason.
5	The Folketing	§§ 35–58	The business year runs from the first Tuesday in October to the first Tuesday in October the next year. After a general election and at the beginning of a new business year, all unfinished business is dropped, and the Folketing starts anew. The Folketing elects a speaker and vice chairmen, both after an election and at the beginning of each business year. A business year starts with an opening speech from the prime minister. The Folketing meets where the government resides, which is in Christiansborg Palace. The speaker calls the meetings, and are obliged to do so on request from the prime minister or two-fifths of the Folketing. Meetings are public accessible; closed meetings can be held, but the last time this happened was in 1924, during a conflict with Norway over Greenland. A quorum consists of half of the members. Every member of the Folketing can propose laws and decisions, and only they (and ministers per § 21) can do that. All bills require three readings before being passed into law. One-third of the Folketing can demand that an otherwise passed bill should be confirmed in a referendum, though some bills, among those fiscal bills, cannot be subject of a referendum. Each year, a finance bill, which defines the state budget, needs to be passed into law for the following fiscal year (which since 1979 has followed the calendar year). A provisional appropriations bill can be passed if the finance bill is not passed in time. A budget or a supplementary appropriation act is necessary to charge taxes and spend money, though in practice the Finance Committee have been allowed to approve extra expenditures, which are then spent before being passed into law. The public accounts shall be ready six months after the fiscal year, and are audited by the State Auditors, who are appointed by the Folketing. Members of the Folketing receive a salary, and have absolute freedom of speech within the Folketing. In addition, they have parliamentary immunity, except if caught in the act, though this immunity can be lifted by the Folketing. Members are not in any way bound by pledges or what their party says, but free to vote in any way they wish. They can ask ministers questions, who are then obliged to answer. Appointments to parliamentary committees are done through proportional representation. The Folketing appoint one or two ombudsmen; the Folketing have decided to only appoint one. The Folketing can establish parliamentary commissions for investigations, though this have only happened five times; usually commissions led by a judge is used instead. All taxes, state loans, and military inscriptions must be set in laws. Foreigners can only be naturalized by law, and only buy real-estate as permitted by law.
6	The courts	§§ 59–65	The courts are independent of the government, though they are regulated by law. Establishing a new court to handle a specific case is not allowed. Judges answers to no-one, and in general cannot be fired or forcefully moved to a new position, unless due to a restructuring, or by verdict from other judges. Judges above 65 years can be fired, but will receive full pay until the mandatory retirement age, which is currently 70 years. It is possible to sue public agencies. The Folketing can establish special courts to handle such cases, and their verdicts can be appealed to the Supreme Court, though none have been established. Court proceedings must be as transparent as possible, and lay judges must be used in criminal cases. The special Court of Impeachment, which decides cases against ministers, consists of the 15 most senior Supreme Court judges and an equal amount appointed by the Folketing. The appointed judges cannot be members of the Folketing themselves, and sits for 6 years but remain on cases started before the end of their term. Cases are brought before the impeachment court by the government or the Folketing. Only six impeachment cases have been held; the most recent as of 2022 was the 2021 case against former Minister for Immigration, Inger Støjberg.
7	Religion	§§ 66–70	The Church of Denmark is the state church by § 4, and the Folketing can by statue decide its constitution, but has not done so. Denmark has freedom of religion, and allows all to form and join religious communities, as long as they do not impinge on "good morals or public order". No-one is forced to pay to religions that are not their own, so the church tax is only paid by members of the Church of Denmark. Religious observance or race does not affect people's civic and political rights and duties.
8	Citizens' rights	§§ 71–85	No citizen can be held in detention based on their race, religion or political views, and detention can only be used if prescribed by law. People arrested need to be put before a judge within 24 hours, known in Danish as a grundlovsforhør (lit. constitutional interrogation), which decides if the provisional detention should be continued, and this decision can always be appealed. Special rules can apply in Greenland. Detention outside the criminal system or the immigration system, say due to mental illness, can be brought before the courts. A search warrant is needed to enter private property, confiscate things, or break the secrecy of correspondence, though general exemptions can be made by law. Expropriations must be for the public good, with full compensation, and as allowed by law. Bills regarding expropriations can by 1/3 of the Folketing be delayed until passed again after a general election. All expropriations can be brought before the courts. Denmark has freedom of speech and freedom of press, but some things, say libel or breaking confidentiality, can still be brought before a judge. Censorship is forbidden. All citizens have freedom of association, but associations who use violence or other illegal means can be temporary banned by the government, while dissolution is tested in court. Dissolution of political association can always be appealed to the Supreme Court. Citizens have freedom of assembly when unarmed, though danger to public order can lead to outdoor assemblies being banned. In case of riots, the police can dissolve assemblies when it "in the name of the King and the law" have requested it three times. Freedom from detention, freedom of association and freedom of assembly can be restricted for military personnel. All children have the right to free public education, though no duty to use it; home schooling and private schools are allowed. The political system shall seek to make sure that all able to work can find a job. Those unable to support themselves have the right to public support, if they submit to the related requirements. Access to professions shall only be regulated for the public good, so trade guilds cannot regulate this themselves. Every healthy man have a duty to take part in the military draft. There are no privileges attached to nobility, and in the future, no fiefs or fee tails can be created. Municipalities have the right to govern themselves.
9	The Faroe Islands, Greenland and Iceland	§§ 86–87	In Denmark, the voting age for municipally elections and elections to congregation boards are the same as for general elections. In Greenland and the Faroe Island, it is decided by law. Icelandic citizens, who already have rights as if they were Danish citizens, retains these rights. The background for this transitional provision is that Iceland became independent from Denmark in 1918, but, as Kingdom of Iceland, remained in a personal union until 1944, when it became a republic. The 1918 Danish–Icelandic Act of Union granted Icelandic citizens the same rights in Denmark as Danish citizens, and after the union was dissolved in 1944, these rights were limited to Icelandic citizens then living in Denmark.
10	Changes to the constitution	§ 88	All changes to the constitution requires a majority in the Folketing twice; both before and after a general election. In addition, proposed changes must achieve a majority in a referendum, where (in addition) at least 40% of all eligible voters must support the change.
11	Entry into force	§ 89	The current constitution entered into force on 5 June 1953, when published in Lovtidende. The Rigsdag, the sitting bicameral legislative under the old constitution, remained in place until the September 1953 general election, where the Landsting, the chamber in addition to the Folketing, was abolished.

== Constitutional institutions ==
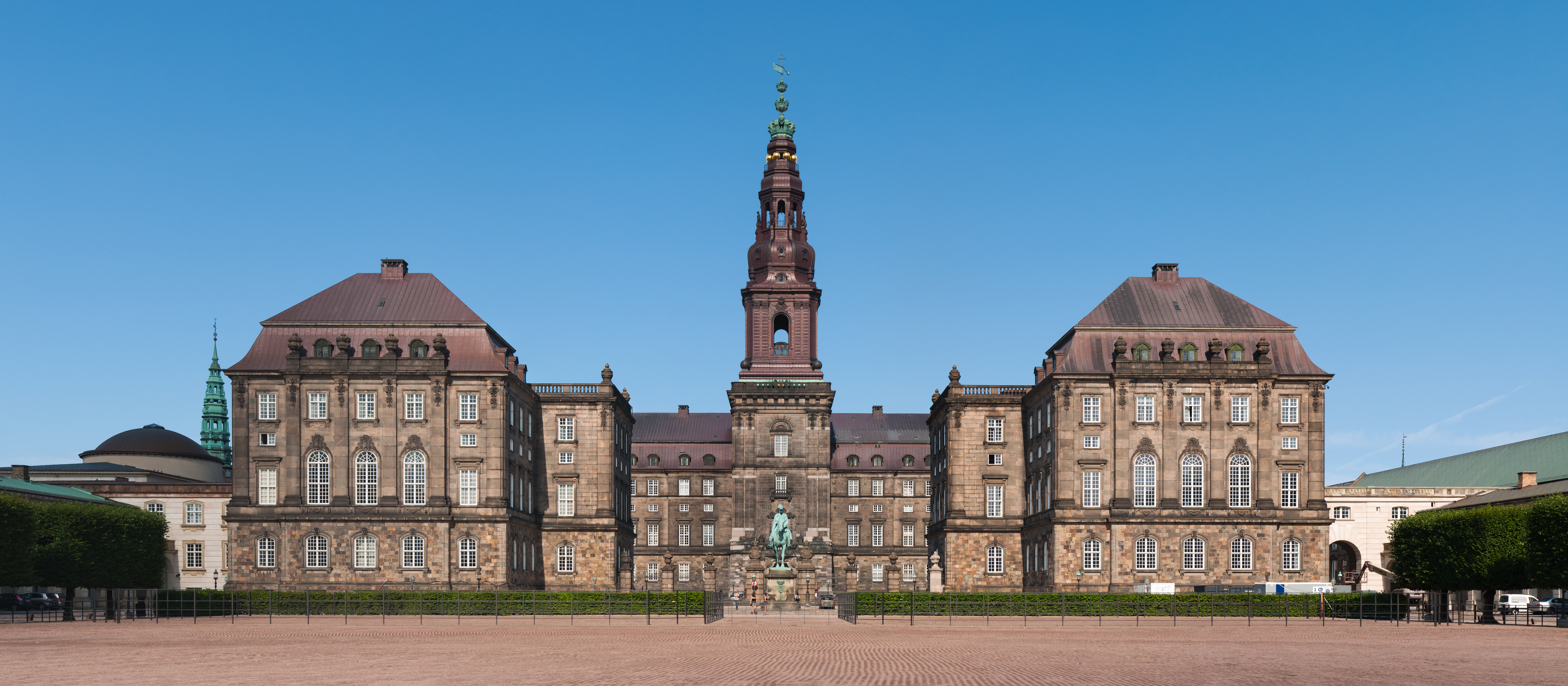
Christiansborg Palace, where both the government, the Folketing and the Supreme Court resides.

The Constitution establishes Denmark as a constitutional monarchy, where the monarch serves as a ceremonial Head of state. The title of monarch is hereditary and passed on to the firstborn child, with equal rights for sons and daughters.

The political system of Denmark can be described as a democracy with a parliamentary system of governance. The powers of the state is separated into 3 different branches. The legislative branch held by the Folketing, the executive branch held by the Danish government, and the judicial branch held by the Courts of Denmark.

=== The monarchy ===
The Danish monarch, (Note: While the Constitution consistently refer to the monarch as the "king", this can also be a queen regnant.) as the head of state, holds great de jure power, but de facto only serves as a figurehead who is not interfering in politics. The monarch formally holds executive power and, co-jointly with the Folketing, legislative power, since each new law requires royal assent. By articles 12, 13 and 14, the powers vested in the monarch can only be exercised through the ministers, who are responsible for all acts, thus removing any political or legal liability from the monarch. (Note: For this reason, when reading the Constitution, the word king, in the context of exercising acts of state, is to be read as the Government (consisting of the Prime Minister and other ministers)) Article 19(2), which bans the monarch to wage war unless for defence purposes or otherwise authorized by the Folketing, is generally interpreted to refer to the monarch's supreme control over Defence (the armed forces), although the monarch's control over Defence is still constrained by articles 12, 13 and 14. (Note: This means that de facto supreme control over Defence rests within the Government.) The monarch appoints the ministers after advice from the Prime Minister. The Prime Minister is itself appointed after advice from the leaders of the political parties of the Folketing, a process known as a King's meeting (Danish: Kongerunde). The monarch and the Cabinet attend regular meetings in the Council of State, where royal assent is given, and the monarch is regularly briefed on the political situation by the Prime Minister and Foreign minister.

The Constitution requires the monarch to be a member of the Evangelical Lutheran Church, though not necessary the Church of Denmark.

=== The government ===
The Government holds executive power, and is responsible for carrying out the acts of the Folketing. The Government does not have to pass a vote of confidence before taking the seat, but any minister can be subject to a motion of no confidence. If a vote of no confidence is successfully passed against the Prime Minister, the government must resign or call a snap election.

=== The Folketing ===
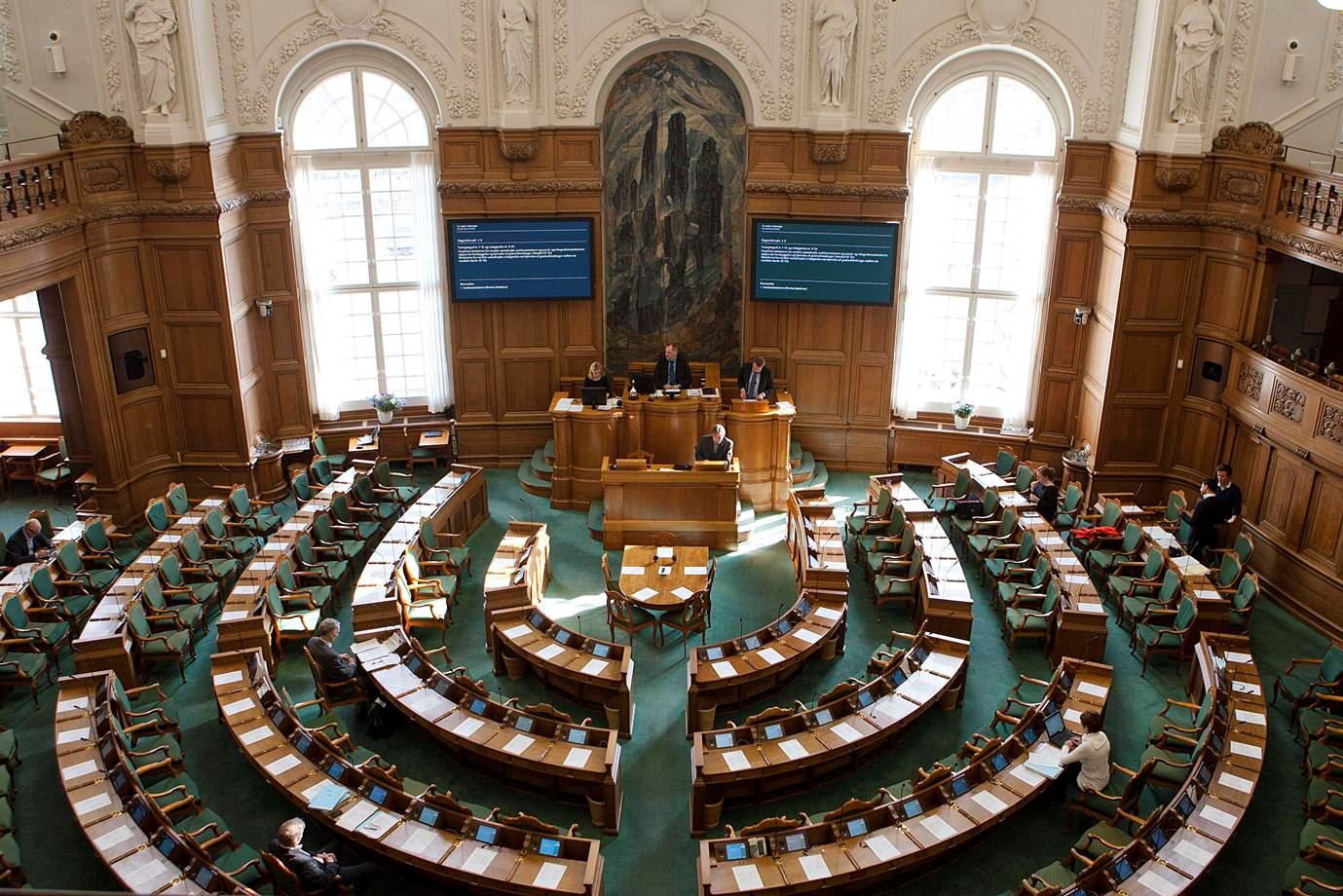
The Folketing chamber, inside Christiansborg Palace

The Folketing is the legislative branch of Denmark, and is located at Christiansborg. It consists of 179 members, (Note: While the Constitution says that "not more than" 179 members are elected, the law concerning general elections states that exactly 179 members are elected.) of which there are four "North Atlantic mandates"; 2 members are elected in Greenland, and 2 in the Faroe Islands. General elections is nominally held every 4 years, but the Prime Minister can at any point call a snap election. All Danish citizens over the age of 18 years who are living permanently within Denmark is eligible to vote, except those placed under legal guardianship. The same group of people is able to run for office. The electoral system is characterized as a party-list proportional representation system, with an election threshold on 2%. As a result, Denmark has a multi-party parliamentary system, where no single party has an absolute majority.

The session starts anew each year on the first Tuesday in October, and when interrupted by a general election; all previously unfinished business is cancelled. The Folketing then elects a speaker, who is responsible for convening meetings. The Folketing lay down their own rules of procedure, subject to the requirements in the Constitution. Among those, the required quorum of 90 members of the Folketing, and the rule that every proposed law requires three readings in the Folketing, before it can be passed into law.

The Folketing also have the responsibility of holding the government accountable for the governance. The members of the Folketing does this by submitting questing to the ministers and convene them to explanatory hearings. In addition, the Folketing elect a number of State Auditors (Danish: Statsrevisorer), who has the responsibility to look through the public accounts, and check that everything is okay, and that the government only spend money approved by the Folketing. Furthermore, the Folketing also appoints an ombudsman, who investigates wrongdoings by the public administrative authorities on behalf of the public.

=== The courts ===
The Courts of Denmark are independent of the other two branches. The Constitution does not stipulate how the courts are to be organized. Instead, this is regulated by statute. In the normal court system, there are 24 District Courts, High Courts and the Supreme Court. In addition to these, there is some special courts. There are certain rights in the Constitution with respect to the judiciary system.

There is a special Court of Impeachment, which can prosecute ministers for their official acts.

The court system is able to perform judicial review of laws, i.e. check if they are constitutional. This right is not included in the constitution, but was established by the Supreme Court in the beginning of the 20th century, when it decided to hear cases about the constitutionality of land laws. While this right was contested in the beginning, the political system eventually accepted it. The Supreme Court have been reluctant to rule laws unconstitutional; the only time it have done so was in 1999, when it found that the Tvind law breached the principle of separations of power. Cases about the constitutionality of laws can only be initiated by people directly affected by the laws. All can do this with respect to the Danish relation to EU, because of its wide effects on society.

=== The Church of Denmark ===
The Evangelical-Lutheran Church of Denmark is the state church and is established by the Constitution. The monarch has a number of duties within the Church of Denmark and is considered its ceremonial head.

=== The State Auditors ===
The state auditors are responsible for checking the public accounts. They are supported by Rigsrevisionen.

=== The Parliamentary Ombudsman ===
The Parliamentary Ombudsman is an independent institution under the Folketing, in charge of investigating and inspecting public authorities. It is inspired by Swedish example, and was established in 1955, following its inclusion in the 1953 constitution. The ombudsman is both appointed by and can be dismissed by the Folketing. The ombudsman cannot be a member of the Folketing themselves. While the constitution allows the Folketing to appoint two ombudsmen, by law it only appoints one. The current ombudsman, as of December 2019, is Niels Fenger.

The ombudsman handles 4,000-5,000 complains annually from the general public, and can also open cases on its own accord. In addition to that, the ombudsman have a monitoring division that inspects prisons, psychiatric institutions and social care homes. Since 2012 it has also had a children's division. The ombudsman cannot demand any action from the administration. It can only voice criticism and make recommendations, but these carry a lot of weight, and its recommendations are usually followed by the administration.

== Civil rights ==
The Constitution of Denmark outlines fundamental rights in sections 71–80. Several of these are of only limited scope and thus serve as a sort of lower bar. The European Convention on Human Rights was introduced in Denmark by law on 29 April 1992 and supplements the mentioned paragraphs.

=== Personal liberty ===
Personal liberty shall be inviolable. No Danish subject shall in any manner whatever be deprived of his liberty because of his political or religious convictions or because of his descent.

— Section 71

The constitution guarantees the personal liberty. No citizen can be held in detention based on their race, religion or political views, and detention can only be used if prescribed by law. People arrested need to be put before a judge within 24 hours, known in Danish as a grundlovsforhør (lit. constitutional interrogation), who decides if the provisional detention should be continued, and this decision can always be appealed. Special rules can apply in Greenland. Detention outside the criminal system or the immigration system, say due to mental illness, can be brought before the courts.

=== Right to property ===
The constitution guarantees the right to property. A search warrant is needed to enter private property, confiscate things, or break the secrecy of correspondence, though general exemptions can be made by law. Expropriations must be for the public good, with full compensation, and as allowed by law. Bills regarding expropriations can by 1/3 of the Folketing be delayed until passed again after a general election. All expropriations can be brought before the courts.

=== Freedom of speech and freedom of the press ===
Denmark have freedom of speech and freedom of press, but some things, say libel or breaking confidentiality, can still be brought before a judge. Censorship is forbidden. §77: "Anyone is entitled to in print, writing and speech to publish his or hers thoughts, yet under responsibility to the courts. Censorship and other preventive measures can never again be introduced."

There's widespread agreement in Danish legal theory that § 77 protects what is called "formal freedom of speech" (formel ytringsfrihed), meaning that one cannot be required to submit one's speech for review by authorities before publishing or otherwise disseminating it. However, there is disagreement about whether or not § 77 covers "material freedom of speech" (materiel ytringsfrihed), the right to not be punished for one's speech. There is agreement that the phrasing "under responsibility to the courts" gives legislators some right to restrict speech, but conversely there have been several court decisions implying that some material freedom of speech does exist. The discussion is about whether the material speech has limits or not, and if so, what those limits are.

=== Freedom of association ===
All citizens have freedom of association, but associations who use violence or other illegal means can be temporarily banned by the government, while dissolution is tested in court. Dissolution of political association can always be appealed to the Supreme Court.

In 1941, during the occupation by Nazi Germany, the Rigsdag banned the Communist Party through the communist law. The law also legalized existing internments of Danish communists, including members of the Folketing. Both the internments and the law broke rights in the constitution, but was justified by the necessity of the situation. The Supreme Court found the law constitutional; a decision that was criticized as the Supreme Court President had been involved in its creation. The case illustrated how far Danish politicians was willing to go to ensure Danish control of law enforcement, and that democracy can be stretched to ensure its continued existence.

In addition to the communist law, on only two occasions have an association been forcefully dissolved. In 1874, the International Workers Organization, a precursor to the Social Democrats, was dissolved for being revolutionary, and in 1924, the organization Nekkab was dissolved for being a meeting place for homosexuals. In 2020, the gang Loyal to Familia was dissolved by the Copenhagen City Court; a judgment that has been appealed. The gang was temporarily banned in 2018, and the court case – the first dissolution case against a criminal gang – was initiated. Prior to this, it has been investigated if Hells Angels, Bandidos and Hizb ut-Tahrir could be banned, but the conclusions was that it would be difficult to win the cases.

=== Freedom of assembly ===
Citizens have freedom of assembly when unarmed, though danger to public order can lead to outdoor assemblies being banned. In case of riots, the police can forcefully dissolve assemblies when they have requested the crowd to disperse "in the name of the King and the law" three times.

=== Freedom of religion ===
Section 4 establishes that the Evangelical Lutheran Church is "the people's church" (folkekirken), and as such is supported by the state. Freedom of religion is granted in section 67, and official discrimination based on faith is forbidden in section 70.

=== Other rights ===
All children have the right to free public education, though no duty to use it; home schooling and private schools are allowed. The political system shall seek to make sure that all able to work can find a job. Those unable to support themselves have the right to public support, if they submit to the related requirements. Access to professions shall only be regulated for the public good, so trade guilds cannot regulate this themselves.

== Other themes ==
=== National sovereignty ===
Section 20 of the current constitution establishes that the delegation of specified parts of national sovereignty to international authorities requires either a 5/6 supermajority in Parliament or an ordinary majority in both Parliament and the electorate. This section has been debated heavily in connection with Denmark's membership of the European Union (EU), as critics hold that changing governments have violated the Constitution by surrendering too much power.

In 1996, Prime Minister Poul Nyrup Rasmussen was sued by 12 Eurosceptics for violating this section. The Supreme Court acquitted Rasmussen (and thereby earlier governments dating back to 1972) but reaffirmed that there are limits to how much sovereignty can be surrendered before this becomes unconstitutional. In 2011, Prime Ministers Lars Løkke Rasmussen faced a similar challenge when he was sued by 28 citizens for having adopted the European Lisbon Treaty without a referendum. The group of professors, actors, writers and Eurosceptic politicians argued that the Lisbon Treaty hands over parts of national sovereignty to the EU and therefore a referendum should have taken place. The case was later dismissed.

Section 20 was used in 1972 when Denmark, after a referendum, joined the EEC (now EU). More recently, in 2015 an (unsuccessful) referendum was held on one of its EU-opt-outs.

=== Greenland and the Faroe Islands ===
As section one of the constitution states that it "shall apply to all parts of the Kingdom of Denmark", it also applies in the Faroe Islands and Greenland. The Faroe Islands and Greenland each elect two members to the Folketinget (the Folketing or Parliament); the remaining 175 members are elected in Denmark.

The Folketing has by law given the Faroe Islands and Greenland extensive autonomy; the Faroe Islands were given "home rule" in 1948, and Greenland was also given this status in 1979. Greenland's home rule was in 2009 replaced by "self rule". There is an ongoing legal debate about what constitutional weight these arrangements have. In general, there are two conflicting views: (a) the laws delegate power from the Folketing and can be revoked unilaterally by it, and (b) the laws have special status so changes require the consent of the Faroese Løgting or the Greenlandic Inatsisartut (Danish: Landstinget), respectively.

Proponents of the first interpretation include Alf Ross, Poul Meyer, and Jens Peter Christensen. Ross, the chief architect of the Faeroese home rule, compared it to an extended version of the autonomy of municipalities. Meyer wrote in 1947, prior to Faeroese home rule, that if power was delegated as extensive in other parts of the country, it would probably breach section 2 of the 1915 constitution, suggesting it did not do that here due to the Faroe Islands' separate history. Similarly, Christensen, a Supreme Court judge, said that due to the special circumstances, the scope of delegation need not be strictly defined.

Proponents of the second interpretation include Edward Mitens, Max Sørensen and Frederik Harhoff. Mitens, a Faeroese jurist and politician, argued that the Faeroese home rule had been approved by both the Løgting and the Rigsdag, so it was an agreement between two parties, in particular because the approval by the Løgting happened according to special rules put in place in 1940 with the consent of the Danish representative there, during the occupation by the United Kingdom. Sørensen said the intention with Faeroese home rule was that it should not be unilaterally changed, as stated in the preamble, so it had that effect. Harhoff, in his 1993 Doctorate dissertation, considered the home rule acts of the Faroe Islands and Greenland to be somewhere in between the constitution and a usual act by the Folketing, as it had been treated as such.

=== Separation of powers ===
Denmark have separation of powers into the three classic branches: the legislative, held by the Folketing; the executive held by the government; and the judiciary, held by the courts. The separation of powers is described in the constitution, and is there, as in many democracies, to prevent abuse of power. The Folketing enact laws, and the government implements them. The courts make judgments in disputes, either between citizens, or between authorities and citizens.

The Constitution is heavily influenced by the French philosopher Montesquieu, whose separation of powers was aimed at achieving mutual monitoring of each of the branches of government. However, the division between legislative and executive power in Denmark is not as sharp as in the United States.

In 1999, the Supreme Court found that the Tvind law, a law that barred specific schools from receiving public funding, was unconstitutional, because it breached the concept of separation of powers by settling a concrete dispute between the Tvind schools and the government. The judgment is the only time the courts have found a law to be unconstitutional.

=== Parliamentary power ===
In several sections the Constitutional Act sets out the powers and duties of the Danish Parliament. Section 15 in the Act, which deals with the parliamentary principle, lays down that "a Minister shall not remain in office after the Parliament has passed a vote of no confidence in him". This suggests that Ministers are accountable to Parliament and even subservient to it. The Cabinet exerts executive power through its Ministers, but cannot remain in office if the majority of the Folketing goes against it. Another important feature of the Danish parliamentary system is that the Constitutional Act lays down that "the Members of the Folketing shall be elected for a period of four years", but still, "the King may at any time issue writs for a new election".

== See also ==
- Codified constitution
- Constitutional economics
- Constitutionalism
- Constitutional law
- Index of Denmark-related articles
- Politics of Denmark
