= 1866 Peruvian general election =

- October 1866
- Presidential election
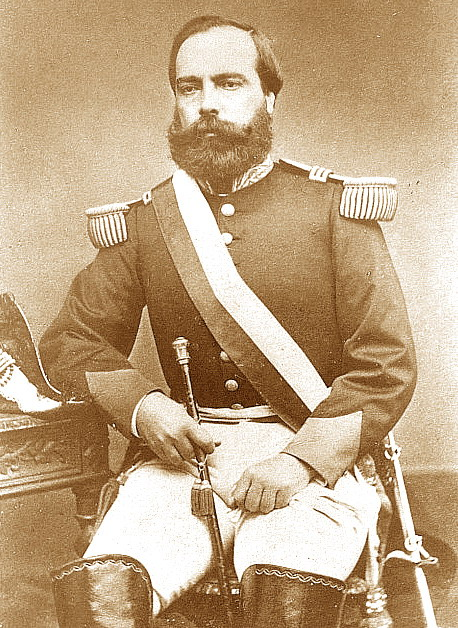

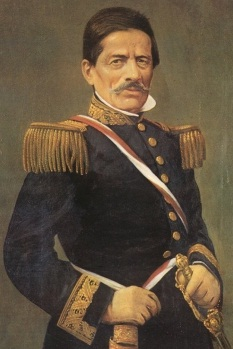
Candidate	Mariano Ignacio Prado	Ramón Castilla
Popular vote	199,499	2,299
Percentage	97.43%	1.12%
President before election
Mariano Ignacio Prado
Elected President
Mariano Ignacio Prado

General elections were held in Peru in 1866. The presidential election resulted in a victory for Mariano Ignacio Prado, who received 97% of the vote.

== Results ==
=== President ===
Candidate	Votes	%
Mariano Ignacio Prado	199,499	97.43
Ramón Castilla	2,299	1.12
José Balta	1,405	0.69
Ramón Vargas-Machuca	526	0.26
Mariano H. Ceballos	258	0.13
Manuel Costas Arce	132	0.06
Manuel Freyre	106	0.05
José Rufino Echenique	80	0.04
José Miguel Medina	69	0.03
Pedro Bustamante	59	0.03
Pedro Diez Canseco	47	0.02
Fermín del Castillo	38	0.02
José Santos Quiros	28	0.01
Luis La Puerta	25	0.01
Domingo Laos	14	0.01
Miguel San Roman	9	0.00
Antonio Arenas	8	0.00
Mariano Felipe Paz Soldán	8	0.00
Alejo Bezada	7	0.00
José F. Alvariño	7	0.00
Juan Oviedo	7	0.00
Mariano Pío Cornejo	6	0.00
Manuel I. Vivanco	6	0.00
Other candidates	113	0.06
Total	204,756	100.00
Valid votes	204,756	99.97
Invalid votes	14	0.01
Blank votes	48	0.02
Total votes	204,818	100.00
Source: Constituent Assembly
