= October 1866 Danish Folketing election =

Election for the lower house of Danish Parliament

Folketing elections were held in Denmark on 12 October 1866, following the introduction of a new constitution. The National Liberal Party and the National Left emerged as the largest factions, winning 20 seats each. Christian Emil Krag-Juel-Vind-Frijs remained Prime Minister.

== Electoral system ==
The elections were held using first-past-the-post voting in single-member constituencies. Only 15% of the population was eligible to vote in the elections, with suffrage restricted to men over 30 who were not receiving poor relief (or who had not paid back any previous poor relief received), were not classed as "dependents" (those who were privately employed but did not have a household) and who had lived in their constituency for a certain length of time.

== Results ==
Party	Votes	%	Seats	+/–
National Liberal Party			20	0
National Left			20	–10
A.F. Tscherning Left			18	+3
People's Left			18	+5
Mellem Party			18	+8
Højre			10	–3
Total			104	+3
Registered voters/turnout	251,558	32.5		
Source: Skov, Nohlen & Stöver
