= 1879 Danish Folketing election =

Election for the lower house of Danish Parliament

- 3 January 1879
- Turnout: 47.2%
Party	Seats	+/–
Liberals	65	−9
Højre	37	+11
This lists parties that won seats. See the complete results below.

Folketing elections were held in Denmark on 3 January 1879. The Liberals retained their majority, whilst voter turnout was around 47.2%.

== Results ==
Party	Votes	%	Seats	+/–
Liberals			65	–9
Højre			37	+11
Total			102	0
Registered voters/turnout	298,165	47.2		
Source: Nohlen & Stöver
