= 1876 Danish Folketing election =

Election for the lower house of Danish Parliament

Folketing elections were held in Denmark on 25 April 1876. The Liberals won a majority, whilst voter turnout was around 48.6%.

== Results ==
Party	Votes	%	Seats
Liberals			74
Højre			26
Independents			2
Total			102
Registered voters/turnout	288,747	48.6	
Source: Nohlen & Stöver
