= 1873 Danish Folketing election =

Election for the lower house of Danish Parliament

Folketing elections were held in Denmark on 14 November 1873. The result was a narrow victory for the Højre Coalition, which won 51 of the 101 seats. Ludvig Holstein-Holsteinborg remained Prime Minister following the elections.

== Electoral system ==
The elections were held using first-past-the-post voting in single-member constituencies. Only 15% of the population was eligible to vote in the elections, with suffrage restricted to men over 30 who were not receiving poor relief (or who had not paid back any previous poor relief received), were not classed as "dependents" (those who were privately employed but did not have a household) and who had lived in their constituency for a certain length of time.

== Results ==
Party	Votes	%	Seats	+/–
Højre Coalition			51	+3
United Left			50	–3
Total			101	0
Registered voters/turnout	279,007	51.7		
Source: Skov, Nohlen & Stöver
