= June 1866 Danish Folketing election =

Election for the lower house of Danish Parliament

Folketing elections were held in Denmark on 4 June 1866. The National Left emerged as the largest faction, winning 30 of the 101 seats. Christian Emil Krag-Juel-Vind-Frijs remained Prime Minister.

== Electoral system ==
The elections were held using first-past-the-post voting in single-member constituencies. Only 15% of the population was eligible to vote in the elections, with suffrage restricted to men over 30 who were not receiving poor relief (or who had not paid back any previous poor relief received), were not classed as "dependents" (those who were privately employed but did not have a household) and who had lived in their constituency for a certain length of time.

== Results ==
Party	Votes	%	Seats	+/–
National Left			30	New
National Liberal Party			20	–20
A.F. Tscherning Left			15	New
People's Left			13	New
Højre			13	+2
Mellem Party			10	New
Total			101	0
Registered voters/turnout	250,616	41.1		
Source: Skov, Nohlen & Stöver
