= Society of the Friends of Peasants =

Danish political party

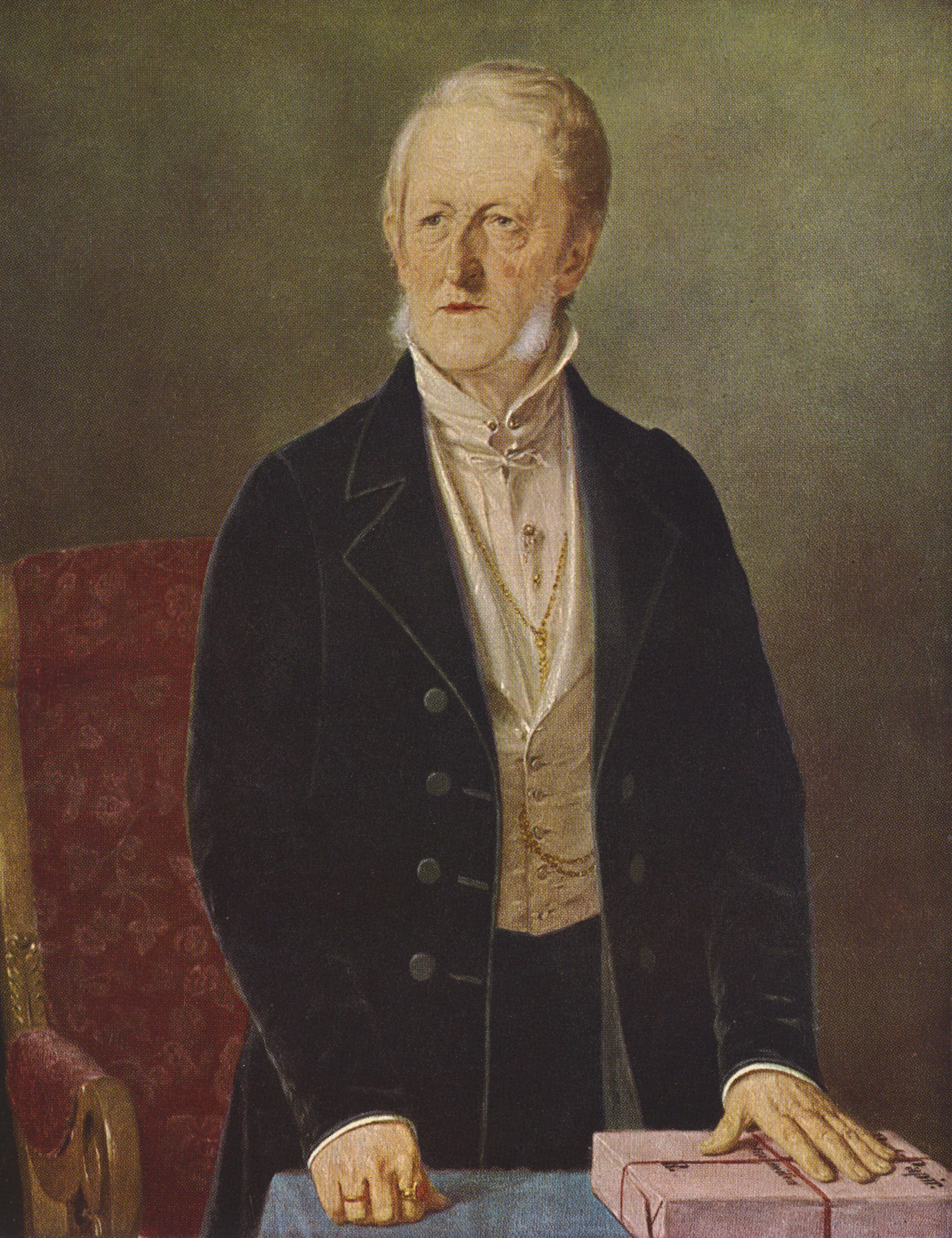
Johan Christian Drewsen in 1843

The Society of the Friends of Peasants (Danish: Bondevennernes Selskab) was a liberal Danish political society founded on 5 May 1846 by members of the provincial consultative assemblies Johan Christian Drewsen and Balthazar Christensen, with the intent to promote the liberation of the peasantry and equality among the different classes of society. Among its most politically influential members were Anton Frederik Tscherning, Jens Andersen Hansen and Carl Christian Alberti.

The society gained significant influence in the elections for the constitutional assembly in 1848, as the peasants were the only reasonably organized section of the population. Because of this, the society may be described as the first political party in Denmark. In alliance with the National Liberals they introduced general conscription for all men—as opposed to the previous conscription for peasants only—and a bicameral system consisting of the Folketing and the Landsting that enfranchised all landowning men above the age of 30 in the Constitution of 1849. Bondevennerne were the strongest advocates of giving suffrage to all landowning men, and they would have preferred a unicameral system. However, the conservatives and in part the National Liberals insisted on a bicameral system with suffrage to the Landsting restricted by income and with some of the members appointed by the king. It is to a large degree thanks to Bondevennerne that the 1849 constitution became as democratic as was the case.

In 1848, the society was represented in the first Danish government by War Minister Tscherning after the absolute monarchy, the Cabinet of Moltke I, a coalition government that spanned the political spectrum.

The number of members peaked in the middle of the 1850s at approximately 10,000, but due to internal conflicts and splits the influence of the society gradually dropped.

The society was represented in government for the second and last time in the Cabinet of Rotwitt from 1859 to 1860.

Although never formally dissolved, the society became part of the liberal party Det Forenede Venstre in 1872.
