= Minister for the Navy (Denmark) =

Former political position in Danish government

Minister of the Navy
- Marineminister
- Flag of the Minister for the Navy

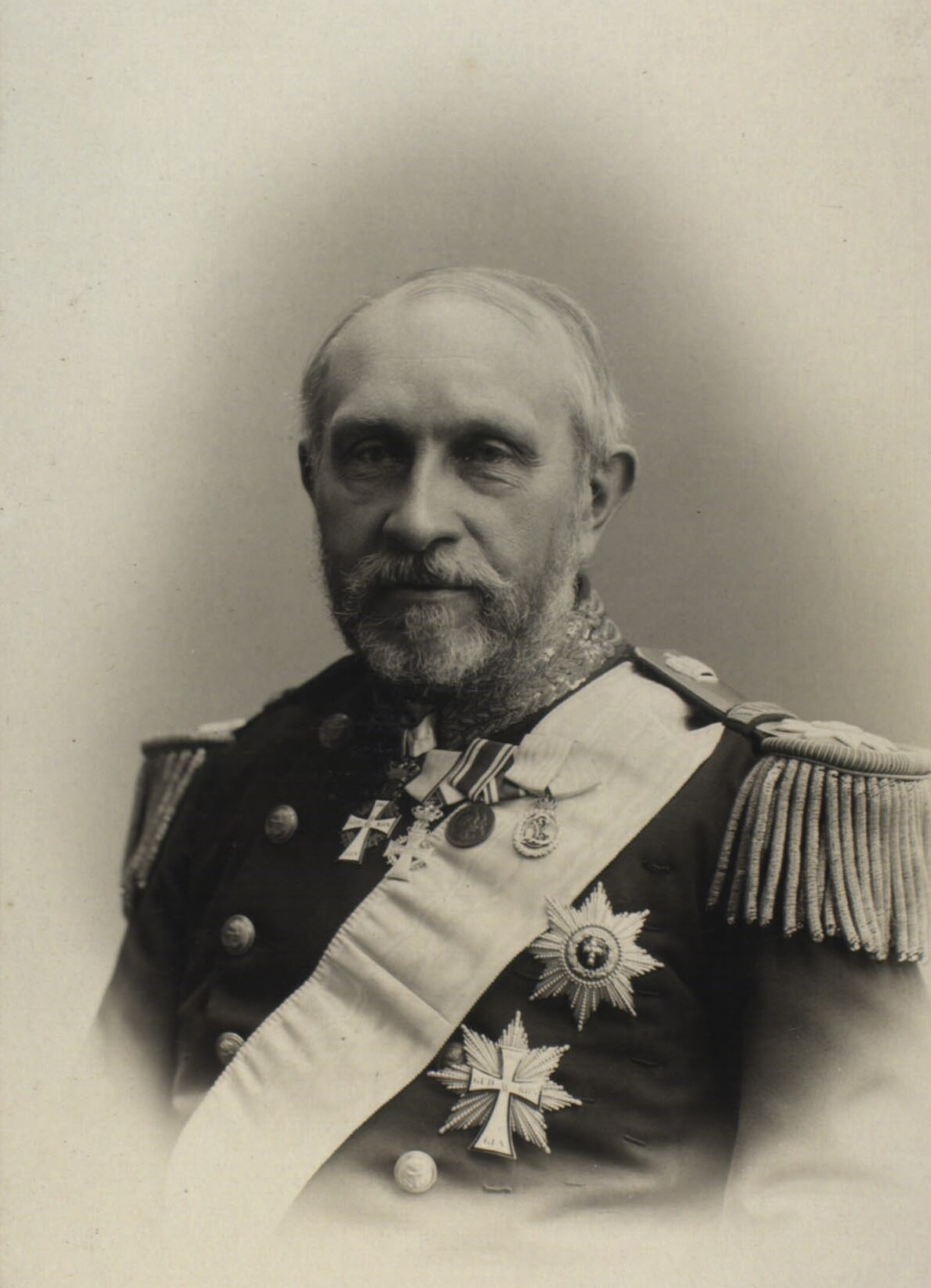
- Longest serving Niels Frederik Ravn; 21 May 1873—11 June 1875; 4 January 1879—27 April 1900
- Ministry for the Navy
- Type: Minister
- Member of: Cabinet; State Council
- Reports to: the Prime minister
- Seat: Slotsholmen
- Appointer: The Monarch (on the advice of the Prime Minister)
- Precursor: Admiralty
- Formation: 24 March 1848; 178 years ago
- First holder: Adam Wilhelm Moltke
- Final holder: Jens Christian Christensen
- Abolished: 5 August 1905; 121 years ago
- Superseded by: Minister of Defence
- Succession: depending on the order in the State Council
- Deputy: Permanent Secretary

The Minister for the Navy (Danish: Marineministeren) was the Danish minister responsible for the administration of the Royal Danish Navy.

== History ==
The position of Minister for the Navy was created following the end of the absolute monarchy, when the Admiralty (Danish: Admiralitetet) was disbanded, and power transferred to elected officials. While the Minister of War and the Minister for the Navy's positions were merged in 1905, the ministries continued to exist separately until 1950.

== List of ministers ==
No.	Portrait	Name (born–died)	Term of office			Cabinet	Ref.
No.	Portrait	Name (born–died)	Took office	Left office	Time in office	Cabinet	Ref.
1		Count; Adam Wilhelm Moltke (1785–1864)	24 March 1848	4 April 1848	11 days	Moltke I	
2		Commander-captain; Christian Christopher Zahrtmann (1793–1853)	6 April 1848	10 August 1850	2 years, 126 days	Moltke I–II	
–		Captain; Carl Irminger (1802–1888) acting	10 August 1850	25 November 1850	76 days	Moltke II	
3		Captain; Carl van Dockum (1804–1893)	25 November 1850	27 January 1852	1 year, 94 days	Moltke II–III–IV	
4		Commander; Steen Andersen Bille (1797–1883)	27 January 1852	12 December 1854	2 years, 319 days	Bluhme I Ørsted	
5		Commander; Ove Wilhelm Michelsen (1800–1880)	12 December 1854	2 December 1859	4 years, 355 days	Bang; Andræ; Hall I	
–		Major General; Hans Nicolai Thestrup (1794–1879) acting (Note: While serving as Minister of War.)	2 December 1859	24 February 1860	84 days	Rotwitt	
4		Counter Admiral; Steen Andersen Bille (1797–1883)	24 February 1860	31 December 1863	2 years, 319 days	Hall II	
6		Ship-of-the-Line Captain; Otto Hans Lütken (1813–1883)	31 December 1863	6 November 1865	1 year, 310 days	Monrad; Bluhme II	
7		Ship-of-the-Line Captain; Hans Herman Grove (1814–1866)	6 November 1865	29 July 1866	265 days	Frijs	
–		Jacob Brønnum Scavenius Estrup (1825–1913) acting	29 July 1866	17 September 1866	50 days	Frijs	
3		Counter Admiral; Carl van Dockum (1804–1893)	17 September 1866	1 November 1867	1 year, 45 days	Frijs	
8		Otto Fredrik Suenson (1810–1888)	1 November 1867	22 September 1869	1 year, 325 days	Frijs	
–		Major General; Valdemar Rudolph von Raasløff (1815–1883) acting	22 September 1869	19 April 1870	209 days	Frijs	
–		Count; Christian Emil Krag-Juel-Vind-Frijs (1817–1896) acting	19 April 1870	28 May 1870	39 days	Frijs	
–		Colonel; Wolfgang von Haffner (1810–1887) acting	28 May 1870	23 December 1870	209 days	Holstein-Holsteinborg	
–		Colonel; C.A.F. Thomsen (1827–1896) acting	23 December 1870	21 May 1873	2 years, 149 days	Holstein-Holsteinborg	
9		Captain; Niels Frederik Ravn (1826–1910)	21 May 1873	11 June 1875	2 years, 21 days	Holstein-Holsteinborg; Fonnesbech	
10		General; Wolfgang von Haffner (1810–1887)	11 July 1875	28 July 1877	2 years, 17 days	Estrup	
11		General; Frederik Dreyer (1814–1898)	28 July 1877	4 January 1879	1 year, 160 days	Estrup	
9		Vice Admiral; Niels Frederik Ravn (1826–1910)	4 January 1879	27 April 1900	2 years, 21 days	Estrup; Reedtz-Thott; Hørring	
12		Commander; Christian Giørtz Middelboe (1852–1920)	27 April 1900	24 July 1901	1 year, 88 days	Sehested	
13		Vice Admiral; Ferdinand Henrik Jøhnke (1837–1908)	24 July 1901	14 January 1905	3 years, 174 days	Deuntzer	
14		Jens Christian Christensen (1856–1930)	14 January 1905	5 August 1905	234 days	Christensen I	
