= Cabinet of Moltke =

The Cabinet of Moltke can refer to 4 successive Danish cabinets formed by Prime Minister Adam Wilhelm Moltke:

- The Cabinet of Moltke I (22 March 1848 – 15 November 1848)
- The Cabinet of Moltke II (16 November 1848 – 13 July 1851)
- The Cabinet of Moltke III (13 July 1851 – 18 October 1851)
- The Cabinet of Moltke IV (18 October 1851 – 28 January 1852)
