= Moltke I cabinet =

Danish government from 1848 to 1848

First cabinet of A. W. Moltke
- 1st Cabinet of Denmark

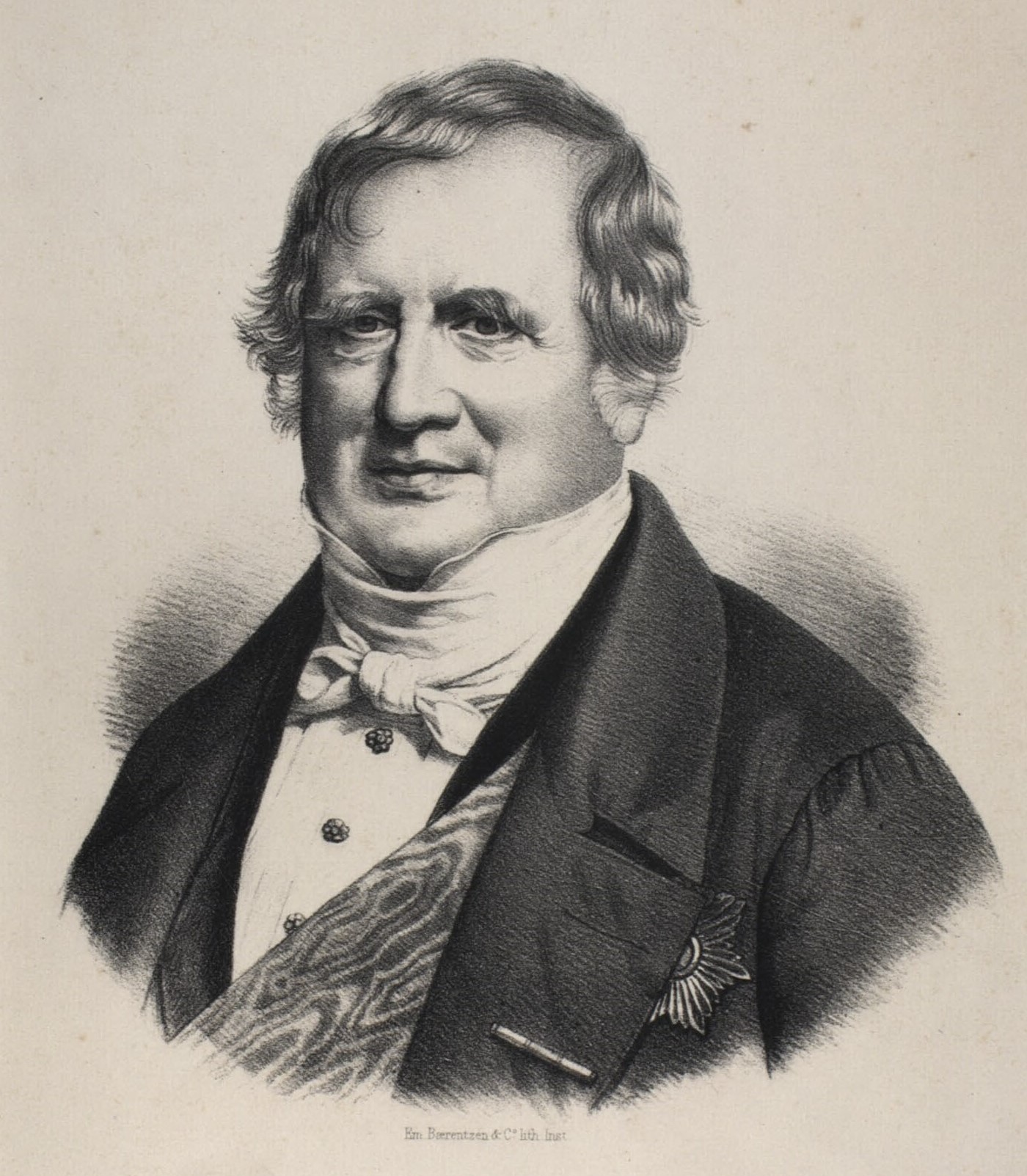
- Date formed: 22 March 1848
- Date dissolved: 16 November 1848

People and organisations
- Head of state: Frederick VII
- Head of government: Adam Wilhelm Moltke
- No. of ministers: 10
- Total no. of members: 11
- Member party: National Liberal Party; Society of the Friends of Peasants
- Status in legislature: Coalition

History
- Predecessor: None
- Successor: Moltke II

The First cabinet of A. W. Moltke was the government of Denmark from 22 March 1848 to 16 November 1848. It was also referred to as the March Cabinet.

In March 1848, Copenhagen was full of rumours that Schleswig and Holstein had rebelled against Denmark, and the National Liberals took advantage of the situation by arranging protest demonstrations against King Frederick VII and his politics. On 21 March, King Frederick responded by dismissing his ministers and asking Carl Emil Bardenfleth to form a new government. Bardenfleth failed to reach a compromise with the National Liberals, however, and so did Peter Georg Bang whom the king had asked to take his place. On the morning of 22 March, the king begged Adam Wilhelm Moltke, the leader of the previous cabinet, to lead a government of responsible ministers, effectively ending the absolute monarchy. Moltke quickly managed to put a government together.

Carl Scheel-Plessen was named acting minister for the Duchies, however resigned on 24 March 1848, before the appointment was formalized.

It was replaced by the Cabinet of Moltke II on 15 November 1848.

== List of ministers and portfolios ==
Cabinet members
Portfolio	Minister	Took office	Left office	Party	Ref
Prime Minister & Minister for Finance	Adam Wilhelm Moltke	22 March 1848	16 November 1848	Nonpartisan	
Minister of Foreign Affairs	Frederik Marcus Knuth	22 March 1848	16 November 1848	Nonpartisan	
Minister of Trade	Christian Albrecht Bluhme	22 March 1848	16 November 1848	Nonpartisan	
Minister of Justice	Carl Emil Bardenfleth	22 March 1848	16 November 1848	Nonpartisan	
Kultus Minister	Ditlev Gothard Monrad	22 March 1848	16 November 1848	National Liberal	
Minister of War	Anton Frederik Tscherning	22 March 1848	16 November 1848	Bondevennerne	
Minister of the Navy	Adam Wilhelm Moltke	22 March 1848	6 April 1848	Nonpartisan	
Minister of the Navy	Christian Christopher Zahrtmann	6 April 1848	16 November 1848	Nonpartisan	
Minister without portfolio	Orla Lehmann	22 March 1848	16 November 1848	National Liberal	
Minister without portfolio	Lauritz Nicolai Hvidt	22 March 1848	16 November 1848	National Liberal	

== See also ==
- Revolutions of 1848
- Schleswig-Holstein question
