= Christian Frederik Hansen (officer) =

Danish military officer

Christian Frederik Hansen R.E.
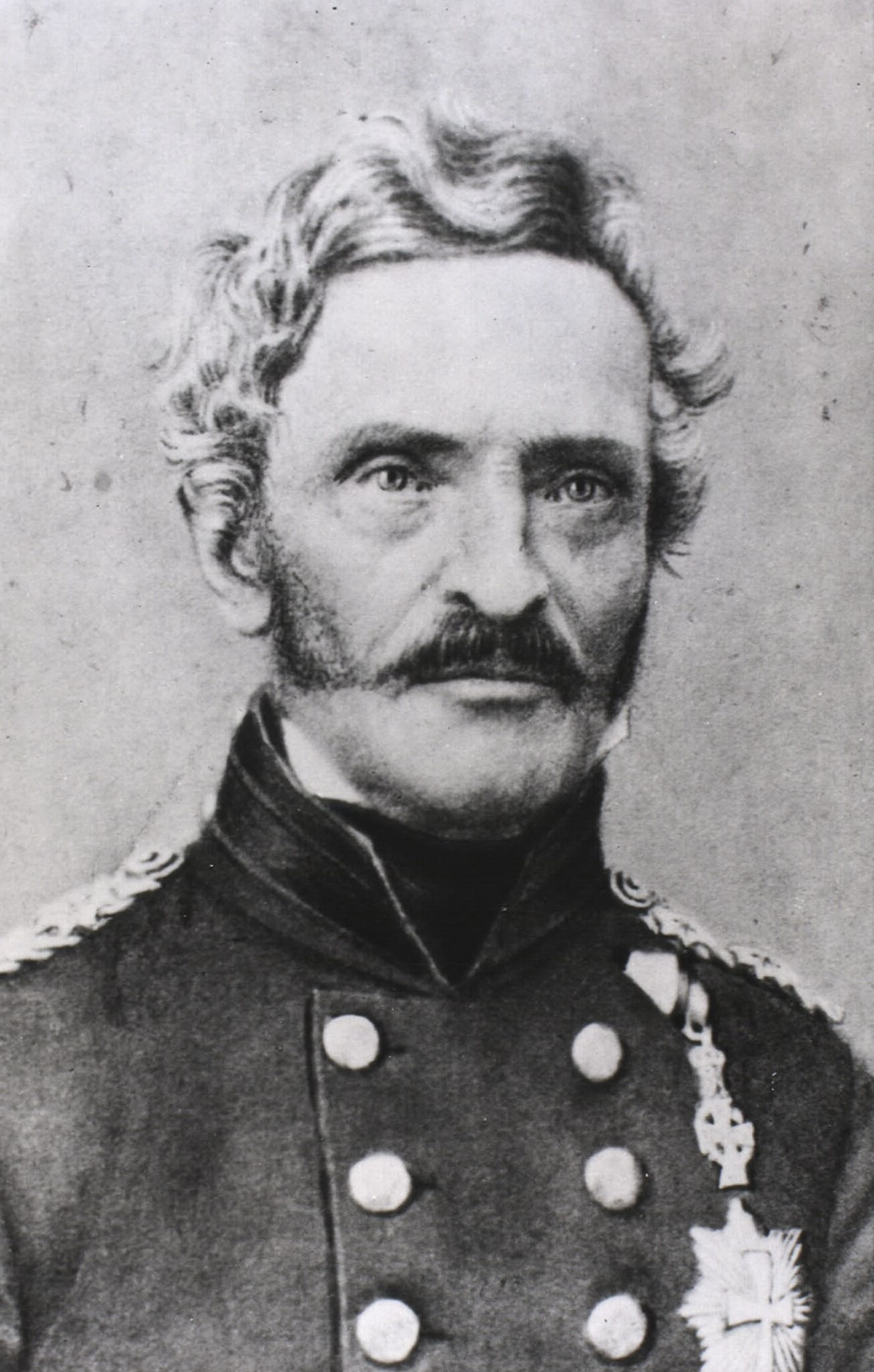

Minister of War
- In office 11 July 1864 – 6 November 1865
- Prime Minister: Christian Albrecht Bluhme
- Preceded by: Christian Emilius Reich
- Succeeded by: Johan Waldemar Neergaard
- In office 27 January 1852 – 12 December 1854
- Prime Minister: Christian Albrecht Bluhme; Anders Sandøe Ørsted
- Preceded by: Carl Julius Flensborg
- Succeeded by: Mathias Lüttichau
- In office 16 November 1848 – 13 July 1851
- Prime Minister: Adam Wilhelm Moltke
- Preceded by: Anton Frederik Tscherning
- Succeeded by: Jacob Scavenius Fibiger

Personal details
- Born: 29 November 1788 Helsingør
- Died: 22 June 1873 (aged 84) Copenhagen

Military service
- Branch/service: Royal Danish Army
- Years of service: 1808–1865

Christian Frederik Hansen (29 November 1788 – 22 June 1873), was a Danish military officer who served as Minister of War.

== Early life and career ==
Christian Frederik Hansen was born in Helsingør as the son of colonel Hans Chr. Hansen.

== Political offices ==
He served as Minister of Defence in the second cabinet of Moltke from 16 November 1848 to 13 July 1851. He later served as Minister of War in the cabinet of Bluhme from 27 January 1852 to 21 April 1853, then in the cabinet of Ørsted from 21 April 1853 to 12 December 1854 and finally in the second cabinet of Bluhme 11 July 1864 to 6 November 1865.

== Awards ==
He was appointed to general à la suite at the end of his political career. He received the Order of the Elephant in 1865.
