= Frijs Cabinet =

Danish government from 1865 to 1870

Krag-Juel-Vind-Frijs' cabinet
- 14th Cabinet of Denmark

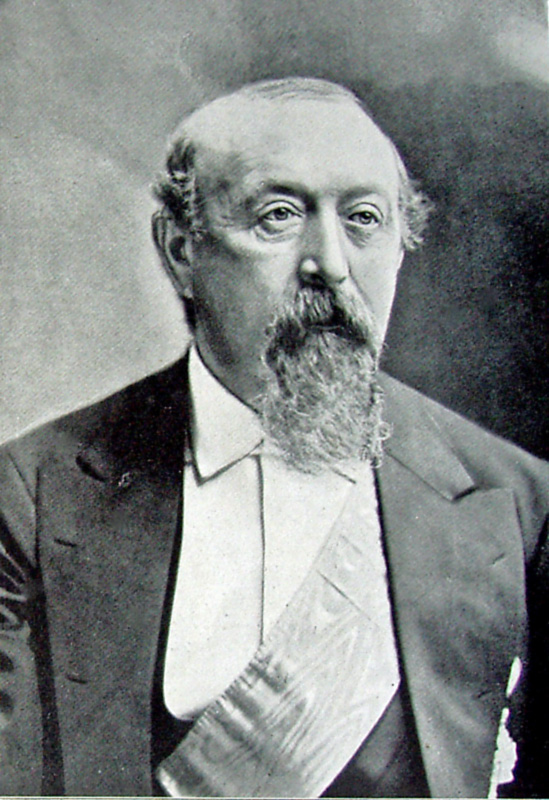
- Date formed: 6 November 1865
- Date dissolved: 28 May 1870

People and organisations
- Monarch: Christian IX
- Council President: Christian Emil Krag-Juel-Vind-Frijs
- No. of ministers: 6
- Ministers removed: 9
- Total no. of members: 15

History
- Elections: June 1866; October 1866; 1869
- Predecessor: Bluhme II
- Successor: Holstein-Holsteinborg

The Krag-Juel-Vind-Frijs cabinet was the government of Denmark from 6 November 1865 to 28 May 1870.

== List of ministers and portfolios ==
The cabinet consisted of the following ministers:

Cabinet members
Portfolio	Minister	Took office	Left office	Ref
Council President & Minister of Foreign Affairs	Christian Emil Krag-Juel-Vind-Frijs	6 November 1865	28 May 1870	
Kultus Minister	Peter Kierkegaard	4 September 1867	6 March 1868	
Kultus Minister	Christen Andreas Fonnesbech (act.)	6 March 1868	15 March 1868	
Kultus Minister	Aleth Hansen	15 March 1868	22 September 1869	
Kultus Minister	Ernst Emil Rosenørn	22 September 1869	28 May 1870	
Minister of Justice	Carl Leuning	6 November 1865	21 July 1867 #	
Minister of Justice	Theodor Rosenørn-Teilmann	21 July 1867	10 August 1868	
Minister of Justice	Carl von Nutzhorn	10 August 1868	28 May 1870	
Minister of Finance	Christen Andreas Fonnesbech	6 November 1865	28 May 1870	
Minister of the Interior	Jacob Brønnum Scavenius Estrup	6 November 1865	22 September 1869	
Minister of the Interior	Wolfgang von Haffner	22 September 1869	19 April 1870	
Minister of the Navy	Hans Herman Grove	6 November 1865	29 July 1866	
Minister of the Navy	Jacob Brønnum Scavenius Estrup (act.)	29 July 1866	17 September 1866	
Minister of the Navy	Carl van Dockum	17 September 1866	1 November 1867	
Minister of the Navy	Otto Frederik Suenson	1 November 1867	22 September 1869	
Minister of the Navy	Valdemar Rudolph von Raasløff (act.)	22 September 1869	19 April 1870	
Minister of the Navy	Christian Emil Krag-Juel-Vind-Frijs (act.)	19 April 1870	28 May 1870	
Minister of War	Johan Waldemar Neergaard	6 November 1865	1 October 1866	
Minister of War	Valdemar Rudolph von Raasløff	1 October 1866	19 April 1870	
Minister of War	Christian Emil Krag-Juel-Vind-Frijs (act.)	19 April 1870	28 May 1870	

Preceded by Bluhme II	Cabinet of Denmark; 6 November 1865 – 28 May 1870	Succeeded by Holstein-Holsteinborg
