= Cabinet of Bluhme =

The Cabinet of Bluhme may refer to 2 Danish cabinets formed by Prime Minister Christian Albrecht Bluhme:

- The Cabinet of Bluhme I (27 January 1852 – 21 April 1853)
- The Cabinet of Bluhme II (11 July 1864 – 6 November 1865)
