= Minister of War (Denmark) =

Former political position in Danish government

Minister of the Navy
- Krigsminister
- Proposed logo

- Shoulder insignia for the minister of war

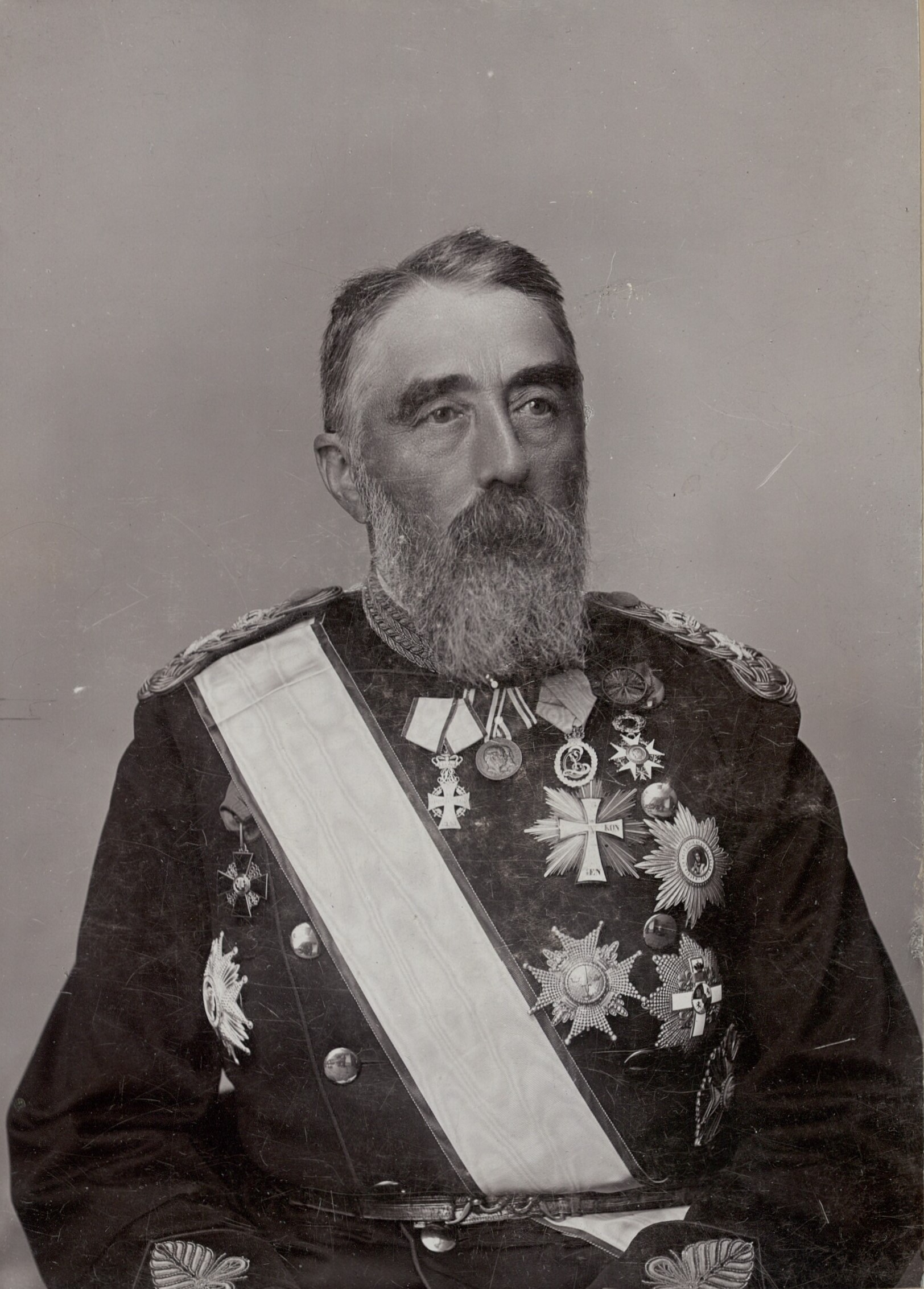
- Longest serving Jesper Jespersen Bahnson; 12 September 1884—7 August 1894
- Ministry for War
- Type: Minister
- Member of: Cabinet; State Council
- Reports to: the Prime minister
- Seat: Slotsholmen
- Appointer: The Monarch (on the advice of the Prime Minister)
- Precursor: Generalty and Commissariat College
- Formation: 24 March 1848; 178 years ago
- First holder: Anton Frederik Tscherning
- Final holder: Jens Christian Christensen
- Abolished: 5 August 1905; 121 years ago
- Superseded by: Minister of Defence
- Succession: depending on the order in the State Council
- Deputy: Permanent Secretary

The minister of war was the Danish minister responsible for the administration of the Royal Danish Army.

== History ==
The position of Minister of War was created following the end of the absolute monarchy, when the Generalty and Commissariat College (Danish: Generalitets- og Kommisariatskollegiet) was disbanded, and power transferred to elected officials. While the minister of war and the minister for the navy's positions were merged in 1905, the ministries continued to exist separately until 1950.

== List of ministers ==
No.	Portrait	Name (born–died)	Term of office			Cabinet	Ref.
No.	Portrait	Name (born–died)	Took office	Left office	Time in office	Cabinet	Ref.
1		Captain; Anton Frederik Tscherning (1795–1874)	24 March 1848	16 November 1848	239 days	Moltke I	
2		Lieutenant General; Christian Frederik von Hansen (1788–1873)	16 November 1848	13 July 1851	2 years, 239 days	Moltke II	
3		Major General; Jacob Scavenius Fibiger (1793–1861)	13 July 1851	18 October 1851	97 days	Moltke III	
4		Major General; Carl Julius Flensborg (1804–1852)	18 October 1851	27 January 1852	101 days	Moltke IV	
2		Lieutenant General; Christian Frederik von Hansen (1788–1873)	27 January 1852	12 December 1854	2 years, 319 days	Bluhme I Ørsted	
5		Colonel; Mathias Lüttichau (1795–1870)	12 December 1854	25 May 1856	1 year, 165 days	Bang	
6		Colonel; Carl Lundbye (1812–1873)	25 May 1856	2 December 1859	3 years, 191 days	Bang; Andræ; Hall I	
7		Major General; Hans Nicolai Thestrup (1794–1879)	2 December 1859	13 August 1863	3 years, 254 days	Rotwitt; Hall II	
6		Colonel; Carl Lundbye (1812–1873)	13 August 1863	18 May 1864	279 days	Hall II; Monrad	
8		Lieutenant Colonel; Christian Emilius Reich (1822–1865)	18 May 1864	11 July 1864	54 days	Monrad	
2		Lieutenant General; Christian Frederik von Hansen (1788–1873)	11 July 1864	6 November 1865	1 year, 118 days	Bluhme II	
9		Major General; Johan Waldemar Neergaard (1810–1879)	6 November 1865	1 October 1866	329 days	Frijs	
10		Major General; Valdemar Rudolph von Raasløff (1815–1883)	1 October 1866	19 April 1870	3 years, 200 days	Frijs	
–		Count; Christian Emil Krag-Juel-Vind-Frijs (1817–1896) acting	19 April 1870	28 May 1870	39 days	Frijs	
11		General; Wolfgang von Haffner (1810–1887)	28 May 1870	23 December 1870	209 days	Holstein-Holsteinborg	
12		Colonel; C.A.F. Thomsen (1827–1896)	23 December 1870	14 July 1874	1 year, 203 days	Holstein-Holsteinborg	
–		Commander; Niels Frederik Ravn (1826–1910) acting	14 July 1874	26 August 1874	43 days	Fonnesbech	
13		General; Peter Frederik Steinmann (1812–1894)	26 August 1874	11 June 1875	320 days	Fonnesbech	
11		General; Wolfgang von Haffner (1810–1887)	11 July 1875	28 July 1877	2 years, 17 days	Estrup	
14		General; Frederik Dreyer (1814–1898)	28 July 1877	4 January 1879	1 year, 160 days	Estrup	
15		General; Wilhelm Kauffmann (1821–1892)	4 January 1879	1 April 1881	2 years, 87 days	Estrup	
–		Commander; Niels Frederik Ravn (1826–1910)	1 April 1881	20 October 1881	202 days	Estrup	
16		Commander; Niels Frederik Ravn (1826–1910)	20 October 1881	12 September 1884	2 years, 328 days	Estrup	
17		Major General; Jesper Jespersen von Bahnson (1827–1909)	12 September 1884	7 August 1894	9 years, 329 days	Estrup	
12		Lieutenant General; C.A.F. Thomsen (1827–1896)	7 August 1894	25 April 1896	1 year, 268 days	Reedtz-Thott	
18		Colonel; Johan Gustav Frederik Schnack (1839–1920)	25 April 1896	23 May 1897	1 year, 28 days	Reedtz-Thott	
19		Colonel; Christian Frederik Frands Elias Tuxen (1837–1903)	23 May 1897	28 August 1899	2 years, 97 days	Hørring	
18		Major General; Johan Gustav Frederik Schnack (1839–1920)	28 August 1899	24 July 1901	1 year, 28 days	Hørring; Sehested	
20		Major General; Vilhelm Herman Oluf Madsen (1844–1917)	24 July 1901	14 January 1905	3 years, 174 days	Deuntzer	
21		Jens Christian Christensen (1856–1930)	14 January 1905	5 August 1905	234 days	Christensen I	
