= Anton Frederik Tscherning =

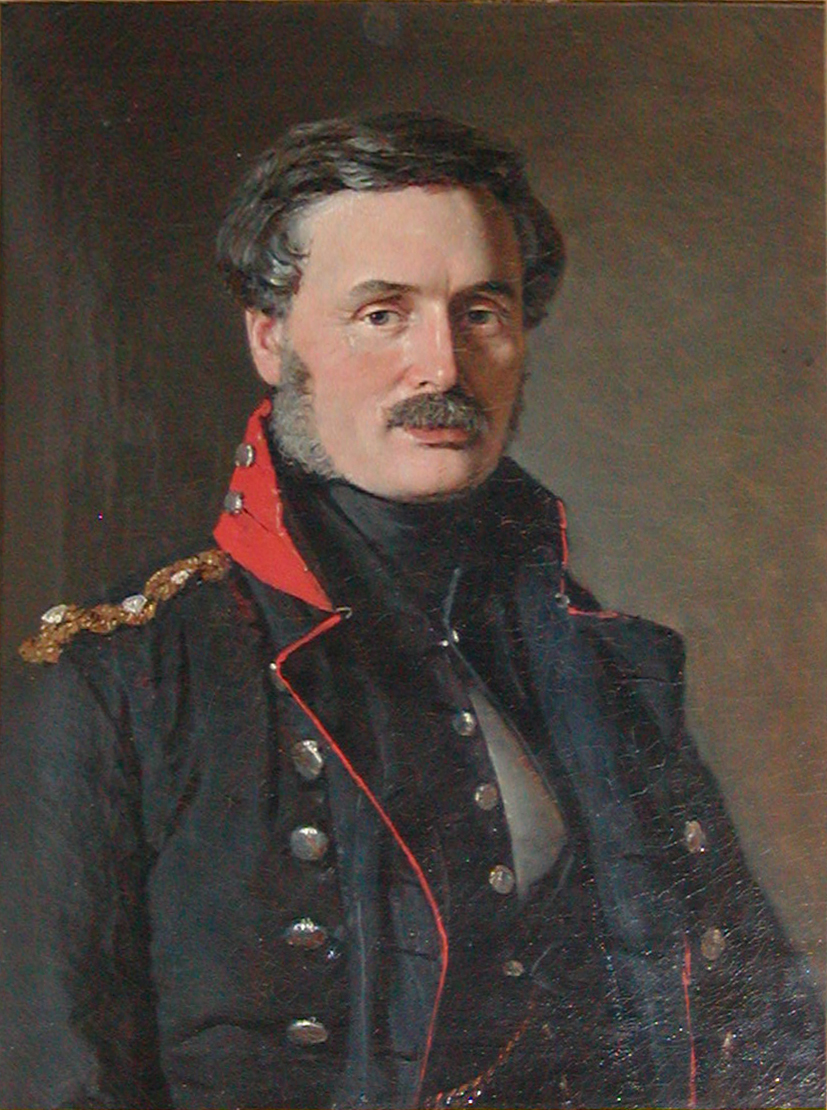
- Tscherning by Christian Albrecht Jensen, 1851

1st Minister of War
- In office 22 March 1848 – 16 November 1848
- Prime Minister: Adam Wilhelm Moltke
- Preceded by: Office established
- Succeeded by: Christian Frederik Hansen

Personal details
- Born: 12 December 1795 Frederiksværk, Zealand, Denmark
- Died: 29 June 1874 (aged 78) Copenhagen, Zealand, Denmark
- Party: Society of the Friends of Peasants
- Spouse: Eleonora von Lützow/Tscherning (1817–1890)
- Children: Marie Elisabeth (1847–1920); Anthonie Eleonore ("Anthonore" 1849–1926); Eilert Adam (1851–1919); Johan Andreas (1853–1918); Sara Birgitte (1855–1916)
- Parent(s): Eilert Tscherning (1767–1832); Marie von Lützow (1767–1830)
- Occupation: army officer politician
- Cabinet: Moltke I

Military service
- Allegiance: Denmark
- Branch/service: Royal Danish Army
- Years of service: 1828–1842
- Rank: Colonel

Ant(h)on Frederik Tscherning (12 December 1795 – 29 June 1874) was a Danish army officer who became a politician.

During the First Schleswig War he served, briefly, as Denmarks's first Minister for War between March and November in 1848. Tscherning rapidly organised of a military infrastructure which enabled the country to resist Prussian attack, but failed to distinguish himself as a military strategist. He was a member of the Folketing (Danish parliament) between 1849 and 1864 and of the Statsrådet (Council of State) between 1854 and 1864.

In his interventions he championed the liberal causes of the time, such as extension of democratic participation and free trade. During the 1860s, as the issue of Schleswig separatism forced itself to the top of the political agenda, he opposed the government policy of attempting uncompromisingly to impose Danish control in a region where, progressively, the German speaking minority was becoming a majority.

== Life ==
=== Provenance and early years ===
Tscherning was born in Frederiksværk during the run-up to Denmark's involvement in the Napoleonic Wars. Frederiksværk was a small town on Zealand with a large gun factory. The family could trace its origins back to Silesia from where they had migrated to Denmark at the time of the Religious Wars. Colonel Eilert Tscherning, his father, worked as an inspector at the town's important cannon and powder works. Like many war children, Tscherning was keen to join the fighting, enrolling for military training at the age of nine. The English attack on Copenhagen in 1807 intensified his soldierly ambitions. He enlisted as a cadet in 1809, emerging four years later as a second lieutenant of artillery. He was sent with the army to Holstein in 1813 and followed General von Kardorff into Germany, but his ambitions to become involved in the fighting were thwarted by the Treaty of Kiel, concluded in January 1814, which finally put an end to two decades of war.

Between 1816 and 1818 he served with a Danish company in northern France as part of the international army of occupation. He was based in Flanders, but was able to secure postings to Paris and to Metz which enabled him to engage in the academic study of science and, more specifically, of artillery warfare. He was also able to get to know Peter Andreas Heiberg (1758–1841), the egalitarian Danish born author and enlightenment scholar whose writings angered the Danish establishment, and who therefore lived out the second half of his life as a political exile in Paris. Tscherning and Heiberg became lifelong friends. Returning in 1818 he worked as a volunteer assistant to his father at the gun factory. However, he turned down the king's offer that he should take over from his father.

Tscherning rejoined the army in 1828. He was almost at once sent with a few fellow officers, including Christian Frederik Hansen and Otto Schlegel, to observe the French expeditionary force that had been sent to provide support in the Greek War of Independence. Not for the first time in his military career, by the time he arrived the fighting was over. The Egyptian troops had left. He nevertheless had the opportunity to join in, as a volunteer, with some fortification construction and other organisational work. He returned in 1829, stopping off for a period of further study in France before moving on, back to Copenhagen.

In Copenhagen, Tscherning was deployed to teach artillery cadets and appointed a member of the commission created to propose reforms to army training. When the new Military Academy opened in May 1830 he was appointed to a top teaching position in it, lecturing on artillery, his speciality. He won the respect of his students both through his technical knowledge and as a result of his human insights and teaching methods. In 1832 he was promoted to the rank of captain. However, Tscherning was a man of strong opinions on military matters and on the condition of Danish society more generally, and he was keen to share his views far beyond the confines of the classroom at the Copenhagen officers' academy.

=== The reformer ===
Tscherning was keen to stimulate a wider debate in the defence challenges facing the country. Although there was still a standing army in existence, its members were poorly remunerated and held in low esteem by wider Danish society. Several officers sought to raise the issue in public. Tscherning himself published no fewer than poor pamphlets on it between 1831 and 1833 in which he not merely set out the problems but also proposed solutions. In place of an isolated army, a sense of duty to defend the nation should be awakened in the population as a whole, applying a version of the French revolutionary idea of "the nation in arms". Those contributing to the nation's defence should enjoy better material support, just treatment by the state, promotion based fairly on merit and clear age limits. There was a host of other detailed reform proposals. Military style basic training should be integrated into education. Some of these ideas did not go unchallenged. There were those who felt that some of his ideas were impractical, that he under-estimated the importance of basic routine skills as necessary underpinnings for wartime preparedness, that his well reasoned strictures on military administration were not matched by strategic and tactical insight.

=== Exile ===
His ideas for reconfiguring the relationship between the army and the state failed to convince the wider political establishment. As he persisted, others from the military found practical objections to his proposals, while in general terms, an attack on the status quo came to be presented as an attack on the aging king. There were mutterings that he was spreading republican ideas. Tscherning, finding himself on the receiving end of a royal rebuke, offered to retire; but the king refused to accept his retirement, preferring to find a more subtle way to cool the debate. Tscherning was ordered to embark on a study trip which, as the king put it, would take a long time ("tage lang Tid"). For the next five years he visited a succession of countries in Europe, carefully studying their military administrative structures and sending home a succession of detailed reports which, he quickly became convinced, were ignored. He also sent letters about foreign military arrangements to publicly available journals, causing intense annoyance to the king and his chancelry. In 1838 Tscherning was informed that his study trip was completed and he was permitted/summoned to return home. On arriving back home he issued another booklet, arguing that the solution to the problem of integrating the military into the state apparatus must be part of a wider solution involving the reorganisation of the overall government structure and indeed something approaching a revitalisation of the national soul. He again applied to resign from the army but his application was turned down. Instead he went to France where he spent a couple of years working as a military engineer, appointed a battery commander in 1841.

=== Retirement from the army ===
In 1841/1842, at last, his application to resign from the army was accepted. Shortly before that he had a serious disagreement with fellow officers who objected to his proposals on promotion and deployment of junior officers. It was his growing unpopularity with fellow officers over the past few years which accounted for his failure at this point to gain further promotion above the rank of captain.

For the next few years Tscherning supported himself in the private sector, working with engineering and trading companies. There is also mention of his having undertaken architecture work. In addition, he participated in the political debates of the times as a journalist, continuing to advocate a more coherent approach to army reform, and beyond that topic establishing his credentials as a backer of a more "liberal" approach to government.

During this time he found time to marry. Four months short of his fiftieth birthday, on 27 August 1845 Anton Frederik Tscherning married Eleonora Christine Lützow. Despite being 22 years younger than he, the bride was his first cousin, although her father – Tscherning's maternal uncle, General Major Adam Tobias Lützow (1775–1844) – had acknowledged Eleonora as his daughter (and adopted her legally) only in 1837.

=== Minister for War ===
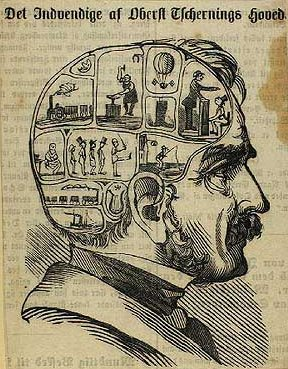
A contemporary caricature of Tscherning. The numerous chambers in his brain are intended to highlight the range of his various interests.

Having already gained a good knowledge of rural issues during his time in Frederiksværk, Tscherning became president of the Society of the Friends of Peasants on its foundation in 1846. This was a grouping that came together to press the case for political reform, with many of the features of a political party: Tscherning's acceptance of its leadership marked an important step along his path to a more overtly political role. He now played a leading part in events which culminated in what amounted to a quiet revolution in 1848/49. When King Christian died in January 1848 he was still an "absolutist monarch": After the wranglings that led to adoption of the written "June constitution" in 1849 his son, the popular Frederick VII, could be regarded as a "constitutional monarch". Following the dismissal of the Stemann government in March 1848, having promoted the constitutional conference of 1848, it was natural that Tscherning should be invited to join the new administration under Adam Wilhelm Moltke, and his public profile over military reform meant that the War Ministry was the appropriate department for him to take over, albeit in the face of opposition from the conservative military establishment. The king promoted him to the rank of colonel in the wake of victory against at Bov in April 1848, which was considered more appropriate than that of captain for the government's Minister for War (although relations between Tscherning and the king subsequently soured).

The Battle of Bov was the first significant conflict of the First Schleswig War which was essentially a separatist rebellion by Schleswig and Holstein, territories which formed the southern part of the Danish kingdom but which also had increasing links to Germany, intensified by migration pressures and a shifting language frontier. To the south Holstein had also, till its abolition in 1806, formed part of the Holy Roman Empire, and now combined its ties to the Danish crown with membership of the German Confederation. In a century of rising nationalism the tensions this situation created could only increase, and the rebellion took on the character of an international war when Prussia intervened on behalf of the separatists. By July the Danish army had succeeded in stopping the rebels and their Prussian allies, although the underlying tensions that had triggered the war remained unresolved. Tscherning was felt to have provided excellent leadership, demonstrating clarity of thought and abundant stamina. He might not have been loved by the conservative military leaders, but he did enjoy widespread political support in the country, especially in the rural areas where support for the Society of the Friends of Peasants was concentrated. He was able to prepare the way for universal military service. He found the political backing to transform the army into a single coherent fighting entity, taking care at a detailed level of training and health issues, and very quickly, through changing the personnel at the top of the army and through personal example, gaining the loyalty of the forces. By the time the government resigned, in November 1848, Denmark could call on a well coordinated army of approximately 30,000 men.

Tscherning's conduct of the war was not beyond criticism, however. There are suggestions that if he had maximised the forces sent to crush the rebellion that erupted in Holstein at the outset, the subsequent coming together of a separatist Schleswig-Holstein rebel force might have been avoided. There were occasions when disagreement at the top led to a lack of clarity over chains of command. Some of his strategic decisions were portrayed as gratuitously whimsical. However, he was also constrained by political considerations during the summer of 1848: the Danish government position was widely backed by foreign powers (aside from those in the German confederation), but there was a growing risk that allies might initiate peace talks on Denmark's behalf. When he resigned in November 1848 Tscherning was not convinced that a further three years of war was desirable and he increasingly came to the view that, while rebellion should be seen for what it was and put down accordingly, that did not mean that regional differences and language rights should be ignored. In political terms, his belief in democratic structures and principals was very much on display between 1849 and 1864, the years that he spent as a member of parliament. He also never lost his enthusiasm for military affairs, and never gave up on his belief in the "nation in arms" concept, in order to "holder Folket friskt og disciplinerer det" ("keep the people energetic and disciplined").

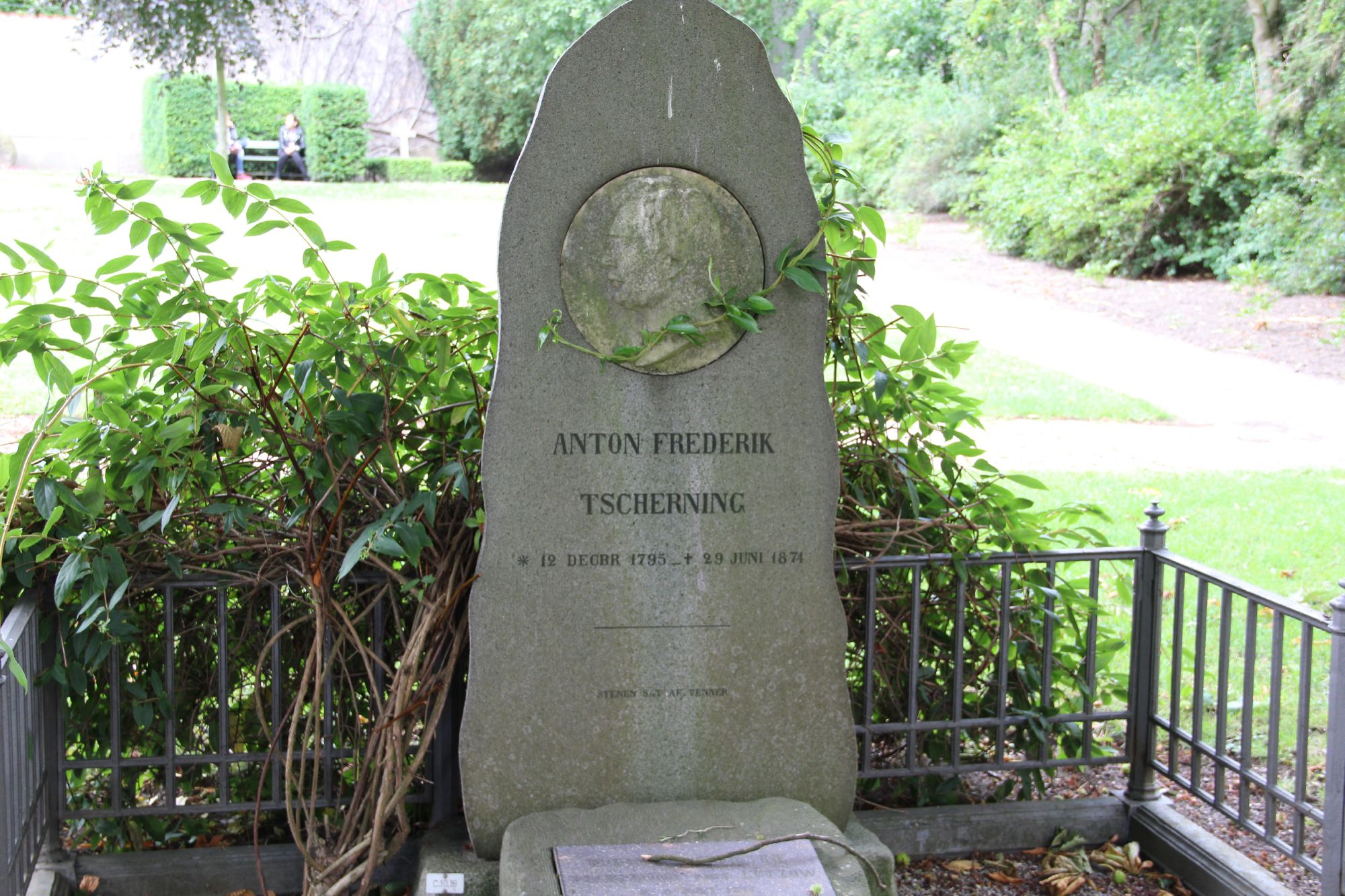
Tscherning's tombstone at the Garrison Cemetery in Copenhagen.

Tscherning died on 29 June 1874. He is buried at Copenhagen's Garrison Cemetery.
