= Overgaden Oven Vandet 52 =

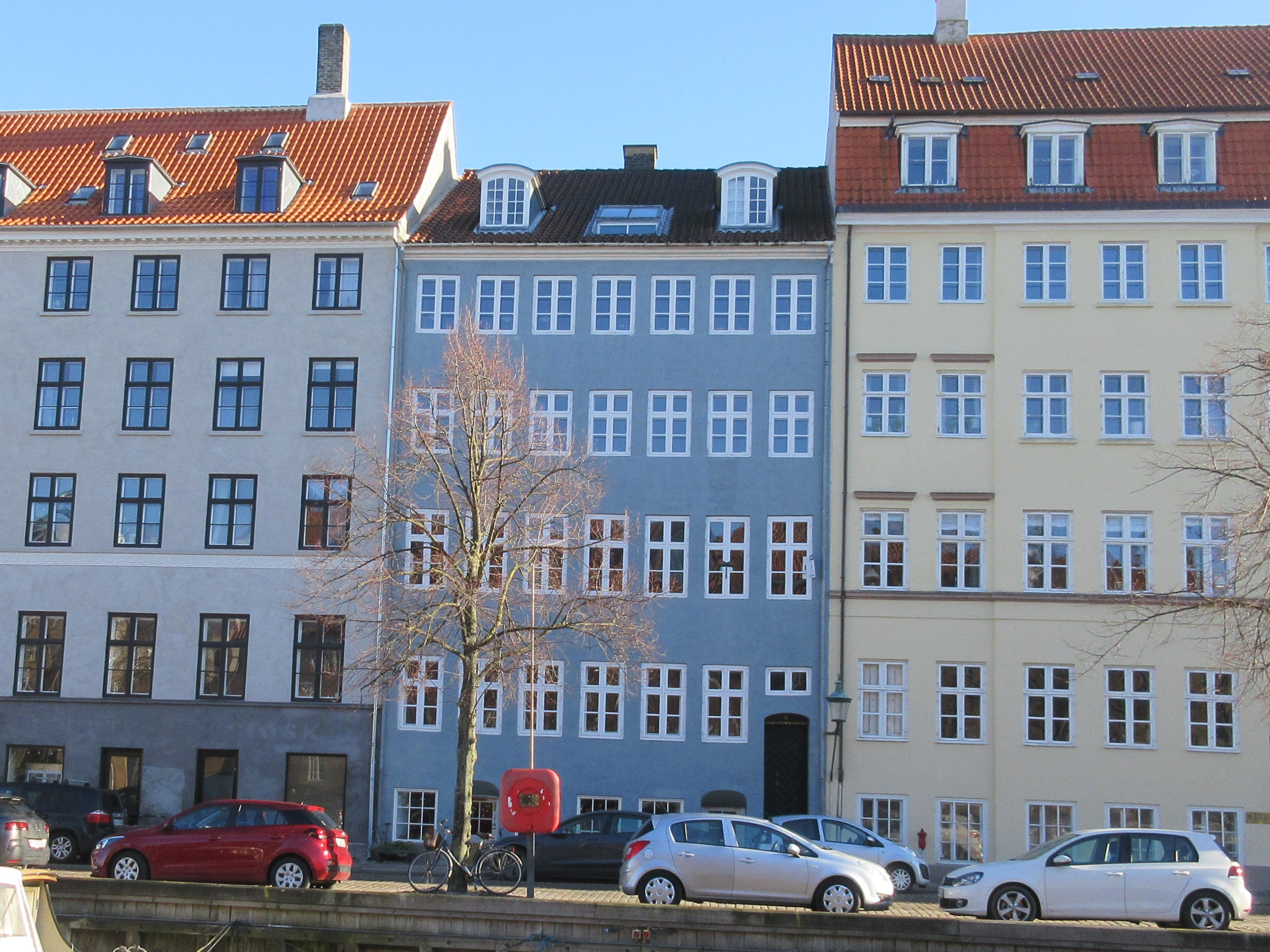

General information
- Location: Copenhagen
- Country: Denmark
- Coordinates: 55°40′26″N 12°35′37.57″E
- Completed: 1772
- Renovated: 1846 (heightened), 1953–55

Ovengaden Oven Vandet 52 is a mid 19th-century residential building overlooking Christianshavn Canal in the Christianshavn neighborhood of central Copenhagen, Denmark. The building was constructed in 1772 but heightened in 1846. It was listed in the Danish registry of protected buildings and places in 1945. Notable former residents include the botanist Erik Viborg, diplomat and politician Valdemar Rudolph von Raasløff and painter Edvard Weie.

== History ==
=== Early history ===
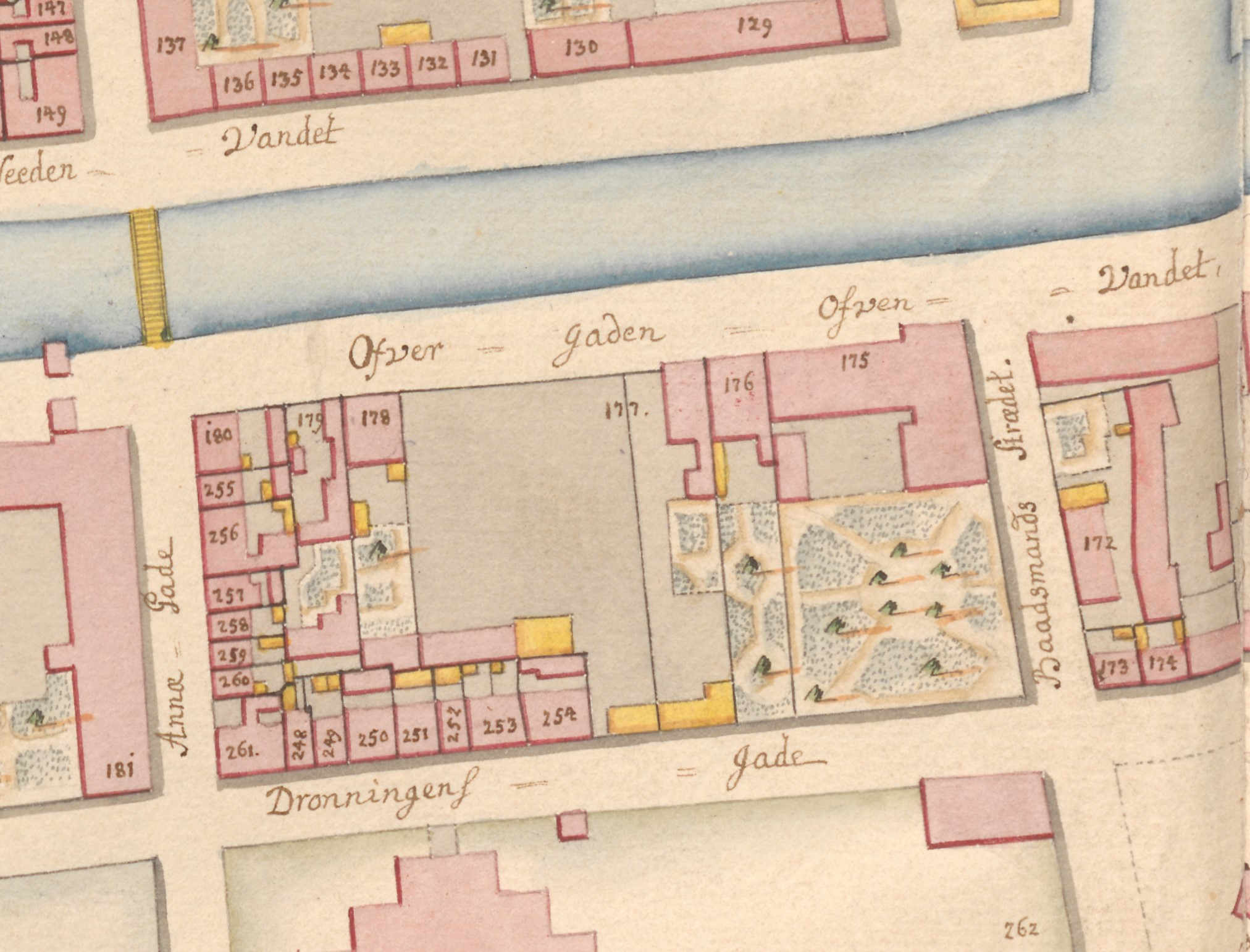
No. 176 seen on a detail from Christian Gedde's map of Christianshavn Quarter, 1757.

The site was originally part of the same property as Overgaden oven Vandet 54–56. The large property was initially owned by the crown. In 1641, it was ceded to Peder Gregersen. The property was listed as No. 96 in Christianshavn Quarter in Copenhagen's first cadastre of 1689 and was at that time owned by Hans Nansen the Younger (1635–1713). He was active in trade on Iceland. On 27 December 1670, he was appointed as member of Kommercekollegiet. In 1671, he was also appointed as a member of Admiralitetskollegiet. In 1688, he was appointed as president of Copenhagen. The property was later divided into two separate properties. The narrow southwestern property (now No. 52) was listed as No. 176 in the new cadastre of 1756 and was at that time owned by castor Michael Juel. A seven-bays-long, two-storey, half timbered building fronted the street. A back garden with fruit trees continued all the way to Dronningensgade on the other side of the block.

The property was later owned by Claus Petersen Themstrup. In 1772, he replaced the old timber-framed building with a new three-storey brick building. The facade was crowned by a three-bay gabled wall dormer with a pulley.

The property was home to 28 residents in three households at the 1676 census. Albert Hanibal Hassler, an auditor at Generalitetet with title of justitsråd, resided in the building with his wife Mette Kirstine Hintze, their three children (aged five to nine), his mother Agnethe Judith Hassler, his maternal aunt Anna Engel Lehn, a clerk and two maids. Peder Paludan, assistant pastor at Christian's Church, resided in the building with his wife Margretha Benedicte Tillerup, their four children (aged two to seven), his sister Anna Paludan and two maids. Christofer Jørgensen, a firewood trader, resided in the building with his wife Magdalene Klingenberg, their three children (aged two to six) and four lodgers.

The veterinarian and botanist Erik Nissen Viborg (1759–1822) was among the residents of the building from 1795 to 1798.

=== 19th century ===
The property was home to 10 residents in three households at the 1801 census. Albert Sebastian Hasler, now with title of general war commissioner, resided in the building with his wife Mette Kirstine Hasler and their son Henrich Hasler. Anne Engelke Lentz, a widow, resided in the building with a male servant and two maids. And. Espensen Beck, a cooper, resided in the building with his Maren Christensen and a fellow cooper.

The property was listed as No. 178 in the new cadastre of 1806. It was at that time still owned by Albert Sebastian Hassler.

Valdemar Rudolph von Raasløff, a later diplomat and politician, resided in the building in 1939.

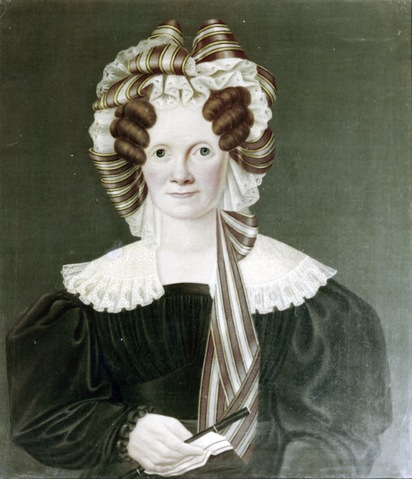
Juliane Marie Grønlund,

The property was home to 19 residents in four households at the 1840 census. Gustav Julius Wulff Borup (1808–1865), a businessman (grosserer), resided on the ground floor with his wife Catharine Margrethe Borup (née Køster), one male servant and one maid. Erik Norden Sølling (1802–1879, son of Peder Norden Pedersen Sølling), a royal bookkeeper, resided on the first floor with his wife Mathilde Henriette Frederikke Sølling (née Amnitzbøll)m their one-year-old son and two maids. Juliane Marie Grønlund, widow of birk judge i Hørsholm Jens Samuel Grønlund (1677–1822), resided on the second floor to the left with her four children (aged 15 to 21) and one maid. Ane Christine Giessing (née Brandrup), widow of Hans Samuel Giessing (1788–1826), resided on the second floor to the right with her four children (aged 18 to 27) and one maid.

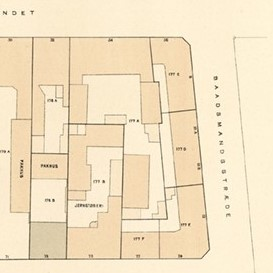
Overgaden Oven Vandet 52 seen to the left on a detail from a district plan from 1886.

In 1846, No, 178 was divided into No. 178A towards the canal and No. 178B towards Dronningensgade. The building fronting Overgaden was at the same time heightened to four storeys. The adjacent property (now Overgaden Oven Vandet 54–56) was at the same time densified in a similar manner by silj hat manufacturer H.P. Lorentzen.

No. 178A was home to 48 residents at the 1860 census. Johan Georg Kullerig, a master chimney sweeper, resided on the ground floor with his wife Caroline (née Lerche), their three children (aged seven to 13), one chimney sweeper, four chimney sweeper's apprentices and one maid. Poul Wormback, a school principal, resided on the first floor with his wife Marie Cathrine Mathilde (née Hansen), his niece Mathilde Petersen and one maid. Jens Martinus Frederiksen, a saddler, resided on the third floor with his wife Ane Sophie Frederikke (née Nielsen) and their three children (aged one to seven). Anders Jensen, a haulier, resided on the third floor with his wife Magdalene (née Eriksen= and their three-year-old daughter. Peter Andreas Carlsen, a klein smith, resided on the third floor with his wife Emilie Bolette Oline Cathrine (née Olsen). Petrine Emilie Magdalene Andersen (née Smidt), a divorced woman employed with needlework), resided on the third floor with her three children (aged one to five). Ludvig Svendsen, a tailor, resided in the garret with his wife Vilhelmine Caroline (née Jannerich) and their four children (aged six to 16). Magnus Jensen, a joiner, resided in the garret with his wife Ane Caroline (née Andersen) and their four children (aged one to seven). Niels Jensen, an innkeeper, resided in the basement with his wife Karen (née Schmidt) and one lodger (workman). Egelius Petersen, a klein smith, resided in the basement with his wife Ane Cathrine (née Jacobsen) and their two children (aged one and two). The side wing was home to another 15 residents. Johan Frederik Blen, an innkeeper, resided on the ground floor of the side wing with his wife Karen (née Olsdatter) and two sons from the wife's first marriage (aged 18 and 23). Carl Frederik Ferdinand Schedin, a shoemaker, resided in the building with his wife Maren Emilie (née Jensen) and their three daughters (aged nine to 14). Rasmus Thomsen, a workman resided on the third floor with his wife Christiane Thomsen (née Johnsen), their two daughters (aged 14 and 21) and two lodgers.

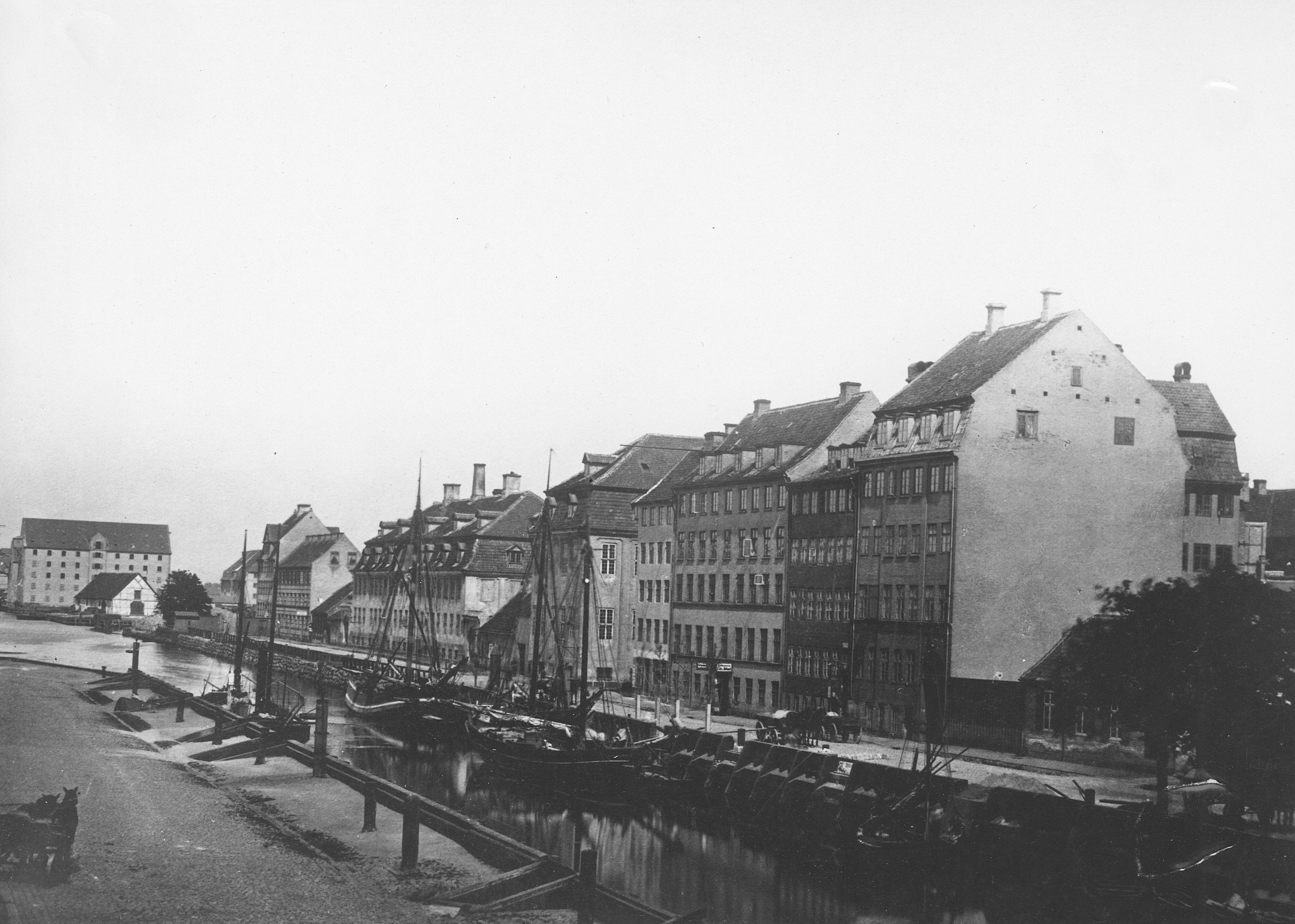
The building seen on a photo from 1865. The building with the exposed gable in the foreground is No.51. Then empty lot was later used for the construction of Bombebøssen.

The property was home to 79 residents at the 1880 census. Jørgen Jørgensen, a haulier, resided on the ground floor with his wife Anna Jørgensen, a grandson and three lodgers. Carl Frederik Schedin, a shoemaker, resided on the first floor with his wife Maren Emilie Schedinand their 31-year-old daughter Caroline Mathilde Schedin. Julius Rigstrup, a businessman (handelsagent(m resided on the first floor with his wife Marie Louise Rigstrup and their two children (aged one and two). Nielsine Jensen, a divorced seamstress, resided on the second floor with her four children (aged one to 16) and three lodgers. Jens Nielsen Nygaard, an employee at the Port of Copenhagen, resided on the second floor with his wife Anne Marie Nygaard, their two children (aged 13 and 20) and two lodgers. Charles Emil Petersen, a building painter, resided on the third floor with his wife Olivia Regine Petersen and their two-year-old daughter. Karen Hansen, a widow tobacco worker, resided on the third floor with her three children (aged nine to 19). Rasmus Nielsen, a coachman, resided on the third floor with his wife Karen Nielsen and their 29-year-old daughter Mathilde Nielsen (seamstress). Hans Peter Wahl, a fireman, resided on the third floor with his wife Emilie Wahl and four children (aged one to five). Frederik Vilhelm Jespersen, a workman, resided in the garret with his wife Inger Marie Jespersen and their four children (aged four to 14). Hans Peter Gorell, a baker, resided in the garret with his wife Emma Magdalene Rygaard and their two children (aged four and six). Jens Mortensen, an innkeeper, resided in the basement with his wife Anna Marie Mortensen, their two children (aged one and three) and one maid. Frederik Hein, machinist, resided on the first floor of the side wing with his wife Cecilie Charlotte Hein. Jacob Christensen, a mason, resided on the second floor of the side wing with his wife Ane Sophie Christensen, their six children (aged 10 to 20) and a fellow mason. Thomas Seierup, a smith, resided in the basement of the side wing with his wife Anna Marie Seierup and their four children (aged one to nine).

=== 20th century ===
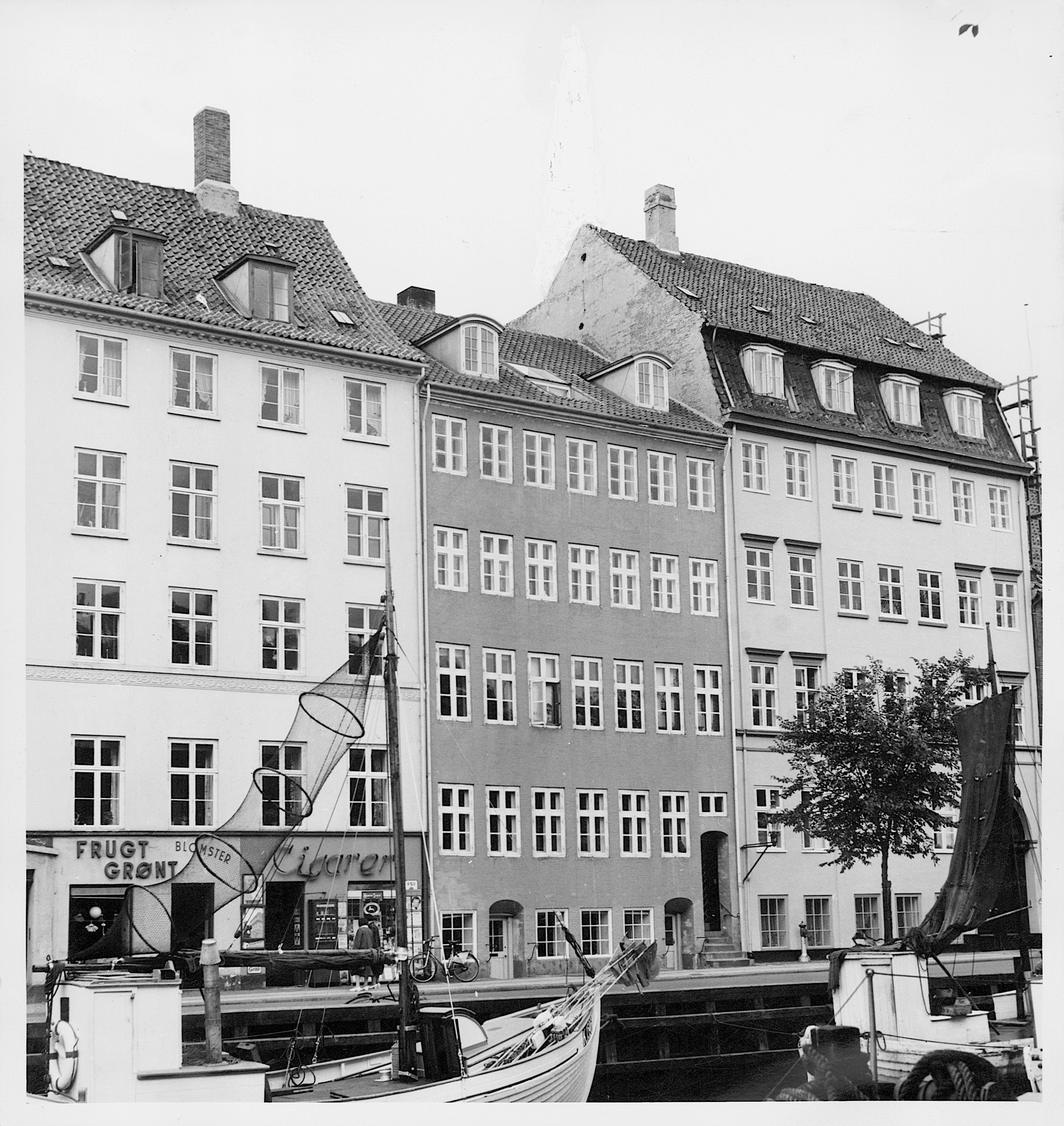
The building in 1956.

The painter Edvard Weie (1879–1943) resided on and off in one of the fourth floor apartments in the period 1901 to 1908.

The building was listed in the Danish registry of protected buildings and places in 1945. In 1953–55, it was subject to a comprehensive renovation undertaken by the architect Hans Henrik Engqvistl.

== Architecture ==
The building is constructed in brick on a plinth of granite ashlars with four storeys over a walk-out basement. The seven bays wide facade is plastered and painted blue with white-painted window frames and a white-painted cornice.. The main entrance in the bay furthest to the right (southwest) is placed in a flat-arched niche and reached via a flight of five granite steps. The door is topped by a transom window with the house number. An inscription on the transom reads "Bygget 1772, restaureret 1962" (English: Built 1772, restored 1962). An old gas lamp is mounted on the wall next to the doorway. The original basement entrance is located in the bay next to the main entrance. A second basement entrance in the second bay from the left (northeast) was created in connection with the 1962–53 renovation.

Two side wings extends from the rear side of the building along each their side of the narrow courtyard. The rear side of the front wing and the facades of the two side wings are all rendered yellow. The longer southwestern side wing is three storeys tall and topped by a monopitched red tile roof. The shorter northeastern side wing is just two storeys tall and also topped by a monopitched red tile roof.

== Today ==
The building is today owned by E/F Overgaden Oven Vandet 52, It contains a shop in the basement and condominiums on the upper floors of the front wing. The southwestern side wing contains a single condominium on each floor. The northeastern side wing is part of the condominiums in the front wing to the left.

== Cultural references ==
The building was used as a location in the feature films Kriminalsagen Tove Andersen (1953), Pigen og vandpytten (1958), and Han, hun, Dirch og Dario (1962). It was also used as a location in episode 58 of the DR television series Huset på Christianshavn.
