= Kultus Minister (Denmark) =

- Kultusminister
- State Coat of Arms of the Kingdom of Denmark

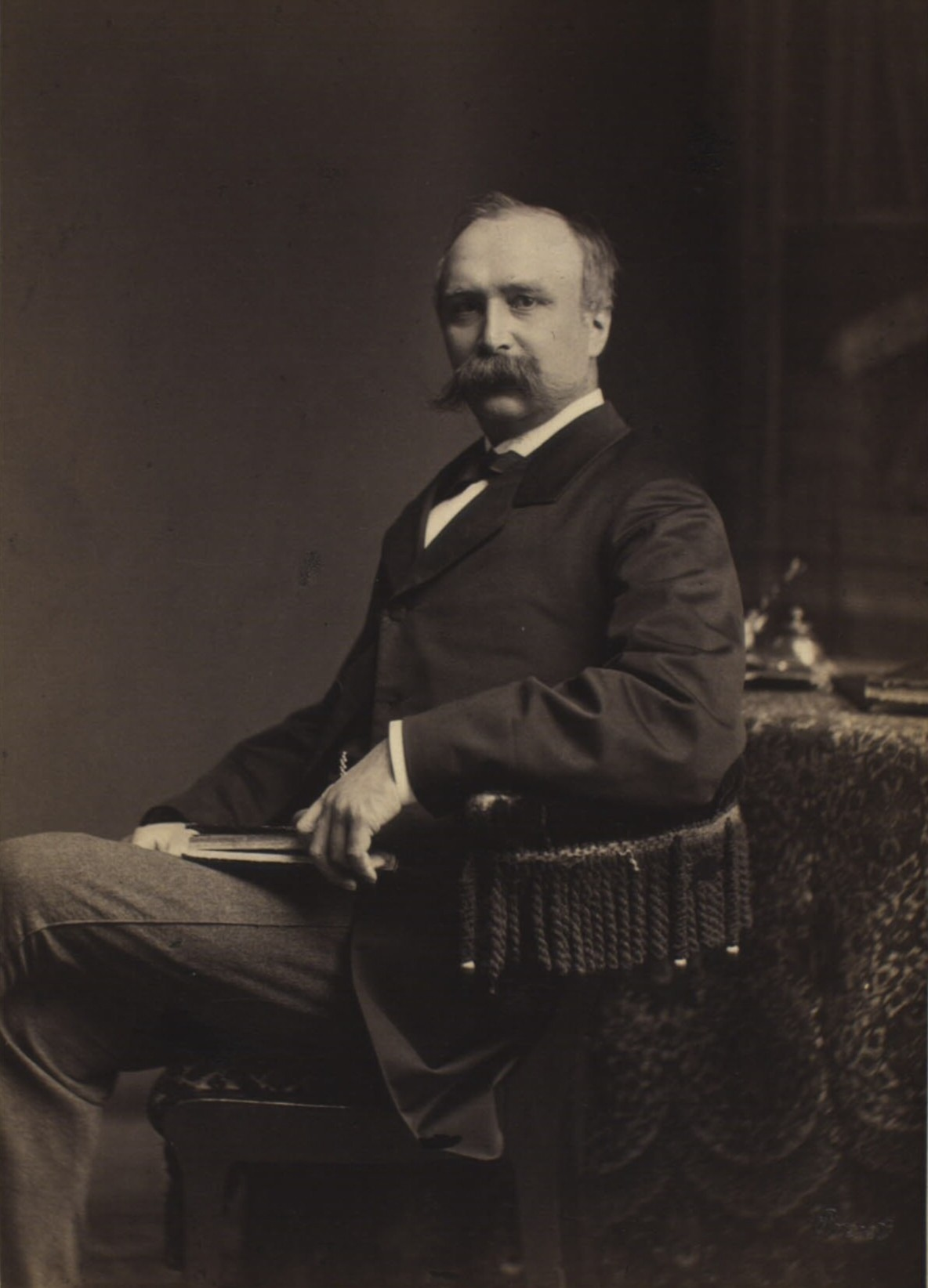
- Longest serving Jacob Scavenius; 24 August 1880 – 6 July 1891
- Type: Minister
- Member of: Cabinet; State Council
- Reports to: the prime minister
- Seat: Slotsholmen
- Appointer: The Monarch (on the advice of the prime minister)
- Formation: 22 March 1848
- First holder: Ditlev Gothard Monrad
- Final holder: Søren Keiser-Nielsen
- Abolished: 28 April 1916
- Superseded by: Minister for Ecclesiastical Affairs; Minister of Education
- Deputy: Permanent Secretary

The Kultus Minister of Denmark (Danish: Kultusminister) was a Danish minister office. The responsibilities of the minister was the church, culture and education. The word kultus comes from cultus, Latin for adoration from which the words culture and cult are derived.

In 1916, the office was split up into an Education Minister and a Church Minister. The new Church Minister had responsibility for culture, a task transferred to the Minister for Cultural Affairs in 1961.

== List of ministers ==
=== Ministers under Frederick VII (1848–1863) ===
No.	Portrait	Name (born-died)	Term of office			Political party	Government	Ref.
No.	Portrait	Name (born-died)	Took office	Left office	Time in office	Political party	Government	Ref.
1		Ditlev Gothard Monrad (1811–1887)	22 March 1848	16 November 1848	239 days	National Liberal	Moltke I	
2		Johan Nicolai Madvig (1804–1886)	16 November 1848	7 December 1851	3 years, 22 days	National Liberal	Moltke II–III–IV	
3		Peter Georg Bang (1797–1861)	7 December 1851	3 June 1852	179 days	Independent	Moltke IV; Bluhme I	
4		Carl Frederik Simony (1806–1872)	3 June 1852	21 April 1853	322 days	National Liberal	Bluhme I	
5		Anders Sandøe Ørsted (1778–1860)	21 April 1853	12 December 1854	1 year, 235 days	Independent	Ørsted	
6		Carl Christian Hall (1812–1888)	12 December 1854	6 May 1859	4 years, 145 days	National Liberal	Bang; Andræ; Hall I	
(1)		Ditlev Gothard Monrad (1811–1887)	6 May 1859	2 December 1859	210 days	National Liberal	Hall I	
7		Vilhelm August Borgen (1801–1884)	2 December 1859	24 February 1860	84 days	Society of the Friends of Peasants	Rotwitt	
(1)		Ditlev Gothard Monrad (1811–1887)	24 February 1860	31 December 1863	3 years, 310 days	National Liberal	Hall II	

=== Ministers under Christian IX (1863–1906) ===
No.	Portrait	Name (born-died)	Term of office			Political party	Government	Ref.
No.	Portrait	Name (born-died)	Took office	Left office	Time in office	Political party	Government	Ref.
8		Christian Thorning Engelstoft (1805–1889)	31 December 1863	11 July 1864	193 days	Independent	Monrad	
9		Eugenius Sophus Ernst Heltzen (1818–1898)	11 July 1864	30 March 1865	262 days	Højre	Bluhme II	
–		George Quaade (1813–1889) acting	30 March 1865	7 April 1865	8 days	Independent	Bluhme II	
10		Cosmus Bræstrup (1789–1870)	7 April 1865	6 November 1865	213 days	Højre	Bluhme II	
11		Theodor Rosenørn-Teilmann (1817–1879)	6 November 1865	4 September 1867	1 year, 302 days	Independent	Krag-Juel-Vind-Frijs	
12		Peter Kierkegaard (1805–1888)	4 September 1867	6 March 1868	184 days	Independent	Krag-Juel-Vind-Frijs	
–		Christen Andreas Fonnesbech (1817–1880) acting	6 March 1868	15 March 1868	9 days	National Landowners	Krag-Juel-Vind-Frijs	
13		Aleth Sophus Hansen (1817–1889)	15 March 1868	22 September 1869	1 year, 191 days	Independent	Krag-Juel-Vind-Frijs	
14		Ernst Emil Rosenørn (1810–1894)	22 September 1869	28 May 1870	248 days	Independent	Krag-Juel-Vind-Frijs	
15		Carl Christian Hall (1812–1888)	28 May 1870	14 July 1874	4 years, 47 days	National Liberal Party	Holstein-Holsteinborg	
16		Jens Jacob Asmussen Worsaae (1821–1885)	14 July 1874	11 June 1875	332 days	Independent	Fonnesbech	
17		Johan Christian Henrik Fischer (1814–1885)	11 June 1875	24 August 1880	5 years, 74 days	National Landowners	Estrup	
18		Jacob Frederik Scavenius (1833–1915)	24 August 1880	6 July 1891	10 years, 316 days	Højre	Estrup	
–		Johannes Nellemann (1831–1906) acting	6 July 1891	10 July 1891	4 days	Højre	Estrup	
19		Carl Goos (1835–1917)	10 July 1891	7 August 1894	3 years, 28 days	Højre	Estrup	
20		Vilhelm Bardenfleth (1850–1933)	7 August 1894	23 May 1897	2 years, 289 days	Højre	Reedtz-Thott	
21		Hans Valdemar Sthyr (1838–1905)	23 May 1897	27 April 1900	2 years, 339 days	Højre	Hørring	
22		Jens Jacobsen Kokholm Bjerre (1847–1901)	27 April 1900	24 July 1901	1 year, 88 days	Højre	Sehested	
23		Jens Christian Christensen (1856–1930)	24 July 1901	14 January 1905	3 years, 174 days	Venstre Reform Party	Deuntzer	
24		Enevold Sørensen (1850–1920)	14 January 1905	28 October 1909	4 years, 287 days	Venstre Reform Party	Christensen I–II; Neergaard I Holstein-Ledreborg	

=== Ministers under Frederik VIII (1906–1912) ===
No.	Portrait	Name (born-died)	Term of office			Political party	Government	Ref.
No.	Portrait	Name (born-died)	Took office	Left office	Time in office	Political party	Government	Ref.
25		M. C. B. Nielsen (1847–1930)	28 October 1909	5 July 1910	250 days	Social Liberal	Zahle I	
25		Jakob Lindberg Appel (1866–1931)	5 July 1910	21 June 1913	2 years, 351 days	Venstre	Berntsen	

=== Ministers under Christian X (1912–1947) ===
No.	Portrait	Name (born–died)	Term of office			Political party	Government	Ref.
No.	Portrait	Name (born–died)	Took office	Left office	Time in office	Political party	Government	Ref.
27		Søren Keiser-Nielsen (1856–1926)	21 June 1913	28 April 1916	2 years, 312 days	Social Liberal	Zahle II	
