= Moltke II cabinet =

Danish government from 1848 to 1851

Moltke's second cabinet
- 2nd Cabinet of Denmark

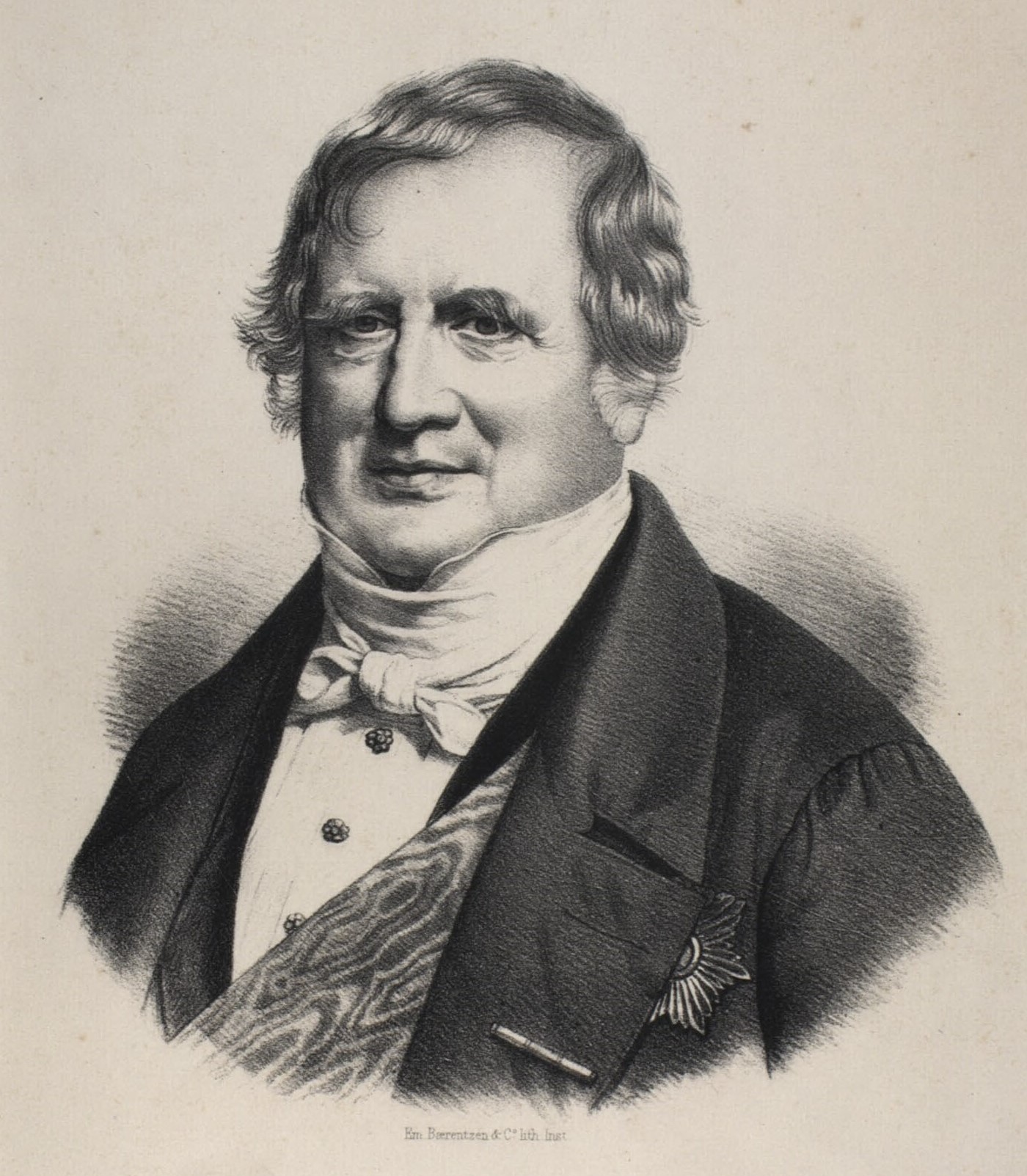
- Date formed: 15 November 1848
- Date dissolved: 13 July 1851

People and organisations
- Head of state: Frederick VII
- Head of government: Adam Wilhelm Moltke
- No. of ministers: 10
- Total no. of members: 13
- Member party: Independents; National Liberal Party

History
- Election: 1849
- Predecessor: Moltke I
- Successor: Moltke III

The Moltke II cabinet was the government of Denmark from 16 November 1848 to 13 July 1851. It was also referred to as the November Cabinet.

It was replaced by the Moltke III cabinet on 13 July 1851.

== List of ministers and portfolios ==
Some of the terms in the table end after 15 November 1848 because the minister was in the Cabinet of Moltke II as well.

Cabinet members
Portfolio	Minister	Took office	Left office	Party
Prime Minister	Adam Wilhelm Moltke	22 March 1848	28 January 1852	Nonpartisan
Minister of Foreign Affairs	Adam Wilhelm Moltke	16 November 1848	6 August 1850	Nonpartisan
Minister of Foreign Affairs	Holger Christian Reedtz	6 August 1850	18 October 1851	Nonpartisan
Minister for Finance	Wilhelm Sponneck	16 November 1848	12 December 1854	Nonpartisan
Minister of the Interior	Peter Georg Bang	16 November 1848	21 September 1848	Nonpartisan
Minister of the Interior	Mathias Hans Rosenørn	21 September 1848	13 July 1851	Nonpartisan
Minister of Justice	Carl Emil Bardenfleth	22 March 1848	13 July 1851	Nonpartisan
Kultus Minister	Johan Nicolai Madvig	16 November 1848	7 December 1851	National Liberal
Minister of War	Christian Frederik von Hansen	16 November 1848	13 July 1851	Nonpartisan
Minister of the Navy	Christian Christopher Zarthmann	6 April 1848	10 August 1850	Nonpartisan
Minister of the Navy	Carl Ludvig Christian Irminger	10 August 1850	25 November 1850	Nonpartisan
Minister of the Navy	Carl Edvard van Dockum	25 November 1850	28 January 1852	Nonpartisan
Minister for Schleswig	Frederik Ferdinand Tillisch	5 March 1851	13 July 1851	Nonpartisan
Minister without portfolio	Henrik Nicolai Clausen	16 November 1848	13 July 1851	National Liberal

Preceded by Moltke I	Cabinet of Denmark; 16 November 1848 – 13 July 1851	Succeeded by Moltke III
