= Valdemar Rudolph von Raasløff =

Danish diplomat (1815–1883)

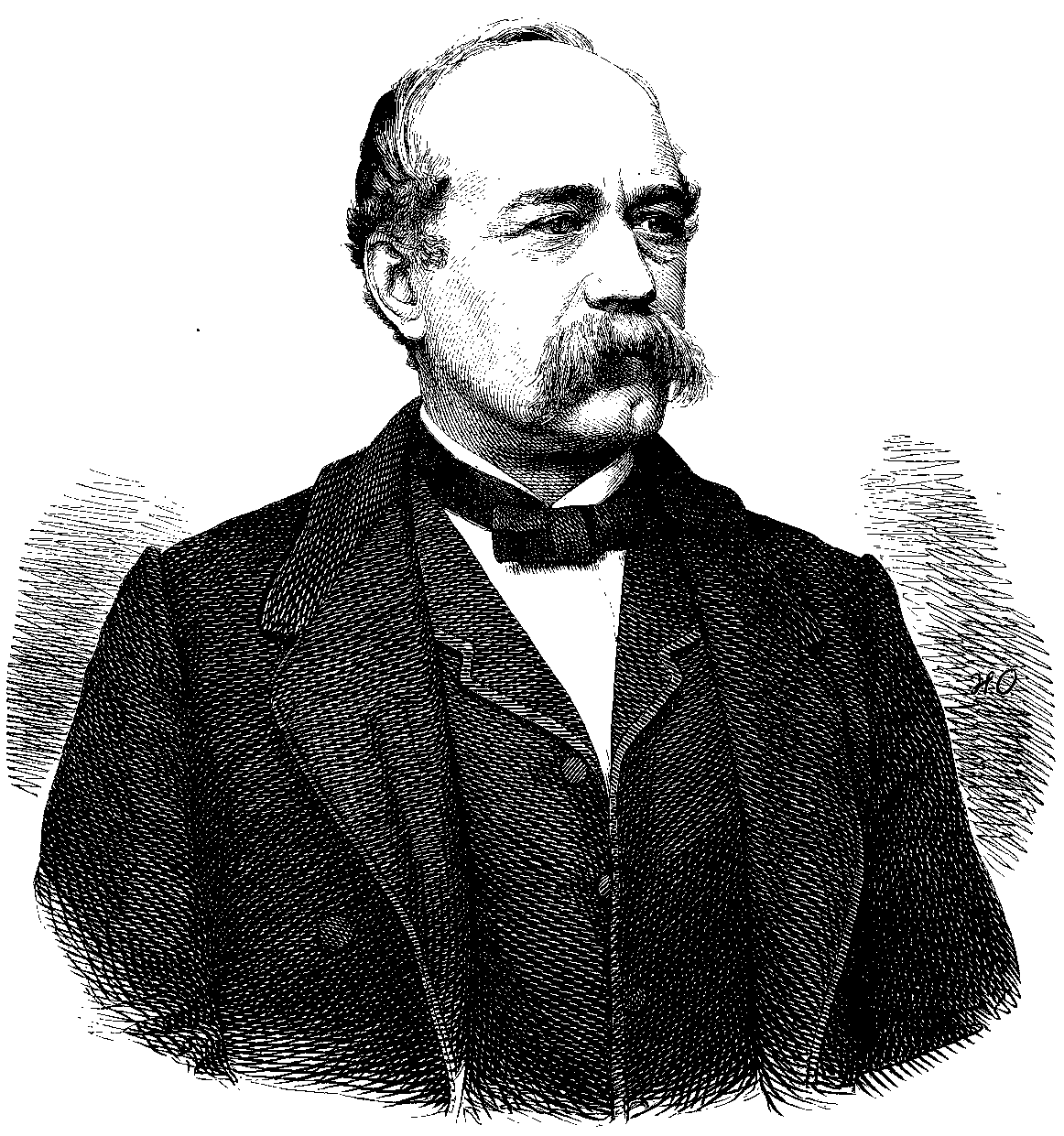

Minister of War
- In office 1 October 1866 – 19 April 1870
- Monarch: Christian IX
- Prime Minister: Christian Emil Krag-Juel-Vind-Frijs
- Preceded by: Johan Waldemar Neergaard
- Succeeded by: Wolfgang von Haffner

Minister for the Navy
- In office 22 September 1869 – 19 April 1870
- Monarch: Christian IX
- Prime Minister: Christian Emil Krag-Juel-Vind-Frijs
- Preceded by: Otto Frederik Suenson
- Succeeded by: Wolfgang von Haffner

Personal details
- Born: 6 November 1815 Altona, Hamburg
- Died: 14 February 1883 (aged 67) Passy, Paris

Military service
- Allegiance: Denmark; France
- Branch/service: Royal Danish Army; French Army
- Years of service: 1832–1851
- Battles/wars: First War of Schleswig

Valdemar Rudolph von Raasløff (6 November 1815 – 14 February 1883) was a Danish politician, military officer, and diplomat.

== Biography ==
Raasløff was born at Altona in the Duchy of Holstein. He spent his school years at Sorø and in 1832 he was admitted to the Royal Military College (Kgl. Militære Højskole), from which he graduated in 1838 as second lieutenant in the artillery.

Instead of serving in Denmark, he applied for service abroad and in 1840–41 he served in the French Army in Algeria. He later summarized his experiences in Algeria in a book, which was translated into several languages. In 1849–50, he served as captain in the Danish army in the First War of Schleswig, however, in 1851, he left the military in order to go to America and become an engineer.

In 1857, he was appointed Denmark's Minister Resident in Washington, DC. On behalf of King Christian IX, he concluded the first commercial treaty between Denmark and the Qing Empire on 13 July 1863, a treaty which was modeled on the Treaties of Tianjin and governed the relationship between the two countries for several decades. Between 1 October 1866 and 19 April 1870, he served as the War Minister of Denmark. He died during 1883 in Paris.

== Other sources ==
- Raaslöff, Waldemar Rudolph von. Rückblick auf die militarischen und politischen Verhältnisse der Algérie in den Jahren 1840 und 1841. Altona, J. F. Hammerich, 1845.
- Svend Dahl og P. Engelstoft, eds. Dansk biografisk haandleksikon. Kjøbenhavn og Kristiania, Glydendal, Nordisk forlag, 1920–26.

Political offices
| Preceded by Johan Waldemar Neergaard | War Minister of Denmark; 1 October 1866 – 19 April 1870 | Succeeded by Christian Emil Krag-Juel-Vind-Frijs |
