= Estrup cabinet =

Danish government from 1875 to 1894

Estrup's cabinet
- 17th Cabinet of Denmark

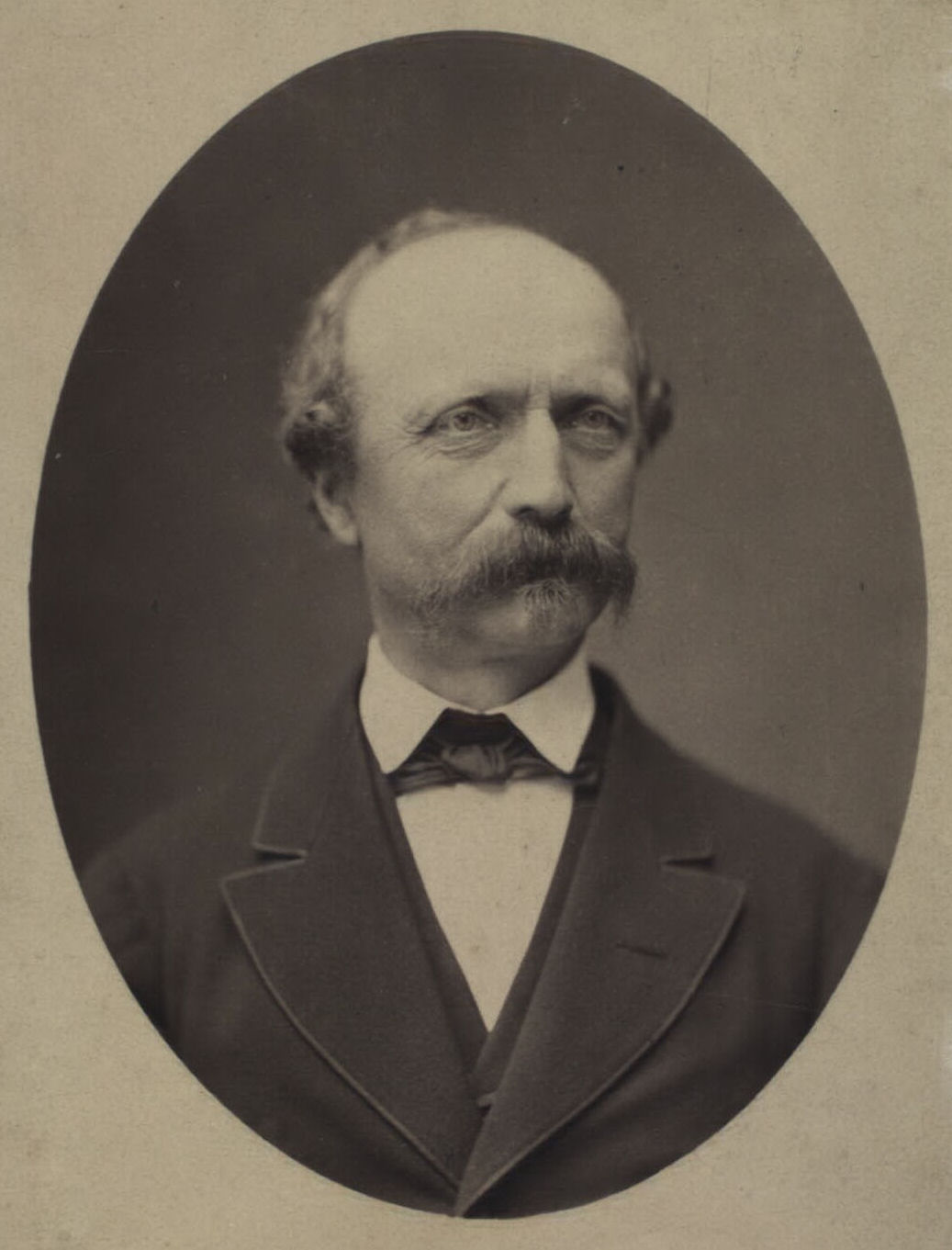
- Date formed: 11 June 1875
- Date dissolved: 7 August 1894

People and organisations
- Head of state: Christian IX of Denmark
- Head of government: Jacob Brønnum Scavenius Estrup
- No. of ministers: 8
- Ministers removed: 9
- Total no. of members: 17

History
- Elections: 1876; 1879; May 1881; Jul. 1881; 1884; 1887; 1890; 1892
- Outgoing election: 1895 Danish Folketing election
- Predecessor: Fonnesbech
- Successor: Reedtz-Thott

The Estrup cabinet was the government of Denmark from 11 June 1875 to 7 August 1894. It replaced the Fonnesbech cabinet and was succeeded by the Reedtz-Thott cabinet on 7 August 1894. It is the longest sitting government in Danish history.

== List of ministers and portfolios ==
Some of the terms in the table end after 7 August 1894 because the minister was in the Reedtz-Thott cabinet as well.

Cabinet members
Portfolio	Minister	Took office	Left office	Party
Council President	Jacob Brønnum Scavenius Estrup	11 June 1875	7 August 1894	Højre
Foreign Minister	Frederik Julius Moltke	11 June 1875	1 October 1875	National Landowners
Foreign Minister	Otto Rosenørn-Lehn	1 October 1875	21 May 1892	National Landowners
Foreign Minister	Tage Reedtz-Thott	21 May 1892	23 May 1897	Højre
Interior Minister	Erik Skeel	11 June 1875	29 August 1884	Højre
Interior Minister	Hilmar Finsen	29 August 1884	8 August 1885	Højre
Interior Minister	Hans Peter Ingerslev	8 August 1885	15 January 1894	Højre
Interior Minister	Hugo Egmont Hørring	15 January 1894	23 May 1897	Højre
Justice Minister and Minister for Iceland	Johannes Nellemann	11 June 1875	7 August 1894	Højre
Kultus Minister	Johan Christian Henrik Fischer	11 June 1875	24 August 1880	Højre
Kultus Minister	Jacob Frederik Scavenius	24 August 1880	6 July 1891	Højre
Kultus Minister	Johannes Nellemann	6 July 1891	10 July 1891	Højre
Kultus Minister	August Hermann Ferdinand Carl Goos	10 July 1891	7 August 1894	Højre
Minister of War	Wolfgang von Haffner	11 July 1875	28 July 1877	Højre
Minister of War	Johan Christopher Frederik Dreyer	28 July 1877	4 January 1879	Højre
Minister of War	Vilhelm Frederik Ludvig Kauffmann	4 January 1879	1 April 1881	Højre
Minister of War	Niels Frederik Ravn	1 April 1881	12 September 1884	Højre
Minister of War	Jesper Jespersen von Bahnson	12 September 1884	7 August 1894	Højre
Navy Minister	Wolfgang von Haffner	11 July 1875	28 July 1877	Højre
Navy Minister	Johan Christopher Frederik Dreyer	28 July 1877	4 January 1879	Højre
Navy Minister	Niels Frederik Ravn	4 January 1879	27 April 1900	Højre
Minister of Public Works
Minister of Public Works	Hans Peter Ingerslev	15 January 1894	7 August 1894	Højre

Preceded by Fonnesbech	Cabinet of Denmark; 11 June 1875 − 7 August 1894	Succeeded by Reedtz-Thott
