= Peter Kierkegaard =

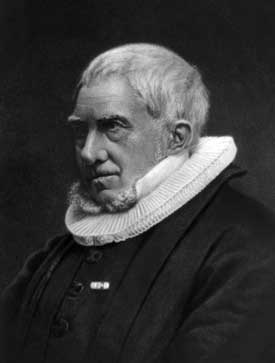
Peter Christian Kierkegaard

Peter Christian Kierkegaard (Danish pronunciation: [ˈpʰe̝ˀtɐ ˈkʰʁestjæn ˈkʰiɐ̯kəˌkɒˀ, - ˈkʰʁæs-]; 6 July 1805 – 24 February 1888), was a Danish theologian, politician and Bishop of Diocese of Aalborg from 1857 until 1875.

== Early life ==
He was born at Aalborg, Denmark as the son of Michael Pedersen Kierkegaard (1756–1838) and his second wife Ane Sørensdatter Lund (1768–1834). His father was a wealthy wool farmer and real estate speculator. One of seven children, Peter Kierkegaard was the elder brother of theologian and philosopher Søren Kierkegaard (1813–1855). In 1822 he graduated from the University of Copenhagen and in 1826 he became cand.theol.

In 1829 defended his dissertation at the university of Göttingen. He subsequently conducted a study trip to Bonn, Utrecht, Leuven (Louvain) and Paris. The following years he supported himself by teaching classical languages at the Borgerdydskolen in Copenhagen.

== Career ==
In 1833, he was appointed parish priest at Vejerslev-Blidstrup in Morsø Municipality. From 1842, he was parish priest for Pedersborg and Kindertofte at Sorø. In 1856 he was appointed Bishop of the Diocese of Aalborg.

As a theologian of the official Church of Denmark, he had on several occasions criticized his brother's works, notably at the synod conventions at Roskilde in 1849 and 1855. However, he later delivered the eulogy for his brother at Vor Frue Kirke.

He was elected to the Landsting in December 1849. From 4 September 1867 until 6 March 1868, he was Kultus Minister of Denmark in the Frijs Cabinet.

== Personal life ==
In 1836, Kierkegaard married Elise Marie Boisen (1806–1837) who died childless the following year. In 1841, he married Sophie Henriette Glahn (1809–1881). They had one child, Pascal Poul Egede Kierkegaard (1842–1915).

== Death ==
He died at Aalborg during 1888 and was buried in Almen Kirkegård. He was 82.

== Sources ==
- Kirmmse, Bruce H.. Encounters with Kierkegaard: A Life as Seen by His Contemporaries, Princeton University Press, 1996, ISBN 0-691-05894-6.
- Kierkegaard, Peter Christian. Samlede skrifter. København, K. Schønberg, 1902–1905.
- Kierkegaard, Peter Christian. Exstaticus. Søren Kierkegaards sidste Kamp, derunder hans Forhold til Broderen. (Peter Christian Kierkegaards Foredrag i Roskilde Konvent 5. Juli 1855, gengivet af ham selv). Ved Otto Holmgaard. København, Nyt Nordisk Forlag, 1967.

Political offices
Preceded by Christian Peter Theodor Rosenørn–Teilmann	Kultus Minister of Denmark; 4 September 1867 – 6 March 1868	Succeeded by Christian Andreas Fonnesbech
