= Ditlev Gothard Monrad =

Danish Politician

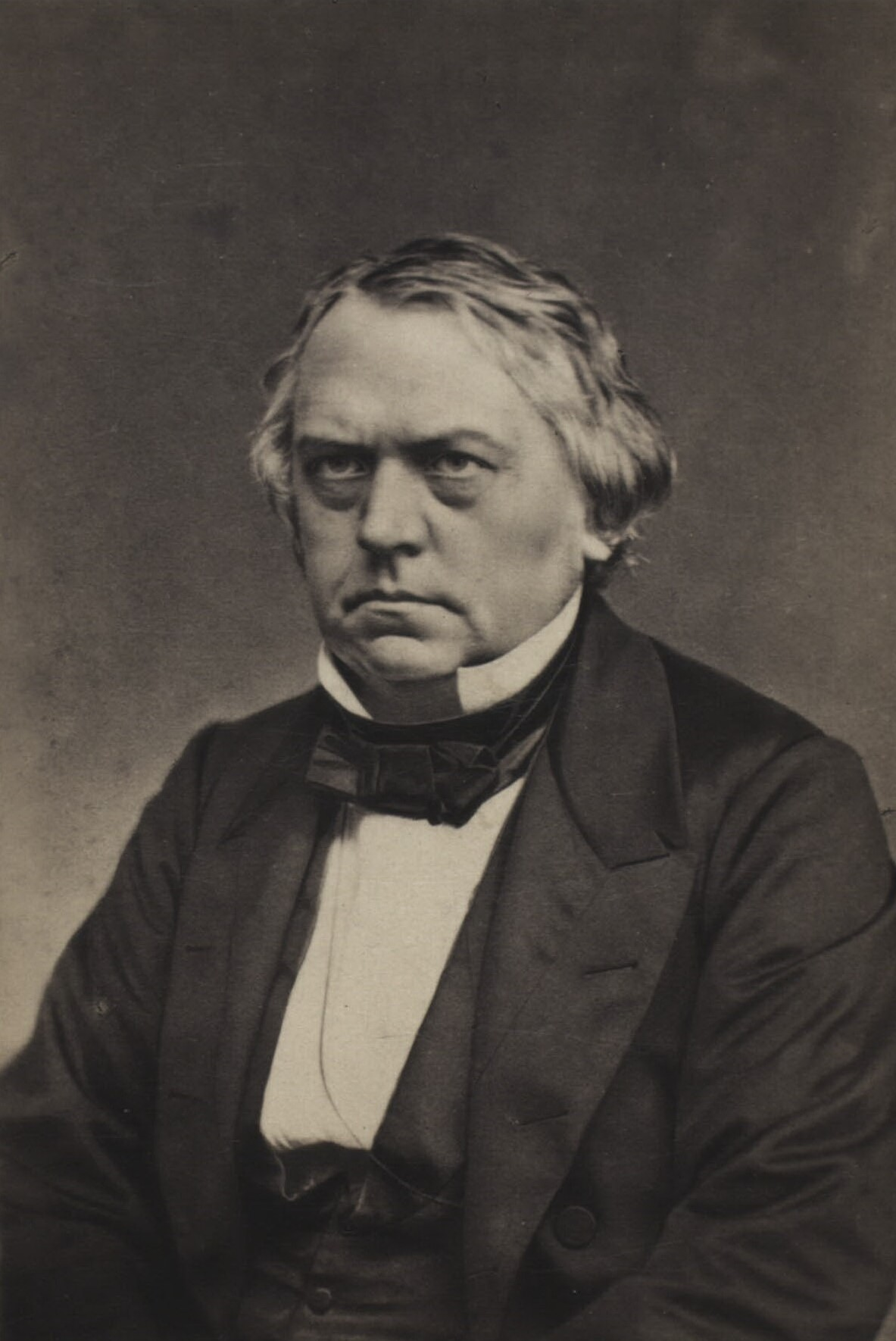

Council President of Denmark
- In office 31 December 1863 – 11 July 1864
- Monarch: Christian IX
- Preceded by: Carl Christian Hall
- Succeeded by: Christian Albrecht Bluhme

Personal details
- Born: 24 November 1811 Copenhagen, Denmark
- Died: 28 March 1887 (aged 75) Nykøbing Falster, Denmark
- Party: National Liberal Party

Ditlev Gothard Monrad (24 November 1811 – 28 March 1887) was a Danish politician and bishop, and a founding father of Danish constitutional democracy; he also led the country as Council President in its catastrophic defeat during the Second Schleswig War. Later, he became a New Zealand pioneer before returning to Denmark to become a bishop and politician once more.

Monrad's father, Otto Sommer Monrad, an attorney, suffered from mental illness, and spent some years in institutions. From time to time Monrad was himself on the brink of, or had, emotional breakdowns.

== Career ==
Monrad studied theology, learned Semitic and Persian languages, and became a Lutheran priest while beginning to participate in politics. He became a co-editor of the publication Fædrelandet in 1840, was a leading figure in the National Liberal Party and spearheaded the movement towards a constitutional Denmark. Monrad wrote the draft of the liberal 1849 Constitution of Denmark, with structure and many phrases similar to the current version. In it he coined the term people's church. The constitution was quite democratic for its time, largely a result of the political and philosophical positions formulated by Monrad.

Monrad became the first Minister of School and Church Affairs (Kultus) in 1848; he held the same position in 1859 as well as from 1860 to 1863. He was also Minister of the Interior 1860–1861, and a member of Parliament from 1849 to 1865 (except for three months between two elections in 1853). He was the bishop of the Lolland–Falster diocese from 1849 to 1854, and then a permanent secretary in the department of kultus from 1855 to 1859.

With war approaching, against the advice of the other National Liberal leaders, Monrad formed a government after the resignation of Hall, due to disagreement with Christian IX. As Council President (1863–1864), Monrad was the Danish state leader during the early part of the Second Schleswig War against the German Confederation led by Otto von Bismarck. With none of the other National Liberal leaders wanting to continue in office, Monrad became the most, and arguably often the only, important figure for cabinet decision-making. Yet, at critical moments during the war, Monrad was indecisive. Thus, during an armistice, he let the king decide on a peace proposal at the London Conference to divide Schleswig approximately along the language line between majorities of Danish and German speakers (see also the Schleswig-Holstein Question). The king, who held an unrealistic hope to maintain a personal union with the duchies, rejected, the conference ended with no result, and war resumed resulting in further military defeat. Next, the king dismissed Monrad and his government. The Peace of Vienna resulted in the loss of much of the monarchy's territory, including almost all of Schleswig. Denmark was relegated to a minor power. In what was labelled his speech of madness, Monrad spoke in Parliament for continued resistance and against ratifying the peace treaty even if such actions would look like 'madness'.

Following the war, a depressed and disillusioned Monrad emigrated to New Zealand. After sending his sons to Nelson and other districts of New Zealand to scout for land, he chose to settle in Palmerston North on the North Island of New Zealand. He bought 482 acres (1.95 km^{2}) of land at Karere Block. He first lived in a small hut and then erected a timber house and started clearing bushland. He and his family farmed cows and sheep.

Monrad helped the New Zealand Company to find suitable settlers from Scandinavia and helped many Danish immigrants find land to settle on, most notably in the area of Dannevirke. His work was disturbed by Māori who had been illegally robbed of their land, members of the Hauhau religion under Chief Tītokowaru. Monrad buried his belongings and went with the family to Wellington and then went back to Denmark in 1869. His sons Viggo and Johannes later returned to Karere to become farmers.

Before leaving New Zealand, he presented to New Zealand's Colonial Museum a collection of 600 woodcuts, etchings and engravings by European Old Masters, including Rembrandt, Hollar, Albrecht Dürer and van Dyck. They are now part of the collection at the Museum of New Zealand Te Papa Tongarewa where examples often feature in temporary exhibitions. Monrad Intermediate is a Palmerston North intermediate school named after Monrad.

After his return, Monrad again became bishop of the Lolland-Falster diocese from 1871 until his death. He also again began became a member of parliament from 1882 to 1886. Now, he publicly promoted the original and more liberal 1849 constitution against the conservative revision of 1866. His sharp mind and sense of the public mood was still feared by his opponents. He also defended himself against condemnations for the 1864 defeat while he acknowledged that in hindsight a better result could have been achieved at the London Conference.

Monrad published throughout most of his life on political and religious matters. His book from 1876 about prayer came in many reprints, is still cited and used in religious practice and was translated into five languages, including English. Monrad became one of the earliest and most outspoken Danish opponents of Darwin's new theories on evolution.

== Legacy ==
Monrad was respected for his intellect, idealism, and industriousness. His both theoretical and practical interest in political and ecclesiastical matters had a huge and lasting impact, primarily through the constitution but also a number of legal reforms which bear witness to an able politician and administrator. Yet, he showed himself to be an erratic political leader during the 1864 war ending in disastrous defeat. Ever since, Monrad's legacy has been split between these extremes. The historian Aage Friis characterized Monrad as 'one of the most outstanding but at the same time most enigmatic characters in modern Danish history, and the most difficult person to portray'.

There is a debate on whether Monrad's mental state affected his decision-making during the war, in particular dismissing the supreme commander and the break-up of the London Conference. The Danish television series 1864 portrays Monrad as a maniac nationalist. Other historians point out the high complexity of the situation; the absence in cabinet of other experienced ministers, including the other National Liberal leaders who had made the important decision leading up to the war and ignited the nationalistic public mood but now had left Monrad to himself; the opinion and dynastic position of the new king; the mixed messages of other European powers; as well as how formidable Bismarck showed himself to be as an opponent with a distinct cause for winning a war as a stepping stone towards German unification. A learned society for promoting knowledge about Monrad exists since 2012, founded by his successor as the bishop of Lolland-Falster.

== Literature ==
- Claus Bjørn and Carsten Due-Nielsen, Fra helstat til nationalstat 1814–1914. Dansk udenrigspolitisk historie. Second edition, Copenhagen, Gyldendal. 2006. ISBN 978-87-02-04975-6.
- D. G. Monrad, The World of Prayer; or, Prayer in relation to personal religion. Translated from the fourth German edition by J.S. Banks. Edinburgh 1879, 239 pages. T. & T. Clark [Danish original 1876]. OCLC 1183766 https://archive.org/stream/worldofprayerorp00monr#page/n1/mode/2up
- G.C. Petersen, D.G. Monrad : Scholar, statesman, priest and New Zealand pioneer and his New Zealand descendants, Kerslake, Billens & Humphrey. 1965. OCLC 471668679
- Johan Schioldann-Nielsen, The life of D.G. Monrad (1811-1887) : manic-depressive disorder and political leadership, Odense University Press, 1988. ISBN 87-7492-668-3.
- Kaare R. Skou, Land at lede, Copenhagen, Lindhardt og Ringhof. 2008. ISBN 978-87-11-31059-5.
- Svend Thorsen, De danske ministerier 1848–1901, Copenhagen, Pensionsforsikringsanstalten. 1967. ISBN 8774928945

Political offices
| Preceded by New office | Kultus Minister of Denmark; 22 March 1848 – 15 November 1848 | Succeeded by Johan Nicolai Madvig |
| Preceded by Carl Christian Hall | Kultus Minister of Denmark; 6 May 1859 – 2 December 1859 | Succeeded by Vilhem August Borgen |
| Preceded by Vilhelm August Borgen | Kultus Minister of Denmark; 24 February 1860 – 31 December 1863 | Succeeded by Christian Thorning Engelstoft |
| Preceded by Johan Christian von Jessen | Interior Minister of Denmark; 24 February 1860 – 15 September 1861 | Succeeded by Peter Martin Orla Lehmann |
| Preceded by Carl Christian Hall | Council President of Denmark; 31 December 1863 – 11 July 1864 | Succeeded by Christian Albrecht Bluhme |
| Preceded by Carl Emil Fenger | Finance Minister of Denmark; 31 December 1863 – 11 July 1864 | Succeeded by Christian Nathan David |
| Preceded by Carl Christian Hall | Foreign Minister of Denmark; 31 December 1863 – 8 January 1864 | Succeeded by George Quaade |
| Preceded by Carl Christian Hall | Minister for Holstein and Lauenburg; 31 December 1863 – 11 July 1864 | Succeeded by Christian Albrecht Bluhme |
