= Carl Emil Bardenfleth =

Danish autobiographer (1807–1857)

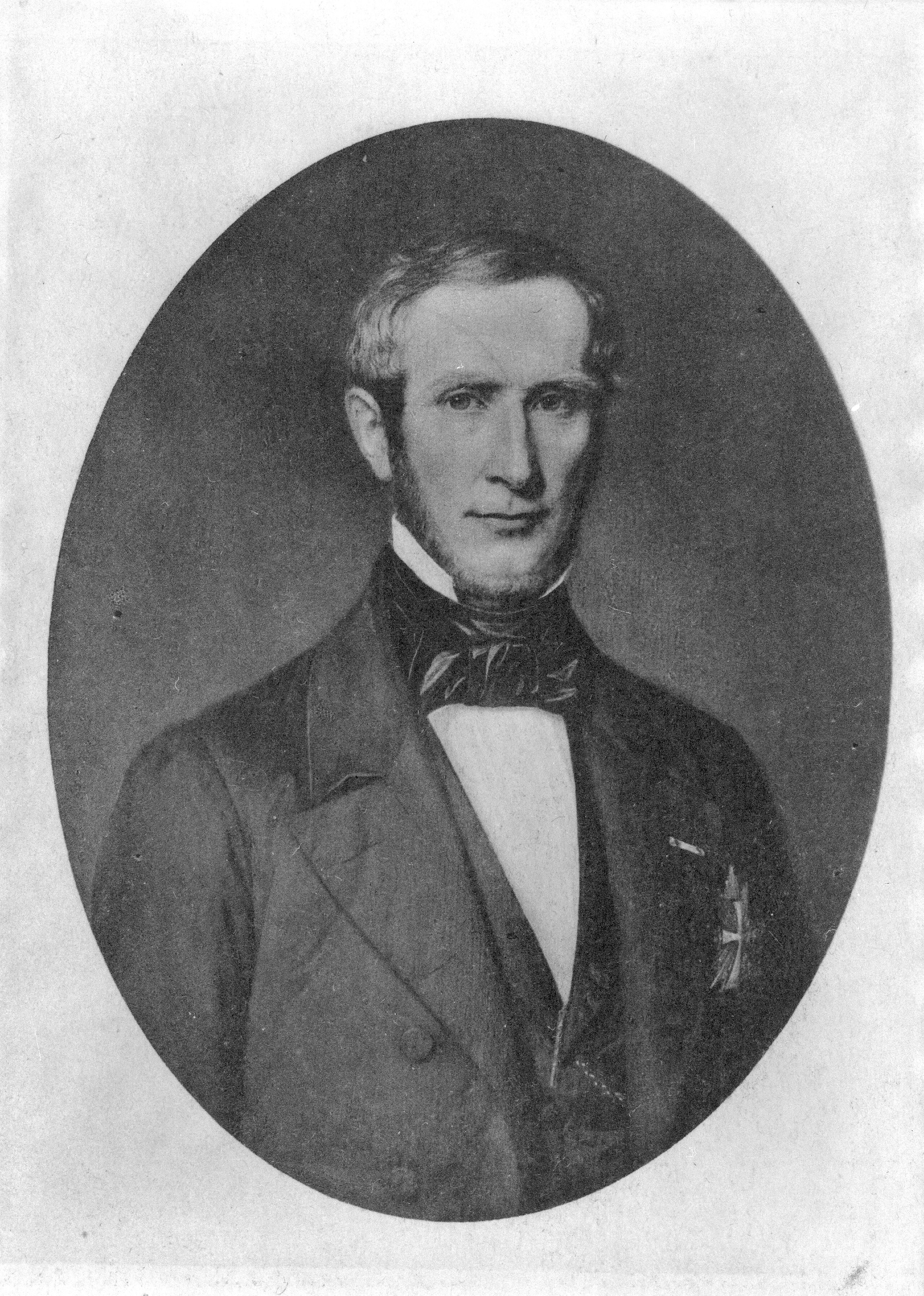
Carl Emil Bardenfleth

Carl Emil Bardenfleth (9 May 1807 – 3 September 1857) was a Danish civil servant and politician, who served as Governor of Iceland (1837–1841). He was a member of the Althing, and a Justice minister under Frederick VII (22 March 1848–13 July 1851).
