= Christian Emil Krag-Juel-Vind-Frijs =

Danish politician (1817–1896)

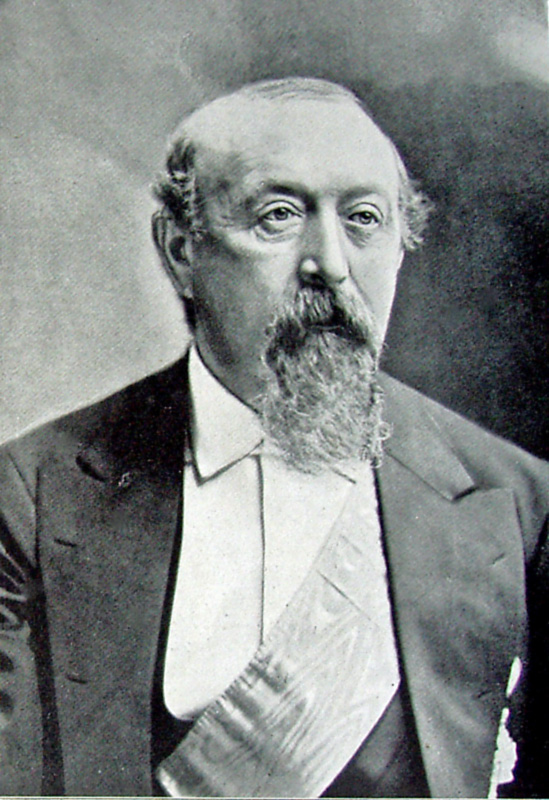
- Christian Emil; Krag-Juel-Vind-Frijs

Council President of Denmark
- In office 6 November 1865 – 28 May 1870
- Monarch: Christian IX
- Preceded by: Christian Albrecht Bluhme
- Succeeded by: Ludvig Holstein-Holsteinborg

Personal details
- Born: 8 December 1817 Frijsenborg, Denmark
- Died: 12 October 1896 (aged 78) Boller, East Jutland, Denmark
- Party: Højre

Christian Emil Krag-Juel-Vind-Frijs (8 December 1817 – 12 October 1896) was a Danish nobleman and politician. He was Council President of Denmark from 1865 to 1870 as the leader of the Frijs Cabinet.

== Biography ==
Frijs was born on 8 December 1817 at Frijsenborg, the son of count Jens Christian Carl Krag-Juel-Vind-Frijs (1779-1860) and Henriette Frederikke Magdalene Krag-Juel-Vind-Frijs (née zu Inn- und von Knyphausen). He graduated from Sorø Academy in 1835, thereby achieving his studentereksamen. He went on to study law, graduating cand.jur. in 1842.

Being the wealthiest large squire of Denmark and personally honoured by his peasants Frijs played a role in politics from the 1850s. During the internal debate about a new constitution after the 1864-war he was appointed prime minister in 1865 inaugurating the rule of the conservative party Højre that lasted until 1901 His cabinet was expected to widen the influence also of the farmers disappointed by the issuing of the conservative 1866-constitution but was besides marked by a beginning reclaiming of the moors and by railroad-founding. After his retreat in 1870 he led the negotiations with the French preventing a Danish participation in the Franco-Prussian War. He left politics 1880.

His son Count Mogens Krag-Juel-Vind-Frijs (1849–1923) was an outstanding liberal-conservative politician whose work anticipated the making of the modern conservative party.

== See also ==
- Frijsenborg

== Citations ==
- Svend Thorsen: De danske ministerier, vol. 1, Copenhagen, 1967.
- Danish Manorhouses website - Boller
- Danish Manorhouses website - Frijsenborg
- Lex.dk - Dansk Biografisk Leksikon - C.E. Frijs

Political offices
Preceded by Christian Albrecht Bluhme	Council President of Denmark; 6 November 1865 – 28 May 1870	Succeeded by Ludvig Holstein-Holsteinborg
Preceded by Christian Albrecht Bluhme	Foreign Minister of Denmark; 6 November 1865 – 28 May 1870	Succeeded by Otto Rosenørn-Lehn
