= Christian Albrecht Bluhme =

Danish lawyer and prime minister

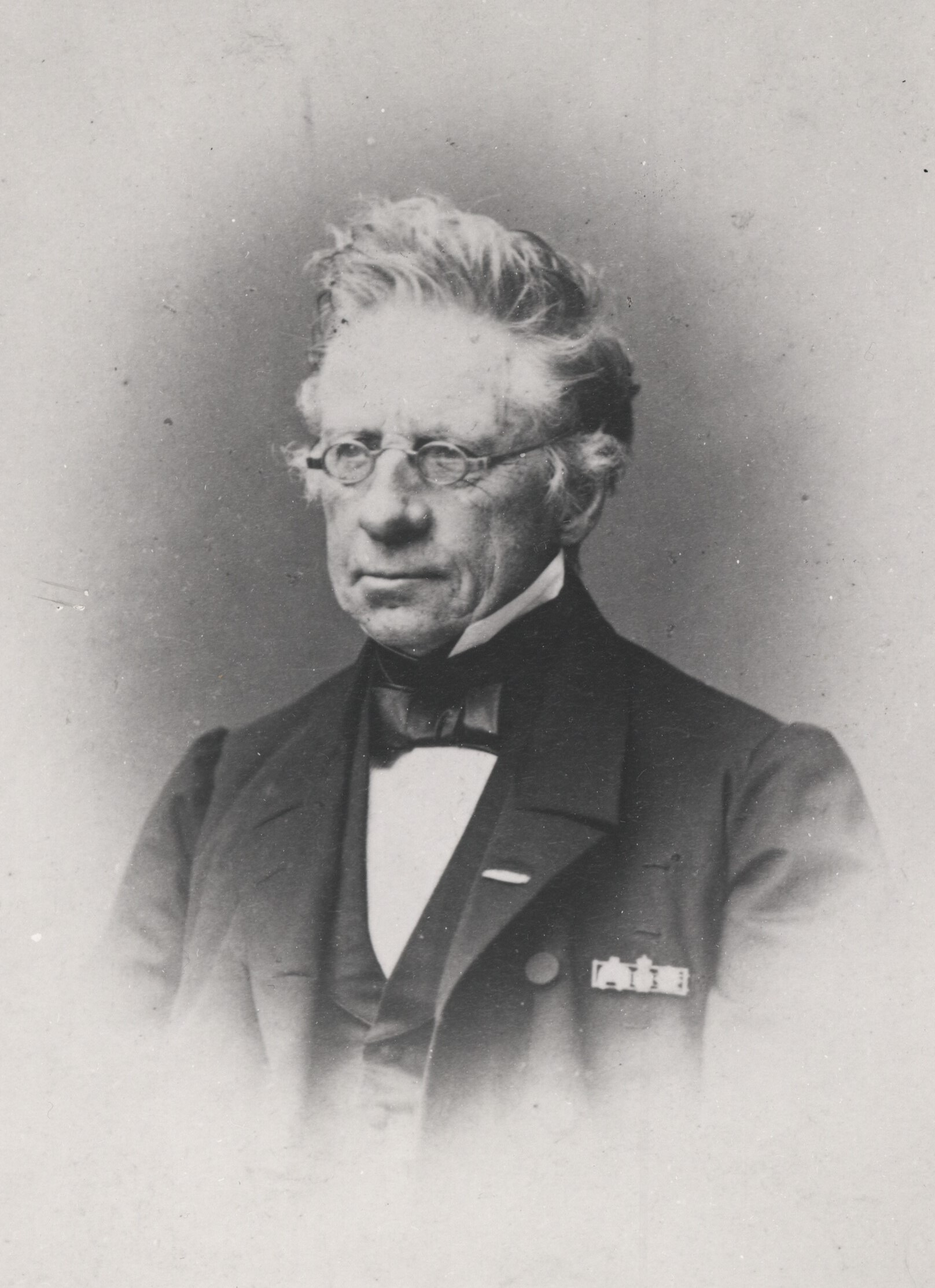
- Christian Albrecht Bluhme

2nd Prime Minister of Denmark
- In office 27 January 1852 – 21 April 1853
- Monarch: Frederick VII
- Preceded by: Adam Wilhelm Moltke
- Succeeded by: Anders Sandøe Ørsted

Council President of Denmark
- In office 11 July 1864 – 6 November 1865
- Monarch: Christian IX
- Preceded by: Ditlev Gothard Monrad
- Succeeded by: Christian Emil Krag-Juel-Vind-Frijs

Personal details
- Born: 27 December 1794; Copenhagen, Denmark
- Died: 16 December 1866 (aged 71); Copenhagen, Denmark
- Political party: Højre

Christian Albrecht Bluhme (27 December 1794 – 6 November 1866) was a Danish lawyer and conservative politician who was the second Prime Minister of Denmark (first time from 1852 to 1853 with title of Prime Minister, second time from 1864 to 1865 with title of council president). He led the country during the latter part of the Second Schleswig War.

== Biography ==
Bluhme was born in Copenhagen, Denmark as the son of a commander in the navy Hans Emilius Bluhme. Bluhme went to Herlufsholm School, where he became a legal candidate in 1816. In 1820 he became an auditor to the 2nd Jutland Regiment and two years after also the assessor in the Land Surveyor. In 1824, he went to the Governing Council in Trankebar. He returned to Denmark and was appointed in 1831 with the title of State Council to the town and county bailiff at Store Heddinge in Zealand. In 1838 he was appointed officer of the Diocese of Aalborg. He was called in 1843 to participate in the administration as Director of the General Chamber of Commerce and the College of Commerce, whose president he became in January 1848.

== Personal life ==
In 1832, he married Rasmine Wandel (1813–1865), daughter of regimental surgeon in Copenhagen C.F. Wandel. He was the father of naval officer Hans Emil Bluhme (1833–1926).

Political offices
Preceded by —	Trade Minister of Denmark; 22 March 1848 – 15 November 1848	Succeeded by —
Preceded by Holger Christian Reedtz	Foreign Minister of Denmark; 18 October 1851 – 12 December 1854	Succeeded by Wulff Scheel-Plessen
Preceded by Adam Wilhelm Moltke	Prime Minister of Denmark; 27 January 1852 – 21 April 1853	Succeeded by Anders Sandøe Ørsted
Preceded by Ditlev Gothard Monrad	Council President of Denmark; 11 July 1864 – 6 November 1865	Succeeded by Christian Emil Krag-Juel-Vind-Frijs
