= Adam Wilhelm Moltke =

Danish nobleman and politician

His Grace Adam Wilhelm Moltke R.E..
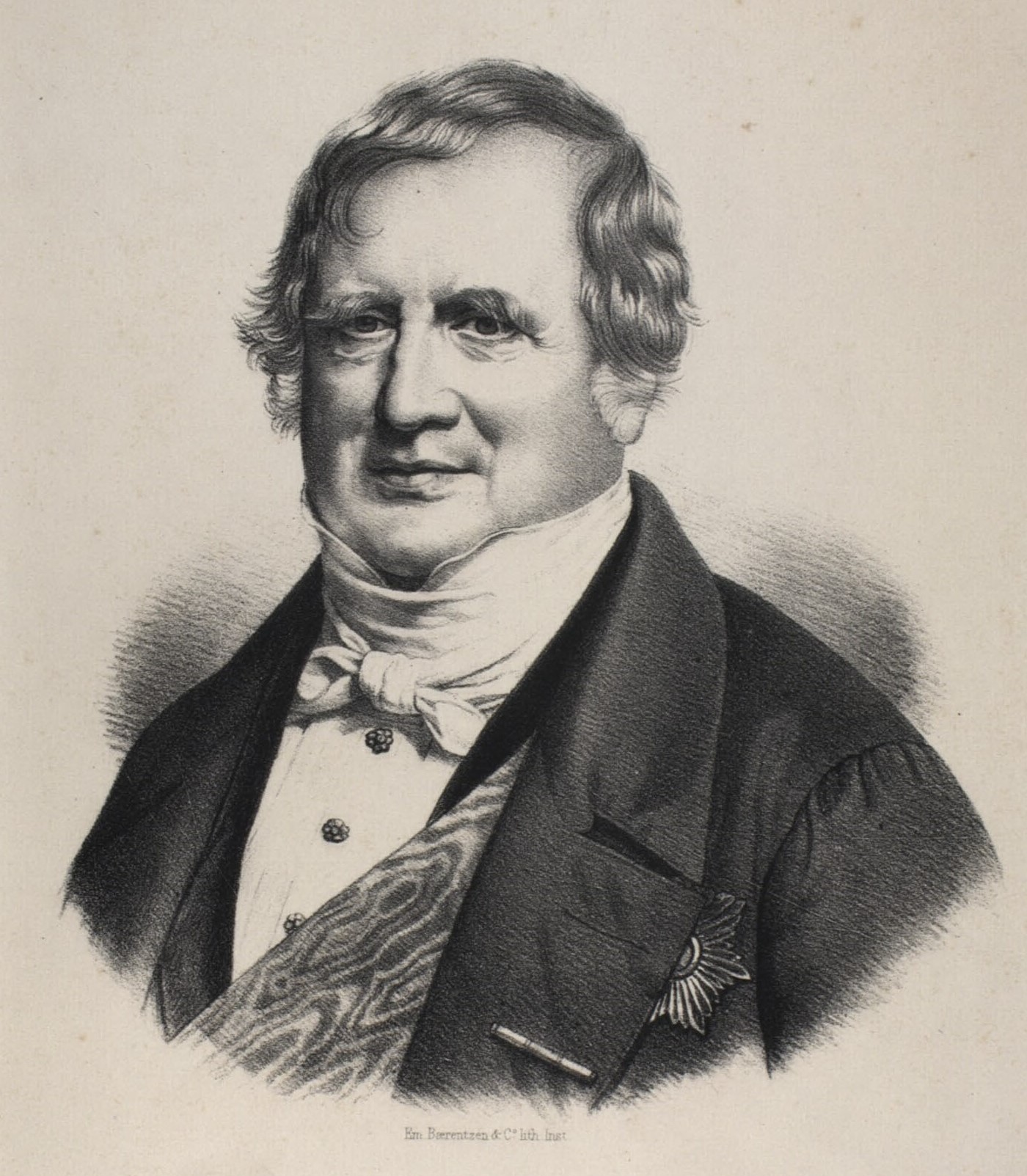
- Early 1830s painting of Adam Wilhelm Moltke

1st Prime Minister of Denmark
- In office 22 March 1848 – 27 January 1852
- Monarch: Frederick VII
- Preceded by: Position established
- Succeeded by: Christian Albrecht Bluhme

2nd Minister of Foreign Affairs of Denmark
- In office 16 November 1848 – 6 August 1850
- Preceded by: Frederik Marcus Knuth, Count of Knuthenborg
- Succeeded by: Holger Christian Reedtz

Personal details
- Born: 25 August 1785 Einsidelsborg, Denmark
- Died: 15 February 1864 (aged 78) Copenhagen, Denmark
- Resting place: Karice Church, Karise, Denmark
- Spouse(s): Frederikke Louise Knuth; Marie Elisabeth Knuth
- Children: Frederik Moltke; Christian Moltke
- Parent(s): Joachim Godske Moltke; Georgine von Buchwald
- Relatives: Adam Gottlob Moltke (grandfather)

Adam Wilhelm Moltke, 3rd Count of Bregentved (25 August 1785 – 15 February 1864) was a Danish nobleman, landowner, civil servant and politician, who in 1848–1852 was the first Prime Minister of Denmark under the new constitutional monarchy outlined in 1848 and signed as the Danish Constitution on 5 June 1849 by Frederick VII of Denmark.

== Early life and education ==
A member of the Danish and German noble family Moltke, Adam Wilhelm Moltke was born on 25 August 1785 at the Einsiedelsborg manor house on the island of Funen, the son of Privy Counsellor Joachim Godske Moltke. His paternal grandfather was Adam Gottlob Moltke, the influential Lord Steward and royal favourite of King Frederick V of Denmark and Norway.

As a child, Moltke was tutored by Jacob Peter Mynster, who later became the bishop of Zealand.

== Career ==
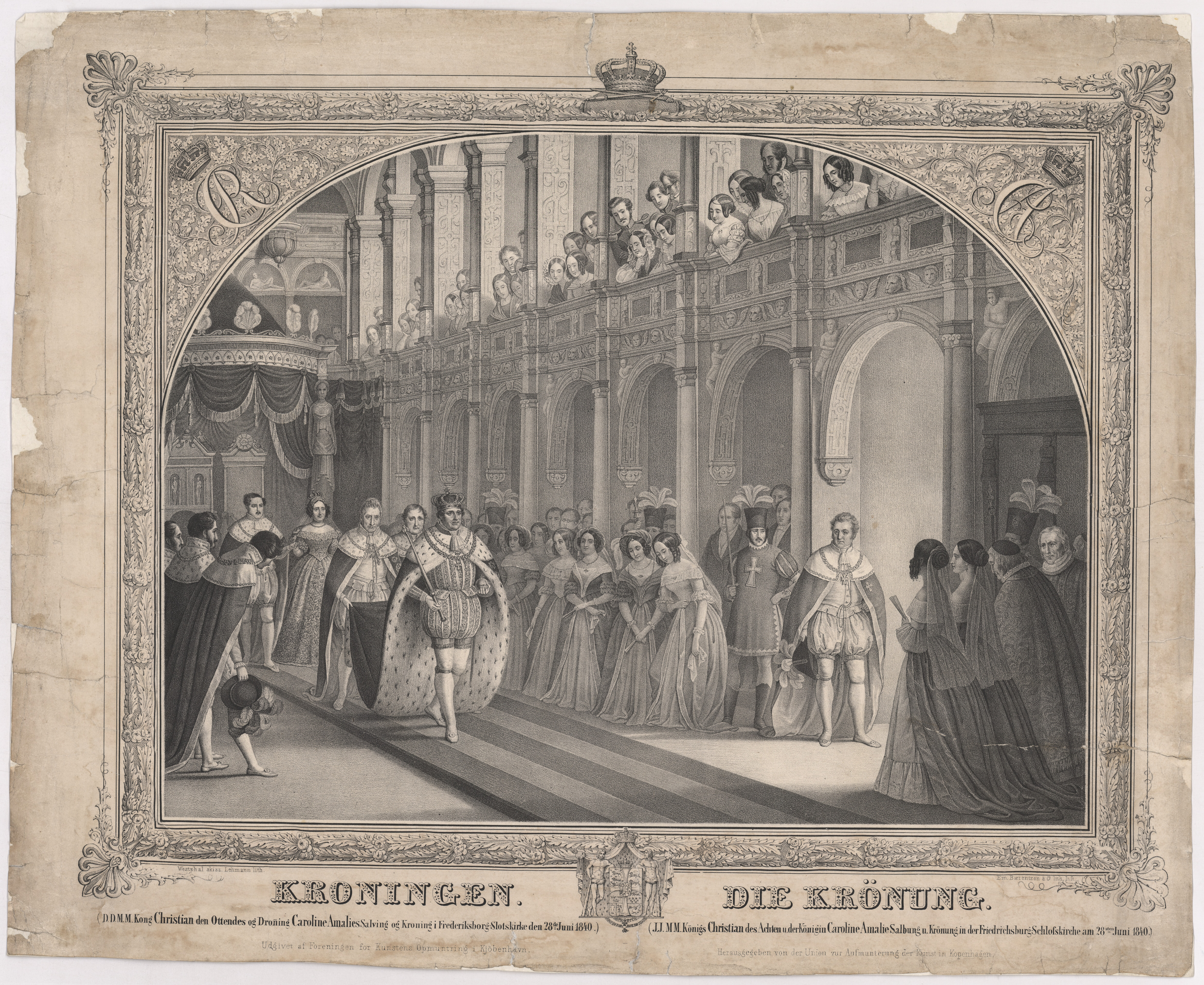
Moltke attending the coronation of Christian VIII in 1840.

He was known as a humane and patriarchal squire but was no outstanding political figure. From 1845, he was Minister of Financial Affairs. At the fall of the last absolute government, he too was dismissed but, a few days later, he was persuaded to form the new national government as the most suitable leader both as for his social position and as for his moderate views.

=== Prime minister of Denmark ===
The cabinet created on 22 March 1848 was called the March Cabinet. On 16 November 1848 it was replaced by the November Cabinet, which in turn was replaced by the July Cabinet on 13 July 1851, which again was replaced by the October Cabinet on 18 October 1851. The cabinet, originally a Conservative-Liberal one, gradually became more and more openly conservative both because of the general liberal withdrawal and because of foreign pressure.

On 27 January 1852, Christian Albrecht Bluhme replaced Moltke as Prime Minister.

== Personal life ==
Moltke succeeded his father as Count of Bregentved in 1818. He was also the owner of Merløsegaard north of Ringsted and Sofiedal.

Molke was married twice. His first wife, Frederikke Louise Knuth (1797–1819), died in 1819. After Frederikke's death, he married Marie Elisabeth Knuth (1791–1851), her sister. Marie Elisabeth and Adam had two children:

- Frederik Georg Julius Moltke (1825–1875)
- Christian Moltke (1833–1918), who married Caroline Amalie of Danneskiold-Samsøe (1843–1876) in 1865.

Adam Wilhelm Moltke died on 15 February 1864 in Copenhagen and is buried in the Moltke burial chapel in Karise Church in Faxe Municipality. Cape Moltke in Greenland was named after him in 1829 by Lieutenant Wilhelm August Graah (1793–1863).

== See also ==
- Bregentved

Political offices
Preceded by New office	Prime Minister of Denmark; 22 March 1848 – 27 January 1852	Succeeded by Christian Albrecht Bluhme
Preceded by New office ?	Finance Minister of Denmark; 22 March 1848 – 16 November 1848	Succeeded by Wilhelm Sponneck
Preceded by New office ?	Navy Minister of Denmark; 22 March 1848 – 6 April 1848	Succeeded by Christian Christopher Zahrtmann
Preceded by Frederik Marcus Knuth	Foreign Minister of Denmark; 16 November 1848 – 6 August 1850	Succeeded by Holger Christian Reedtz
