= Wolfgang von Haffner =

Danish military officer and politician

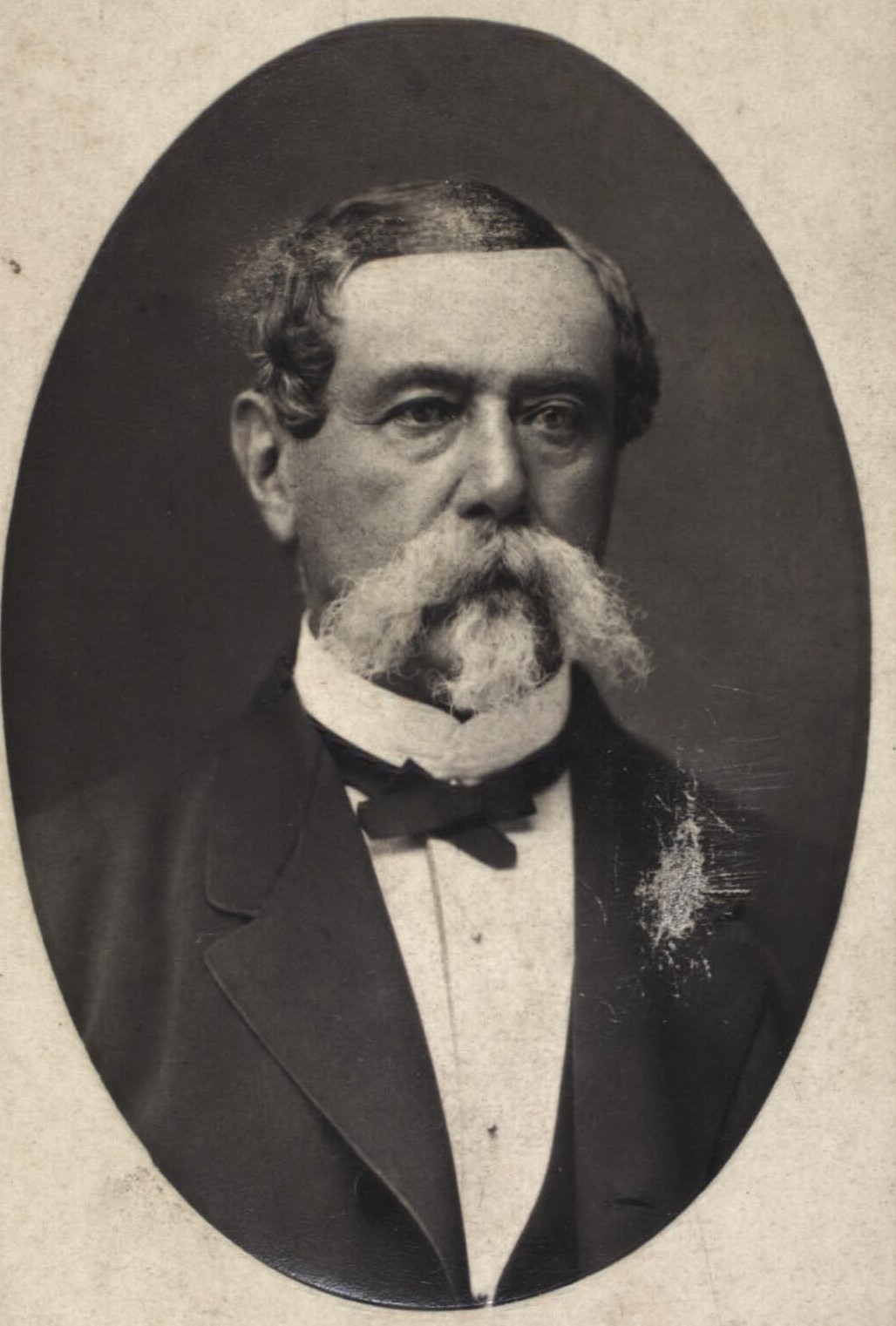
Wolfgang Haffner

Wolfgang von Haffner (10 September 1810 – 28 April 1887) was a Danish military officer and politician.

He was born in Valby as a son of Johan Wolfgang Reinhold Haffner and a nephew of Adam Mogens Wenzel Haffner. In November 1832, he married Sophie Wilhelmine Caroline Krieger (1807–1889). He had a military career in his early life, being second lieutenant at the age of 15. He became chamberlain in 1847 and general à la suite in 1871.

He was a member of the Danish Landsting from 1866 to his death. He became the Interior Ministers of Denmark in the Cabinet of Frijs on 22 September 1869, and held this position until 28 May 1870 when the cabinet fell. He immediately joined the new Cabinet of Holstein-Holsteinborg, as both War Minister and Navy Minister. He left in 1872 due to disagreements with the Finance Minister, Andreas Frederik Krieger. On 11 June 1875, when the Estrup Cabinet assumed office, Haffner returned to both his posts. He left on 28 July 1877.

He was decorated with the Grand Cross of the Order of the Dannebrog in 1877, and was ranked as Class 1 in the Danish order of precedence from 1880. He died in April 1887 in Copenhagen.

Political offices
Preceded by Jacob Brønnum Scavenius Estrup	Interior Minister of Denmark; 1869–1870	Succeeded by Christen Andreas Fonnesbech
Preceded by vacant	War Minister of Denmark; Navy Minister of Denmark; 1870–1872	Succeeded by Christian Albert Frederik Thomsen
Preceded by vacant	War Minister of Denmark; Navy Minister of Denmark; 1874–1877	Succeeded by Johan Christopher Frederik Dreyer
