= Sehested Cabinet =

Former Danish Council president

Sehested
- 20th Cabinet of Denmark

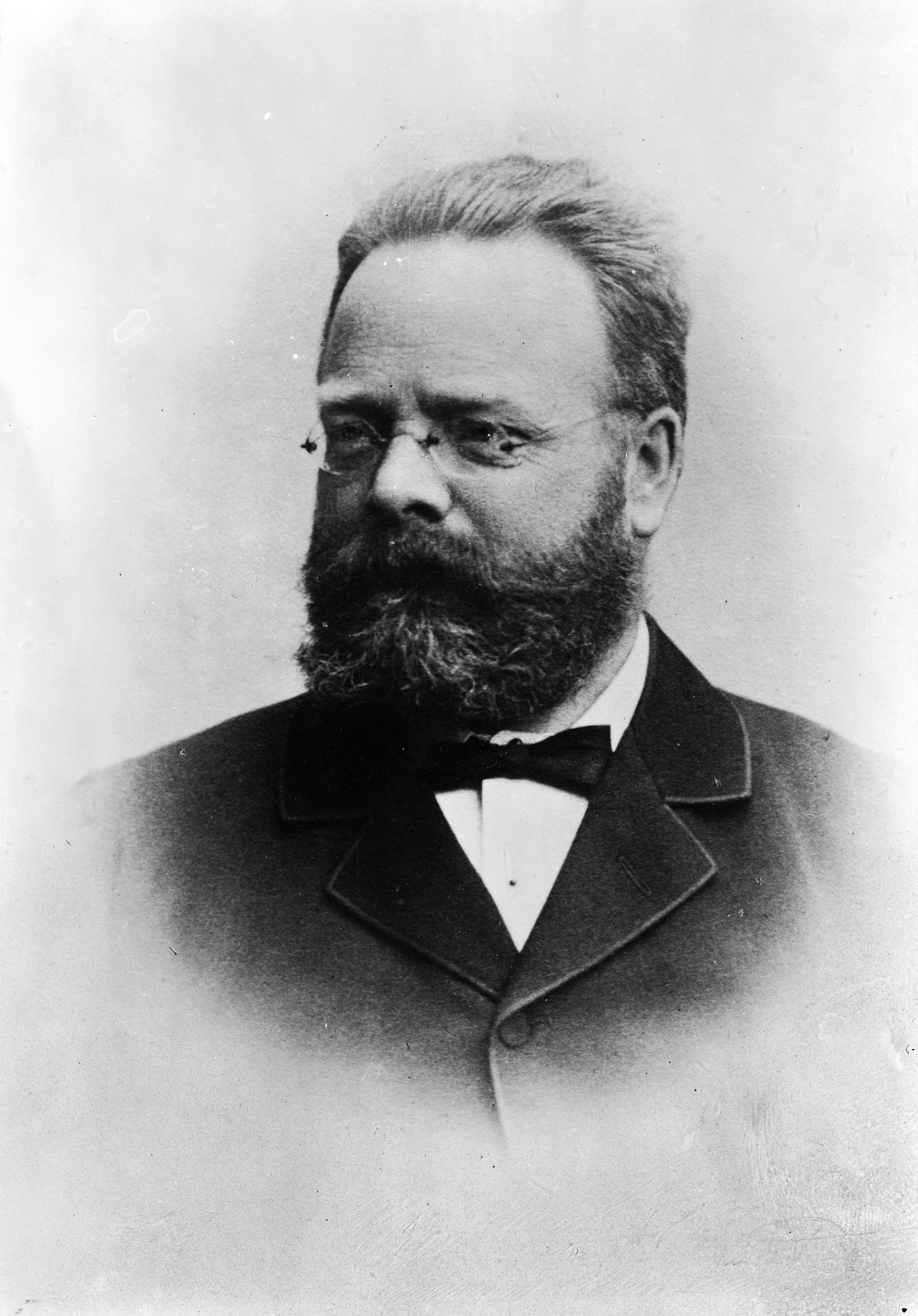
- Date formed: 27 April 1900
- Date dissolved: 24 July 1901

People and organisations
- Head of state: Christian IX
- Head of government: Hannibal Sehested
- No. of ministers: 9
- Total no. of members: 9
- Member party: Højre

History
- Outgoing election: 1901
- Predecessor: Hørring
- Successor: Deuntzer

After Hugo Egmont Hørring's resignation as Council President, Hannibal Sehested of the conservative party Højre became the leader of the new cabinet, which replaced the Cabinet of Hørring. It consisted entirely of members of the party Højre, was formed on 27 April 1900 and was called the Cabinet of Sehested.

The cabinet was replaced by the Cabinet of Deuntzer on 24 July 1901.

== List of ministers and portfolios ==
Some of the terms in the table begin before 27 April 1900 because the minister was in the Cabinet of Hørring as well.

Cabinet members
Portfolio	Minister	Took office	Left office	Party
Council President & Minister of Foreign Affairs	Hannibal Sehested	27 April 1900	24 July 1901	Højre
Minister for Finance	H. William Scharling	27 April 1900	24 July 1901	Højre
Minister of the Interior	Ludvig Ernst Bramsen	28 August 1899	24 July 1901	Højre
Minister of Justice & Minister for Iceland	A.H.F.C. Goos	27 April 1900	24 July 1901	Højre
Kultus Minister	J.J.K. Bjerre	27 April 1900	24 July 1901	Højre
Minister of War	J.G.F. Schnack	28 August 1899	24 July 1901	Højre
Minister of the Navy	Christian Giørtz Middelboe	27 April 1900	24 July 1901	Højre
Minister of Public Works	Christian Juul-Rysensteen	27 April 1900	24 July 1901	Højre
Minister for Agriculture	Frederik Friis	27 April 1900	24 July 1901	Højre

Preceded by Cabinet of Hørring	Cabinet of Denmark; 1900 – 1901	Succeeded by Cabinet of Deuntzer
