= 1899 in Iceland =

- Decades: 1870s; 1880s; 1890s; 1900s; 1910s
- See also: Other events of 1899; Timeline of Icelandic history

Events in the year 1899 in Iceland.

== Incumbents ==
- Monarch: Christian IX
- Minister for Iceland: Nicolai Reimer Rump (until 28 August); Hugo Egmont Hørring onwards

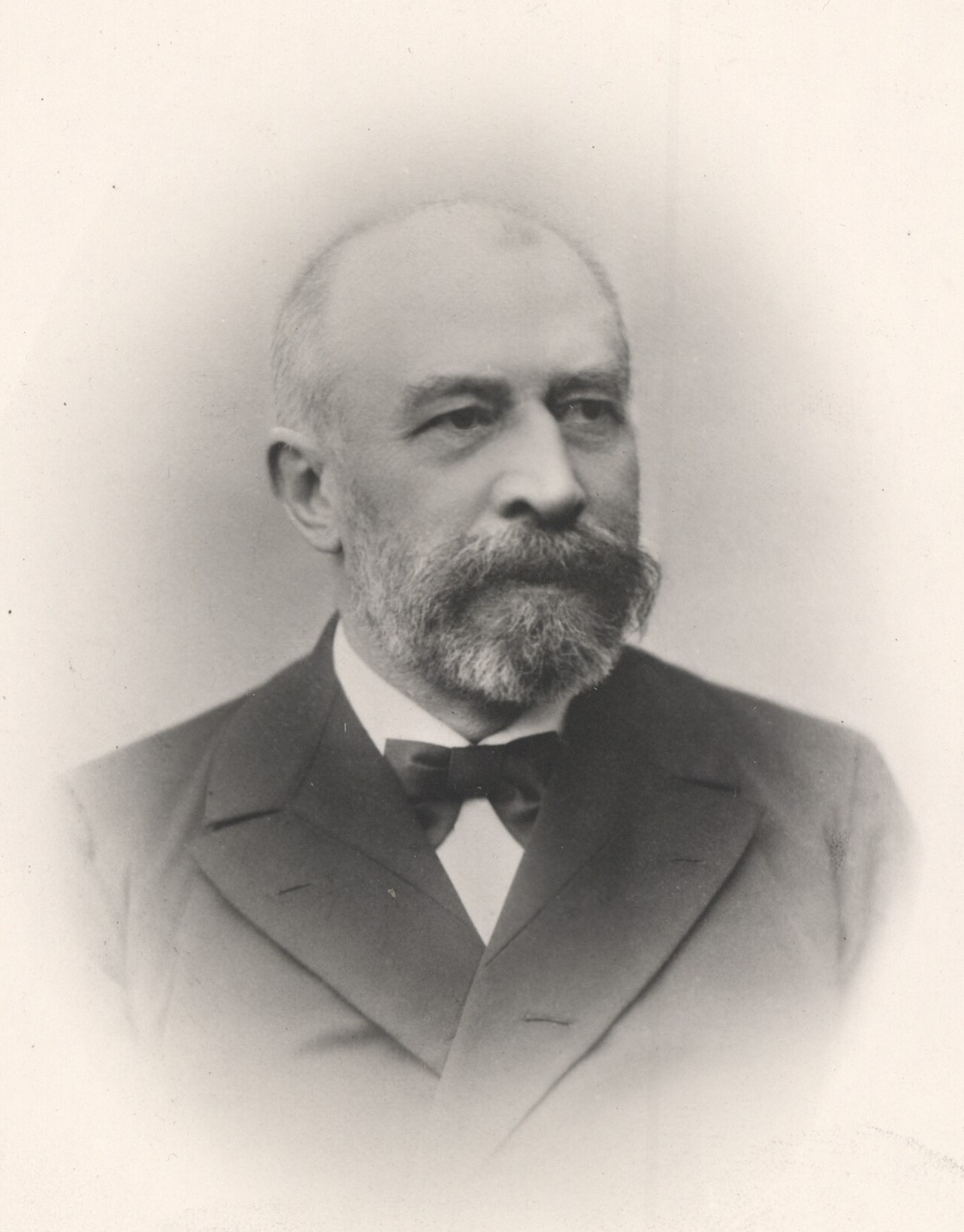
Hugo Egmont Hørring

== Events ==
- 16 February – Knattspyrnufélag Reykjavíkur is established in Reykjavík.
- 28 August – Hugo Egmont Hørring is appointed Minister for Iceland.
