= 1896 in Iceland =

- Decades: 1870s; 1880s; 1890s; 1900s; 1910s
- See also: Other events of 1896; Timeline of Icelandic history

Events in the year 1896 in Iceland.

== Incumbents ==
- Monarch: Christian IX
- Minister for Iceland: Johannes Nellemann (until 13 June); Nicolai Reimer Rump onwards

== Events ==
- Dagskrá – Reykjavík, Icelands first newspaper begins publication.
