= 1900 in Iceland =

- Decades: 1880s; 1890s; 1900s; 1910s; 1920s
- See also: Other events in 1900 · Timeline of Icelandic history

Events in the year 1900 in Iceland.

== Incumbents ==
- Monarch: Christian IX
- Minister for Iceland: Hugo Egmont Hørring (until 27 April); August Hermann Ferdinand Carl Goos onwards

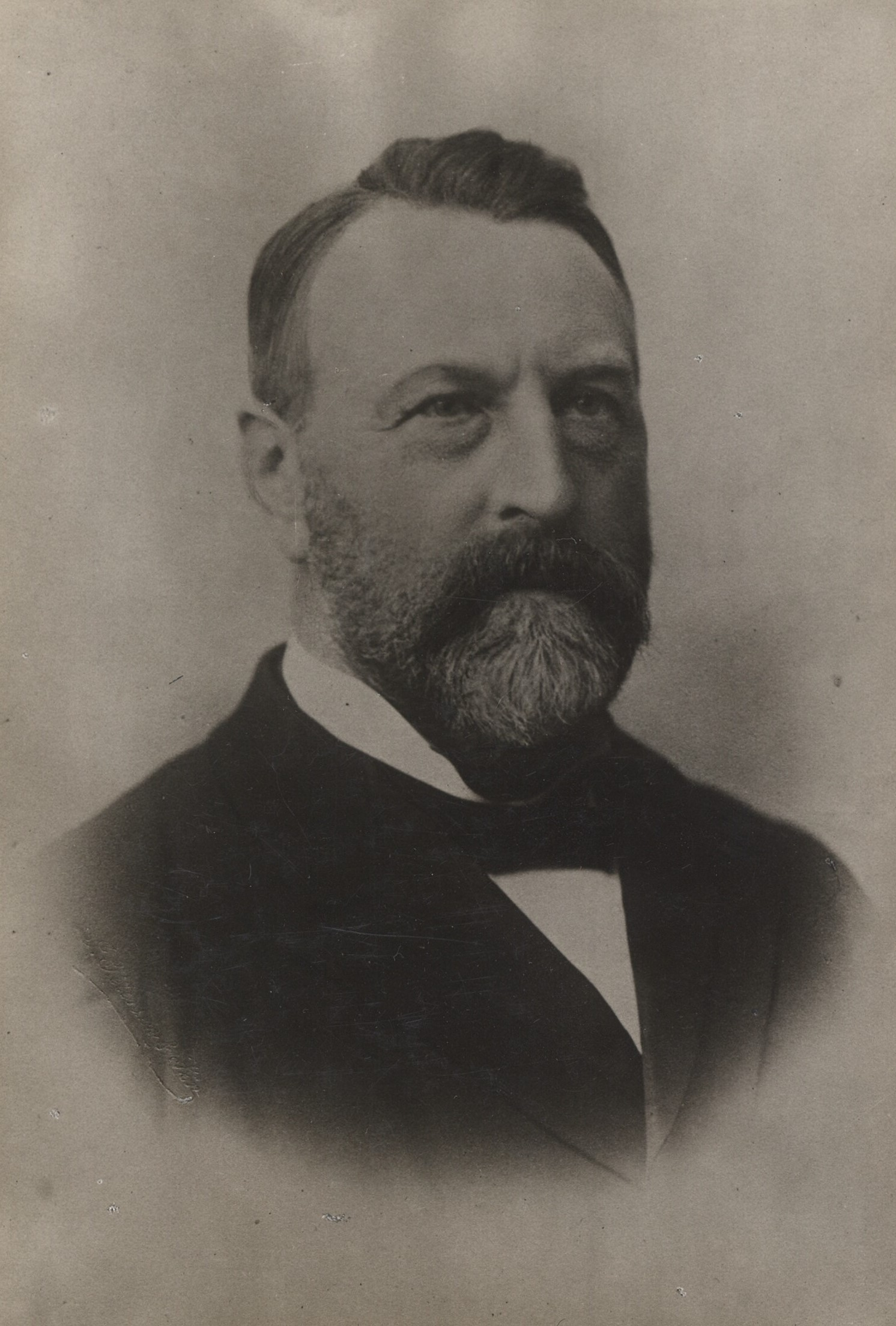
August Hermann Ferdinand Carl Goos

== Events ==
- 27 April – August Hermann Ferdinand Carl Goos is appointed Minister for Iceland.
- 29 June – The Home Rule Party is established.
