= 1901 in Iceland =

- Decades: 1880s; 1890s; 1900s; 1910s; 1920s
- See also: Other events in 1901 · Timeline of Icelandic history

Events in the year 1901 in Iceland.

== Incumbents ==
- Monarch: Christian IX
- Minister for Iceland: August Hermann Ferdinand Carl Goos (until 24 July); Peter Adler Alberti onwards

== Events ==
- 24 July – Peter Adler Alberti is appointed Minister for Iceland.
- Powers of Darkness is published.

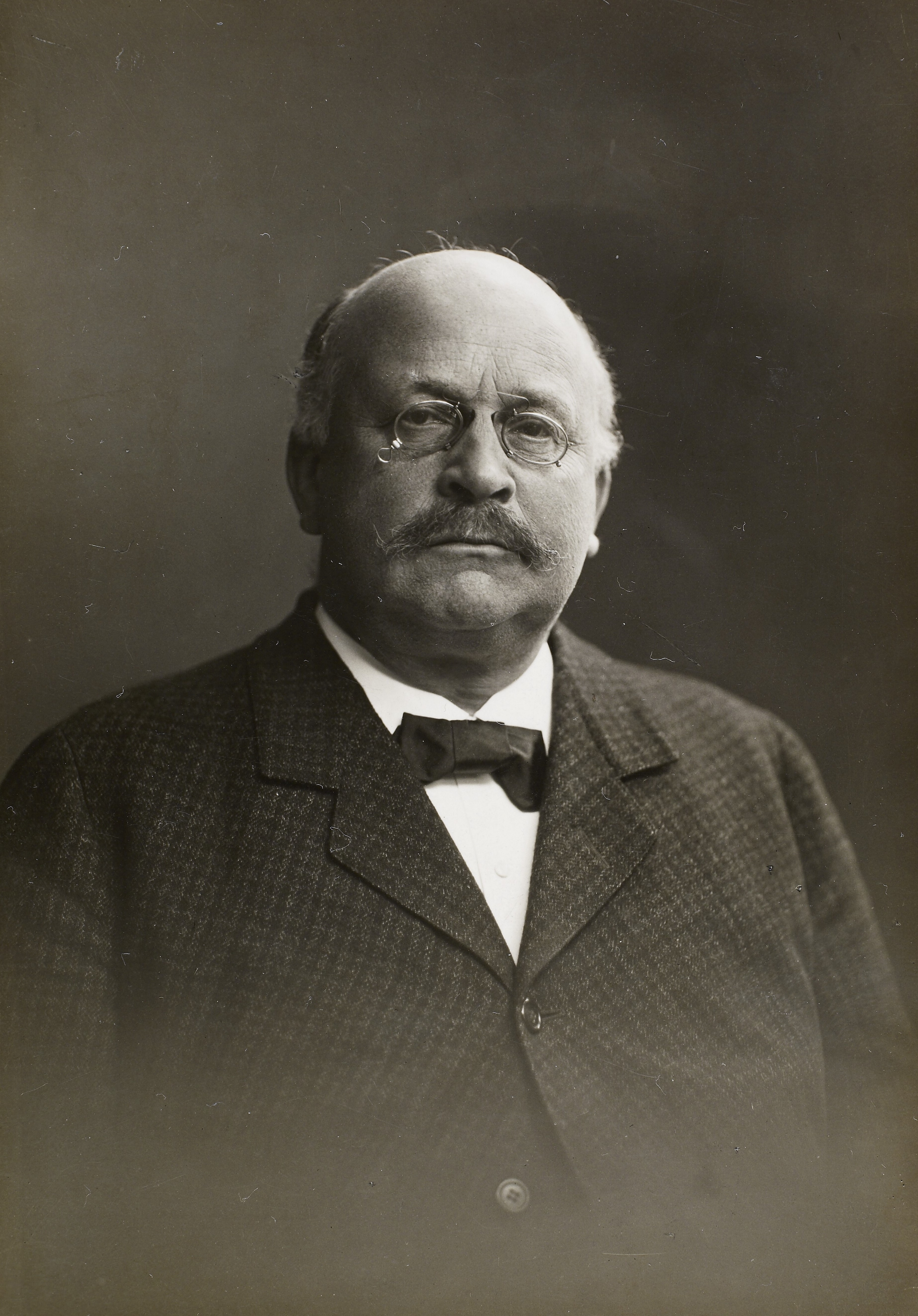
Peter Adler Alberti
