= Reedtz-Thott cabinet =

Government of Denmark, 1894–1897

Reedtz-Thott's cabinet
- 18th Cabinet of Denmark

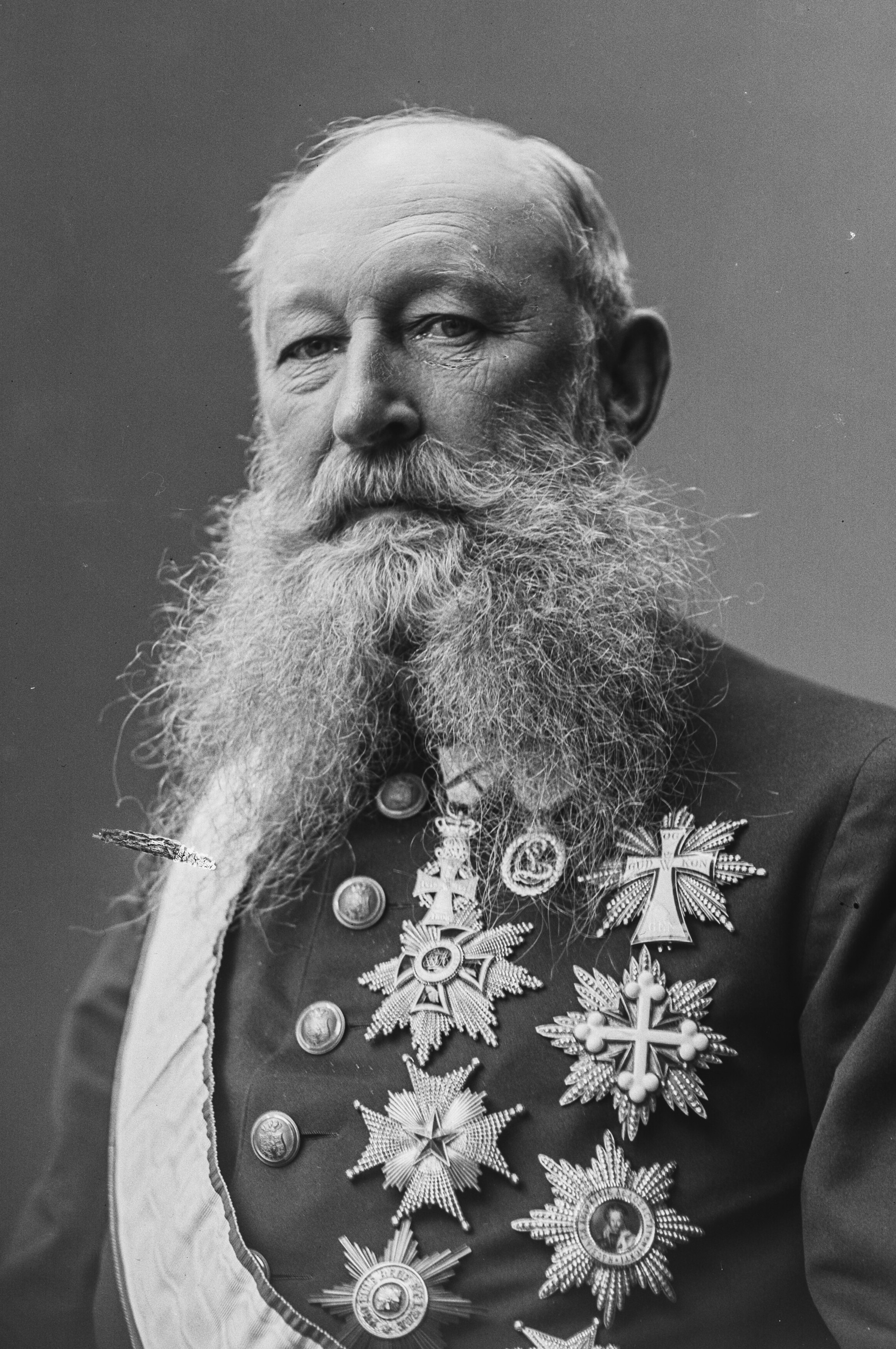
- Date formed: 7 August 1894
- Date dissolved: 23 May 1897

People and organisations
- Head of state: Christian IX of Denmark
- Head of government: Tage Reedtz-Thott

History
- Election: 1895 Danish Folketing election
- Outgoing election: 1898 Danish Folketing election
- Predecessor: Estrup
- Successor: Hørring

The Reedtz-Thott cabinet was the government of Denmark from 7 August 1894 to 23 May 1897. It replaced the Estrup cabinet and was succeeded by the Hørring cabinet on 23 May 1897.

== List of ministers and portfolios ==
Some of the terms in the table begin before 7 August 1894 or end after 23 May 1897 because the minister was in the Estrup cabinet or the Hørring cabinet as well.

Cabinet members
Portfolio	Minister	Took office	Left office	Party
Council President & Minister of Foreign Affairs	Tage Reedtz-Thott	7 August 1894	23 May 1897	Højre
Minister for Finance	Christian Lüttichau	7 August 1894	23 May 1897	Højre
Minister of the Interior	Hugo Egmont Hørring	15 January 1894	23 May 1897	Højre
Minister of Justice & Minister for Iceland	Johannes Nellemann	11 June 1875	13 June 1896	Højre
Minister of Justice & Minister for Iceland	Nicolai Reimer Rump	13 June 1896	23 May 1897	Højre
Kultus Minister	Vilhelm Bardenfleth	7 August 1894	23 May 1897	Højre
Minister of War	C.A.F. Thomsen	7 August 1894	25 April 1896	Højre
Minister of War	Johan Christopher Frederik Dreyer	25 April 1896	23 May 1897	Højre
Minister of the Navy	Niels Frederik Ravn	4 January 1879	27 April 1900	Højre
Minister of Public Works	Hans Peter Ingerslev	15 January 1894	20 April 1896	Højre
Minister of Public Works	Hugo Egmont Hørring	20 April 1896	22 May 1896	Højre
Minister for Agriculture	Knud Sehested	22 May 1896	23 May 1897	Højre

Preceded by Estrup	Cabinet of Denmark; 7 August 1894 – 23 May 1897	Succeeded by Hørring
