= 1893 in Iceland =

- Decades: 1870s; 1880s; 1890s; 1900s; 1910s
- See also: Other events of 1893; Timeline of Icelandic history

Events in the year 1893 in Iceland.

== Incumbents ==
- Monarch: Christian IX
- Minister for Iceland: Johannes Nellemann

== Events ==
- Alexander Keith Johnston publishes a map of the Island of Iceland.

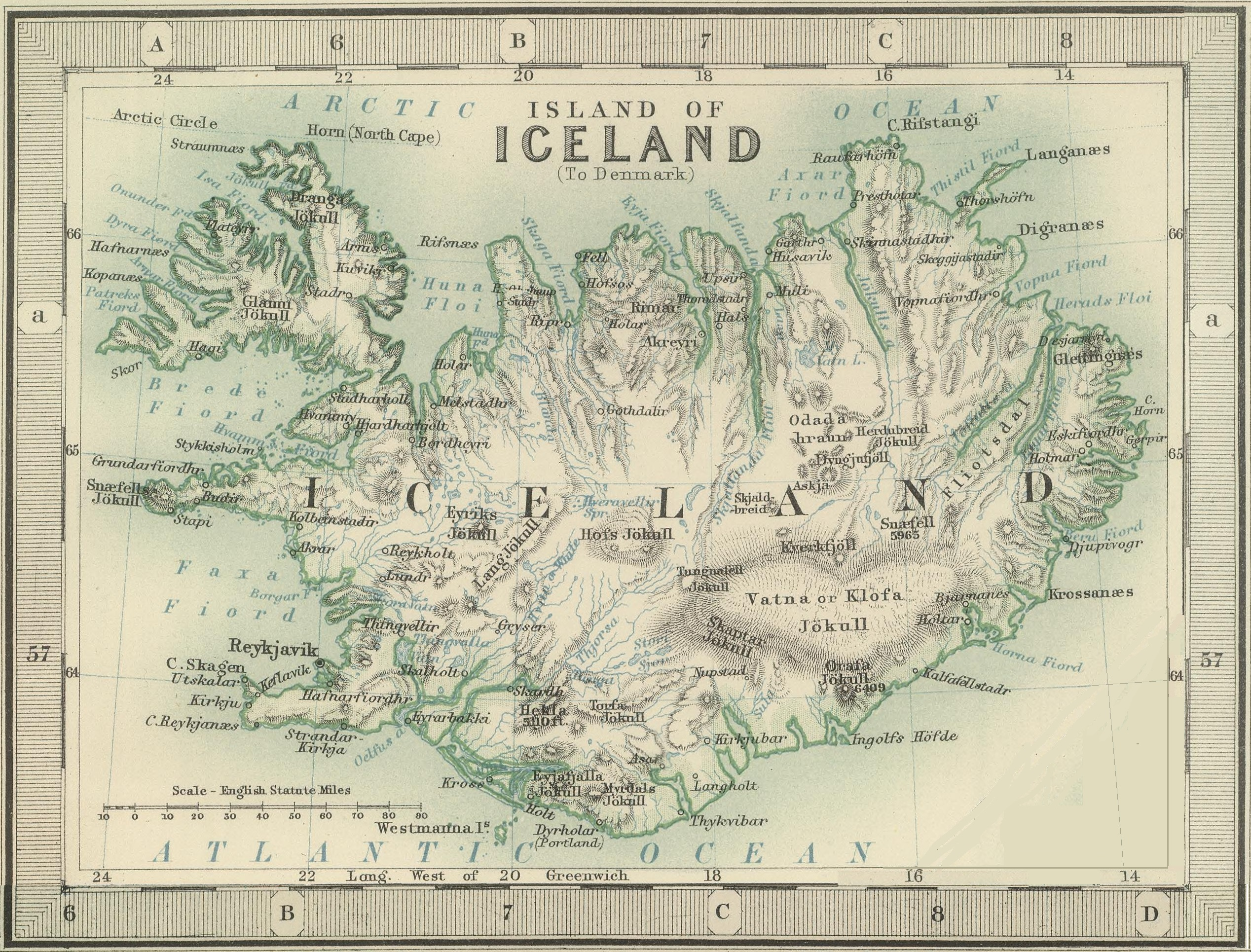
Alexander Keith Johnston's map, published in 1893

== Births ==
- 12 February – Steingrímur Steinþórsson, prime minister
- 20 May – Ásmundur Sveinsson, sculptor
- 12 October – Páll Ísólfsson, composer
