= 1889 in Iceland =

- Decades: 1860s; 1870s; 1880s; 1890s; 1900s
- See also: Other events of 1889; Timeline of Icelandic history

Events in the year 1889 in Iceland.

== Incumbents ==
- Monarch: Christian IX
- Minister for Iceland: Johannes Nellemann

== Events ==
- Víðidalstungukirkja is constructed in Húnaþing vestra.
- Hallgrímur Sveinsson became the fifth Bishop of Iceland, succeeding Pétur Pétursson in the position.

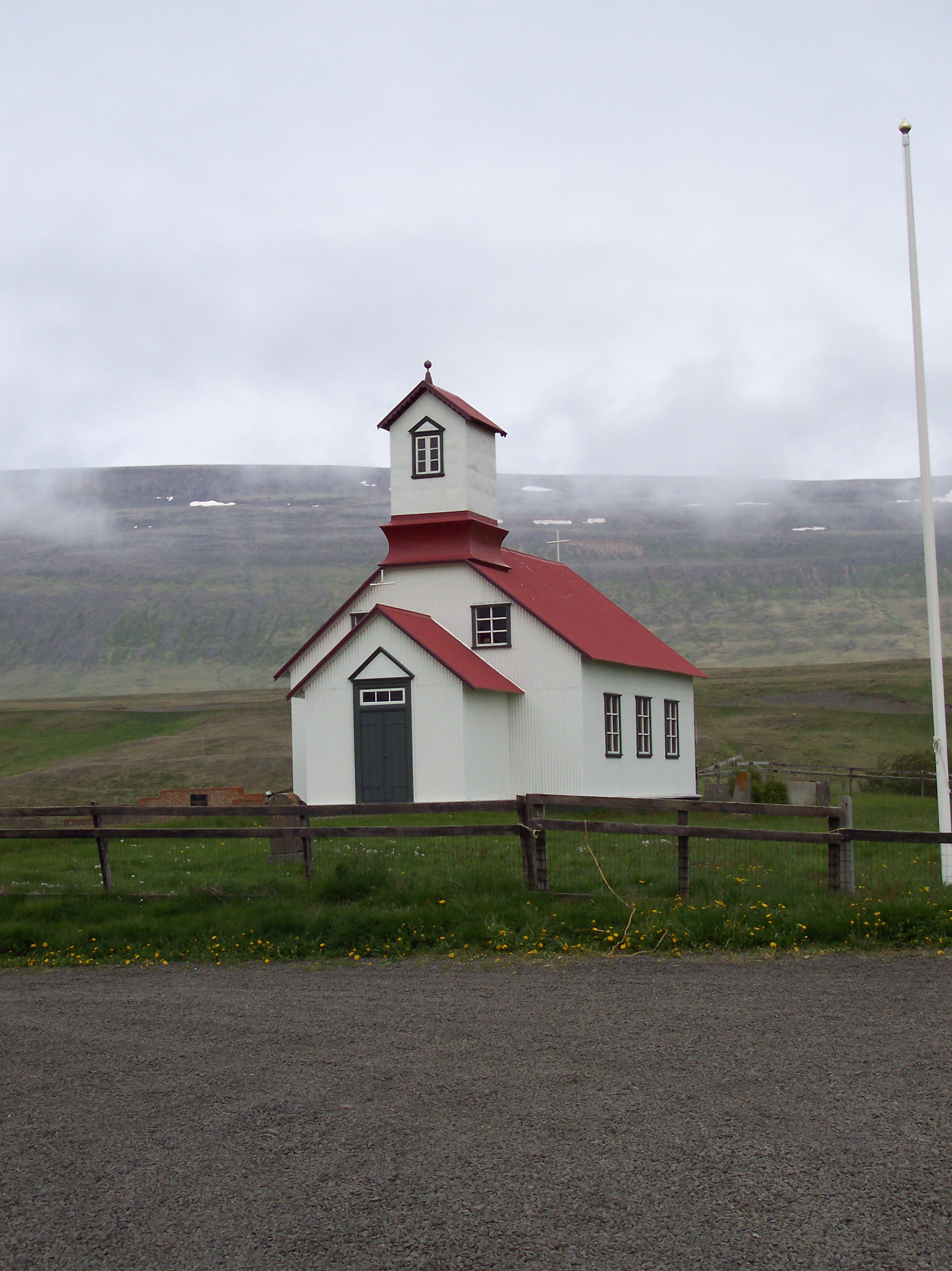
Víðidalstungukirkja, constructed in 1889

== Births ==
- 9 February – Tryggvi Þórhallsson, prime minister of Iceland (1927–1932)
- 26 December – Gunnfríður Jónsdóttir, sculptor
