= Hørring cabinet =

Danish government from 1897 to 1900

Cabinet of Hørring
- 20th Cabinet of Denmark

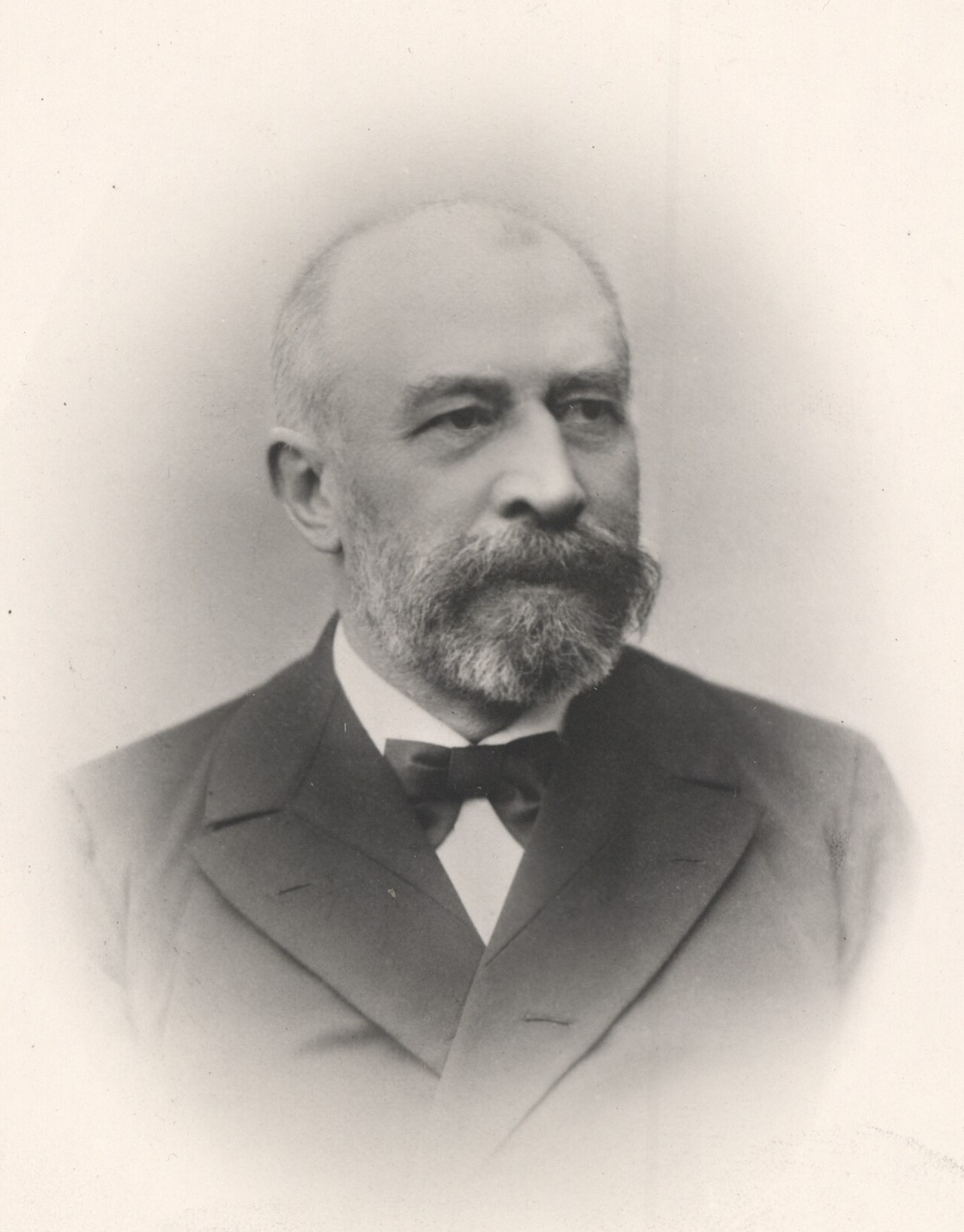
- Date formed: 23 May 1897
- Date dissolved: 27 April 1900

People and organisations
- Head of state: Christian IX
- Head of government: Hugo Egmont Hørring
- No. of ministers: 7
- Ministers removed: 4
- Total no. of members: 9

History
- Election: None
- Legislature term: 1895–1899
- Predecessor: Reedtz-Thott
- Successor: Sehested

The Hørring cabinet was formed on 7 August 1897 and consisted entirely of members of the party Højre. It was created following Tage Reedtz-Thott's resignation as Council President, when Hugo Egmont Hørring of the conservative party Højre became the leader of the new Danish cabinet, replacing the cabinet of Reedtz-Thott.

The cabinet was replaced by the Sehested cabinet on 27 April 1900.

== List of ministers and portfolios ==
The cabinet consisted of these ministers:

Some of the terms in the table begin before 7 August 1897 or end after 27 April 1900 because the minister was in the Reedtz-Thott or Sehested cabinet as well.

Cabinet members
Portfolio	Minister	Took office	Left office
Council President & Minister for Finance	Hugo Egmont Hørring	7 August 1897	27 April 1900
Minister of Justice & Minister for Iceland	Nicolai Reimer Rump	23 May 1896	28 August 1899
Minister of Justice & Minister for Iceland	Hugo Egmont Hørring	28 August 1899	27 April 1900
Minister of War	Christian Tuxen	7 August 1897	28 August 1899
Minister of War	Gustav Schnack	28 August 1899	24 July 1901
Minister of the Navy & Minister of Foreign Affairs	Niels Frederik Ravn	4 January 1879	27 April 1900
Kultus Minister	Hans Valdemar Sthyr	7 August 1897	27 April 1900
Minister of the Interior	Vilhelm Bardenfleth	7 August 1897	28 August 1899
Minister of the Interior	Ludvig Bramsen	28 August 1899	24 July 1901
Minister for Agriculture	Alfred Hage	7 August 1897	27 April 1900

Preceded by Reedtz-Thott Cabinet	Cabinet of Denmark; 1897 – 1900	Succeeded by Sehested Cabinet
