= 1892 in Iceland =

- Decades: 1870s; 1880s; 1890s; 1900s; 1910s
- See also: Other events of 1892; Timeline of Icelandic history

Events in the year 1892 in Iceland.

== Incumbents ==
- Monarch: Christian IX
- Minister for Iceland: Johannes Nellemann

== Events ==
- The Ministerial Residence Ráðherrabústaðurinn is constructed on Flateyri.

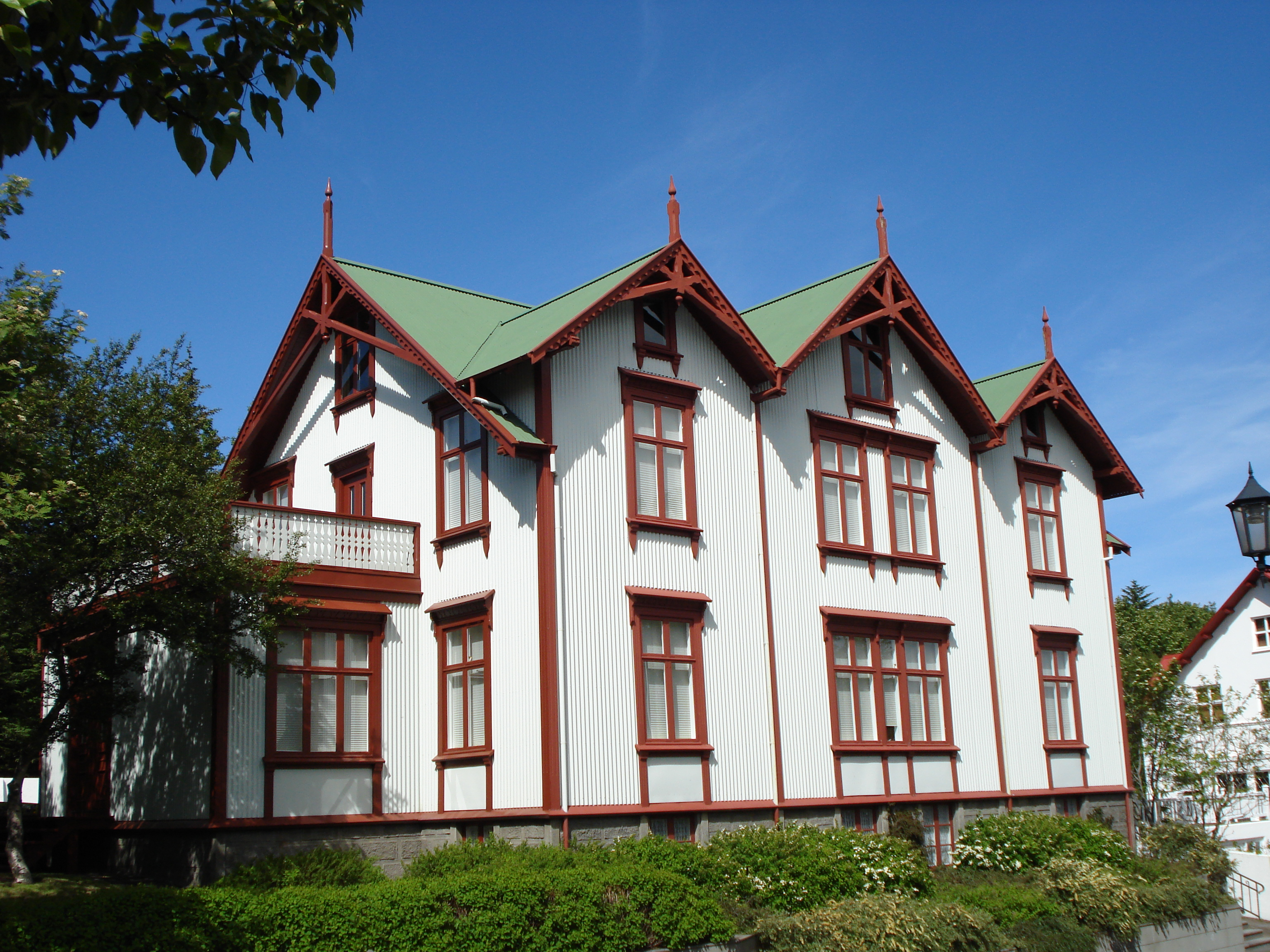
Ráðherrabústaðurinn, constructed in 1892
