= 1894 in Iceland =

- Decades: 1870s; 1880s; 1890s; 1900s; 1910s
- See also: Other events of 1894; Timeline of Icelandic history

Events in the year 1894 in Iceland.

== Incumbents ==
- Monarch: Christian IX
- Minister for Iceland: Johannes Nellemann

== Events ==
- Hið íslenska kvenfélag is founded in Reykjavík.
- Serfdom (Vistarband) is abolished in Iceland.
- Auðkúlukirkja is constructed at the Svínavatn lake, North Iceland.
