= 1891 in Iceland =

- Decades: 1870s; 1880s; 1890s; 1900s; 1910s
- See also: Other events of 1891; Timeline of Icelandic history

Events in the year 1891 in Iceland.

== Incumbents ==
- Monarch: Christian IX
- Minister for Iceland: Johannes Nellemann

== Events ==
- Icelandic Police began operating in places outside of Reykjavík

== Deaths ==
- 19 August – Gestur Pálsson, writer (b. 1852)
- 15 May – Pétur Pétursson, the fourth Bishop of Iceland, served in office until 1889
