= 1890 in Iceland =

- Decades: 1870s; 1880s; 1890s; 1900s; 1910s
- See also: Other events of 1890; Timeline of Icelandic history

Events in the year 1890 in Iceland.

== Incumbents ==
- Monarch: Christian IX
- Minister for Iceland: Johannes Nellemann

== Events ==
- Staðarbakkakirkja church is constructed in Miðfjörður.

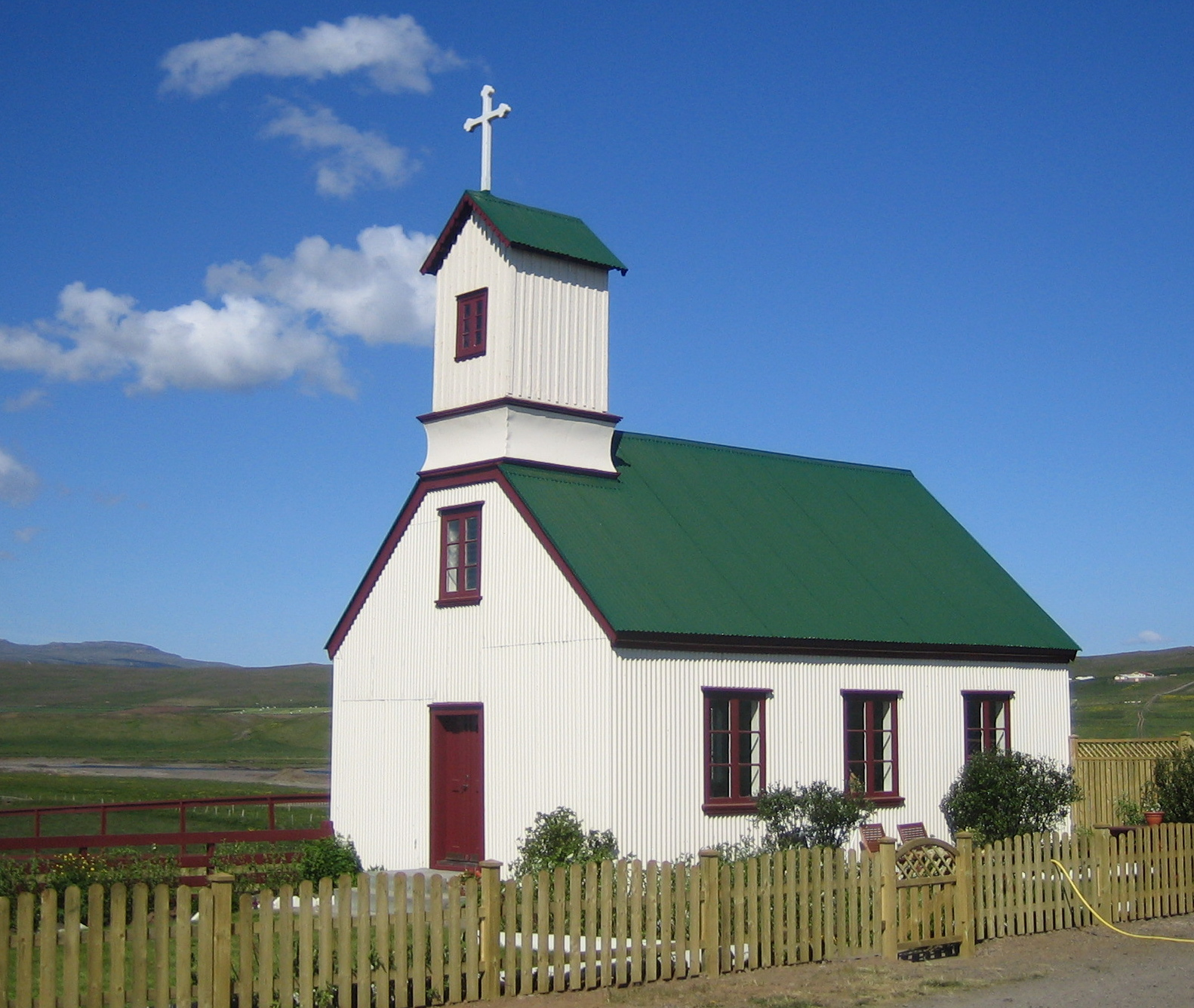
Staðarbakkakirkja, constructed in 1890.
