= 1898 in Iceland =

- Decades: 1870s; 1880s; 1890s; 1900s; 1910s
- See also: Other events of 1898; Timeline of Icelandic history

Events in the year 1898 in Iceland.

== Incumbents ==
- Monarch: Christian IX
- Minister for Iceland: Nicolai Reimer Rump

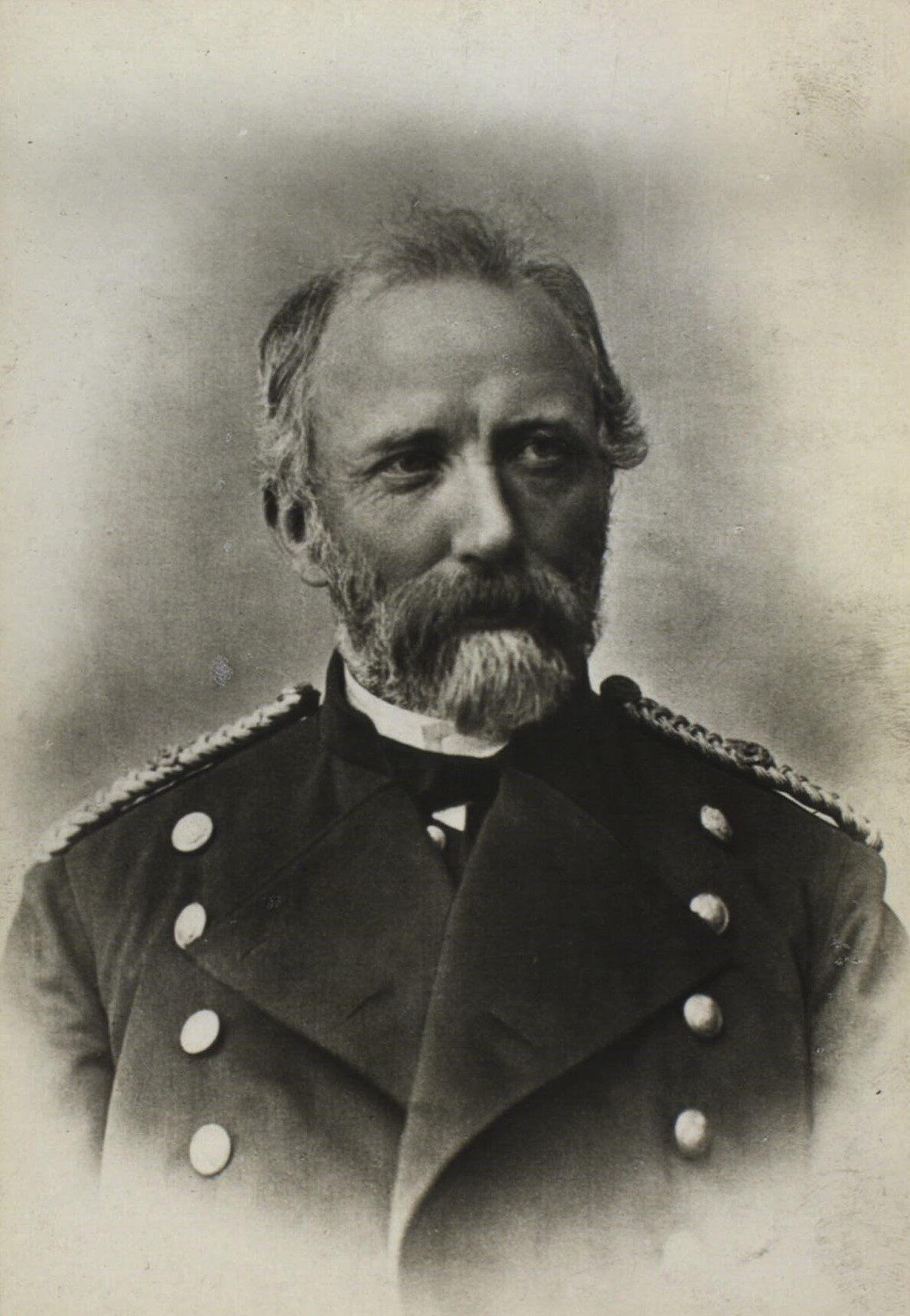
Nicolai Reimer Rump, Minister for Iceland.

== Events ==
- Holdsveikraspítalinn í Laugarnesi (Leprosy Hospital) is established in Laugarnes.
