= 1897 in Iceland =

- Decades: 1870s; 1880s; 1890s; 1900s; 1910s
- See also: Other events of 1897; Timeline of Icelandic history

Events in the year 1897 in Iceland.

== Incumbents ==
- Monarch: Christian IX
- Minister for Iceland: Nicolai Reimer Rump

== Events ==
- Garðskagaviti lighthouse is constructed on Suðurnes.
- Gróttuviti lighthouse is constructed on Grótta.
