= 1895 in Iceland =

- Decades: 1870s; 1880s; 1890s; 1900s; 1910s
- See also: Other events of 1895; Timeline of Icelandic history

Events in the year 1895 in Iceland.

== Incumbents ==
- Monarch: Christian IX
- Minister for Iceland: Johannes Nellemann

== Events ==
- Litlibær, a historical turf farmstead in Northwest Iceland was constructed.
- The first women's magazine Framsókn is founded by Ingibjörg Skaptadóttir and Sigríður Þorsteinsdóttir.

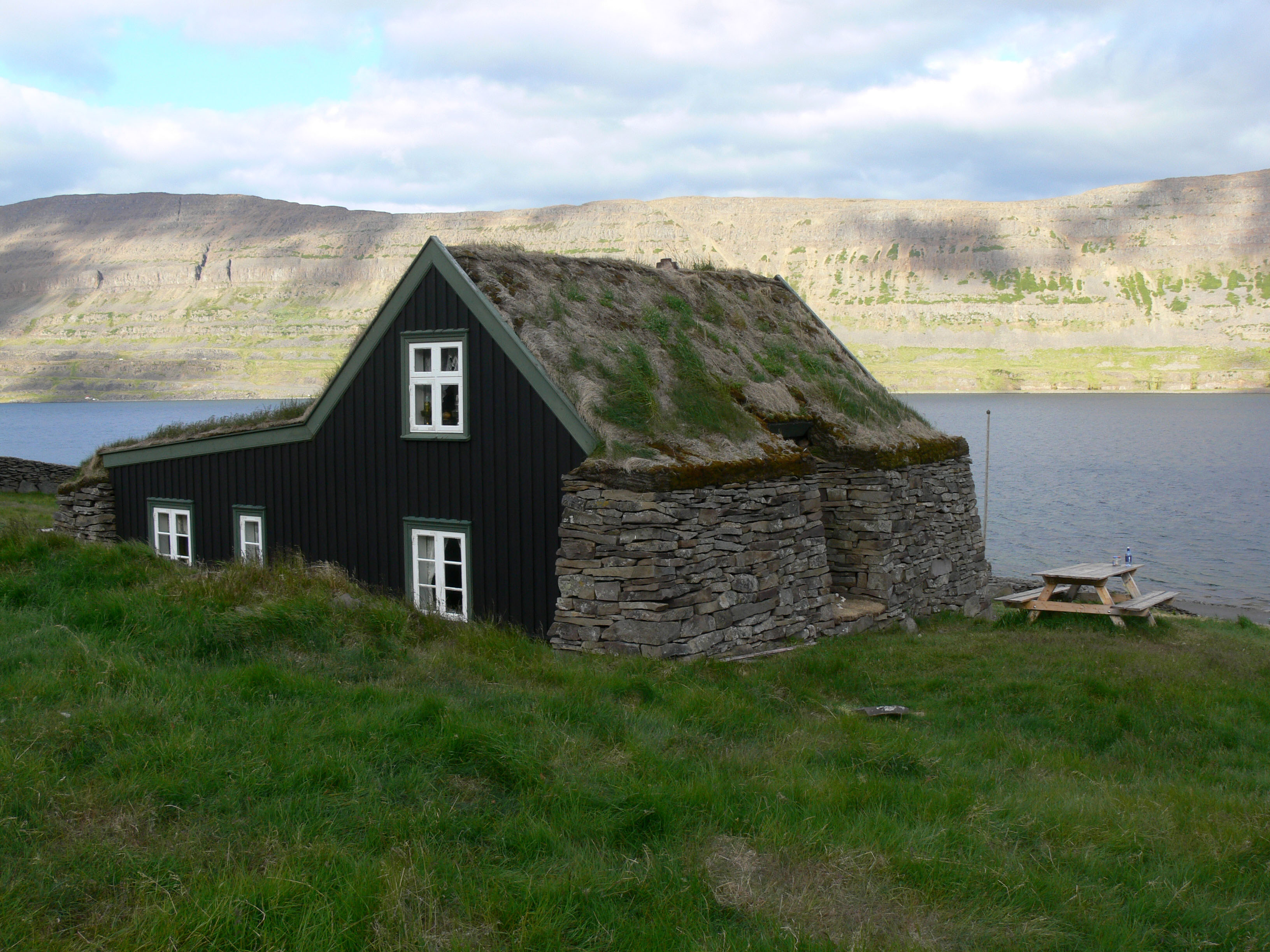
Litlibær, constructed in 1895.

== Births ==
- January 21 – Davíð Stefánsson, poet
