= Johan Henrik Deuntzer =

Danish professor and politician (1845–1918)

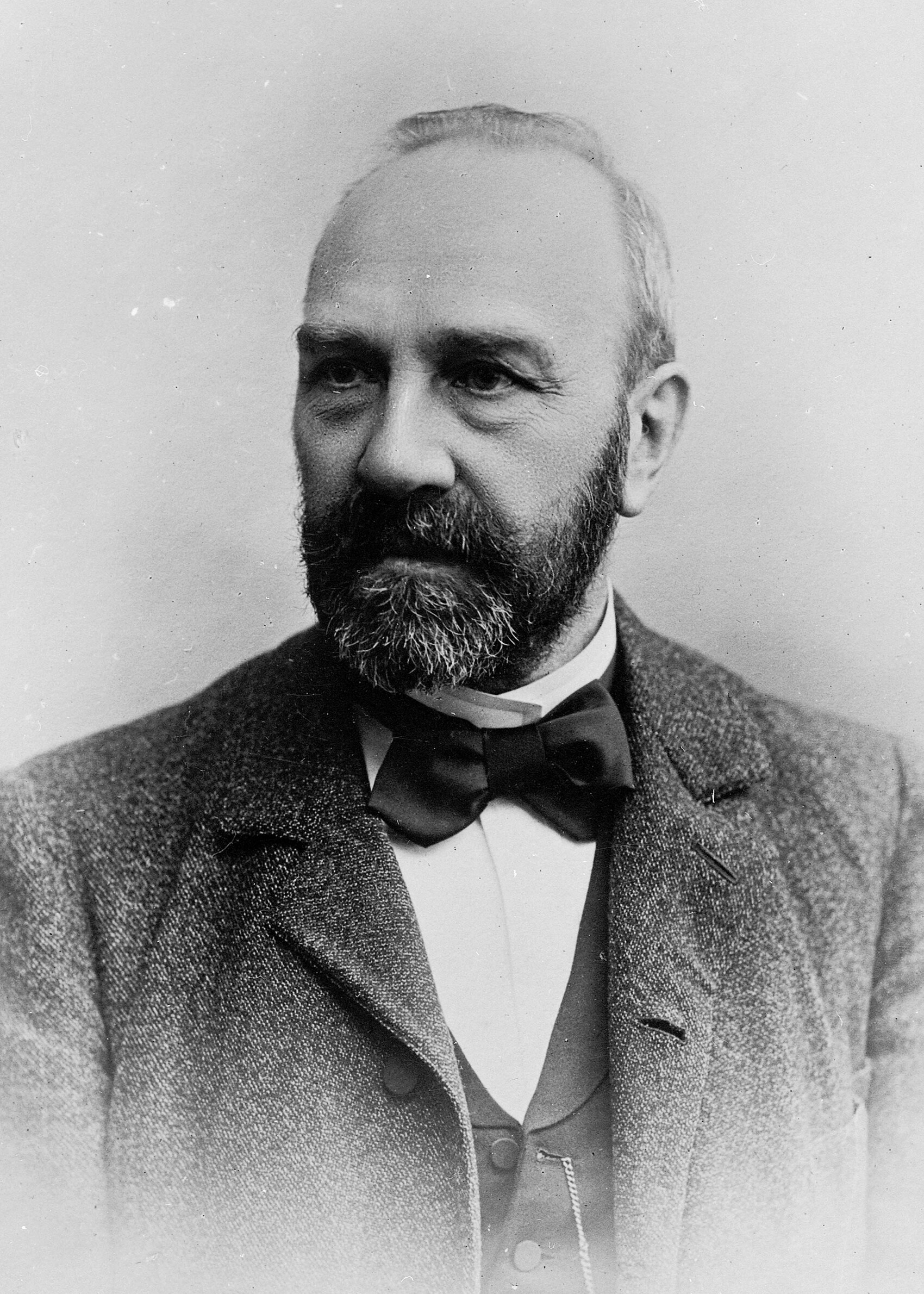

Council President of Denmark
- In office 24 July 1901 – 14 January 1905
- Monarch: Christian IX
- Preceded by: Hannibal Sehested
- Succeeded by: J. C. Christensen

Personal details
- Born: 20 May 1845 Copenhagen
- Died: 16 November 1918 (aged 73) Charlottenlund
- Party: Venstre, Danish Social Liberal Party
- Education: University of Copenhagen

Johan Henrik Deuntzer (20 May 1845 – 16 November 1918) was a Danish professor and politician who served as a member of the Liberal Venstre party until 1905 where he joined the Danish Social Liberal Party. He was Council President and Foreign Minister of Denmark from 1901 to 1905 as the leader of the Cabinet of Deuntzer.

== Biography ==
Deuntzer was born in Copenhagen as the son of architect Johan Jacob Deuntzer (1808–1875) and Sophie Margrethe Kornbech (1815–1892). He graduated cand. Jur. from the University of Copenhagen in 1867. In 1871 he made a study trip to Vienna, Paris and London. He was professor in the department of civil law from 1872 to 1901. In 1894 he received an honorary doctor at the University of Copenhagen. Deuntzer was a parliamentarian from 1901 to 1913. From 1914 to 1918 he was one of the king's appointed members of the Landsting.

Political offices
Preceded by Hannibal Sehested	Council President of Denmark; 24 July 1901 – 14 January 1905	Succeeded by Jens Christian Christensen
Preceded by Hannibal Sehested	Foreign Minister of Denmark; 24 July 1901 – 14 January 1905	Succeeded by Frederik Raben-Levetzau
