= Christian Sophus Klein =

Danish politician

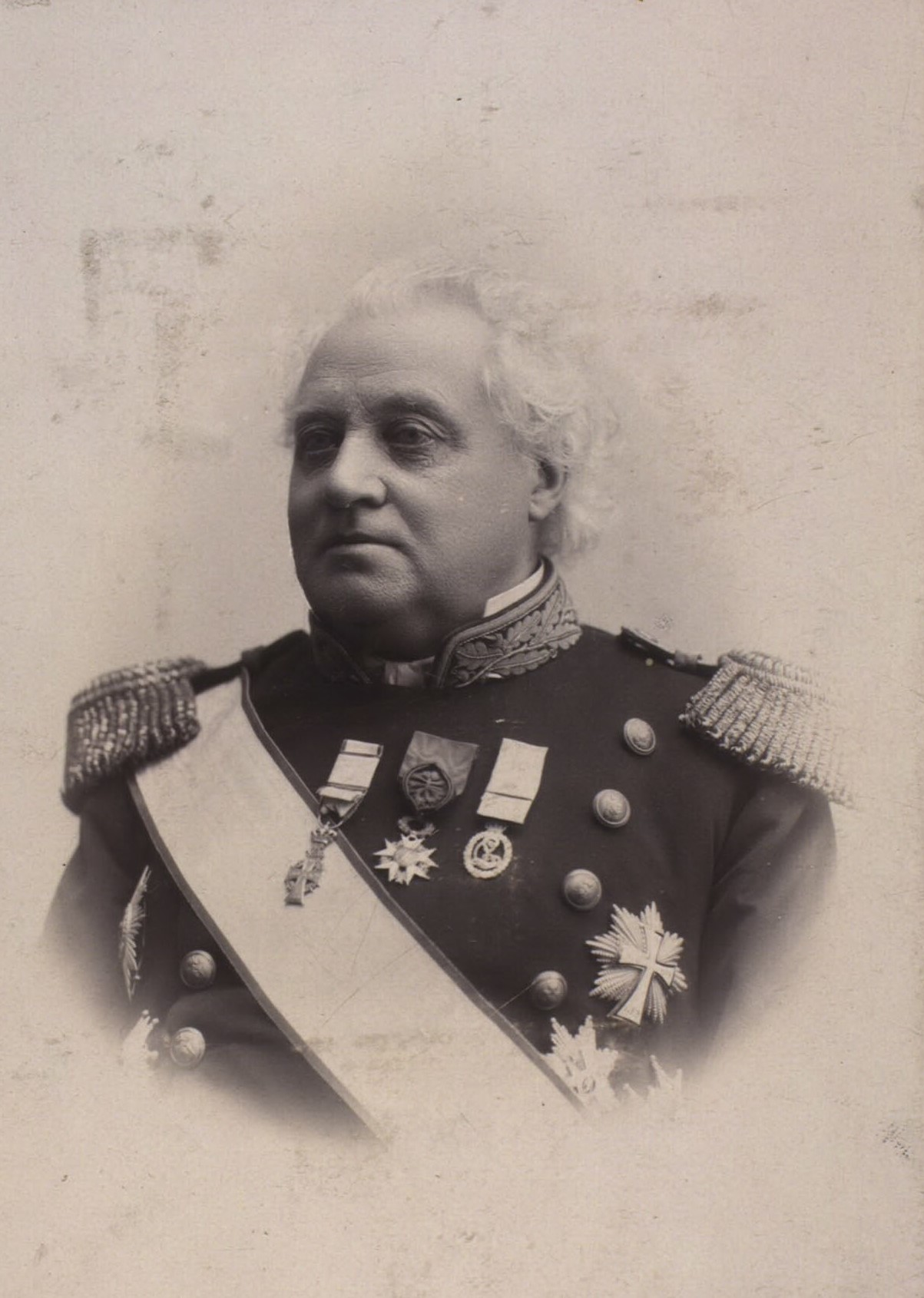
- Christian Sophus Klein
- Born: 17 August 1824; Copenhagen, Denmark
- Died: 9 January 1900 (aged 75); Copenhagen, Denmark
- Occupations: Politician, lawyer
- Years active: 1860–present

Christian Sophus Klein (17 August 1824 – 9 January 1900) was a Danish politician, a member of the National Party. He was Minister of Justice from 1872 to 1875, and Minister for Iceland from 1874 to 1875.

== Biography ==
Klein was born on 17 August 1824 in Copenhagen. He served as president of Sø- og Handelsretten (1862–72), and an accessor in Denmark's supreme court between 1877 and 1891.

He was a member of the Folketing between1858–1898, and served as the Justice Minister between 1872 and 1875. After implementing the Constitutional Law for Iceland, he served as minister for Iceland between 1874 and 1875.

Political offices
Preceded by Andreas Frederik Krieger	Justice Minister of Denmark; 1 July 1872 – 11 June 1875	Succeeded by Johannes Nellemann
