= Strandegård =

Manor house near Præstø, Denmark

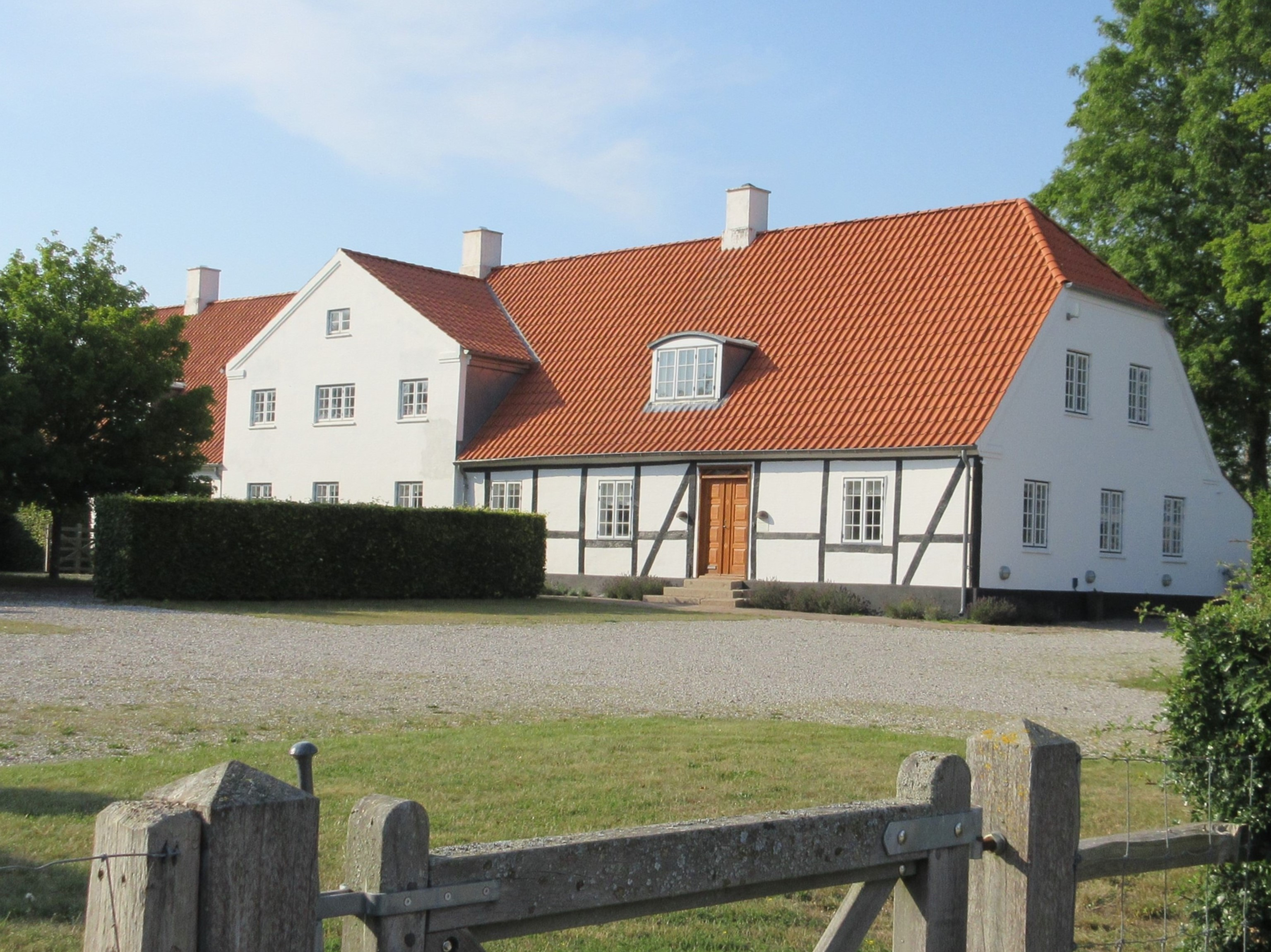
- Strandegård in 2020
- Interactive map of the Strandegård area

General information
- Location: St. Elmuevej 2; 4640 Faxe, Denmark
- Coordinates: 55°11′13″N 12°6′45″E

Strandegaard is a manor house and estate located in Faxe Municipality, Denmark. The estate was acquired by Otto Thott and two sisters in 1631 and is still owned by the Thott/Reedtz-Thott family. It is managed as an organic farm and other activities include Feddet Beach Camping & Resort.

== History ==
=== Early history ===
Strandegård Manor was established by Axel Sehested in 1662 at the site where the village of Fiskerhoved had until then been located. The area had until then belonged to the Crown but was by Frederick III presented to Sehested after the Second Northern War. Sehested later that same year sold the estate to a merchant from Copenhagen named Hans Pedersen Klein. Petersen Klein's widow Magdalene Mogensdatter was after her husband's death second time married to Ernst Volcher.

In 1686, Magdalene Mogensdatter sold Strandegård to merchant Peder Jensen. His widow, Kirsten Ellen Andersdatter, kept the estate until her death in 1707. Strandegaard was then sold in public auction to Christian Juel. His widow, Anne Margrethe Krag, kept the estate after her husband's death in 1717, In 1731, after struggling economically for years, like many other landowners of the time, she had to sell Strandegaard.

=== Thott family ===
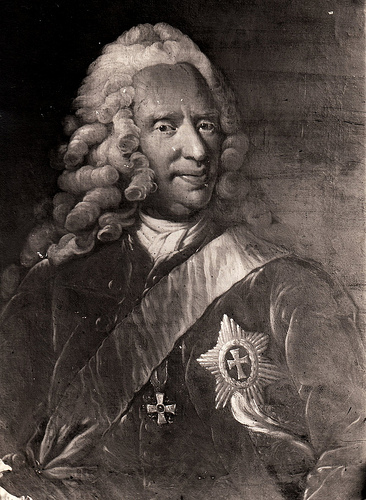
Otto Thott

The new owners were Otto Thott and his sisters Dorothea and Anne Thott. Otto Thott was already the owner of the estates Gavnø and Lindersvold. Dorothea Thott died in 1738 and Otto Thott bought Anne Thott in 1740.

Otto Thott had no children. In his will of 1780, he converted his estates into a stamhus for his maternal uncle's grandson, Holger Reedtz, who in 1786 took the name Reedtz-Thott. The legal effect of a stamhus was that the estate could not be pledged, sold or divided between heirs.

In 1805, Otto Reedtz-Thott was able to establish the Barony of Gavnø from the estates. His son, Tage Reedtz-Thott, succeeded his father in 1862. He was active in politics and served as Council President from 1785 to 1786. The barony was dissolved in 1921. This happened in accordance with the lensafløsningslov of 1919. Tage Reedtz-Thott's son. Otto Reedtz-Thott, succeeded his father in 1923 but already died in 1927. He had no children and Strandegård was therefore passed to a cousin, Holger Reedtz-Thott, while another cousin's son, Axel Reedtz-Thott, received Gavnø. Holger Reedtz-Thott had no children and therefore left Strandegård to Axel Reedtz-Thott.

Axel Reedtz-Thott ceded Strandegård to his youngest son Ivan Reedtz-Thott in 1978. His eldest son, His elder son, Otto Reedtz-Thott, had succeeded him on Gavnø in 1973.

== Today ==
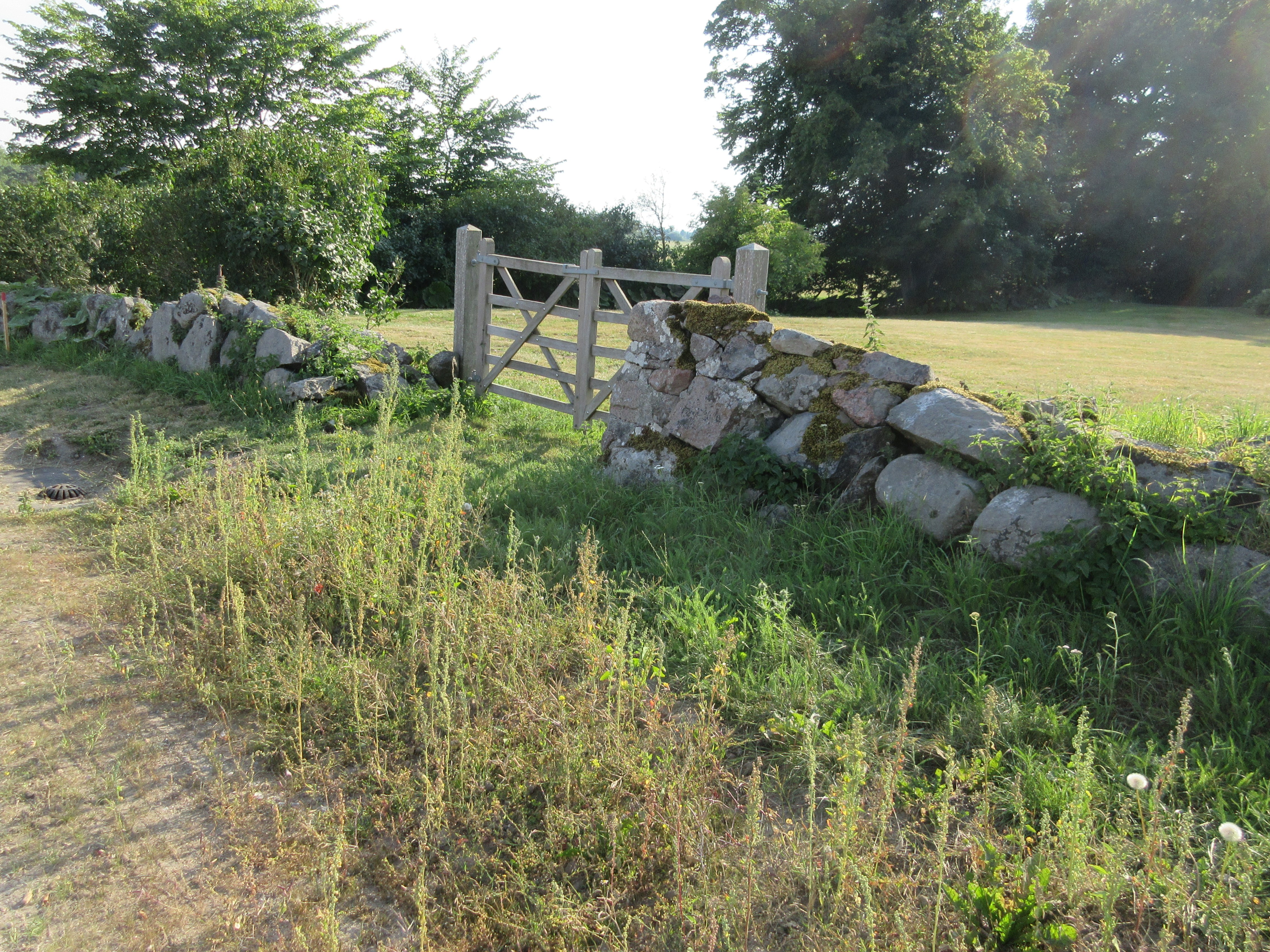
The Strandegård estate in 2020

The estate has a total area of approximately 1,300 hectares of which just over half is farmland and the rest is forest and other natural habitats. Strandegaard is managed as an organic farm.

Other activities include Feddet Beach Camping & Resort. A project under Realdania's Manor Houses of the Future programme has worked with realizing new synergies between the organic farm and the hospitality-related activities.

== List of owners ==
- (1662) Axel Sehested
- (1662-1667) Hans Pedersen Klein
- (1667-1671) Magdalene Mogensdatter, gift 1) Klein 2) Volcher
- (1671-1683) Jokum Ernst Volcher
- (1683-1686) Magdalene Mogensdatter, gift 1) Klein 2) Volcher
- (1686-1699) Peder Jensen
- (1699-1707) Kirsten Ellen Andersdatter, gift Jensen
- (1707-1717) Christian Juel
- (1717-1731) Anne Margrethe Krag, gift Juel
- (1731-1738) Dorothea Thott
- (1731-1740) Anne Thott
- (1731-1785) Otto Thott
- (1785-1797) Holger Reedtz-Thott
- (1797-1862) Otto Reedtz-Thott
- (1862-1923) Tage Reedtz-Thott
- (1923-1927) Otto Reedtz-Thott
- (1927-1941) Holger Reedtz-Thott
- (1941-1978) Axel Reedtz-Thott
- (1978- ) Ivan Reedtz-Thott
