= Hannibal Sehested (council president) =

Danish landowner and Council President (1842-1924)

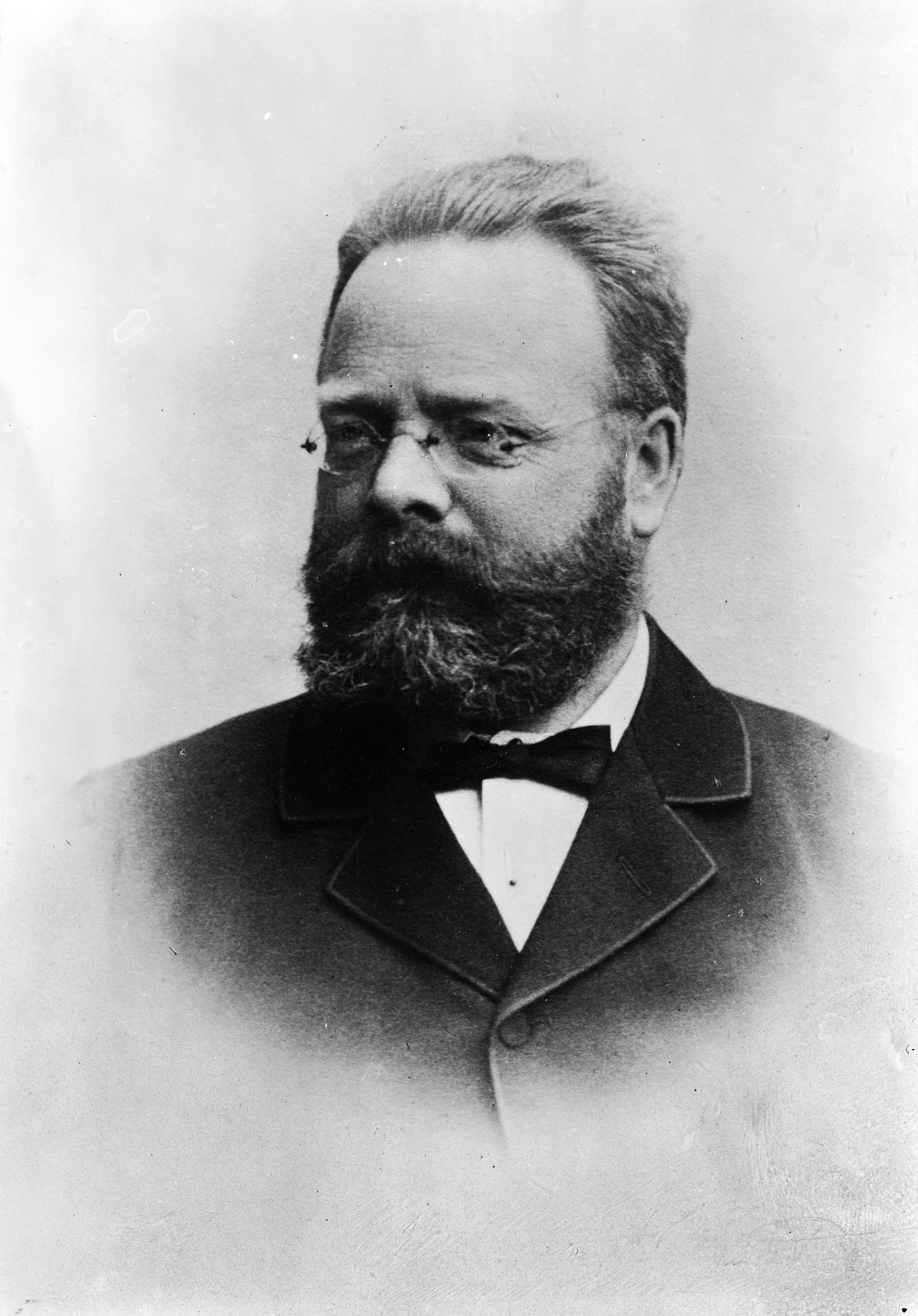

Council President of Denmark
- In office 27 April 1900 – 24 July 1901
- Monarch: Christian IX
- Preceded by: Hugo Egmont Hørring
- Succeeded by: Johan Henrik Deuntzer

Personal details
- Born: 16 November 1842 Gudme, Funen, Denmark
- Died: 19 September 1924 (aged 81) Gudme, Funen, Denmark
- Party: Højre
- Education: University of Copenhagen

Hannibal Sehested (16 November 1842 – 19 September 1924) was a Danish landowner and Council President from 27 April 1900 to 24 July 1901 as the leader of the Cabinet of Sehested. He was the last Danish Council President appointed by the king without support from the Danish Parliament before Denmark switched to a parliamentary system and the secret ballot.

== Biography ==
Sehested was born at Gudme on the island of Funen, Denmark. He was the son of Niels Frederik Bernhard Sehested and his wife Charlotte Christine Linde. He became a student at Herlufsholm School in 1860 and graduated from the University of Copenhagen in 1869. In 1886 he was elected to the County Council and represented the Højre party for the 6th County Council until 1910. Sehested took over Stamhuset Broholm in 1894. He was made a Knight of the Order of the Dannebrog 1891, Dannebrogsmand 1898, Commander of the 1st Degree 1901 and Grand Cross Knight 1901.

Political offices
Preceded by Hugo Egmont Hørring	Council President of Denmark; 27 April 1900 – 24 July 1901	Succeeded by Johan Henrik Deuntzer
Preceded by Niels F. Ravn	Foreign Minister of Denmark; 27 April 1900 – 24 July 1901	Succeeded by Johan Henrik Deuntzer
