= Niels Frederik Ravn =

Danish vice admiral and politician (1826–1910)

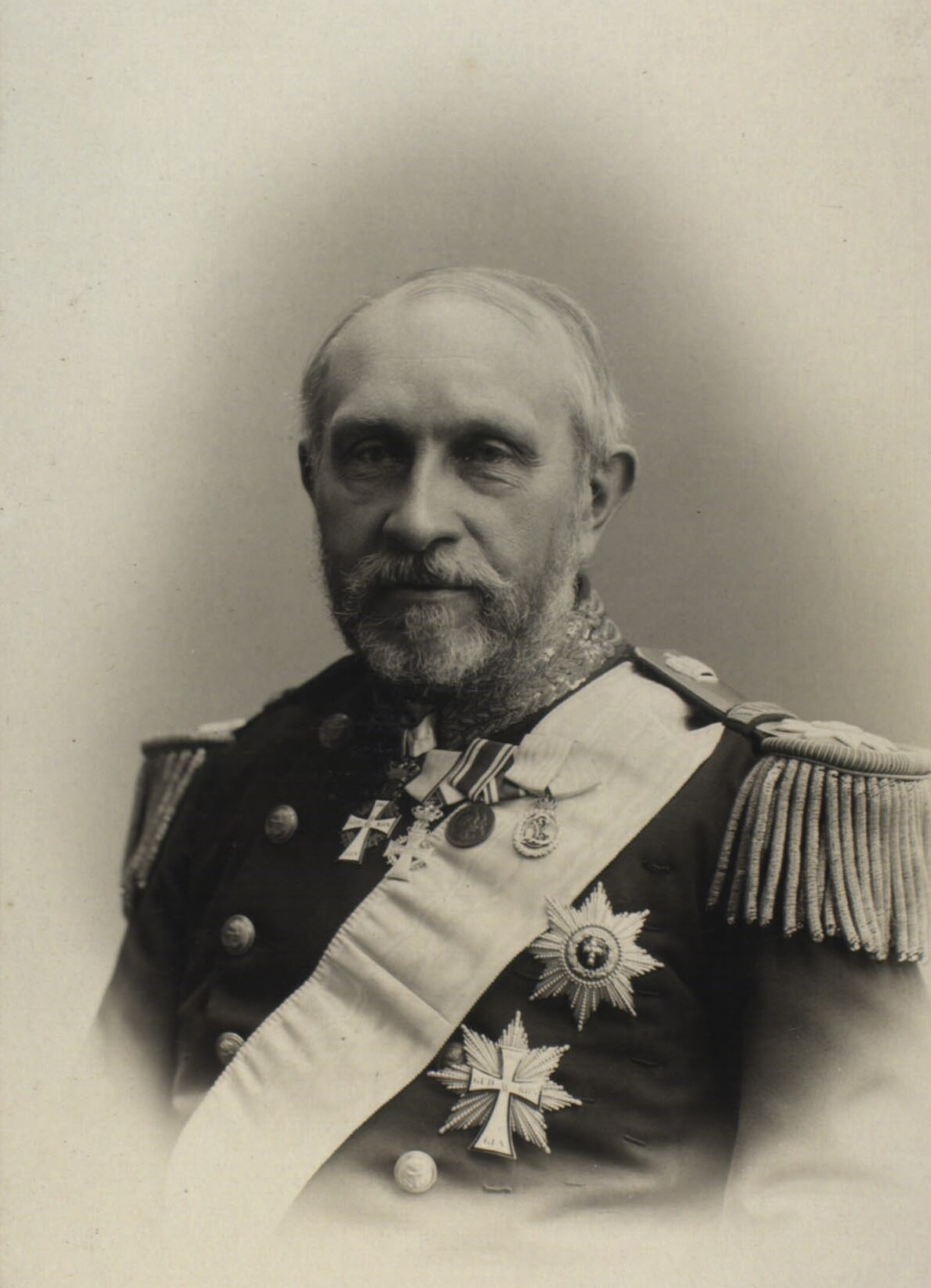

Minister of Foreign Affairs
- In office 25 May 1897 – 27 April 1900
- Prime Minister: Hugo Egmont Hørring

Personal details
- Born: 18 June 1826 Copenhagen, Denmark
- Died: 12 June 1910 (aged 83) Holmen, Copenhagen, Denmark
- Profession: Navy official

Niels Frederik Ravn (18 June 1826 – 12 June 1910) was a Danish vice admiral and politician who held various cabinet posts including minister of war, minister of navy and minister of foreign affairs.

== Biography ==
Ravn was born in Copenhagen on 18 June 1826. His parents were linen merchant Stephen Ravn and Marie F. Bünge. He became a cadet in 1838, a second lieutenant in 1845, and a first lieutenant in 1851. He participated in the first and second Schleswig wars. Following the wars he taught mathematics at the Naval Cadet Academy. He was promoted as rear admiral in 1885 and retired from the navy with the rank of vice admiral in 1891.

Ravn was a member of the conservative Højre party and served at the Parliament between 1873 and 1901. On 21 May 1873 he was named as the minister of navy in the cabinet of Ludvig Holstein-Holsteinsborg. He was appointed minister of navy to the cabinet led by Christen Andreas Fonnesbech on 14 July 1874. He was also named as the minister of war to the same cabinet on 28 August 1874. He held both posts until 11 November 1875. From 25 May 1897 to 27 April 1900 he served as the minister of foreign affairs in the cabinet of Hugo Egmont Hørring.

Ravn died in Holmen, Copenhagen, on 12 June 1910 and buried there.
