= Tage Reedtz-Thott =

Danish politician (1839–1923)

Baron Tage Reedtz-Thott
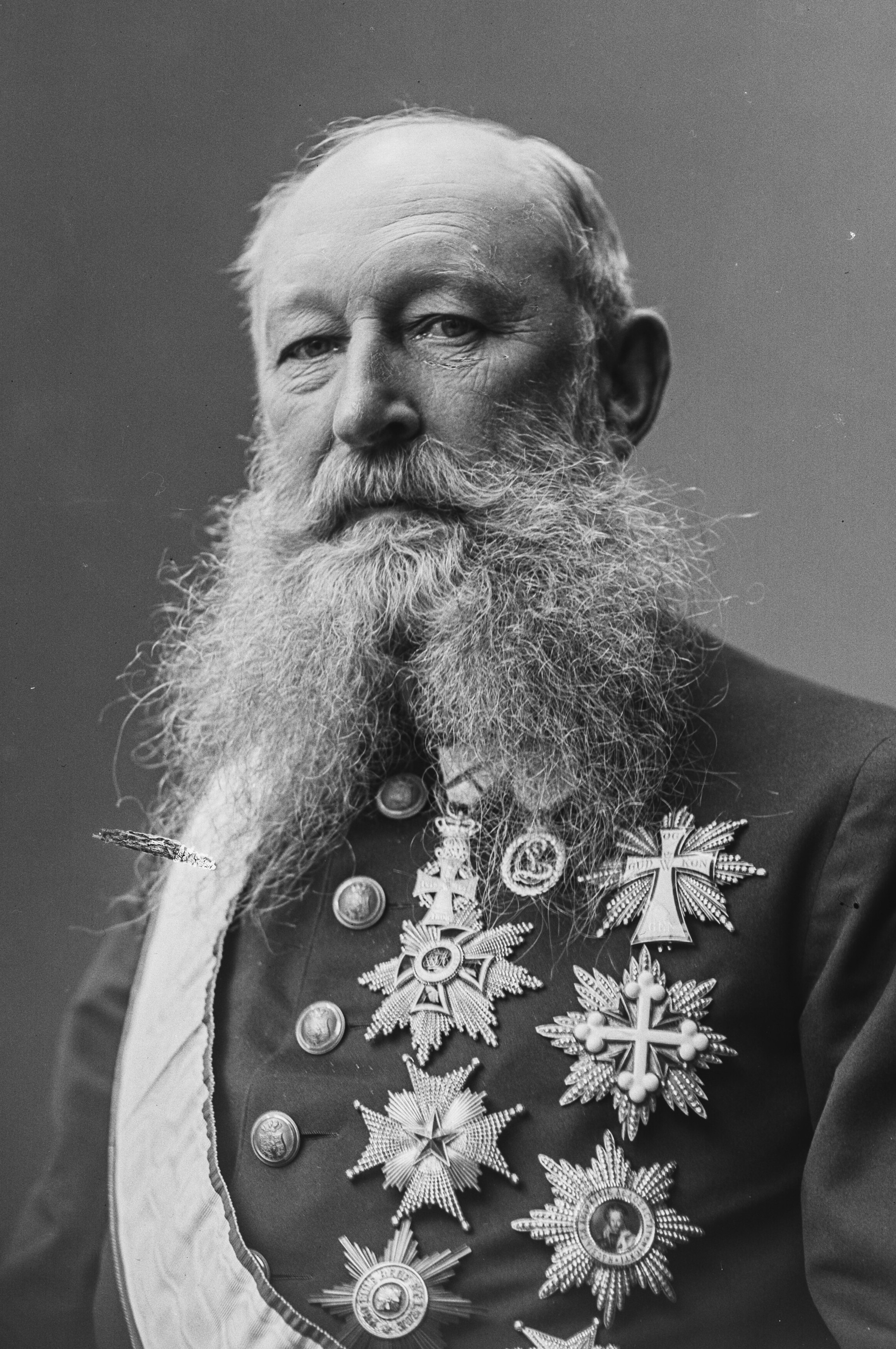

Council President of Denmark
- In office 7 August 1894 – 23 May 1897
- Monarch: Christian IX
- Preceded by: Jacob Brønnum Scavenius Estrup
- Succeeded by: Hugo Egmont Hørring

Minister of Foreign Affairs
- In office 3 June 1892 – 23 May 1897
- Monarch: Christian IX
- Prime Minister: Jacob Brønnum Scavenius Estrup
- Preceded by: Otto Rosenørn-Lehn
- Succeeded by: Niels Frederik Ravn

Personal details
- Born: Kjeld Thor Tage Otto Reedtz-Thott; 13 March 1839 Gavnø
- Died: 27 November 1923 (aged 84) Gavnø
- Party: Højre

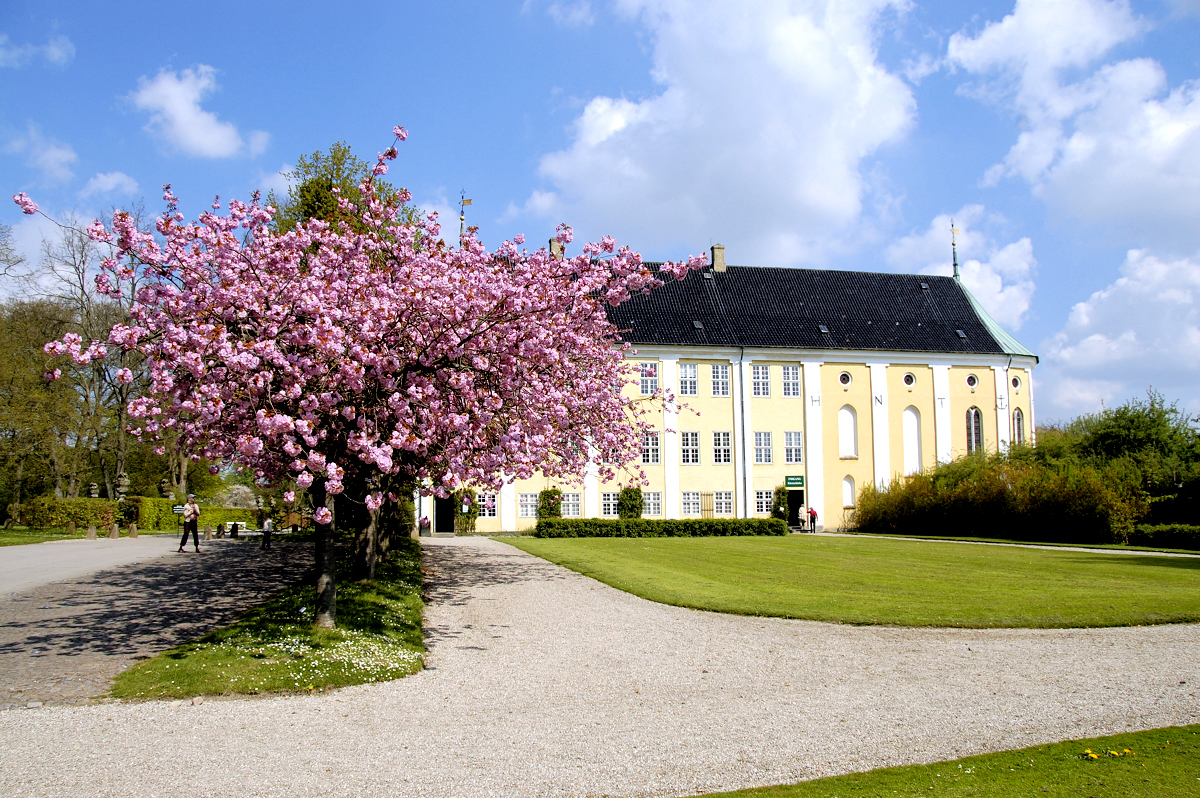
Gavnø Castle

Kjeld Thor Tage Otto, Friherre Reedtz-Thott (13 March 1839 – 27 November 1923), was a Danish politician, landowner and member of the Højre political party. He was Council President of Denmark from 1894 to 1897 as the leader of the Reedtz-Thott Cabinet.

== Biography ==
Tage Reedtz-Thott was born at Gavnø Castle on the island of Gavnø near Naestved, Denmark. He was the son of the baron Otto Reedtz-Thott (1785-1862) and Karen Julie Elisabeth Frederikke Fønns (1814-1844). He graduated cand. phil. in 1860. He continued his studies in Geneva and Paris. He took over the Barony Gavnø upon the death of his father in 1862. The Barony of Gavnø comprised the estates Gavnø, Lindesvold and Strandegård.

In 1886, Reedtz-Thott was elected to the Folketing and in 1892, became Minister of Foreign Affairs. He became Council President of Denmark in 1894 and resigned in 1897. He became a member of the Defense Commission in 1902 and in 1906 of the Commission on the Ministry of Foreign Affairs and Diplomacy. He had a seat on the Ecclesiastical Committee in 1904–07. In 1910 he did not receive re-election to the Folketing. He died during 1923 at Gavnø and was buried at Vejlø Church (Vejlø Kirke) in Næstved.

== Decorations and Honours ==
Danish

Knight of the Order of the Elephant
Grand Cross of the Order of the Dannebrog, with Diamonds
Dannebrogordenens Hæderstegn
The Commemorative Medal for the Golden Wedding of King Christian IX and Queen Louise, in silver

Foreign

Order of Leopold, Grand Cordon (Belgium)
Grand Cross of the Order of the Redeemer (Greece)
Grand Cross of the Order of Saints Maurice and Lazarus (Italy)
Grand Cross of the House Order of the Wendish Crown (Mecklenburg-Schwerin)
Order of the Rising Sun, Grand Cordon (Japan)
Order of the White Eagle (Russia)
Commander Grand Cross of the Order of the Polar Star (Sweden)
Grand Cross of the Order of Charles III (Spain)
Grand Cross of the Order of Leopold (Austria)

Political offices
Preceded by Otto Rosenørn-Lehn	Foreign Minister of Denmark; 3 June 1892 – 23 May 1897	Succeeded by Niels Frederik Ravn
Preceded by Jacob Brønnum Scavenius Estrup	Council President of Denmark; 7 August 1894 – 23 May 1897	Succeeded by Hugo Egmont Hørring
