= Justice Minister (Denmark) =

Danish cabinet member

Minister of Justice
- Justitsminister
- State coat of arms of the Kingdom of Denmark

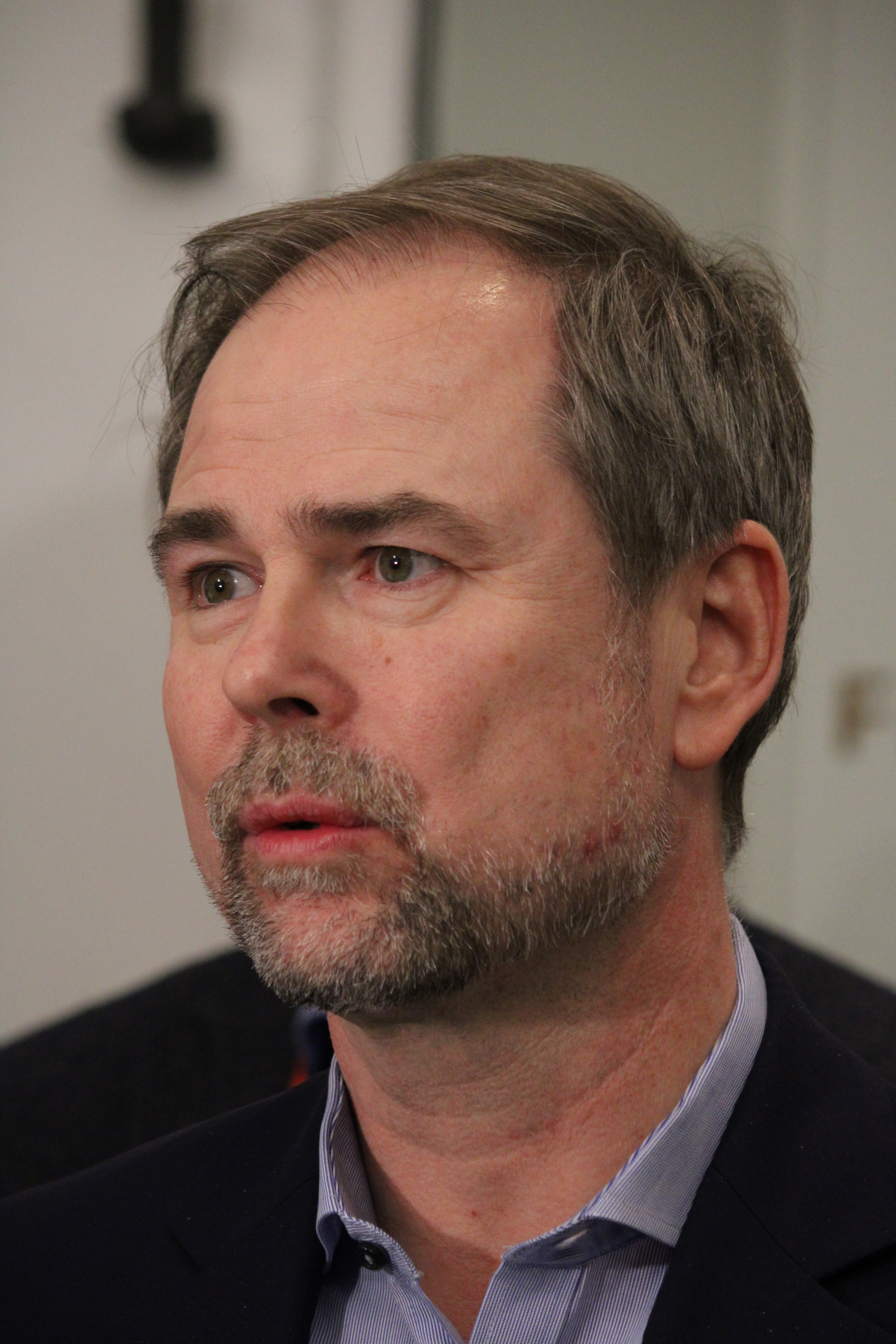
- Incumbent; Nicolai Wammen since 3 June 2026
- Ministry of Justice
- Type: Minister
- Member of: Cabinet; State Council
- Reports to: the Prime minister
- Seat: Slotsholmen
- Appointer: The Monarch; (on the advice of the Prime Minister)
- Formation: 22 March 1848; 178 years ago
- First holder: Carl Emil Bardenfleth
- Succession: depending on the order in the State Council
- Deputy: Permanent Secretary
- Salary: 1.624.503,02 DKK (€217,931), in 2026
- Website: Official website

The Danish Minister of Justice (Danish: Justitsministeren) is the head of the Ministry of Justice and a cabinet member. As of 2026, the Minister of Justice is Nicolai Wammen.

== Legislation ==
In 2023, the Justice Minister announced that the Danish government would ban public desecration of religious scriptures such as the Quran.

In 2024, the Justice Minister announced that the Danish government would require parental consent for children under the age of 15 to create profiles on social media platforms such as TikTok.

== List of justice ministers (1848–present) ==
=== Ministers under Frederick VII (1848–1863) ===
No.	Portrait	Name (born–died)	Term of office			Political party	Government	Ref.
No.	Portrait	Name (born–died)	Took office	Left office	Time in office	Political party	Government	Ref.
1		Carl Emil Bardenfleth (1807–1857)	22 March 1848	13 July 1851	3 years, 113 days	Independent	Moltke I–II	
2		Anton Wilhelm Scheel (1799–1879)	13 July 1851	15 January 1855	3 years, 186 days	Independent	Moltke III–IV; Bluhme I Ørsted; Bang	
3		Carl Frederik Simony (1806–1872)	15 January 1855	2 December 1859	4 years, 321 days	National Liberal	Bang; Andræ; Hall I	
4		Carl Edvard Rotwitt (1812–1860)	2 December 1859	8 February 1860 #	68 days	Society of the Friends of Peasants	Rotwitt	
–		Johan Christian von Jessen (1817–1884) acting	8 February 1860	24 February 1860	16 days	National Liberal	Rotwitt	
5		Andreas Lorenz Casse (1803–1886)	24 February 1860	11 July 1864	4 years, 138 days	National Liberal	Hall II	

=== Ministers under Christian IX (1863–1906) ===
No.	Portrait	Name (born–died)	Term of office			Political party	Government	Ref.
No.	Portrait	Name (born–died)	Took office	Left office	Time in office	Political party	Government	Ref.
6		Eugenius Sophus Ernst Heltzen (1818–1898)	11 July 1864	13 March 1865	245 days	Højre	Hall II	
7		Cosmus Bræstrup (1789–1870)	7 April 1865	6 November 1865	213 days	Højre	Bluhme II	
8		Carl Peter Gram Leuning (1820–1867)	6 November 1865	21 July 1867 #	1 year, 257 days	National Liberal	Krag-Juel-Vind-Frijs	
9		Theodor Rosenørn-Teilmann (1817–1879)	21 July 1867	17 August 1868	1 year, 27 days	Independent	Krag-Juel-Vind-Frijs	
10		Carl von Nutzhorn (1828–1899)	17 August 1868	28 May 1870	1 year, 284 days	Independent	Krag-Juel-Vind-Frijs	
11		Andreas Frederik Krieger (1817–1893)	28 May 1870	1 July 1872	1 year, 309 days	National Liberal	Holstein-Holsteinborg	
12		Christian Sophus Klein (1824–1900)	1 July 1872	11 June 1875	3 years, 71 days	National Liberal	Holstein-Holsteinborg; Fonnesbech	
13		Johannes Nellemann (1831–1906)	11 June 1875	13 June 1896	21 years, 2 days	Højre	Estrup; Reedtz-Thott	
14		Nicolai Reimer Rump (1834–1900)	13 June 1896	28 August 1899	3 years, 76 days	Højre	Reedtz-Thott; Hørring	
15		Hugo Egmont Hørring (1842–1909)	28 August 1899	27 April 1900	242 days	Højre	Hørring	
16		Carl Goos (1835–1917)	27 April 1900	24 July 1901	1 year, 88 days	Højre	Sehested	
17		Peter Adler Alberti (1851–1932)	24 July 1901	24 July 1908	7 years, 0 days	Venstre Reform	Deuntzer; Christensen I	

=== Ministers under Frederik VIII (1906–1912) ===
No.	Portrait	Name (born–died)	Term of office			Political party	Government	Ref.
No.	Portrait	Name (born–died)	Took office	Left office	Time in office	Political party	Government	Ref.
18		Svend Høgsbro (1855–1910)	24 July 1908	28 October 1909	1 year, 96 days	Venstre Reform Party	Christensen II; Neergaard I Holstein-Ledreborg	
19		Carl Theodor Zahle (1866–1946)	28 October 1909	5 July 1910	250 days	Social Liberal	Zahle I	
20		Frits Bülow (1872–1955)	5 July 1910	21 June 1913	2 years, 351 days	Venstre	Berntsen	

=== Ministers under Christian X (1912–1947) ===
No.	Portrait	Name (born–died)	Term of office			Political party	Government	Ref.
No.	Portrait	Name (born–died)	Took office	Left office	Time in office	Political party	Government	Ref.
(19)		Carl Theodor Zahle (1866–1946)	21 June 1913	30 March 1920	6 years, 283 days	Social Liberal	Zahle II	
21		Otto Liebe (1866–1946)	30 March 1920	2 April 1920	3 days	Independent	Liebe	
22		Kristian Sindballe (1884–1953)	2 April 1920	5 April 1920	3 days	Independent	Liebe	
23		Frederik Carl Gram Schrøder (1866–1936)	5 April 1920	5 May 1920	30 days	Independent	Friis	
24		Svenning Rytter (1875–1957)	5 May 1920	23 April 1924	3 years, 354 days	Venstre	Neergaard II–III	
25		Karl Kristian Steincke (1880–1962)	23 April 1924	14 December 1926	2 years, 235 days	Social Democrats	Stauning I	
(24)		Svenning Rytter (1875–1957)	14 December 1926	30 April 1929	2 years, 137 days	Venstre	Madsen-Mygdal	
(19)		Carl Theodor Zahle (1866–1946)	30 April 1929	4 November 1935	6 years, 188 days	Social Liberal	Stauning II	
(25)		Karl Kristian Steincke (1880–1962)	4 November 1935	15 September 1939	2 years, 235 days	Social Democrats	Stauning III	
26		Svend Unmack Larsen (1893–1965)	15 September 1939	8 July 1940	297 days	Social Democrats	Stauning IV–V	
27		Harald Petersen (1895–1977)	8 July 1940	9 July 1941	1 year, 1 day	Independent	Stauning VI	
28		Eigil Thune Jacobsen (1880–1949)	9 July 1941	29 August 1943	2 years, 51 days	Independent	Stauning VI; Buhl I Scavenius	
No Danish government in between August 29, 1943 and May 5, 1945. Office is assumed by the permanent secretary. (Note: On 29 August 1943, the Danish government resigned, refusing to grant further concessions to Nazi Germany. All government operations were assumed by the permanent secretaries of the individual departments, and this arrangement lasted until the Liberation of Denmark on 5 May 1945. Since King Christian X never accepted the resignation of the government, it existed de jure until a new cabinet was formed on 5 May 1945.)
29		Niels Busch-Jensen (1886–1987)	5 May 1945	7 November 1945	186 days	Social Democrats	Buhl II	
30		Aage Ludvig Holberg Elmquist (1888–1962)	7 November 1945	13 November 1947	2 years, 6 days	Venstre	Kristensen	

=== Ministers under Frederik IX (1947–1972) ===
No.	Portrait	Name (born–died)	Term of office			Political party	Government	Ref.
No.	Portrait	Name (born–died)	Took office	Left office	Time in office	Political party	Government	Ref.
(29)		Niels Busch-Jensen (1886–1987)	13 November 1947	25 February 1950	2 years, 104 days	Social Democrats	Hedtoft I	
–		Vilhelm Buhl (1881–1954) acting	25 February 1950	4 March 1950	7 days	Social Democrats	Hedtoft I	
(25)		Karl Kristian Steincke (1880–1962)	4 March 1950	30 October 1950	240 days	Social Democrats	Hedtoft I–II	
31		Helga Pedersen (1911–1980)	30 October 1950	1 October 1953	2 years, 336 days	Venstre	Eriksen	
32		Hans Erling Hækkerup (1907–1974)	1 October 1953	26 September 1964	10 years, 361 days	Social Democrats	Hedtoft III; Hansen I–II; Kampmann I–II; Krag I	
33		Knud Axel Nielsen (1904–1994)	26 September 1964	2 February 1968	3 years, 129 days	Social Democrats	Krag II	
34		Knud Thestrup (1900–1980)	2 February 1968	11 October 1971	3 years, 251 days	Conservative People's Party	Baunsgaard	
(32)		Knud Axel Nielsen (1904–1994)	11 October 1971	27 September 1973	1 year, 351 days	Social Democrats	Krag III; Jørgensen I	

=== Ministers under Margrethe II (1972–2024) ===
No.	Portrait	Name (born–died)	Term of office			Political party	Government	Ref.
No.	Portrait	Name (born–died)	Took office	Left office	Time in office	Political party	Government	Ref.
35		Karl Hjortnæs (born 1934)	27 September 1973	19 December 1973	83 days	Social Democrats	Jørgensen I	
36		Nathalie Lind (1918–1999)	19 December 1973	13 February 1975	1 year, 56 days	Venstre	Hartling	
37		Orla Møller (1916–1979)	13 February 1975	1 October 1977	2 years, 230 days	Social Democrats	Jørgensen II	
38		Erling Johannes Jensen (1919–2000)	1 October 1977	30 August 1978	333 days	Social Democrats	Jørgensen II	
(36)		Nathalie Lind (1918–1999)	30 August 1978	26 October 1979	1 year, 57 days	Venstre	Jørgensen III	
39		Henning Rasmussen (1926–1997)	26 October 1979	20 January 1981	1 year, 86 days	Social Democrats	Jørgensen IV	
40		Ole Espersen (1934–2020)	20 January 1981	10 September 1982	1 year, 233 days	Social Democrats	Jørgensen IV–V	
41		Erik Ninn-Hansen (1922–2014)	10 September 1982	10 January 1989	6 years, 122 days	Conservative People's Party	Schlüter I–II–III	
42		Hans Peter Clausen (1928–1998)	10 January 1989	5 October 1989	268 days	Conservative People's Party	Schlüter III	
43		Hans Engell (born 1948)	5 October 1989	25 January 1993	3 years, 112 days	Conservative People's Party	Schlüter III–IV	
44		Pia Gjellerup (born 1959)	25 January 1993	29 March 1993	63 days	Social Democrats	P. N. Rasmussen I	
45		Erling Olsen (1927–2011)	29 March 1993	27 September 1994	1 year, 182 days	Social Democrats	P. N. Rasmussen I	
46		Bjørn Westh (born 1944)	27 September 1994	30 December 1996	2 years, 94 days	Social Democrats	P. N. Rasmussen II	
47		Frank Jensen (born 1961)	30 December 1996	27 November 2001	4 years, 332 days	Social Democrats	P. N. Rasmussen III–IV	
48		Lene Espersen (born 1965)	27 November 2001	10 September 2008	6 years, 288 days	Conservative People's Party	A. F. Rasmussen I–II–III	
49		Brian Mikkelsen (born 1966)	10 September 2008	23 February 2010	1 year, 166 days	Conservative People's Party	A. F. Rasmussen III; L. L. Rasmussen I	
50		Lars Barfoed (born 1957)	23 February 2010	3 October 2011	1 year, 166 days	Conservative People's Party	L. L. Rasmussen I	
51		Morten Bødskov (born 1970)	3 October 2011	12 December 2013	2 years, 70 days	Social Democrats	Thorning-Schmidt I	
52		Karen Hækkerup (born 1974)	12 December 2013	10 October 2014	302 days	Social Democrats	Thorning-Schmidt I–II	
53		Mette Frederiksen (born 1977)	10 October 2014	28 June 2015	251 days	Social Democrats	Thorning-Schmidt II	
54		Søren Pind (born 1969)	28 June 2015	28 November 2016	1 year, 153 days	Venstre	L. L. Rasmussen II	
55		Søren Pape Poulsen (1971–2024)	28 November 2016	27 June 2019	2 years, 211 days	Conservative People's Party	L. L. Rasmussen III	
56		Nick Hækkerup (born 1968)	27 June 2019	2 May 2022	2 years, 309 days	Social Democrats	Frederiksen I	
57		Mattias Tesfaye (born 1981)	2 May 2022	15 December 2022	227 days	Social Democrats	Frederiksen I	
58		Peter Hummelgaard (born 1983)	15 December 2022	3 June 2026	3 years, 170 days	Social Democrats	Frederiksen II	

=== Ministers under Frederik X (2024–present) ===
No.	Portrait	Name (born–died)	Term of office			Political party	Government	Ref.
No.	Portrait	Name (born–died)	Took office	Left office	Time in office	Political party	Government	Ref.
59		Nicolai Wammen (born 1971)	3 June 2026	Incumbent	109 days	Social Democrats	Frederiksen III	

- According to the data provided above, Helga Pedersen was the first female to serve as the Minister of Justice in Denmark.

== See also ==
- Cabinet of Denmark
