= August Hermann Ferdinand Carl Goos =

Danish politician

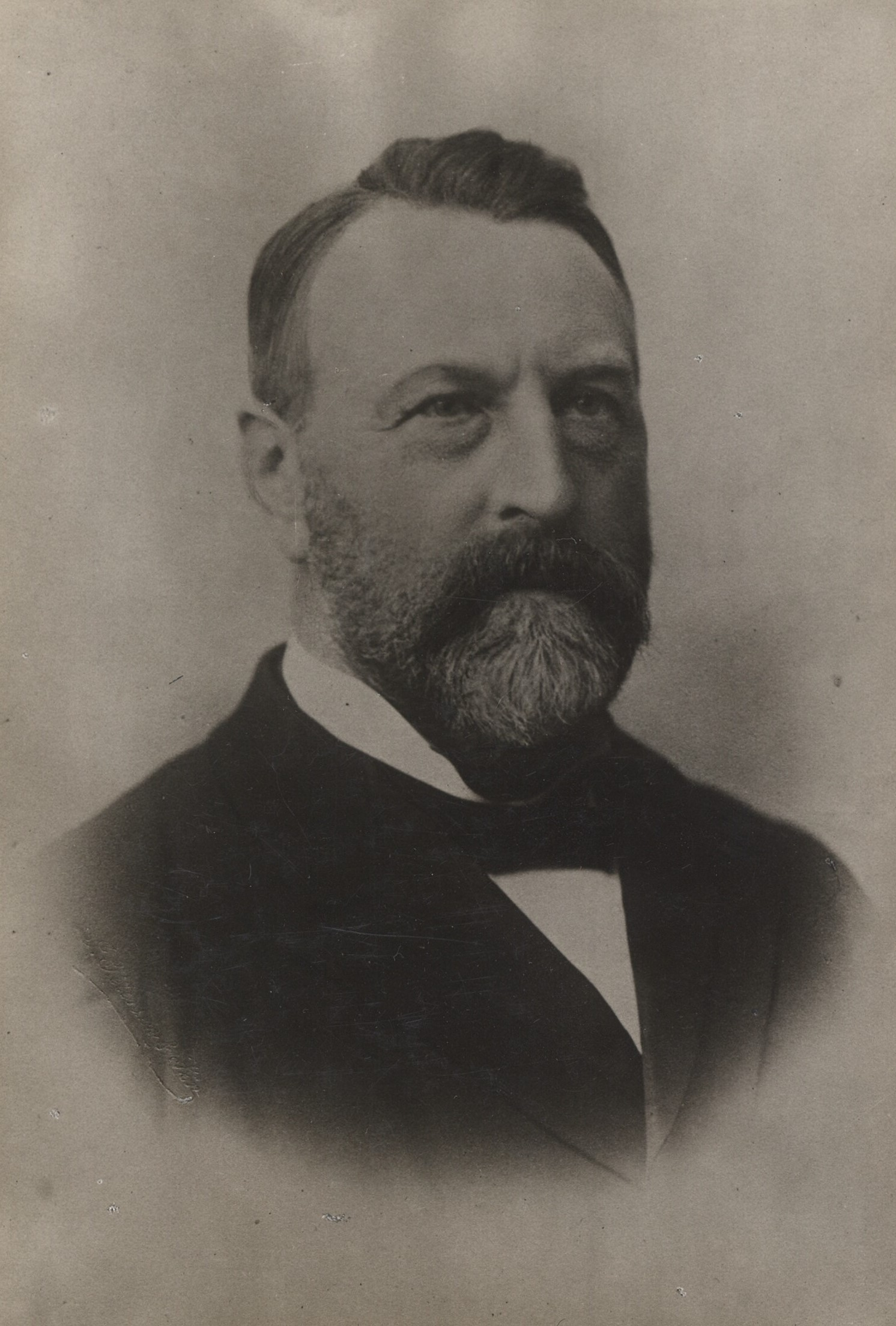
- August Hermann Ferdinand Carl Goos
- Born: 3 January 1835; Rønne, Denmark
- Died: 20 December 1917 (aged 82); Copenhagen, Denmark
- Occupations: politician, jurist
- Years active: 1857-present
- Spouse: Amalie Henriette Irminger

August Hermann Ferdinand Carl Goos (3 January 1835 – 20 December 1917) was a Danish politician, a member of the Højre political party. He was Kultus Minister from 1891 to 1894, Minister of Justice from 1900 to 1901, and Minister for Iceland from 1900 to 1901.

== Biography ==
Goos was born on 3 January 1835 in Rønne. He studied law at the University of Copenhagen, becoming a Professor of Law in 1862. He also served as a rector at the university in 1879. In 1880, Goos was elected by a Copenhagen circle in the Folketing, but in 1884 had to give way to a Social Democratic leader. In 1885, however, he became a royally elected member of the County Council.

In July 1891, Goos was appointed Kultus Minister, resigning in 1894. He later served as Minister of Justice from 1900 to 1901, as well as Minister for Iceland.

Goos died in Copenhagen in 1917. He is buried at the Vestre Cemetery.

Political offices
Preceded by Hugo Egmont Hørring	Justice Minister of Denmark; 27 April 1900 – 24 July 1901	Succeeded by Peter Adler Alberti
