= Peter Adler Alberti =

Danish politician and swindler (1851–1932)

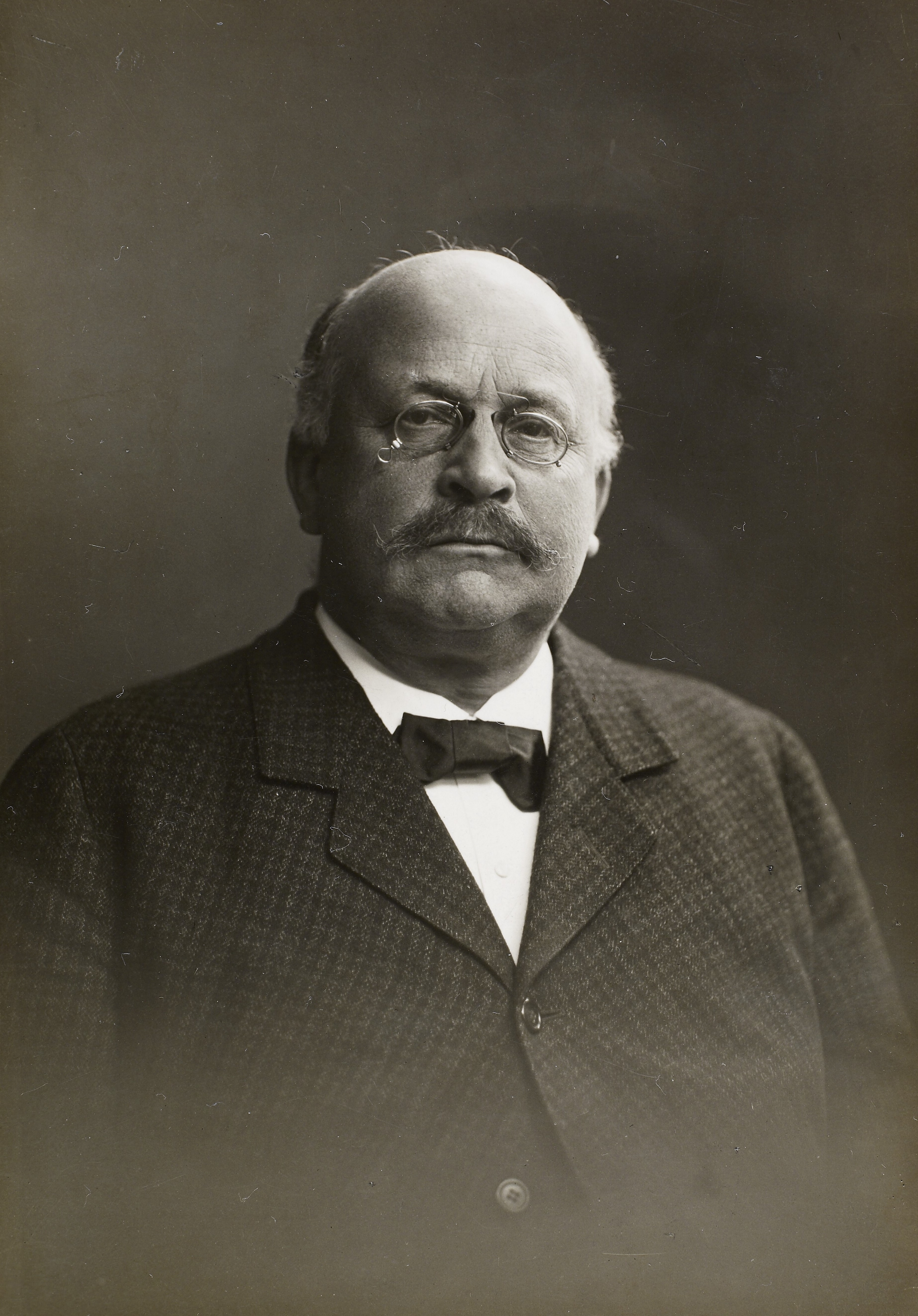
- Born: 10 June 1851; Copenhagen
- Died: 14 June 1932 (aged 81); Rigshospitalet's dept. C, Copenhagen
- Resting place: Assistens Cemetery, Copenhagen
- Known for: the Alberti scandal of 1908
- Title: Justice Minister of Denmark
- Term: 1901 - 1908
- Predecessor: August Goos
- Successor: Svend Høgsbro
- Political party: Venstre Reform Party; Venstre
- Criminal charge: embezzlement
- Criminal penalty: 8 years
- Spouses: Eugenia née Møller; Anna Victoria Bendix née Sundberg

Peter Adler Alberti (10 June 1851 – 14 June 1932) was a Danish politician and swindler, known for the Alberti scandal of 1908.

== Career ==
Alberti was a solicitor, the son of a liberal politician who had been a pioneer of the Danish savings bank system. The family background led to his own career as the leader of Den sjællandske Bondestands Sparekasse from 1890 but very early he was also involved in speculations and doubtful economic transactions partly due to his ludomania. Later on, it has become clear that he had been guilty of severe embezzlement from a very early stage. Perhaps in order to neutralise further attacks, he entered politics in 1892 representing the right wing of the liberal movement. However, he joined the united Venstre Reform Party in 1895, making himself the right hand of J. C. Christensen.

From 1901 to 1908, Alberti was the first Venstre justice minister. During this period he was subjected to harder and harder accusations of economic dishonesty by Social Liberals and Social Democrats. Prime minister Christensen ignored the critics as long as possible, but in the end had to ask Alberti to resign. A few months later, on 8 September 1908, Alberti turned himself in to the police for embezzlement of 18 million DKK (1.1 billion DKK as of 2013). He was sentenced to 8 years in 'tugthus' (imprisonment at hard labor) and was imprisoned from 1912 to 1917. After his release he worked as a clerk.

The scandal echoed over all of Europe and also involved Alberti's British business partners. In Denmark, it led to the fall of the Christensen cabinet and for some years it poisoned the political atmosphere in Denmark. It is therefore still considered one of the most serious swindles of modern Danish history.

Political offices
Preceded by August Goos	Justice Minister of Denmark; 24 July 1901 – 24 July 1908	Succeeded by Svend Høgsbro
