= Nicolai Reimer Rump =

Danish politician (1834–1900)

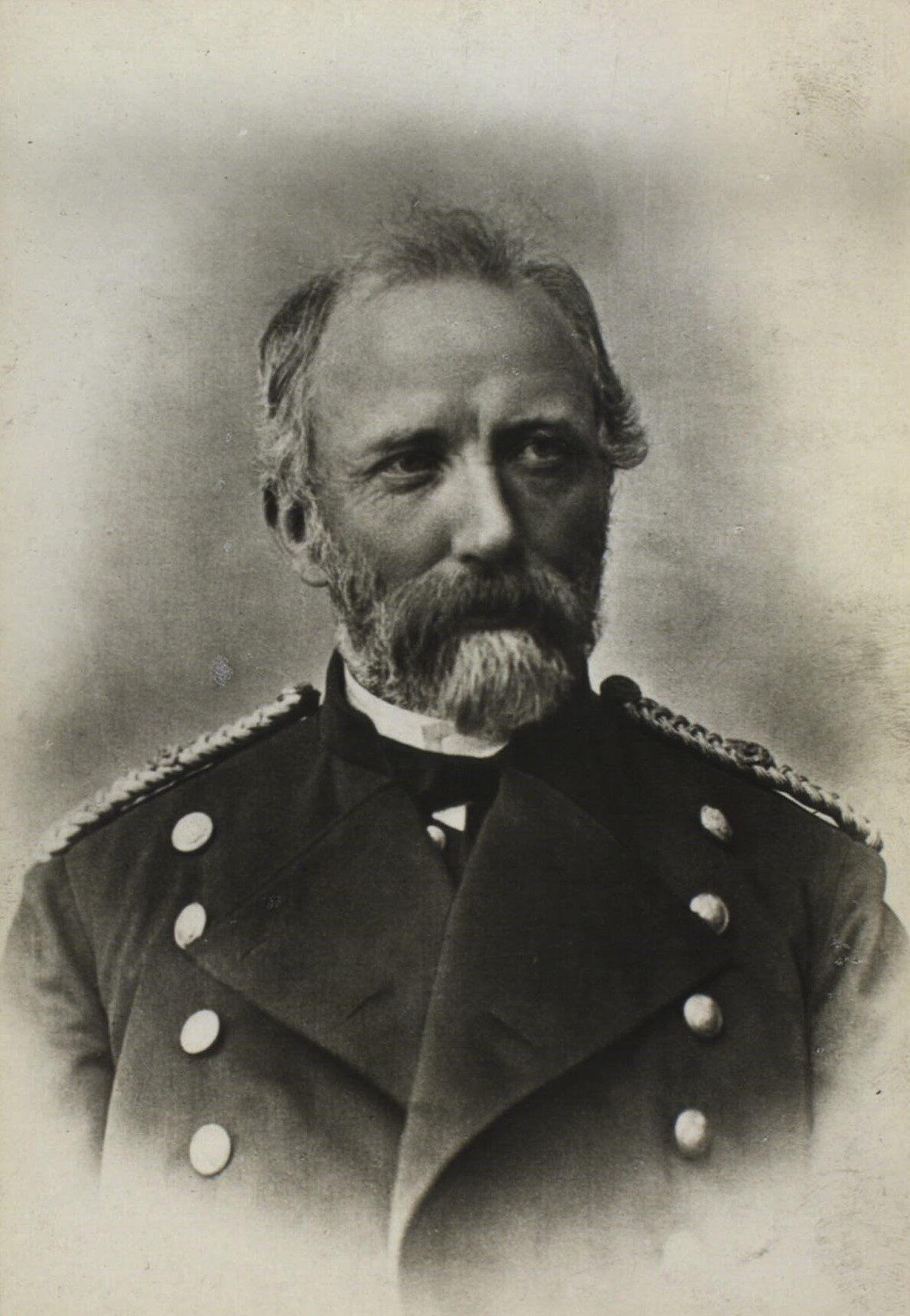
- Rump in an undated picture.

Minister of Justice
- In office 13 June 1896 – 28 August 1899
- Prime Minister: Tage Reedtz-Thott; Hugo Egmont Hørring
- Preceded by: Johannes Nellemann
- Succeeded by: Hugo Egmont Hørring

Minister for Iceland
- In office 13 June 1896 – 28 August 1899
- Prime Minister: Tage Reedtz-Thott; Hugo Egmont Hørring
- Preceded by: Johannes Nellemann
- Succeeded by: Hugo Egmont Hørring

Personal details
- Born: 26 June 1834 Hillerød, Denmark
- Died: 16 August 1900 (age 66) Vallø, Denmark
- Party: Højre
- Education: Frederiksborg Latin School

Nicolai Reimer Rump (26 June 1834 – 16 August 1900) was a Danish politician who served as Minister of Justice from 1896 to 1899.

== Early life ==
Rump was born in Hillerød, Denmark, on 26 June 1834 to Carl David Rump (1785–1857) and Cathrine Jørgensen (1797–1874). He was the younger brother of Danish painter Godtfred Rump. Rump studied Law in Frederiksborg and following his graduation in 1859, he was employed at the Schleswig ministry until the Duchy was annexed following the Second Schleswig War in 1864. Rump married Helene Sophie Olrik (1830–1899) on 24 October 1860 and the couple went on to have a son Johannes Rump the following year.

== Career ==
Rump went on to work as a magistrate on the Faroe Islands from 1866 to 1871, when he was transferred to the town clerk's office in Korsør. In 1878, Rump was elected as a member of the Landstinget. He served in that position until he was appointed as the county commissioner of Hjørring County in 1887. In 1894, Rump was appointed as one of the king's Landstinget members and served as the chairman of the commission on the pharmacy system.

When Johannes Nellemann resigned from the Reedtz-Thott cabinet as Minister of Justice and Minister for Iceland on 13 June 1896, Rump was named his successor. Rump would serve in those posts until his resignation on 28 August 1899. Following his tenure as Minister, Rimp was appointed county commissioner of Holbæk County, but resigned the post on 1 August 1900 due to ill health.

== Later life ==
Rump died on 16 August 1900 in Vallø, Denmark, aged 66, and was buried in Vestre Cemetery in Copenhagen.

== National honours ==
- 1898: Commander 1st Class of the Order of the Dannebrog
- 1900: Grand Cross of the Order of the Dannebrog
