= Hugo Egmont Hørring =

Danish politician (1842–1909)

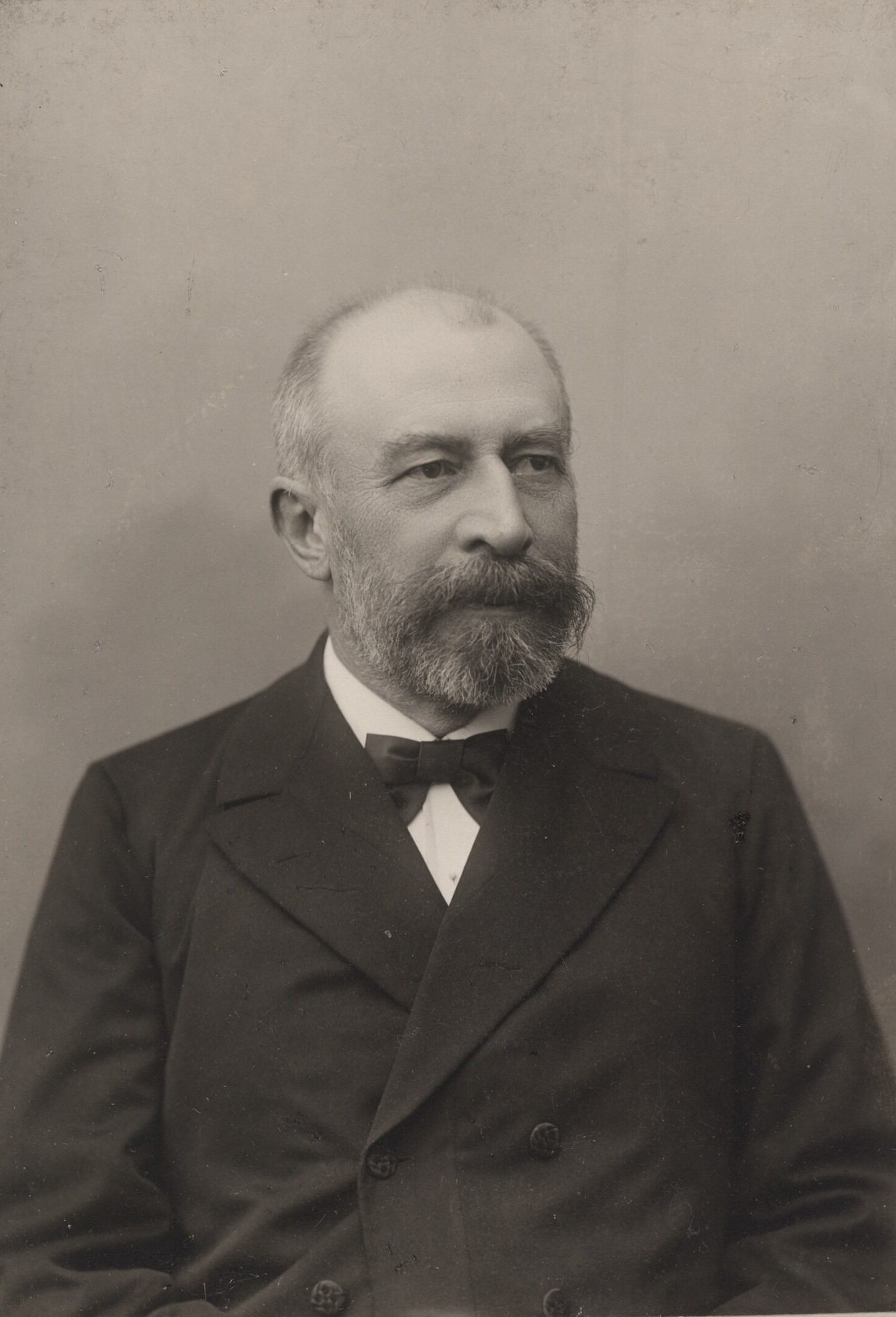

Council President of Denmark
- In office 23 May 1897 – 27 April 1900
- Monarch: Christian IX
- Preceded by: Tage Reedtz-Thott
- Succeeded by: Hannibal Sehested

Personal details
- Born: 17 August 1842 Copenhagen
- Died: 13 February 1909 (aged 66) Copenhagen
- Party: Højre
- Education: University of Copenhagen

Hugo Egmont Hørring (17 August 1842 – 13 February 1909) was a Danish politician, a member of the Højre political party. He was Council President of Denmark from 1897 to 1900 as the leader of the Cabinet of Hørring.

== Biography ==
Hørring was born in Copenhagen, Denmark. He became a student in 1860 at Borgerdydskolen in Christianshavn and received a cand.jur. degree from the University of Copenhagen in 1868. He held various positions in the Ministry of the Interior and in 1882 became director of the Royal Greenland Trading Department (Den Kongelige Grønlandske Handel).

Hørring retired from government service in April 1900. He was a Grand Cross Knight of the Order of the Dannebrog and Dannebrogsman. Hørring died in Copenhagen during 1909 and was buried in Garrison Cemetery.

Political offices
Preceded by Hans Peter Ingerslev	Interior Minister of Denmark; 15 January 1894 – 23 May 1897	Succeeded by Vilhelm Bardenfleth
Preceded by Tage Reedtz-Thott	Council President of Denmark; 23 May 1897 – 27 April 1900	Succeeded by Hannibal Sehested
Preceded by Christian Lüttichau	Finance Minister of Denmark; 23 May 1897 – 27 April 1900	Succeeded by William Scharling
Preceded by Nicolai Reimer Rump	Justice Minister of Denmark; 28 August 1899 – 27 April 1900	Succeeded by August Hermann Ferdinand Carl Goos
