= Johannes Nellemann =

Danish lawyer and politician (1831–1906)

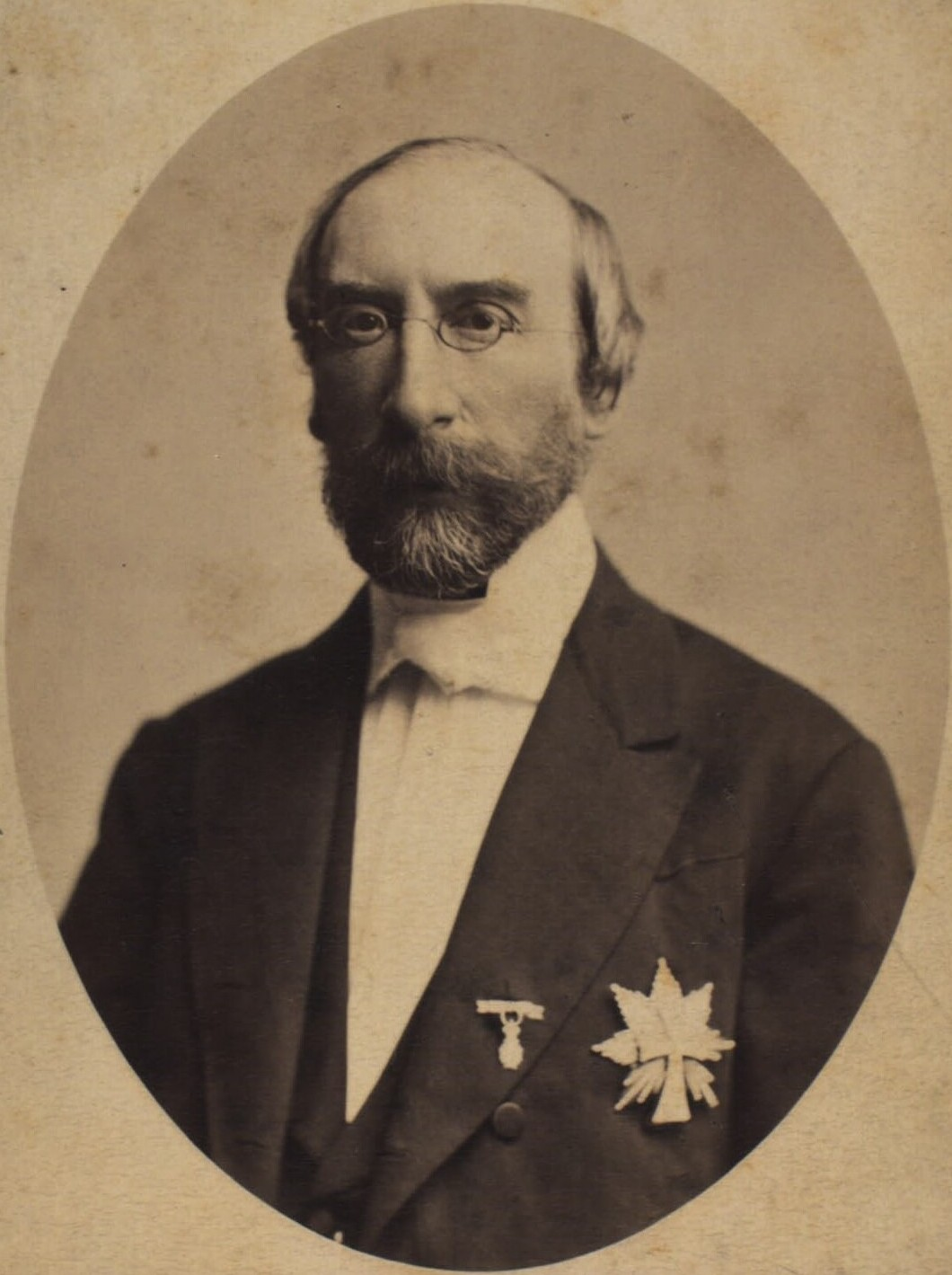
- Nellemann
- Born: 1 November 1831; Copenhagen, Denmark
- Died: 26 August 1906 (aged 74); Copenhagen, Denmark
- Occupation: Politician
- Years active: 1855-1906

Johannes Magnus Valdemar Nellemann (1 November 1831 – 26 August 1906) was a Danish lawyer and politician, a member of the Højre political party. He was Minister of Justice and Minister for Iceland from 1875 to 1896.

== Biography ==
Nellemann graduated from the University of Copenhagen in 1849, He served as rector at the university between 1874 and 1875.

He was a member of the Landstinget from 1870, serving as Minister of Justice and Minister for Iceland from 1875 to 1896.

He was a member of the Royal Danish Academy of Sciences and Letters from 1883 and became Grand Cross of the Order of the Dannebrog in 1878 and Knight of the Order of the Elephant in 1893. In 1896 he was appointed Governor of the National Bank.

He died on 26 August 1906, and is buried at the Assistens Cemetery.

Political offices
Preceded by Christian Sophus Klein	Justice Minister of Denmark; 11 June 1875 – 13 June 1896	Succeeded by Nicolai Reimer Rump
