= Minister for Iceland =

Former Danish cabinet post

- Ráðherra Íslands
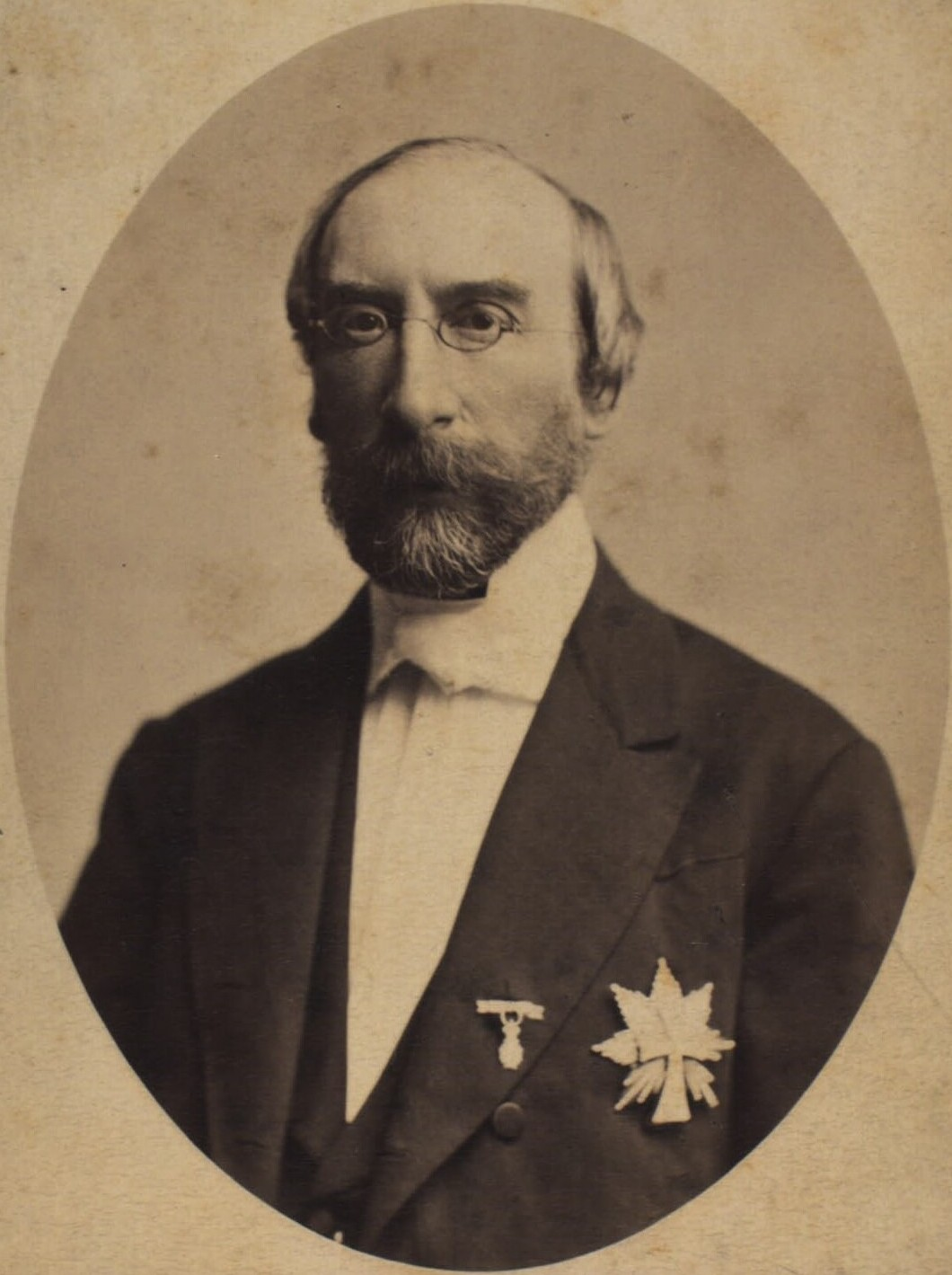
- Longest serving Johannes Nellemann; 11 June 1875–13 June 1896
- Before 1904: Ministry of Justice of Denmark
- Member of: Cabinet of Denmark (before 1904); Cabinet of Denmark; Cabinet of Iceland (after 1904)
- Seat: Copenhagen (before 1904); Reykjavík (after 1904)
- Appointer: Monarch of Denmark
- Constituting instrument: Constitution of Denmark (before 1904); Constitution of Iceland (after 1904)
- Precursor: Justice Minister of Denmark
- Formation: 5 January 1874; 152 years ago (Denmark); 1 February 1904; 122 years ago (Iceland)
- First holder: Christian Sophus Klein (Denmark); Hannes Hafstein (Iceland)
- Final holder: Peter Adler Alberti (Denmark); Jón Magnússon (Iceland)
- Abolished: 1 February 1904; 122 years ago (Denmark); 30 November 1918; 107 years ago (Iceland)
- Succession: Prime Minister of Iceland

Minister for Iceland (Danish: Minister for Island, pronounced [miˈnistɐ fɒ ˈisˌlænˀ]; Icelandic: Ráðherra Íslands) was a post in the Danish cabinet for Icelandic affairs.

== History ==
The post was established on 5 January 1874 as, according to the Constitution of Iceland, the executive power rested in the king of Denmark through the Danish cabinet. The Constitutional Act of Iceland of 3 October 1903 stated that the minister for Iceland had to be a resident of Reykjavík and be able to read and write Icelandic. The minister was responsible to the Icelandic parliament. The post of Minister for Iceland was part of the post of Justice Minister of Denmark until 1904 when Iceland obtained extended home rule.

After an agreement with the Social Liberal government in Copenhagen in January 1917, Jón Magnússon formed the first coalition government consisting of three ministers and with a majority in the Althing behind it. Parliamentarism was thus implemented in Iceland. Jón Magnússon got the title forsætisráðherra Íslands (Prime Minister of Iceland, but literally chairman or president of the ministers), while all three ministers were also formally members of the Danish cabinet each with the title Minister of Iceland.

In 1918, the Danish–Icelandic Act of Union recognised Iceland as an independent and sovereign state in a personal union with Denmark. The Kingdom of Iceland was established and the post of Minister for Iceland was closed down on 30 November 1918.

== List of ministers ==
=== Constitution (1874–1904) ===
No.	Portrait	Name (born-died)	Term of office			Political party	Government	Ref.
No.	Portrait	Name (born-died)	Took office	Left office	Time in office	Political party	Government	Ref.
1		Christian Sophus Klein (1824–1900)	1 August 1874	11 June 1875	314 days	National Liberal Party	Fonnesbech	
2		Johannes Nellemann (1831–1906)	11 June 1875	13 June 1896	21 years, 2 days	Højre	Estrup; Reedtz-Thott	
3		Nicolai Reimer Rump (1834–1900)	13 June 1896	28 August 1899	3 years, 76 days	Højre	Reedtz-Thott; Hørring	
4		Hugo Egmont Hørring (1842–1909)	28 August 1899	27 April 1900	242 days	Højre	Hørring	
5		Peter Adler Alberti (1851–1932)	24 July 1901	1 February 1904	2 years, 192 days	Venstre Reform Party	Deuntzer	

=== Home Rule (1904–1918) ===
No.	Portrait	Name (born-died)	Term of office			Political party	Government	Ref.
No.	Portrait	Name (born-died)	Took office	Left office	Time in office	Political party	Government	Ref.
6		Hannes Hafstein (1861–1922); MP for Eyjafjarðarsýsla	1 February 1904	31 March 1909	5 years, 58 days	Home Rule Party	Deuntzer; Christensen I–II; Neergaard I	
7		Björn Jónsson (1846–1912); MP for Barðastrandarsýsla	31 March 1909	14 March 1911	1 year, 348 days	Independence Party	Neergaard I Holstein-Ledreborg; Zahle I Berntsen	
8		Kristján Jónsson (1852–1926); MP for Borgarfjarðarsýsla	14 March 1911	25 July 1912	1 year, 133 days	Independent	Berntsen	
6		Hannes Hafstein (1861–1922); MP for Eyjafjarðarsýsla	25 July 1912	21 July 1914	1 year, 361 days	Union Party	Berntsen; Zahle II	
9		Sigurður Eggerz (1875–1945); MP for West Skaftafellssýsla	21 July 1914	4 May 1915	287 days	Independence Party	Zahle II	
10		Einar Arnórsson (1880–1955); MP for Árnessýsla	4 May 1915	4 January 1917	1 year, 245 days	Independence Party – Langsum	Zahle II	
11		Jón Magnússon (1859–1926); MP for Reykjavík until 1920 not in Parliament from 1920	4 January 1917	30 November 1918	1 year, 330 days	Home Rule Party	Zahle II	
11		Sigurður Jónsson (1852–1926)	4 January 1917	30 November 1918	1 year, 330 days	Progressive Party	Zahle II	
11		Björn Kristjansson (1859–1926)	4 January 1917	28 August 1917	236 days	Independence Party	Zahle II	
11		Sigurður Eggerz (1875–1945); MP without constituency	28 August 1917	30 November 1918	1 year, 94 days	Independence Party	Zahle II	

== See also ==
- Prime Minister of Iceland
