= 1818 in Denmark =

- Decades: 1790s; 1800s; 1810s; 1820s; 1830s
- See also: Other events of 1818; List of years in Denmark

Events from the year 1818 in Denmark.

== Incumbents ==
- Monarch – Frederick VI
- Prime minister – Joachim Godske Moltke

== Events ==
- 26 May – The County of Lerchenborg is established by Christian Cornelius Lerche from the manors of Lerchenborg and Aunsøgård as well as the farms Mineslund, Asnæsgård, Lerchenfeld, Birkendegård, Vesterbygard, Astrup and Davrup.

== Births ==
- 3 February – Anton Melbye, marine painter and daguerreotype photographer (died 1875)
- 8 February – Carl Frederik Sørensen, marine painter (died 1879)
- 10 March – Johan Vilhelm Gertner, portrait painter (died 1871)
- 27 June – Hans Vilhelm Kaalund, poet (died 1885)
- 13 August – Johan Daniel Herholdt, architect (died 1902)
- 1 September – Johan Lundbye, painter (died 1848)
- 17 September – Louise Sahlgreenm actress (died 1891)

== Undated ==
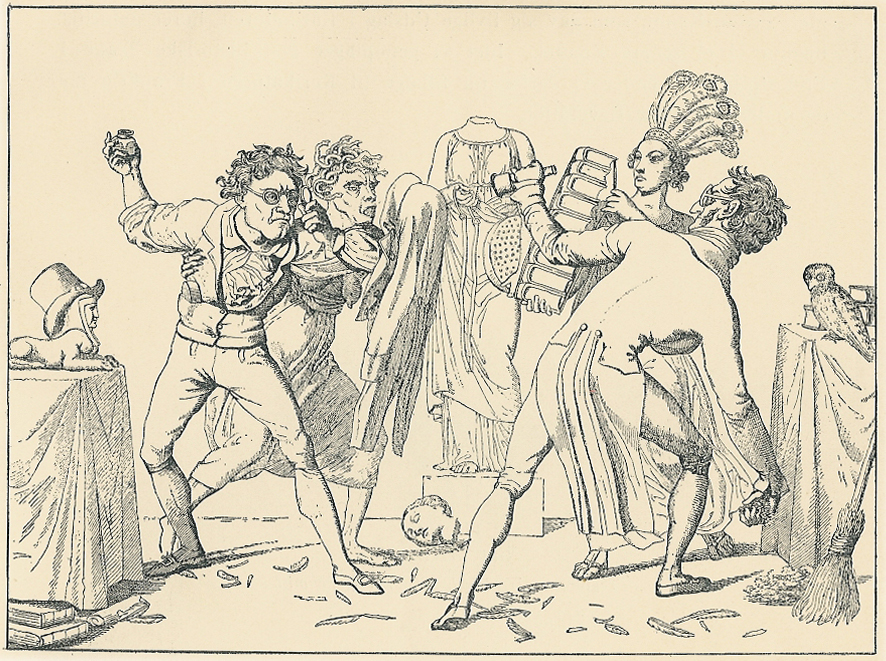
Pennefejden: Caricature by C. W. Eckersberg.

- Pennefejden: A bitter literary feud between Jens Baggesen and Adam Oehlenschläger.

== Deaths ==
- 11 February – Hans Nansen, painter /born 1765)
- 25 March – Caspar Wessel, mathematician (born 1745)
- 25 April – Johan Martin Quist, architect (born 1755)
