= Birkendegård =

Danish manor house

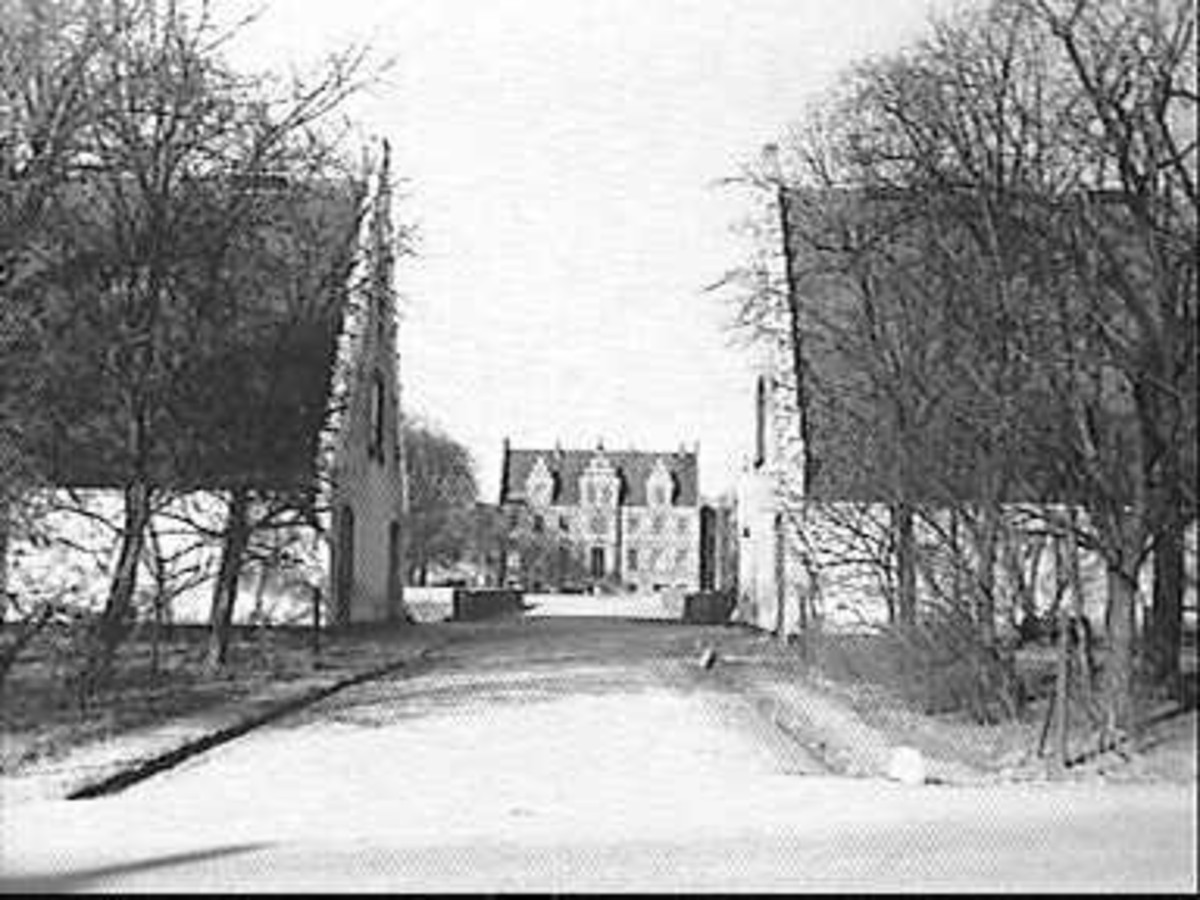
- Interactive map of the Birkendegård area

General information
- Architectural style: Neoclassical
- Location: Holbækvej 187; 4400 Kalundborg, Denmark
- Coordinates: 55°40′25.5″N 11°12′26″E
- Completed: 1854 (current main building)

Birkendegård is a manor house and estate located 6 km east of Kalundborg. The two-storey, Renaissance Revival style main building is from 1954 and was designed by Christian Tybjerg.

== History ==
=== Early history ===
The name is first recorded as Byrchinge in 1663 when it was a under Roskiulde Bishopric. The name is later recorded as Birkingegaard. The current name is most likely a corruption of the original name. At the Reformation in 1536, Birkendegård was confiscated by the crown along with all other property of the Catholic church. Due to its small size, it was placed under Kalundborg Castle.

In 1672, Birkendegård was granted to Jørgen Bielke as compensation for his losses during the Second Northern War. In 1674, he was granted permission to dissolve the village and replace it by a single manor. This process was however not completed until 1700. Bielke's other holdings included nearby Avnsøgård and Edelgave north of Copenhagen.

In 1686, Birkendegård was acquired by Jørgen Hansen. After his widow's death, it returned to the crown. In 1693, it was ceded to Jørgen Bielke's daughter, Sophie Amalie Bielke, his only surviving child, in return for her giving up all her father's pending demands against the crown.

In 1700, Sophie Amalie Bielke sold Birkendegård to Johan Christopher Schönbach. He served as county governor of Kalundborg, Sæbygård, Drahsholm counties. From 1707, he also served as county governor of Holbæk. On his second wife's death, their heirs /two sons and a daughter) unsuccessfully tried to sell the estate in three different auctions. The estate was reventually sold to Terkel Terkelsen.

=== Lerche family ===
In 1743, Birkendegård was acquired by Christian Lerche. He became one of the largest landowners in the country. In 1755, he was granted permission to turn his holdings into a stamhus with the effect that they could not be divided between heirs, sold or pledged. Christian Lerche died in 1757, His widow kept the estate until her death. When their grandson, Christian Cornelius Lerche, who had inherited Lerchenborg in 1804, was ennobled with rank of count, on 26 May 1818, Birkendegård was combined with Lerchenborg and a number of other estates to form the Countship of Lerchenborg (Grevskabet Lerchenborg). Prior to his death in 1952, Christian Cornelius Lerche had applied for dissolution of the stamhus. All land that was not part of the countship was therefore divided between his four sons. Birkendegård was passed down to his son Vilhelm Cornelius Magnus Lerche. He was succeeded by his own son, Gustav Lerche, who was an estimated farmer.

=== Faye family ===
In 1921, Birkendegård was acquired by two brothers named Jacobsen. Later that same they sold it to Aage Faye. He was the son of Gerhard Faye, a pioneer of the sugar beet industry on Lolland-Falster, whom he had succeeded as manager of Nakskov Sugar Factory. Birkendegård was after his death passed to his eldest son Gerhard Faye and then to his grandson Jørgen Faye.

== Architecture ==
The current main building was constructed in 1854 to designs by Christian Yubjerg. It has stepped gables and dormers.

== List of owners ==
- ( -1536) Roskilde Bispestol
- (1536-1672) Kronen
- (1672- ) Jørgen Bielke
- (1686) Jørgen Hansen
- ( -1693) Kronen
- (1693- ) Sophie Amalie Bielke, gift Hvalsøe
- ( -1700) Hans Hansen Hvalsøe
- (1700-1726) Johan Christopher Schönbach
- (1726-1732) Anna Elisabeth von Korff, gift von Schønbach
- (1732-1733) Hans Friderich von Schønbach
- (1732-1733) Susanne Lovise von Schønbach
- (1732-1735) Johan Christopher von Schønbach
- (1735-1743) Terkel Terkelsen
- (1743-1757) Christian Lerche
- (1757-1766) Amalie Margrethe Christiane Caroline Leiningen Westerburg, gift Lerche
- (1766-1798) Georg Flemming Lerche
- (1798-1852) Christian Cornelius Lerche
- (1852-1853) Estate of Christian Cornelius Lerche
- (1853-1895) Vilhelm Cornelius Magnus Lerche
- (1895-1921) Gustav Lerche
- (1921) Jacobsen brothers
- (1921-1949) Aage Faye
- (1949-1999) Gerhard Faye
- (1999- ) Jørgen Faye
