= Holbæk County =

Holbæk County (Danish: Holbæk Amt) is a former Danish county on Zealand.

== History ==
Holbæk County was established in 1662 as a replacement of the old Holbæk Fief (Holbæk Len). It consisted of two hundreds, Merløse (without Orø, which belonged to Jægerspris County) and Tuse. At the 1793 Danish County Reform, Kalundborg County, Dragsholm County and Sæbygård were merged into Holbæk County. In 1970, Holbæk County was merged with Sorø County to form West Zealand County (Vestsjællands Amt).

== List of county governors ==
The governors of Holbæk county from 1657 until its dissolution in 1970 were:

Portrait	Name	Term
	Erik Ottesen Banner	1657–1661
	Henrik Thott	1661–1662
	Henning Pogwisch	1662–1664
	Jørgen Bjelke	1671–1696
	Tage Thott	1683–1707
	Johan Christopher Schönbach	1707–1727
	Frederik Adeler	1707–1727
	Joachim Hartvig Johan von Barner	1751–1768
	Eiler Christopher Ahlefeldt	1768–1770
	Carl Adolph Rantzau	1770–1771
	Bartholomæus Bertelsen (de Cederfeld)	1771–1781 (Note: Continued as county governor of Kalundborg, Sæbygaard and Dragsjolm counties until 1783.)
	Michael Herman Løvenskiold	1781–1804
	Frederik Adeler	1804–1808
	Christian Cornelius Lerche	1808–1810
	Herman Løvenskiold	1810–1815
	Julius Knuth	1815–1831
	Mathias Vilhelm Moltke	1831–1848
	Peter Georg Bang	1848–1849
	Christian Pløyen	1849–1867
	J. Christian Bille-Brahe	1867–1873
	Carl Ludvig Adolph von Benzon	1873–1886
	Carl Steen Andersen Bille	1886–1898
	Nicolai Reimer Rump	1899–1900
	Vilhelm Peter Schulin	1900–1906
	Emil Ammentorp	1906–1915
	Poul Christen Saxild	1916–1942
	Henrik de Jonquières	1942–1960
	Mogens Julius Clausen	1960–1970

== See also ==
- List of county governors of Vordingborg
