= Christian Cornelius Lerche =

Danish landowner and county governor (1770–1852)

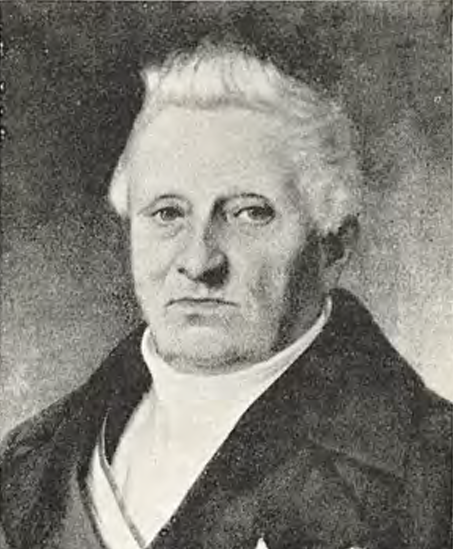
Christian Cornelius Lerche

Christian Cornelius Lerche til Lerchenborg (1770–1852) was a Danish landowner and county governor of Holbæk County. On 26 May 1818, he was elevated to lensgreve as Count Lerche-Lerchenborg.

== Early life and education ==
Lerche was born on 2 September 1770, the son of Geheimeraad Georg Flemming Lerche and Hedvig Cathrine von Krogh. His great-great-grandfather Cornelius Pedersen Lerche was ennobled in 1660. Lerche earned a law degree from the University of Copenhagen in 1789.

== Career ==
Lerche started his career as an assistant (Auskultant) in Kammerkollegiet. On 12 July 1802, he was awarded the title of chamberlain (hammerherre). From 7 December 1808 to 23 November 1810, he served as county governor of Holbæk County.

In 1832, he was appointed to the Assembly of 35 Enlightened Men ("de 35 oplyste Mænds Forsamling"). He was subsequently a member of Roskilde Constituent Assembly (the Stænderforsamlinger for Østifterne) from 1835 to 1846, elected by the estate owners on Zealand.

== Property and titles ==
Lerche succeeded his father to stamhuset Lerchenborg in 1798. In 1804, its status of an entailed property was substituted with a bonded capital. His other holdings included Vesterbygaard (1804–1843) and Sæbygaard (1829–1837). In 1843, Vesterbygaard was sold to Christen Andreas Fonnesbech.

In 1817, he was created a Knight of the order of the Dannebrog. On 26 May 1818, he was elevated to lensgreve. In 1836, he was awarded the Cross of Honour. In 1840, he was created a Commander of the Order of the Dannebrog. In 1846, he was awarded the Grand Cross.

== Personal life ==
Lerche married Ulrikke Sophie von Levetzau on 26 June 1790. She was a daughter of Geheimeraad Heinrich Levetzau and Frederikke Louise Schaffalitzky de Muckadell. They had four children: Christian Albrecht Lerche-Lerchenborg, Louise Frederikke Lerche, Cornelia Sophie von Krogh, and Henriette Wilhelmina Von Tillisch. She died on 3 February 1803. He married again on 3 October 1807 to Wilhelmine Dorthea von Krogh. She was the daughter of Geheimeraad Fredrik Ferdinand von Krogh and Rosina Elisabeth von Fran kenberg u. Proschlitz. Christian had another nine children with Wilhelmine.

Lerche died on 26 April 1852 at Lerchenborg. He is buried at Årby Cemetery.

Civic offices
Preceded by Frederik Adeler	County Governor of Holbæk County; 1808—1810	Succeeded by Herman Løvenskiold
