= Falkenskiold (noble family) =

Noble family

- Noble family
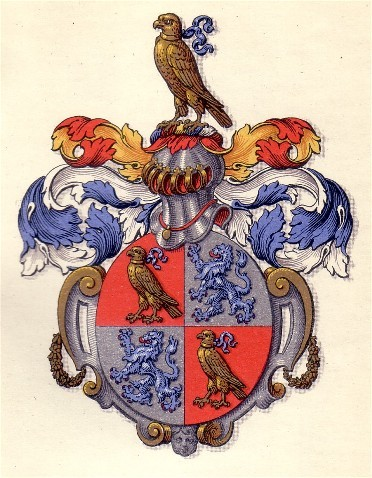
- Parent family: Düssel family
- Country: Denmark; Norway
- Founded: 3 August 1716
- Founder: Martin Düssel and Christoffer Düssel
- Historic seat: Sophienberg Castle
- Motto: Sanguis Auro Dignior.
- Estates: Sæbygård Estate; Falkenhøj Estate

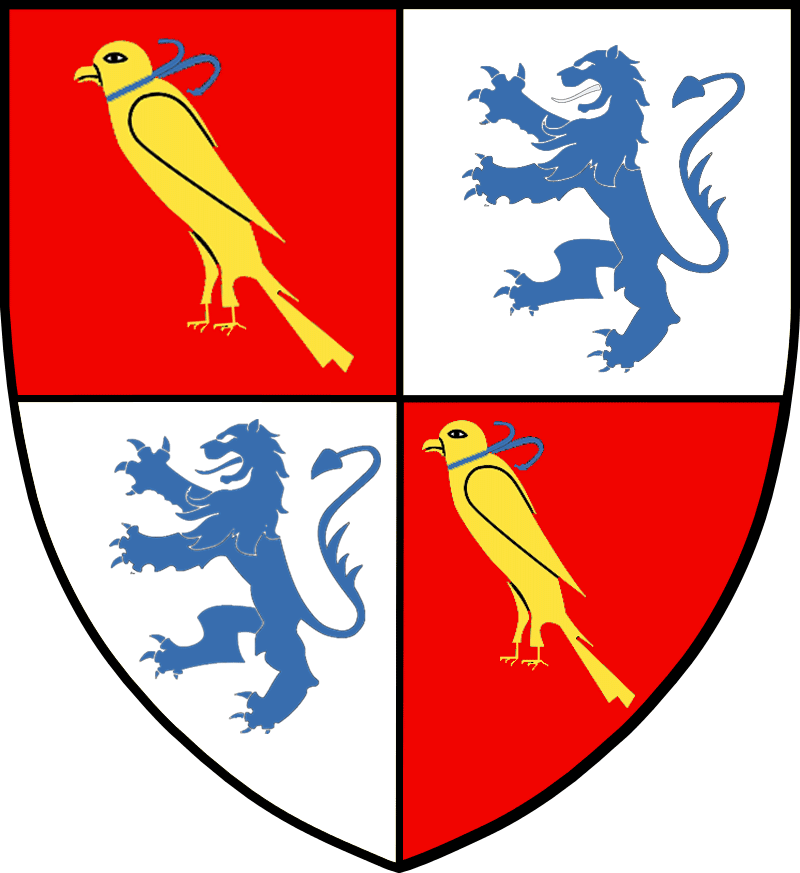

The Falkenskiold family was a Danish and Norwegian noble family of high nobility that descended from a medieval Danish patrician family the Düssel (Dyssel) family who were members of the Rigsrådet.

== History ==
The Falkenskiold family descended from State Councillor and County Governor Arnold Christian Düssel (ca. 1650–1714) of the influential burgher Düssel (Dyssel) family, he owned Sejlstrupgård Estate. His sons, Martin Düssel (ca. 1690–1746) and Christoffer Düssel (ca. 1698–1770) were both by letters patent on 3 August 1716 ennobled as højere brevadel (New Nobility of the Higher Part) and Sværadlen (Sword Nobility) under the name von Falkenskiold (‘of Falcons Shield').

The family went extinct with the deaths of its two last male members, brothers Otto Seneca Falkenskiold (died c. 1918) and Marcus Frederik Falkenskiold (died 1928).

=== Christoffer Düssel von Falkenskiold ===
In his marriage with Else Sophie Bartholin, the younger brother Christoffer Düssel von Falkenskiold got one daughter, Else Margrethe von Falkenskiold (1737–1801), who married Constantin August Charisisius to Constantinsborg.

=== Martin Düssel von Falkenskiold ===
Martin Düssel von Falkenskiold married the noblewoman Dorthe Sophia von Schack of Kjærstrup and Bramsløkke (1710–1772) with whom he had three daughters and two sons, including: General Seneca Otto von Falkenskiold (1742–1820), Colonel, Noble courtier and major landowner, and Arnoldus von Falkenskiold (1744–1819) of Sæbygård and Sophienberg. Arnoldus von Falkenskiold's marriage with noblewoman Elisabeth Sehested of Broholm and Sæbygård (b. 1751) gave the son Courtier Anders Sehested von Falkenskiold of Sæbygård (1781–1841) who married the noblewoman Cathrine Hedevig de Leth (b. 1782) daughter of Lieutenant General Johan Frederik de Leth (1737–1817). They had seven sons.

== Property ==
Members of the Falkenskiold family owned a number of large estates and manor houses in Denmark which include:

- Sæbygård Estate
- Sæbygård Castle
- Falkenhøj Manor
- Lundsgaard Estate
- Frihedslund Manor
- Sophienberg Castle
- Eriksholm Castle
- Constantinsborg Manor

== See also ==
- Danish nobility
- Norwegian nobility

== Literature ==
- Dansk Adelskalender (1878): Falkenskiold at skislekt.no/adel.
