= Bartholomæus Bertelsen de Cederfeld =

Danish county governor (1715–1783)

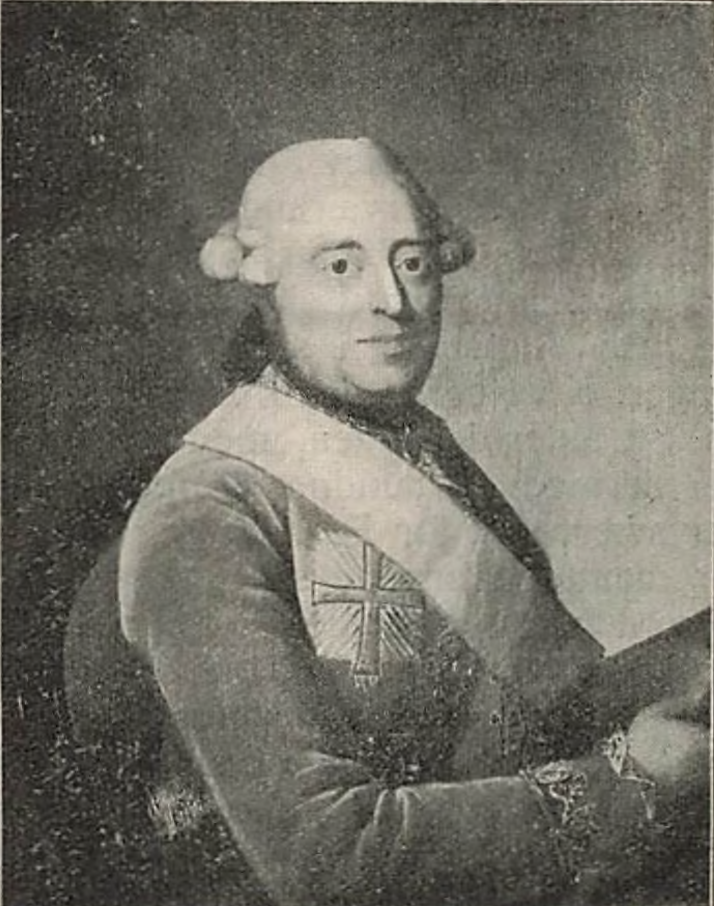
Bartholomæus de Cederfeld

Bartholomæus Bertelsen (19 January 1715 — 12 November 1783) was a Danish county governor and landowner. On 25 May 1759, he was ennobled under the name de Cederfeld.

== Early life and education ==
Bartholomæus Bertelsen was born on 19 January 1715 in Roost, a place in the parish of Arrild Sogn as son of bailiff (herredsfoged) Lorents Berthelsen and Anna Cathrine Monrad. He studied in Jena.

== Career ==
In 1737, Bertelsen became secretary for Christian Ernst, Count Stolberg-Wernigerode, a court official under Christian VI. He was later awarded the title of kancelliråd and was appointed as president in Aalborg and county administrator of Aalborghus, Åstrup, Børglum and Sejlstrup counties. In 1749, he was granted the title of justitsråd. On 23 November 1767, he was made a member of the Extra-Tax Commission. On 16 February 1768, he was promoted to komferensråd. In 1770, he was dismissed from all of his positions by Johann Friedrich Struensee as part of a wide-ranging restructure of the Danish government and administration. After Struense's own dismissal, Bertelsen returned to public office. On 31 August 1771, he was appointed county governor of Kalundborg, Sæbygaard, Dragsholm and Holbæk. On 26 July 1781, he lost the administration of Holbæk County but continued as governor of the three other counties until his death.

== Possessions and ennoblement ==
On 25 May 1759, he was ennobled under the name Cederfeld. On 5 May 1779, he became a Knight of the Order of the Dannebrog.

In 1762, he acquired the estate Frydendal (now Torbenfeldt) at Holbæk. In 1765, he sold it to Stephen Hansen.

== Personal life ==
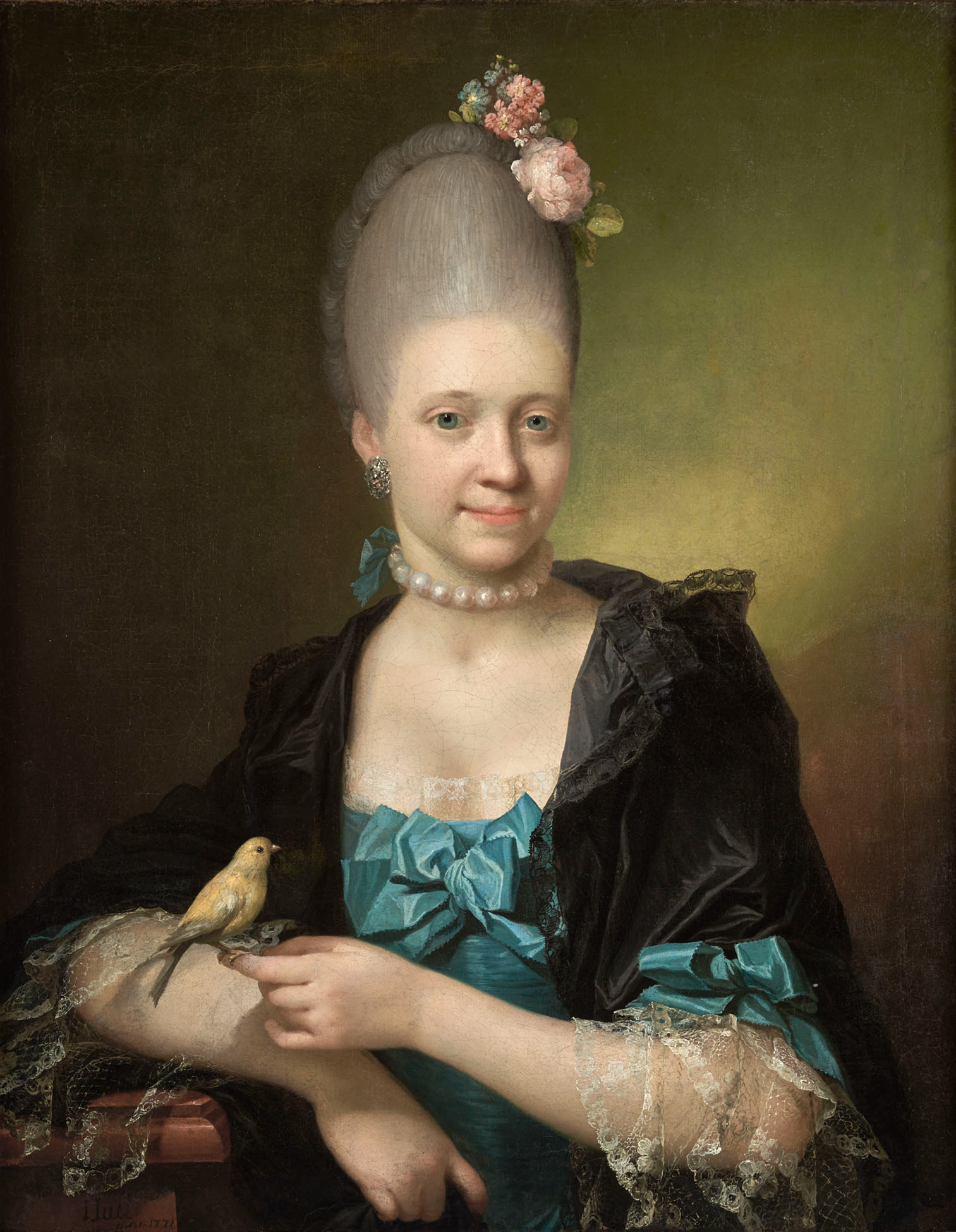
Sophie Charlotte de Cederfeld (1747–1799)

In 745, he married Cathrine Marie Brand (1727–1756). She was the daughter of justitsråd Mathias Brand and Mette Marcussen. They were the parents of a son and two daughters. Their son Niels Emanuel de Thygeson (1772 - 1860) was a landowner and served as county governor in Norway. Their daughter Sophie Charlotte de Cederfeld (1747–1797) was married to the landowner Tyge Jesper de Tygesen. Their daughter Anna Cathrine Claudine de Cederfeld (1755–1822) was married to generalmajor and landholder Peter Paulsen (1735–1815).

Civic offices
Preceded by Carl Adolph Rantzau	County governor of Holbæk; 1771–1781	Succeeded by Michael Herman Løvenskiold
Preceded by Carl Adolph Rantzau	County governor of Kalundborg; 1771–1783	Succeeded by Michael Herman Løvenskiold
Preceded by Carl Adolph Rantzau	County governor of Dragsholm; 1771–1793	Succeeded by Michael Herman Løvenskiold
Preceded by Carl Adolph Rantzau	County governor of Sæbygaard; 1771–1793	Succeeded by Michael Herman Løvenskiold
