= Kalundborg County =

Former Danish county

Kalundborg County (Danish: Kalundborg Amt) was a Danish county on Zealand. The largest town in the county was Kalundborg.

== History ==
Kalundborg County was created in 1662 as a replacement of the old Kalundborg Fief (Kalundborg Len). The county consisted of the hundreds Ars, Samsø and Skippinge (with the exception of the island Sejrø which belonged to Dragsholm County. At the 1793 Danish County Reform, Kalundborg, Dragsholm and Sæbygaard counties were all merged into Holbæk County.

== List of county governors ==
The governors of Kalundborg county from 1658 until its dissolution in 1804 were:

Portrait	Name	Term	
	Joachim Gersdorff	1658—1661	Acting county governor.
	Henrik Müller	1662—1664	
	Jørgen Bjelke	1664–1696	
	Johan Christopher Schönbach	1696–1727	
	Frederik Adeler	1707–1727	
	Joachim Hartvig Johan von Barner	1751–1768	
	Eiler Christopher Ahlefeldt	1768–1770	
	Carl Adolph Rantzau	1770–1771	
	Bartholomæus Bertelsen (de Cederfeld)	1771–1781	
	Michael Herman Løvenskiold	1781–1804	
