= Lerchenborg =

Manor house in Kalundborg Municipality, Denmark

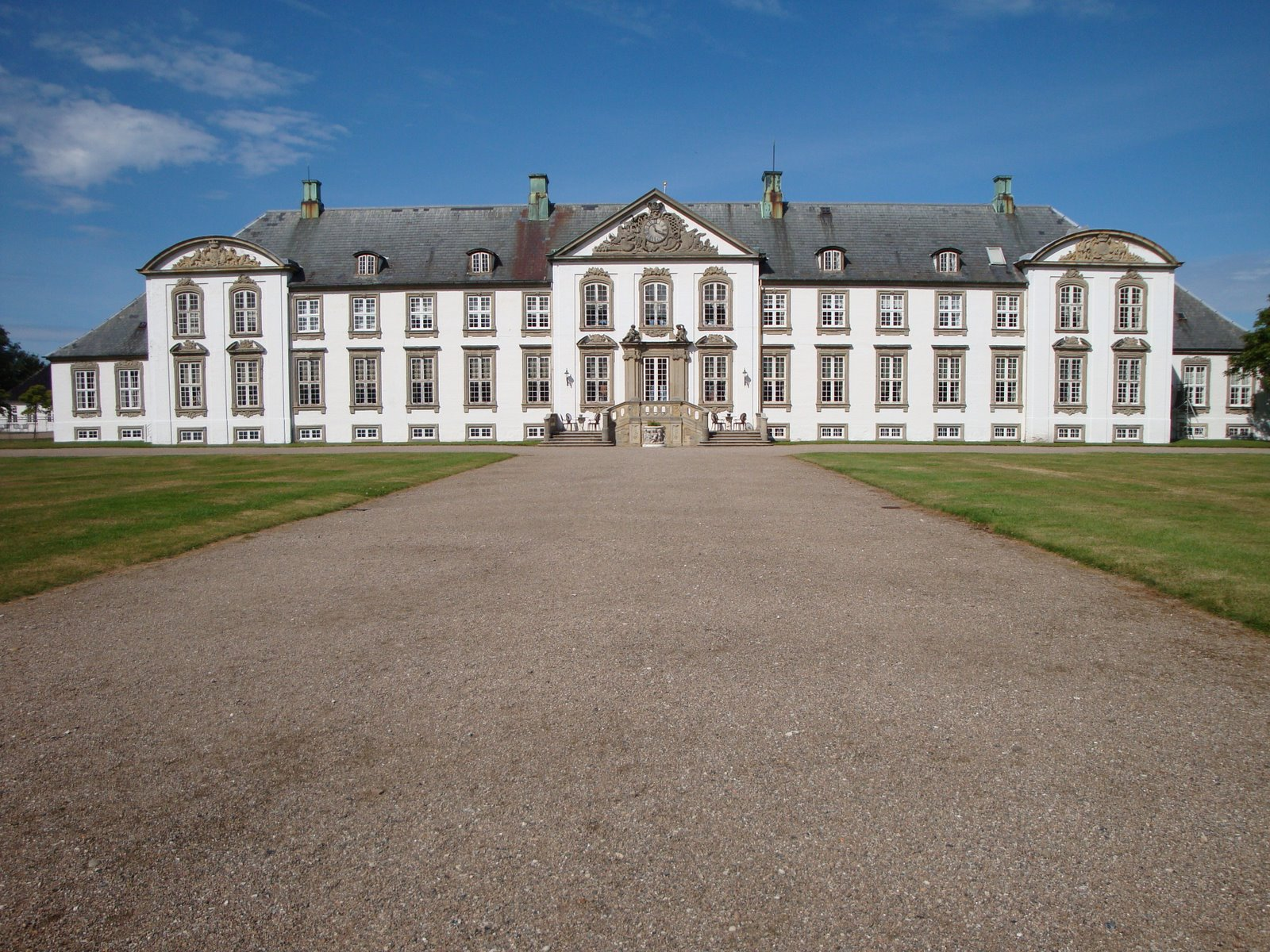
- Lerchenborg's main wing viewed from the gardens
- Interactive map of the Lerchenborg area

General information
- Architectural style: Rococo
- Location: Kalundborg, Denmark
- Coordinates: 55°39′12.93″N 11°04′47.30″E
- Construction started: 1743
- Client: Christian Lerche

Lerchenborg is a manor house located 4 km south of Kalundborg on the west coast of Zealand, Denmark.

== History ==
=== Origins ===
The estate was established by Carl von Ahlefeldt in 1704 when he closed down the village of Østrup to establish Østrupgård from land that used to belong to Kalundborg Castle.

In 1742 Østrupgård was acquired by general Christian Lerche (1692–1757). The large estate included 7 manors, 13 churches and extensive woodlands, taking in practically all of Kalundborg Amt. Lerche constructed a new seat on the estate, probably assisted by Nicolai Eigtved, Denmark's leading architect of the time.

Lerche received the Order of the Elephant in 1748 and was given status of count in 1752. He renamed his estate Lerchenborg in 1754 but did not establish it as a county (grevskab) which, since he had no direct heirs, would fall back to the king. Instead he founded a stamhus which secured succession rights for other lines of the Lerche family.

==== 19th century ====
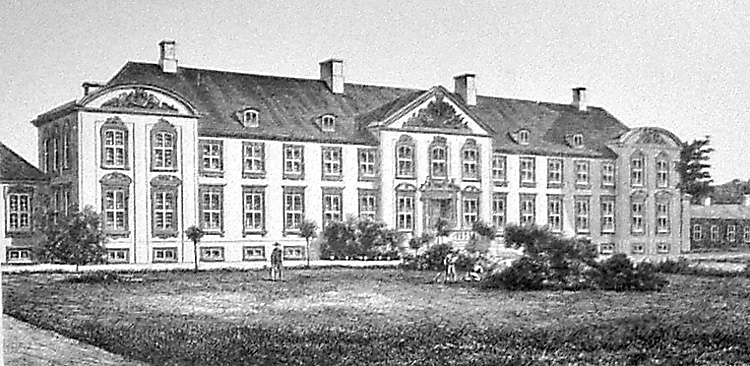
Lerchenborg in the late 19th century

In 1804, Christian Cornelius Lerche inherited Lerchenborg. On 26 May 1818, he was created Count of Lerchenborg, combining the estate with Aunsøgård, Mineslund, Asnæsgård, Lerchenfeld, Birkendegård, Vesterbygaard, Astrup and Davrup to form the County of Lerchenborg (Grevskabet Lerchenborg).

In 1862, Hans Christian Andersen stayed at Lerchenborg for a week as guest of Count C.A. Lerche.

=== 20th century ===
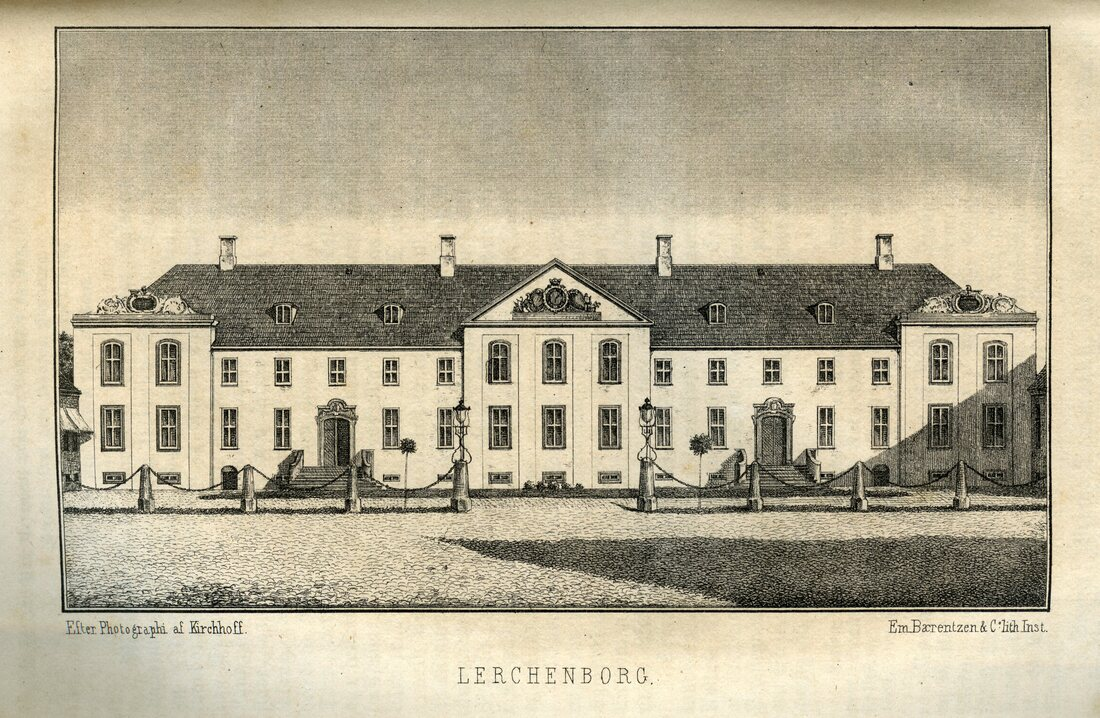
Æerchenborg photographed by Kirchhoff.

The county was dissolved in 1923 and the Lerchenborg estate passed out of the Lerche family's ownership in 1927. However, in 1952 it was reacquired by a member of the family, Christian Albrecht Frederik Lerche-Lerchenborg, and has been owned by the Lerchenborg counts ever since. Mineslund and Asnæsgården were sold off in connection with the reacquission.

== Architecture ==
Lerchenborg is a three-winged white-washed Rococo complex, consisting of a two-storey, seventeen bay main wing and two lower, detached lateral wings. The main wing has a three-bay median risilit with a triangular pediment and corner projections of two bays with rounded pediments, all with Rococo decorations. The rear side is basically of the same pattern. There is a central entrance on each side of the building.

== Interior ==
The house has fine Rococo style interiors. The hipped roofs on all three buildings are of slate, although originally they had red tiles.

== Surroundings ==
The entire complex of main building, farm buildings and park form a strictly symmetrical unity in accordance with the aesthetic principles of the Baroque. On one side, the house is approached through a hierarchy of courtyards, formed by barns and stables, and on the other side the central axis of the complex continues through the park and into the countryside.

The original French-style Baroque garden was designed by the Belgian-Danish architect and engineering officer Jean Baptiste de Longueville but most of it was adapted into an English-style landscape garden in the 19th century. Today the park has an area of 20 hectares.

== Owners ==
- (1300–1658) The Crown
- (1658–1680) Gabriel Marselis
- (1680–1703) Frants Marselis
- (1703–1722) Carl von Ahlefeldt
- (1722–1724) Ulrikke Amalie Danneskiold-Laurvig
- (1724–1726) Christoffer Watkinson
- (1726–1729) The estate of Christoffer Watkinsons
- (1729–1742) John de Thornton
- (1742–1757) Christian Lerche
- (1757–1766) Amalie Margrethe Christiane Caroline Leiningen-Westerburg née Lerche
- (1766–1798) Georg Flemming Lerche
- (1798–1852) Christian Cornelius Lerche-Lerchenborg
- (1852–1885) Christian Albrecht Lerche
- (1885–1927) Christian Cornelius Lubbi Lerche-Lerchenborg
- (1927–1928) J. Bruhn
- (1928–1950) Peter Andreas Lund
- (1950–1952) Enkefru Marie Lund
- (1952) Statens Jordlovsudvalg
- (1952–1970) Christian Albrecht Frederik Lerche-Lerchenborg
- (1970–1985) Christian Alfred Vincents Lerche-Lerchenborg
- (1985–Present) Christian Cornelius Knud Lerche-Lerchenborg

== See also ==
- Lerkenfeld
