= Herman Løvenskiold (1783–1825) =

Danish baron and county governor

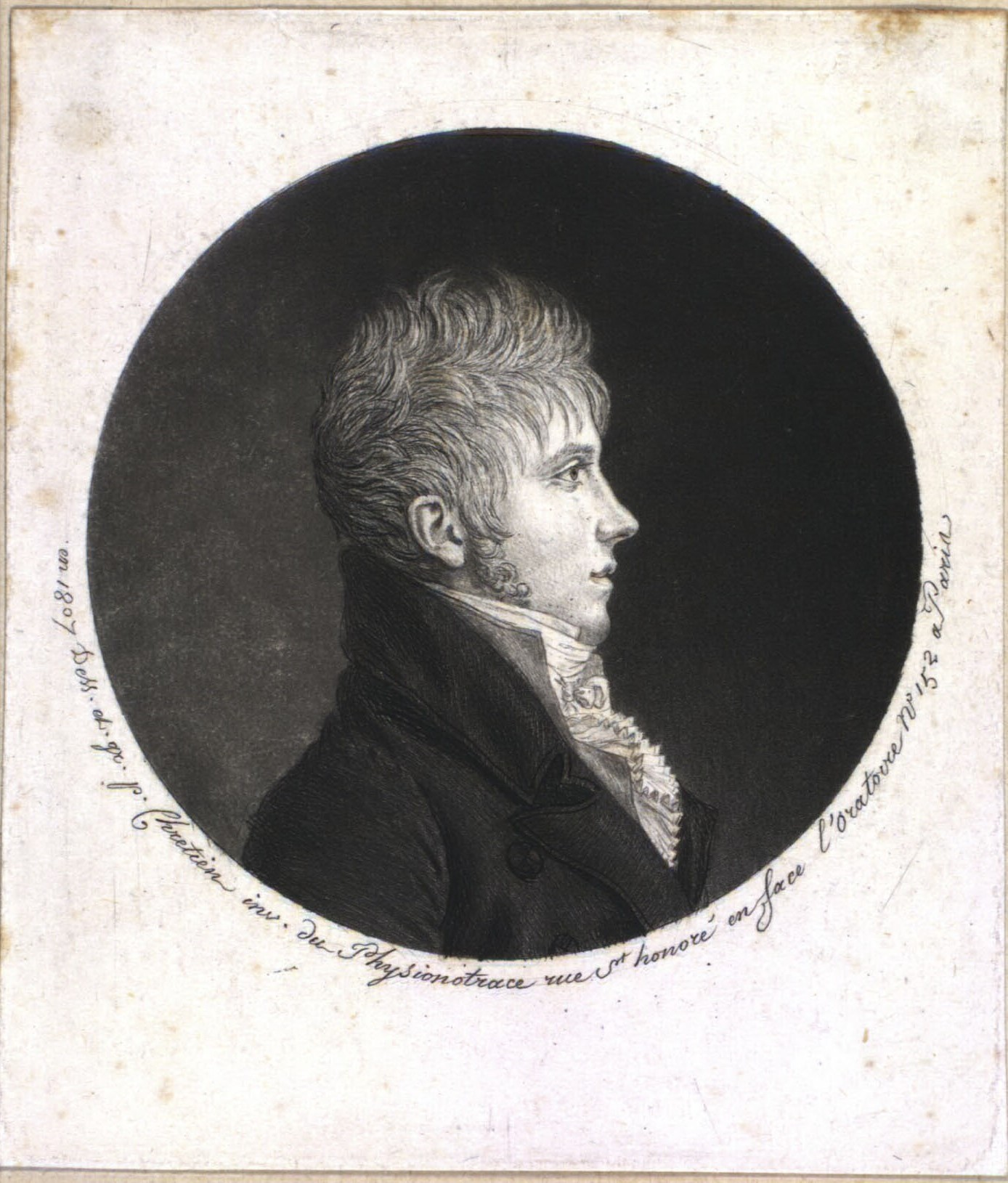
Portrait of Herman Løvensjiold by Gilles-Louis Chrétien

Herman Løvenskiold (24 January 1783 – 24 November 1825) was a Danish baron who served as county governor of Holbæk and Svendborg.

== Early life ==
Løvenskiold was born on 24 January 1783 in Porsgrund in Telemark, Norway to Severin Løvenskiold the Elder and Benedicte Henriette v. Aall. He was the brother of Severin Løvenskiold.

== Career ==
He started his career as an army officer. In 1793, he earned a law degree (cand.jur.) from the University of Copenhagen. In the same year, he briefly served as acting county governor of Vejle County.

On 1 February 1811, he was appointed as county governor of Holbæk County. On 23 January 1812, he was awarded the title of chamberlain (kammerherre). On 4 May 1814, he resigned as county governor due to poor health. From 24 June 1817 to 9 February 1822, he served as county governor of Svendborg County. After that, he became a councillor (deputeret) in Danske Kancelli.

== Personal life ==
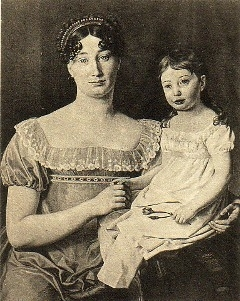
Sophie Hedevig Løvenskiold with their daughter Sophie

Løvensjiold was married to baroness Sofie Hedevig Adeler til Adlersborg on 8 October 1813. She was the daughter of the then-deceased former governor of Holbæk Frederik Adeler.

Løvenskiol died on 24 November 1825 in Montpellier. His daughter and only surviving child Berthe Henriette Frederikke Løvenskiold brought the Barony of Adlersborg into her marriage to Georg Frederik Otto Lensbaron Zytphen, who assumed the name Zytphen-Adeler.

Civic offices
Preceded by Johan Henrik Selmer	County Governor of VejleCounty; 1809–1809	Succeeded by Johan Henrik Selmer
Preceded by Christian Cornelius Lerche	Vounty governor of Holbæk; 1811–1815	Succeeded by Julius Knuth
Preceded by Peter Chr. Schumacher	County Governor of SvendborgCounty; 1817–1822	Succeeded by Frederik Sporon
