= Arnoldus von Falkenskiold =

Military officer and landowner

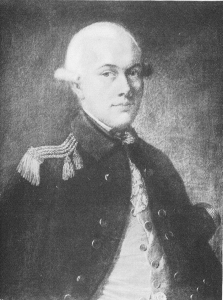
Arnoldus von Falkenskiold.

Arnoldus von Falkenskiold (11 June 1743–15 May 1819) was a Danish Noble courtier, colonel and major landowner who is renowned for his agricultural reforms in Denmark. He was the son of nobleman Martin Dyssel von Falkenskiold and brother of general Otto von Falkenskiold who was sentenced to life imprisonment for his support of privy councillor Count Johann Struensee but later released. Arnoldus was the owner of Sæbygård Manor at Kalundborg and Sophienberg Castle at Hørsholm and founded the manors of Falkenhøj (1787) and Frihedslund (1790).

== Early life ==
Falkenskiold was born on 1 June 1743 in Kalundborg, the son of lieutenant colonel Martin Morten Düssel Falkenskiold and Dorothea Sophie née Schack. His father's original family name was Dyssel but he had been ennobled by letters patent in 1716 under the name Falkenskiold, thus founding the Falkenskiold noble family.

== Military career ==
Falkenskiold became a cornet in 1762 and was promoted to second lieutenant in 1764. He joined the Zealand Dragoon Regiment in 1767, reaching the rank of captain in 1770 and major in 1772. He was dismissed in 1783 but was later given rank of colonel.

== Property ==
In 1779, Falkenskiold purchased Sæbygård for 72,000 Danish rigsdaler. He turned the farm Falkenhøj into a separate manor in 1787 and in 1790 he also detached another manor which was given the name Frihedslund. He sold Sæbygård again in 1797 for 175,000 Danish rigsdaler a few years later, probably in 1800, he also sold Falkenhøj and Frihedslund to count Christian Rantzau-Ascheberg. He then bought Sophienberg at Hørsholm. He reduced the size of the former royal residence by shortening the building and removing the upper floor.

Falkenskiold was the first farmer in Denmark to import British pigs. He contributed to a number of agricultural journals of his day, writing about subjects such as pig breeding, the use of root crops as cattle feed (1804), the use of potatoes, and obstacles for a more efficient agricultural industry.

== Personal life ==
Falkenskiold married noblewoman Elisabeth Sehested of Broholm (1751-1843), a daughter of lieutenant colonel Anders Sehested of Broholm in 1775. They had nine children of which seven lived to adulthood:

- Dorthea Sophie Falkenskiold (7 October 1776–21 May 1864)
- Birgitte Ottine von Falkenskiold (12 August 1779–22 April 1839), married Mathias Christian de Leth
- Vibeke Marie Falkenskjold (19 September 1778–25 August 1831), married Christian Schøller
- Noble courtier Andreas Sehested Falkenskiold (1781–12 December 1841), married Catharina Hedevig de Leth. They have seven sons.
- Arnoldine Elisabeth Falkenskiold (1783–3 December 1792)
- Edel Margrethe Sehested Falkenskiold (1784–2 February 1876)
- Christiane Frederikke Falkenskiold (1785–16 December 1832)
- Martin Dyssel Falkenskiold (1791–11 February 1793)
- Elisabeth (Elisa) Birgitte Falkenskiold (1793–24 November 1872)

Falkenskiold died on 15 May 1819 at Sophienberg. He is buried in Hørsholm Cemetery.
