= Frihedslund =

Manor house near Kalundborg, Denmark

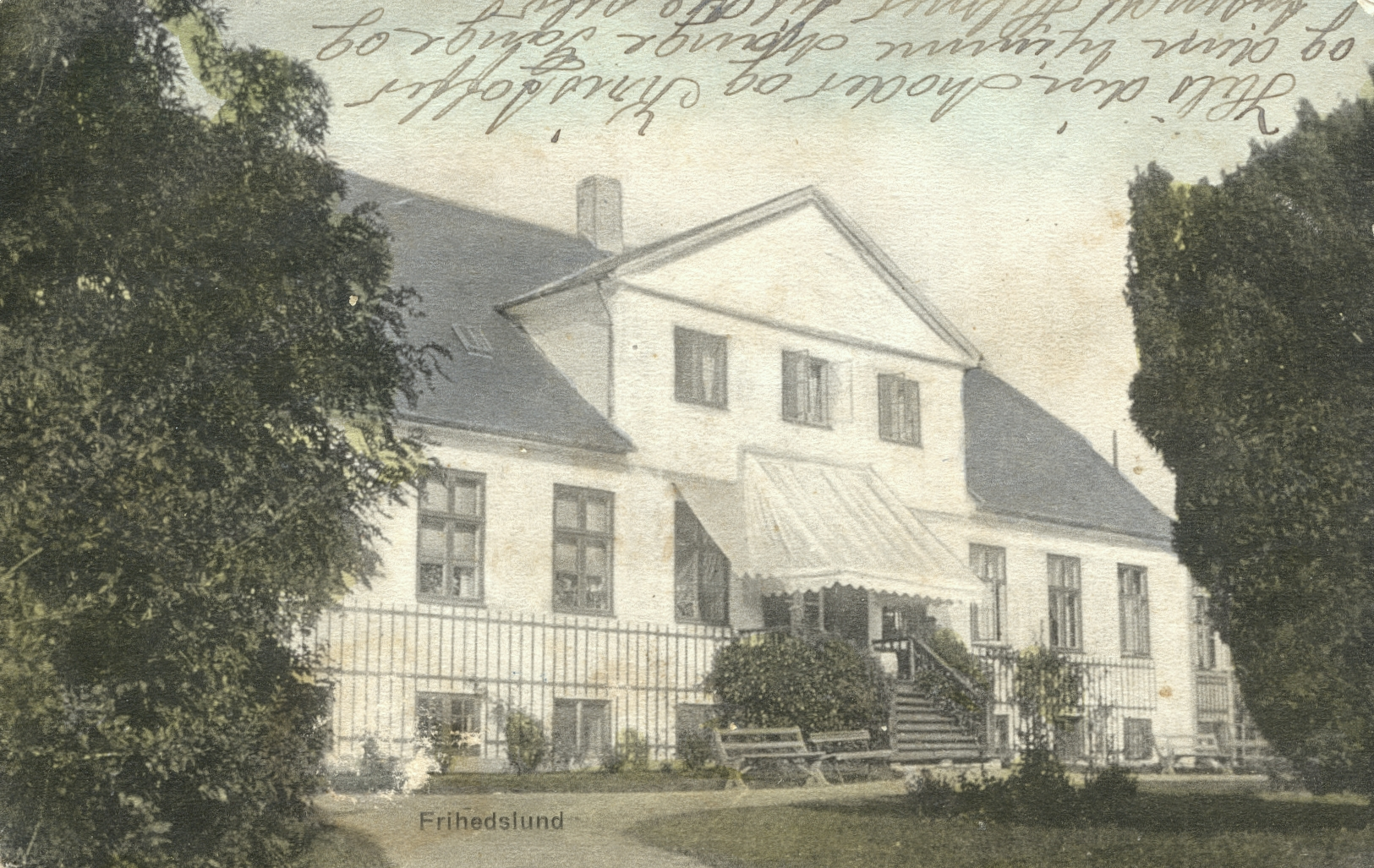

General information
- Location: Sæbyvej 60 A 4291 Ruds Vedby, Kalundborg, Denmark
- Coordinates: 55°33′36″N 11°19′48″E

Frihedslund is a manor house and estate located on the east side of Tissø, Kalundborg Municipality some 70 kilometres (43 mi) west of Copenhagen, Denmark. The estate is now owned by the Jarl Foundation and operated as an educational centre for agriculture students under the name Frihedslund Lærergård.

== History ==
=== 18th century ===
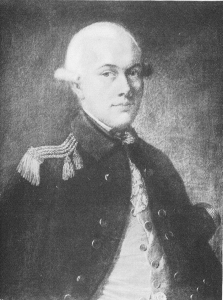
Arnoldus von Falkenskiold

Arnoldus von Falkenskiold, a former army officer with the rank of colonel, bought the manor of Sæbygaard in 1779. He turned the farm Falkenhøj into a separate manor in 1787, and in 1790, he also detached another manor, which was given the name Frihedslund (lit. "Liberty Grove"). Falkenskiold had a profound interest in the management of his estates and was a keen supporter of the great agricultural reforms of the time. He was the first farmer in Denmark to import British pigs. He contributed to a number of agricultural journals of his day. When he sold Sæbygaard and acquired Sophienberg at Hørsholm, in 1797, Frihedslund was not included in the sale.

=== 19th century ===
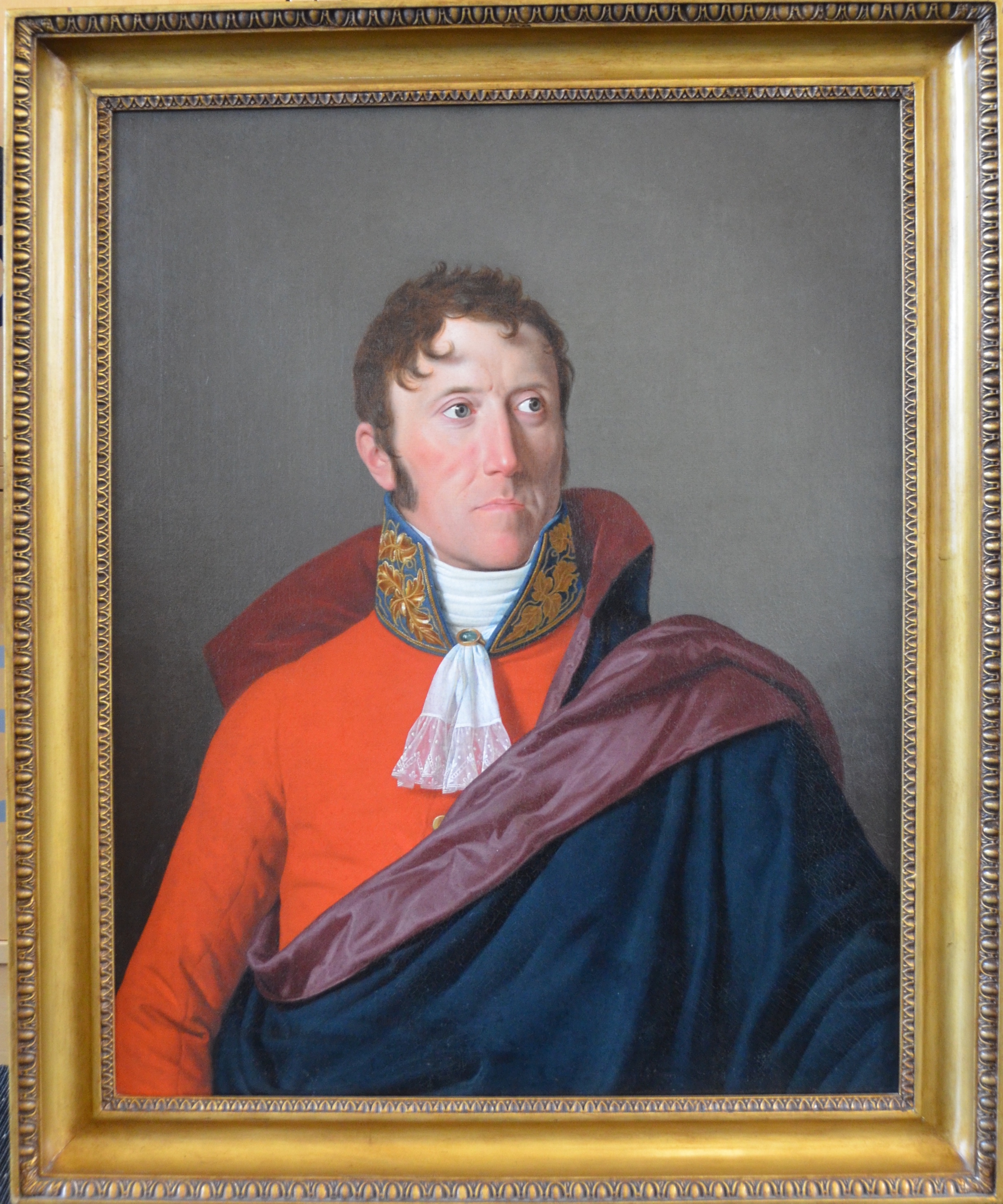
C. W. Eckersberg: Frederik Hoppe

In around 1800, Falkenskiold sold Frihedslund to Christian, Count Rantzau-Ascheberg, who had recently also acquired Sæbygaard, thus reuniting the two estates. Both estates were shortly thereafter sold for 240,000 Danish rigsdaler to general war commissioner Haagen Christian Astrup.

In 1806, Astrup sold Sæbygård, Frihedslund and Løvenborg to Frederik Hoppe, who had recently sold Rosenfeldt at Vordingborg. In 1809, Hoppe sold Frihedslund to A.H. Bachmann. It is not clear when Bachmann parted with the estate. One source states that he stayed on the estate until his death, in 1721, but that he had already sold it in 1711 to Agnethe Marie, Countess Rosencrone (née Hielmstierne). Another source states that she bought the estate from his heirs in 1833.

Harald Rothe

In 1824, Rosencrone sold the estate to army major Harald Rothe. He was already the owner of Aggersvold at Jyderup i(since1806) and Egholm at Roskilde (1809). In the same year, he was ennobled by letters patent. He was the son of Casper Peter Rothe and Edle Cathrine Severine Soelberg of Urup Manior at Horsens. His wife, Wilhelmine Antoinette Fix, was a daughter of the merchant Johan Leonhard Fix.

Harald Rothe's heirs sold the estate to first lieutenant Jacob Vilhelm Saxtorph in 1850. His son, Sylvester Saxtorph, a prominent medical doctor, was born on the estate in 1851.

In 1859, Frihedslund was sold to Valdemar Hvist. He was a son of Lauritz Nicolai Hvidt, one of the most influential Danish politicians of his time. He had prevuiusly leased the estate Fuglebjerg. His widow kept the estate after his death. In 1895, it was passed to their son Daniel Hvidt (18531937). He was the brother of Supreme Court justice Edward Hvidt and engineer Valdemar Hvidt (father of painter Daniel Hvidt).

=== 20th century ===
In 1938, Hvidt's heirs sold Frihedslund to by Børge Strand. He later purchased 55 hectares of land from the owner of Falkenhøj. The estate was in 1965 purchased by Jarlfonden.

== Estate ==
The main building is a single-storey, Neoclassical building with a two-storey, gabled avant-corps on both sides. The half hipped roof is clad in grey tiles. The garden features a small lake. The land is protected.

== Today ==
The Jarl Foundation (Jarlfonden) operates the estate as an educational centre for agricultural apprentices under the name Frihedslund Lærergård. The foundation, which was founded by the landowner and artist Axel Harl in 1949, is also the owner of Marienhøj at Ruds Vedby. The foundation is also leasing the farmland of the neighbouring estates Selchausdal and Hallebygården with a combined area of 273 hectares and another 75 hectares of farmland at four other sites. The two estates have a combined area of approximately 360 hectares. It is also the owner of the Strødam Nature Reserve at Hillerød (160 hectares).

== List of owners ==
- (1790-1800) Arnoldus von Falkenskiold
- (1800-1801) Christian Rantzau-Ascheberg
- (1800-1806) Haagen Christian Astrup
- (1806-1809) Frederik Hoppe
- (1809-1823) A.H. Bachmann
- (1823-1824) Agnethe Marie Hielmstierne, gift Rosencrone
- (1824- ) Harald Rothe
- ( -1850) Harald Rothe
- (1850-1860) J.V. Saxtorph
- (1860-1878) Valdemar Hvidt
- (1878-1895) Enke efter Valdemar Hvidt
- (1895-1937) Daniel Hvidt
- (1938- ) Børge Strand
- (1965–present) Jarlfonden

== See also ==
- Algestrup
