= Frederik Hoppe (landowner) =

18th-century Danish landowner

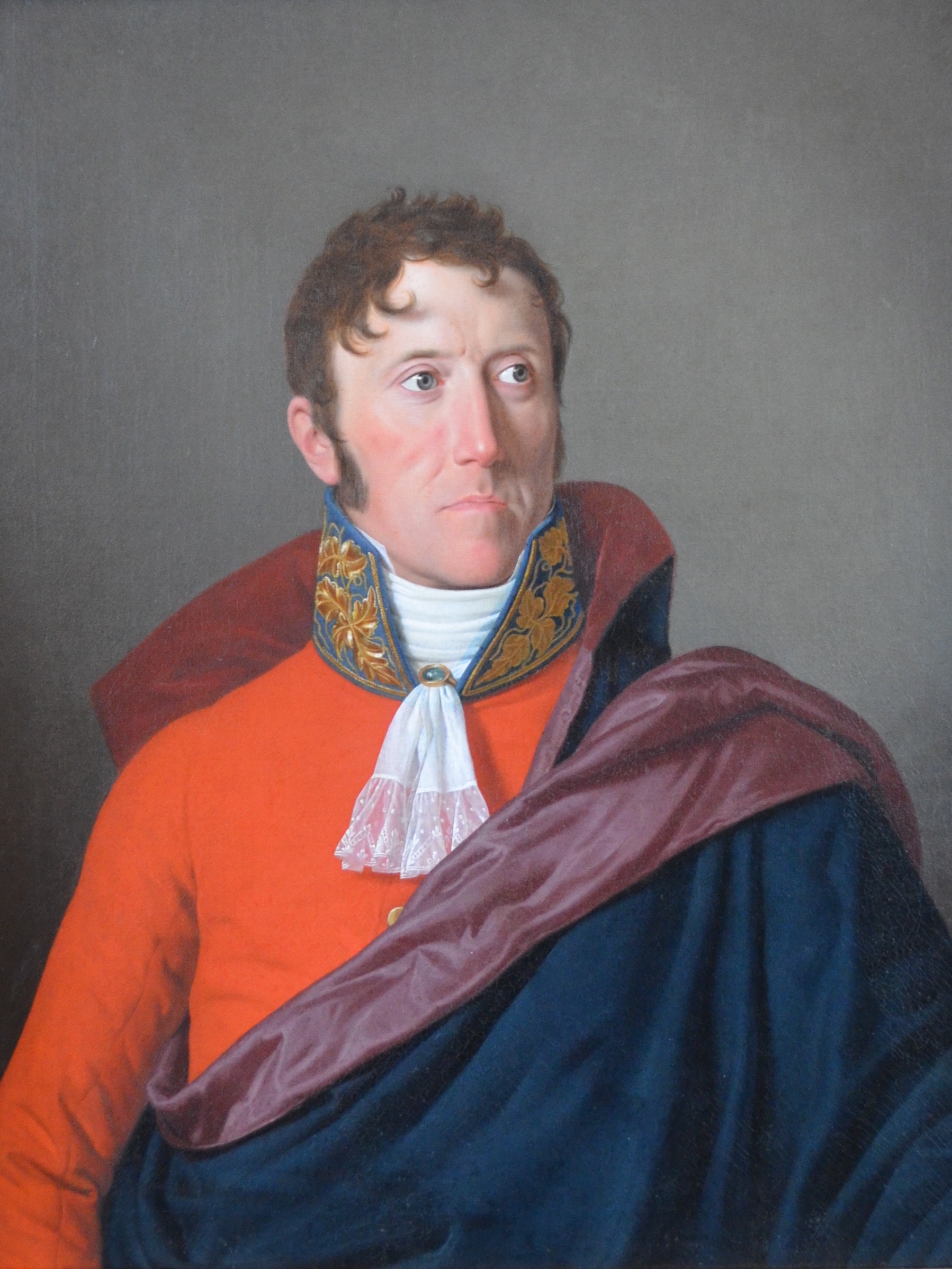
- Jacob Holm painted in 1834
- Born: 18 September 1770; Copenhagen, Denmark
- Died: 22 February 1837 (aged 66); Copenhagen, Denmark
- Occupation: Landowner

Frederik Hoppe (18 September 1770 – 22 February 1837) was a Danish landowner, chamberlain and Member of the Royal Hunt (hofjægermester). He owned the Bernstorff Mansion in Copenhagen as well as the estates Løvegård and Søbygård at Kalundborg.

== Early life and education ==
Hoppe was born on 18 September 1770 in Copenhagen, the third of four children of Supreme Court justice Peder Hoppe (1727–1778) and Elisabeth Hoppe née Holst (1740–1773). An elder brother by the same name had died before he was born. His mother died when he was just three years old. His father was ennobled in 1777. After his death the following year, Hoppe was brought up in the house of professor Børge Riisbrigh. He enrolled at the University of Copenhagen in 1787.

On reaching the age of majority, he received an inheritance of 20,000 species daler from his father and 80,000 species daler from his uncle Abraham Pelt. On 31 July 1790, he was appointed as kammerjunker. On 5 February 1791, he graduated with a degree in law from the university. In 1792, he travelled to Göttingen with the mineralogist G. Wad to continue his studies. On 11 February 1795, he was engaged as a student teacher. His younger brother, Johan Christopher Hoppe, a naval officer, reached the rank of counter admiral.

== Property ==
In 1800, Hoppe purchased Bernstorff Mansion on Bredgade. In 1803, Hoppe purchased Rosenfeldt and Avnøgård (with Nygaards Mølle and Vordingborg Færgegård as well as Kastrup and Sværdborg kirketiende and kongetiende from Jens Lund for 200,000 rigsdaler but sold them again in 1804–1805. In 1806, he then purchased the estates Sæbygaard, Frihedslund and Løvegaard at Kalundborg. In 1809, he sold Frihedslund. In 1810, he also parted with Løvegaard. Søbygaard remained in his ownership until 1829.

On 28 January 1811, he was appointed chamberlain (kammerherre). On 30 January 1817, he became a member of the Royal Hunt (Hofjægermester).

== Personal life ==
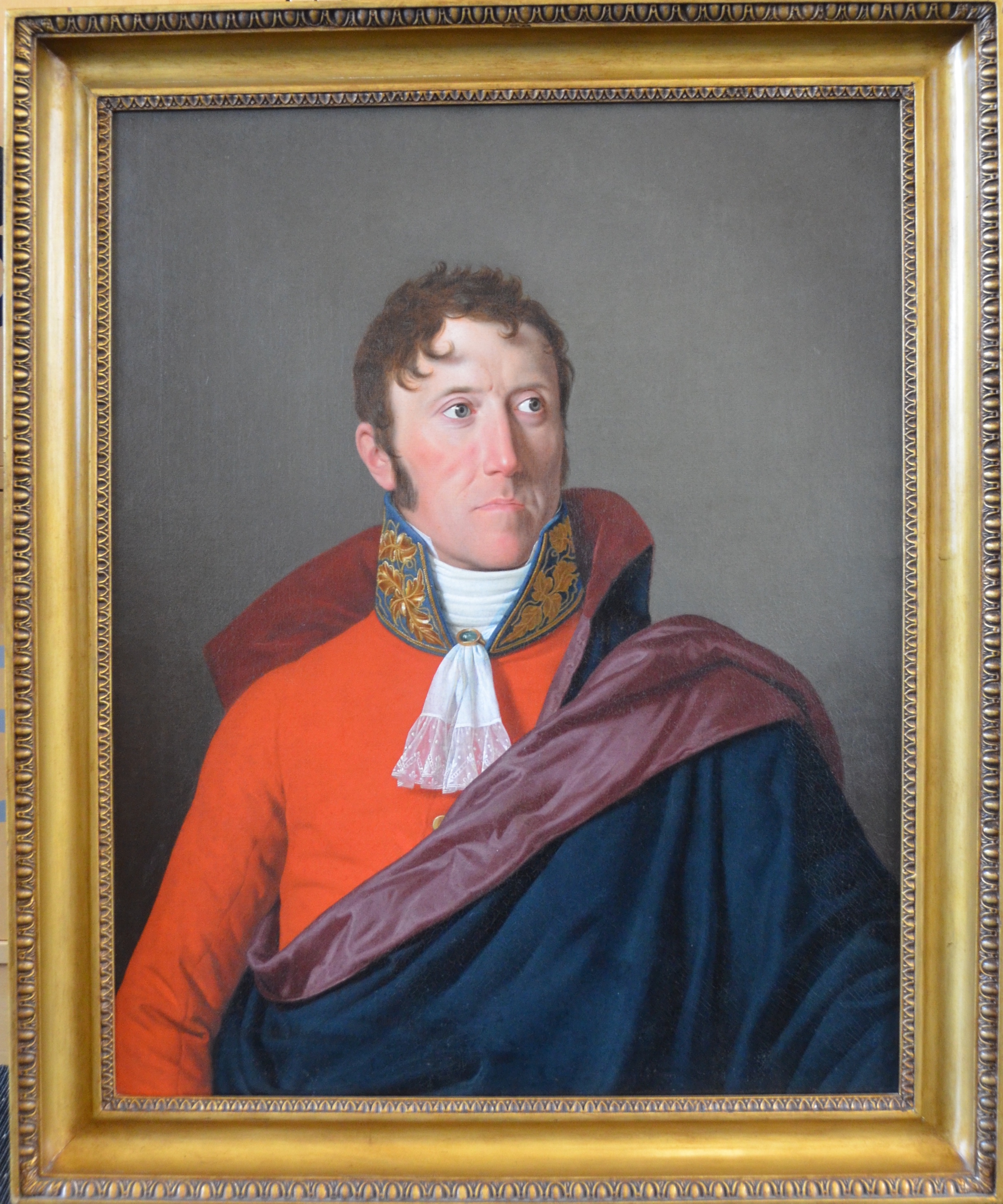
Portrait of Hoppe by C.W. Eckersberg, 1819

On 14 December 1800 in Davinde Church, Hoppe was married to Josephine Marie Skeel (1780–1821), daughter of Jørgen Erik Skeel and Anne Dorothea von Ahlefeldt. They had six children, of which the four sons died without leaving offspring. The eldest of their two daughters, Anna Sophie Elisabeth Hoppe (1803–1881), was married to Christian Andreas Vind, owner of Sanderumgård and Bækkeskov. The younger daughter, Eleonora Sophie Frederikke Hoppe (1807–1866 in Vedbæk), was married to Georg Bernadotte Sehested (1808–1873), a forester.

Hoppe died on 22 February 1837 in Copenhagen. He is buried in Holmen Cemetery.
