= Johan Christopher Schönbach =

County governor and landowner

Johan Christoffer Schönbach (1663 – 10 February 1726) was a Danish county governor and landowner. He owned Birkendegård at Holbæk.

== Early life and education ==
Schönbach was born in 1663 to Johan Christoph Schonbach til Vandlinggaard and Elisabeth Lange. He was educated in Kiel from 1674. He became a Doctor of Law in 1780.

== Career ==
In 1684–92, he worked as a secretary in Tyske Kancelli. On 23 December 1683, he was appointed deputy county governor of Kalundborg, Sæbygaard and Dragsholm counties. From 16 May 1696 to 1707, he served as county governor of the same counties. From 1707, until his death, he served as county governor of Holbæk.

On 16 August 1709, he was awarded the title of etatsråd. In 1714, he was awarded the title of geheimeraad.

== Personal life ==
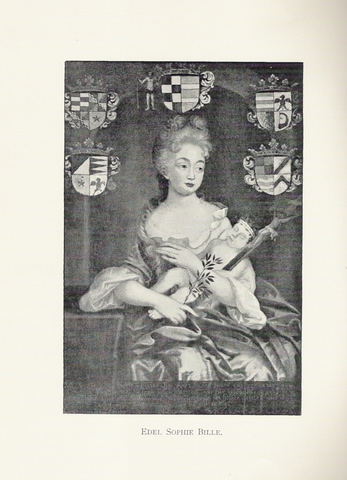
Edele Sophie Andersdatter Bille.

Schönbach was married twice. His first wife was Edel Sophie Bille (1654 —1706), She was a daughter of etatsraad Anders Bille til Løgismose and Beate Margrethe Bielcke. His second wife was Anna Elisabeth von Korff (died 1732).

In 1700, he bought Birkendegård at Holbæk. He died on 10 February 1826. On his second wife-s death, their heirs (two sons and a daughter) unsuccessfully tried to sell the estate in three different auctions. It was ultimately sold to Terkel Terkelsen.

== Notes ==
Government offices
Preceded by Jørgen Bjelke	County Governor of Kalundborg Amt; 1696–1726	Succeeded by Frederik Adeler
Preceded by Jørgen Bjelke	County Governor of Sæbygård amt 1696–1726	Succeeded by Frederik Adeler
Preceded by Jørgen Bjelke	County Governor of Dragsholm amt 1696–1726	Succeeded by Frederik Adeler
Preceded by Jørgen Bjelke	County Governor of Holbæk amt 1707–1726	Succeeded by Frederik Adeler
