= Jacob Brønnum Scavenius Estrup =

Danish politician

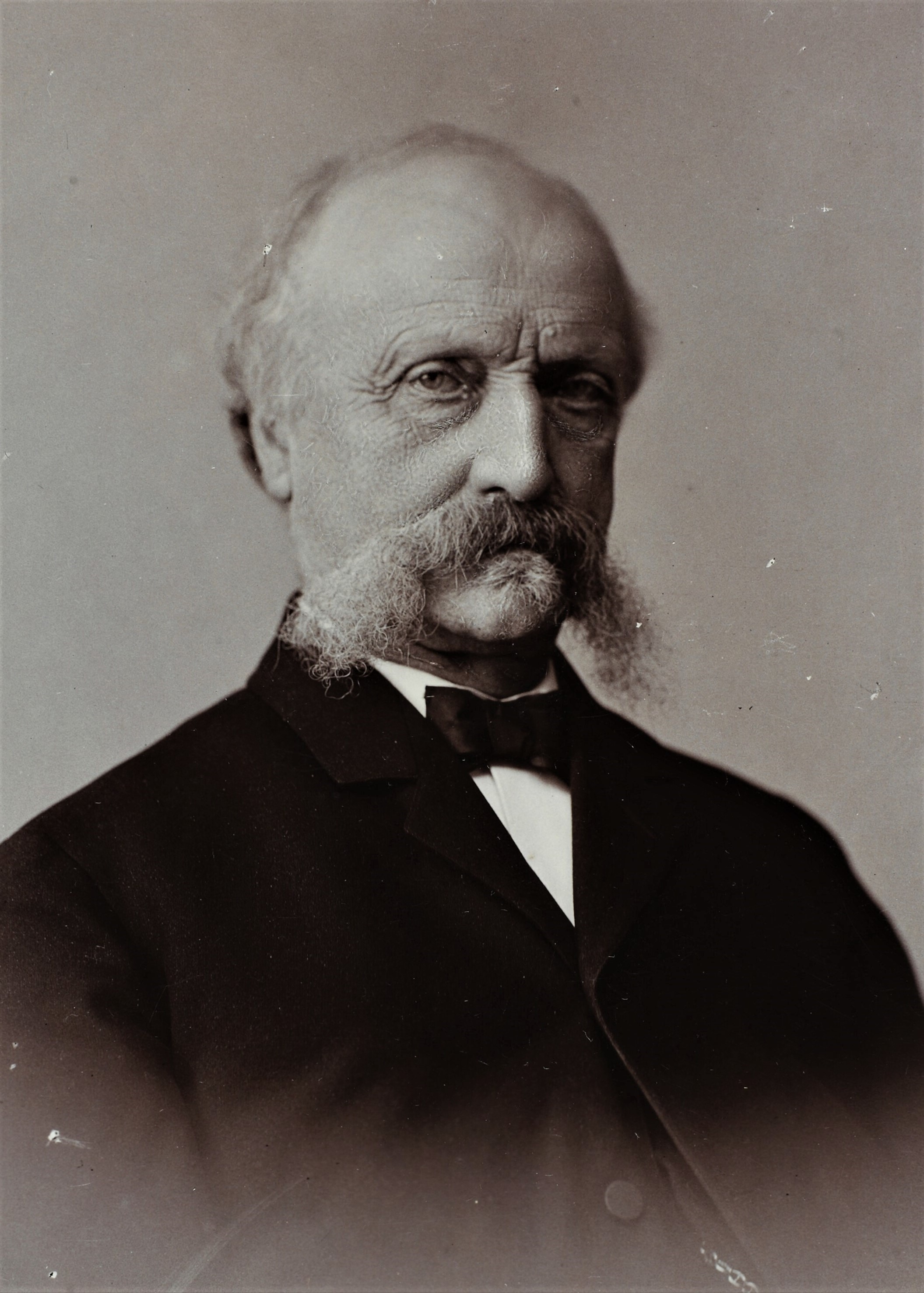

Council President of Denmark
- In office 11 June 1875 – 7 August 1894
- Monarch: Christian IX
- Preceded by: Christen Andreas Fonnesbech
- Succeeded by: Tage Reedtz-Thott

Minister for Finance
- In office 11 June 1875 – 7 August 1894
- Prime Minister: Himself
- Preceded by: Christian Andreas Fonnesbech
- Succeeded by: Christian Lüttichau

Minister of the Interior
- In office 6 November 1865 – 22 September 1869
- Prime Minister: Christian Frijs
- Preceded by: Frederik von Tillisch
- Succeeded by: Wolfgang von Haffner

Personal details
- Born: 16 April 1825 Sorø, Denmark
- Died: 24 December 1913 (aged 88) Kongsdal, Denmark
- Party: Højre
- Spouse: Regitze Holsten
- Children: 1

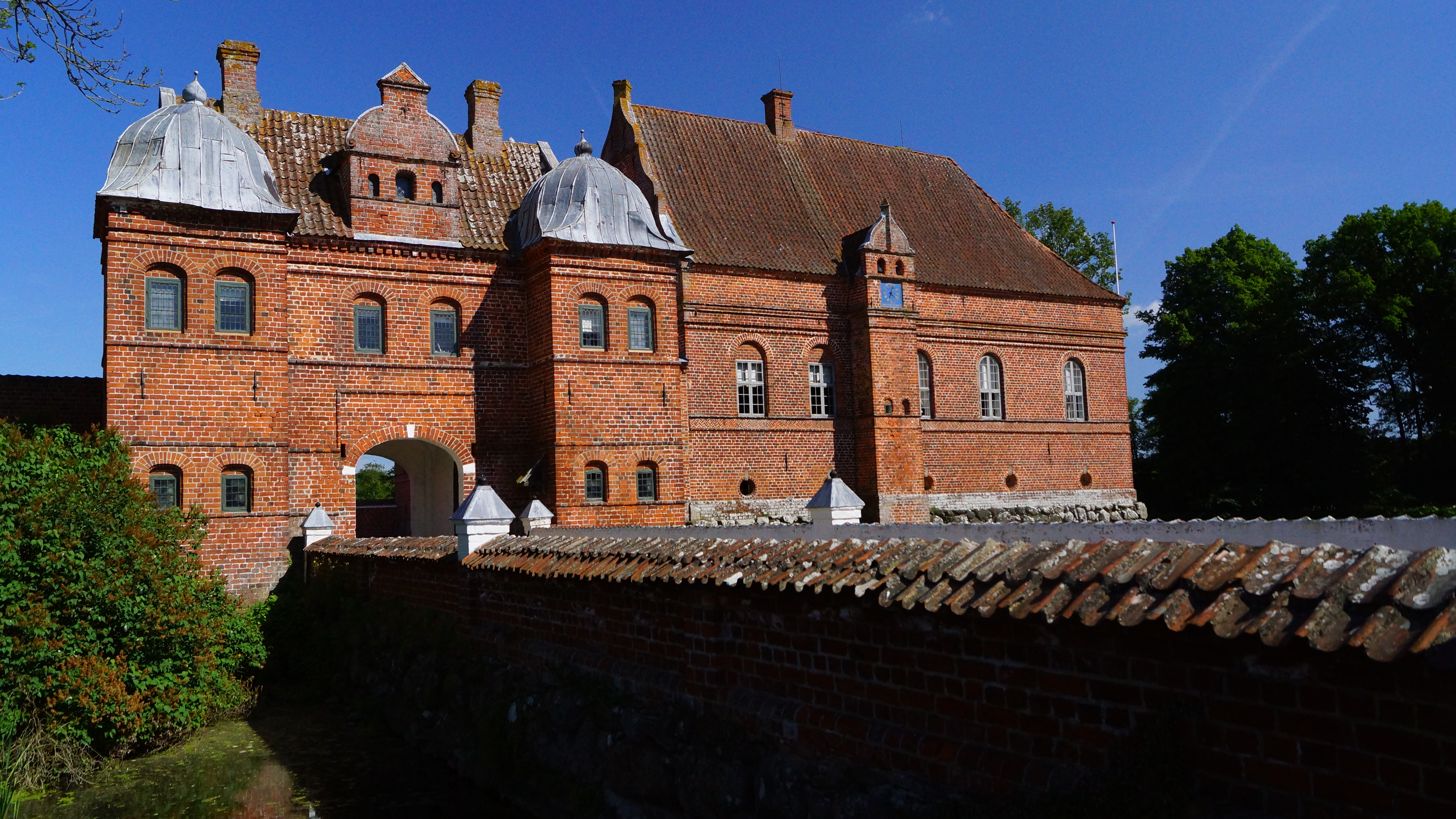
Skaføgård

Jacob Brønnum Scavenius Estrup (16 April 1825 – 24 December 1913), was a Danish politician, member of the Højre party. He was Interior Minister from 1865 to 1869 in the Cabinet of Frijs and Council President as well as Finance Minister from 1875 to 1894 as the leader of the Estrup Cabinet. At 19 years, he was the longest serving Danish prime minister.

From a Danish historical perspective, he is perhaps most famous (or infamous) for the so-called provisional time (provisorietiden) from 1885 to 1894. After a huge defeat in the 1884 Folketinget parliamentary election, in which the Højre party only gained 19 out of 102 seats, he simply refused to resign as Head of Government. (The title "konseilspresident" has later been changed to "statsminister" but both titles are equivalent to Prime Minister) He then wasn't able to get parliamentary support for the imperative annual Financial Laws, he instead managed to bring about King Christian IX's support for Provisional Financial Laws. This included support from the so-called Landstinget as well. The Landstinget was a smaller assembly of politicians, of which half of its members were chosen by the Monarch. A reason to why the Monarch agreed to nine such annual provisional laws, the King and Estrup both believed in the building of the Copenhagen defense wall (Københavns befæstning) at the time known as "Vestencienten" built between 1888 and 1892.

== Biography ==
Estrup was son of the landowner and headmaster at Sorø Academy Hector Frederik Janson Estrup (1794–1846) and Jacobine Scavenius (1800–1829), daughter of Jacob Brønnum Scavenius (1749–1820).

He inherited the estate Kongsdal in Holbæk amt in 1846. In 1852 he also bought the estate Skaføgård in Randers.

As Interior Minister in the Cabinet of Frijs, Estrup took control of the railroads of Jutland and Funen, which had been ceded to an English consortium in 1861. He expanded the railroads in Vendsyssel and built new lines from Skanderborg to Silkeborg and along the west coast of Jutland to Esbjerg, earning him the nickname "Railway Minister". He also built up the harbour in Esbjerg, which turned into an important center for exports. In 1869 he was forced to step down from his post because of health problems.

In 1875 Estrup was able to replace Christen Andreas Fonnesbech as Council President. Estrup himself also took the post as Finance Minister, perhaps the most important post as Denmark was economically worn down after the Second War of Schleswig. In 1877 Estrup was unable to secure support for his budget bill in Folketinget, as demanded by the Danish Constitution, but chose instead to issue it as a provisional law. This happened repeatedly in the years 1885 to 1894, the so-called provisional period (provisorietid). Among others he was opposed by the Venstre leaders Christen Berg and Viggo Hørup.

When an assassination attempt failed on 21 October 1885, Estrup responded by passing various laws restricting the press, restricting the right to own arms, and broadening the powers of the police. In 1894, Venstre and Estrup's Højre cooperated to pass a budget bill, and Estrup resigned. He would not hold any future offices as a minister but retained significant influence in the following governments formed by Højre.

== Personal life ==
He was decorated with the Order of the Elephant in 1878 with conferring rank of Grand Cross Knight of the Order of the Dannebrog and Dannebrogsmand. He was married in 1857 to Regitze Holsten-Charisius (1831-1896), daughter of Adam Christopher Holsten-Charisius. They were the parents of six children. Estrup died on Christmas Eve 1913 in Kongsdal and was buried at Undløse Church.

== Other sources ==
- Biography - From Museums in Copenhagen.
- Biography - From the Danish Biographical Lexicon, scanned by Project Runeberg.
- Contemporary drawing showing the assassination attempt on Estrup. Original: Woodcut, Illustreret Tidende 25 October 1885.

Political offices
| Preceded by Frederik Ferdinand von Tillisch | Interior Minister of Denmark; 6 November 1865 – 22 September 1869 | Succeeded by Wolfgang von Haffner |
| Preceded by Christen Andreas Fonnesbech | Council President of Denmark; 11 June 1875 – 7 August 1894 | Succeeded by Tage Reedtz-Thott |
| Preceded by Christen Andreas Fonnesbech | Finance Minister of Denmark; 11 June 1875 – 7 August 1894 | Succeeded by Christian Lüttichau |
