= Peter Lange-Müller =

Danish composer and pianist

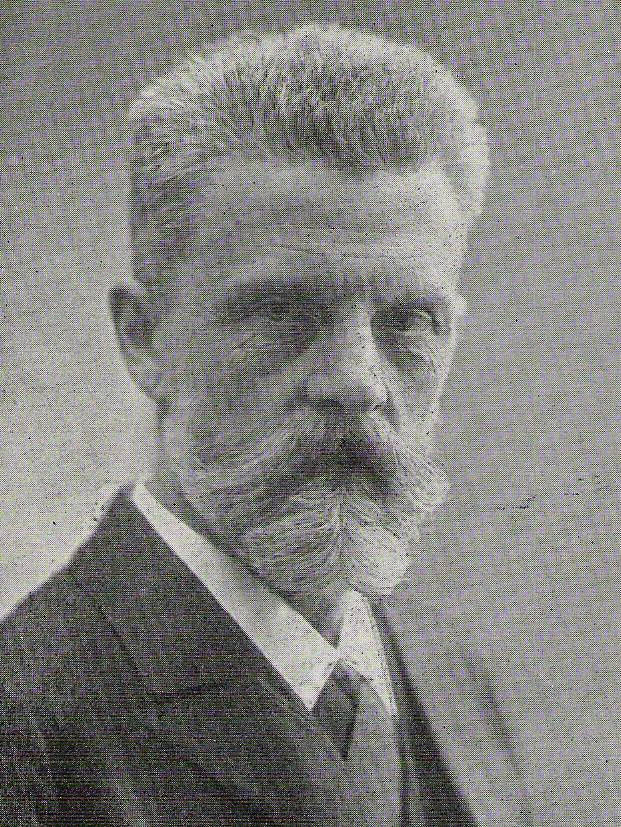

Peter Erasmus Lange-Müller (1 December 1850 – 26 February 1926) was a Danish composer and pianist. His compositional style was influenced by Danish folk music and by the work of Robert Schumann; Johannes Brahms; and his Danish countrymen, including J.P.E. Hartmann.

== Early years ==
Lange-Müller was born in Frederiksberg, Denmark to an affluent family with a background in politics. He spent his childhood painting, reading poetry, and studying music with prominent teachers, including G. Matthison-Hansen. Poor health prevented him from attending school until 1871, when he entered conservatory to study composition. After a year, however, his father decided that he should follow his professional path and enrolled him in Copenhagen University to study political science. He was not suited for a life in politics though, and by 1874 he had become fully immersed in his compositional career. It was at this time that he and several colleagues founded Copenhagen's Concert Society.

== Middle years ==
For the next quarter of a century, Lange-Müller produced a huge quantity of music, comprising some seventy-seven opus numbers. And, for several years, he conducted the Concert Society he helped to establish. However, he suffered from severe migraines (later linked to chronic eye disease), which made working at length very difficult for him. Therefore, what he could compose quickly tends to display the best of his compositional skill. Accordingly, his songs for unaccompanied voice and small chamber pieces are his most popular works. They also comprise the bulk of his musical output. Of his larger works, he completed two symphonies, a violin concerto, and an orchestral suite (In the Alhambra) which are still performed today. In 1887, he became Knight of the Order of the Dannebrog. In 1892, he married Ruth Block, with whom he had three children.

== Late years ==
After 1900, Lange-Müller composed very little. He spent most of his time in his secluded home in Sophienberg, entertaining his grandchildren. He died on 26 February 1926, four days after a serious street accident in Copenhagen.

== List of Works (incomplete) ==
Pictures From Nighttime (Piano suite ca. 1864)
- Op. 1 Sulamith and Salomon (1874)

- Op. 3 In the Alhambra (orchestral suite - 1876)
- Op. 4Three poems by Bergsøe (1875)

November Mood (ca. 1876)

- Op. 5 Choir (Tonernes flugt, Novemberstemning... 1876)
- Op. 6 Eight songs of Ingemann (Sulamith's song: Queen in the Garden, Giant's song, Sulamiths song: in breach sill, ... 1876)
- Op. 7 Tove (opera- 1878)
- Op. 8 12 piano pieces
- Op. 9 Niels Ebbesen (baritone, men's chorus, and orchestra - 1878)
- Op. 10 Twelve choir and quartet songs
- Op. 11 Songs set to texts by Thor Lange (Why leaning willow tree, Kosakken ...)
- Op. 13 I have a master named Sebald (1880 drama)
- Op. 14 Six Danish songs (At sunset, Fresh weather, Earth is sick... 1882)
- Op. 15 Fulvia (playwright)
- Op. 16 Five Norwegian Songs
- Op. 17 Symphony No. 1 in d-minor ("Autumn" - 1879/1882)
- Op. 18 Six folktales by Thor Ling (Skin from bright sunshine, willow-tree bends, Small red rowanberry ... 1882)
- Op. 19 Mood pieces from Russia (1882)
- Op. 20 Four poems by Tolstoy (An edge of the misty moors, deep in the twilight, As shadows along the sky, With the snow buried ... 1883)
- Op. 21 Three psalms (choir and orchestra, 1883)
- Op. 22 Spanish students (1883)
- Op. 23 Songs of Drachmann (1884)
- Op. 24 Songs by Ernst von der Recke
- Op. 25 Once upon a time (1887 drama)
- Op. 26 Meranerreigen (piano)
- Op. 27 Six Lieder (1885)
- Op. 28 Five French Songs
- Op. 29 Two Lieder (for mezzo-soprano, choir, and orchestra)
- Op. 30 Lady Jeanna (opera - 1891)
- Op. 31 THABOR
- Op. 32 Gildet paa Solhaug (incidental music - 1887/88), after the play by Henrik Ibsen
- Op. 33 Symphony No. 2 in d-minor (1889/1915)
- Op. 34 Eight folktales by Thor Ling (shepherd draws on his sleeve, High up in the mountains, All my love, All of the herbs are sprouting, it is the gentle summer... 1888)
- Op. 36 Three cantatas (1888) and a string quartet- Album Leaves (1889)
- Op. 38 Three Songs from Polish and Russian (In the forest I, II woods, guardian angels - 1890)
- Op. 39 Three fantasies for violin and piano (1895)
- Op. 40 Songs by Karl Gjellerup
- Op. 41 By Bosphorus (1891 drama)
- Op. 42 Peter Plus (playwright)
- Op. 43 Serenade for violin and piano (af musikken till Paul Heyes drama 'Die Schlimmen Brüder)
- Op. 44 Duchess of Burgundy (playwright)
- Op. 47 Weyerburg (orchestral suite in 1894)
- Op. 48 "Letizia" (1898 drama)
- Op. 49 Dance and intermezzi (piano pieces)
- Op. 50 Vikingeblod (opera 1900)
- Op. 53 Piano Trio in f-minor (1898)
- Op. 54 Three songs by the sea
- Op. 55 Medieval (melodrama 1896)
- Op. 56 Seven forest pieces (piano pieces)
- Op. 57 Four songs of "Cosmus" (The sun pops out as a rose, I sing about a king, ... - 1898)
- Op. 59 Renaissance (melodrama 1901)
- Op. 63 Romance for violin and orchestra (1899) (also available in a version for piano and violin)
- Op. 64 Seventeen stories and songs by Thor Ling (1899)
- Op. 65 Three Madonna songs (1900)
- Op. 66 Piano Fantasy in c-minor
- Op. 67 Prolog by English Concert Association 1 - concert (Choir and Orchestra 1902)
- Op. 68 Muted Melodies (piano pieces)
- Op. 69 Violin Concerto in C major (1904)
- Op. 71 Cantata to Hans Christian Andersen's 100th anniversary (1905)
- Op. 72 Agnete and Havmanden (choir and orchestra, 1908)
- Op. 75 Nine songs of Ernst von der Recke (1908)
- Op. 77 Wanderer songs (I walk along the path the Lord is coming up, as a subdued tone of ...)

Clock signals to the Copenhagen Town Hall (1905) Summer night at the Sound (band) In Memorian (Orchestra 1914) Lamentazione (Orchestra 1914)
