= Christen Andreas Fonnesbech =

Danish lawyer, landowner and politician (1817–1880)

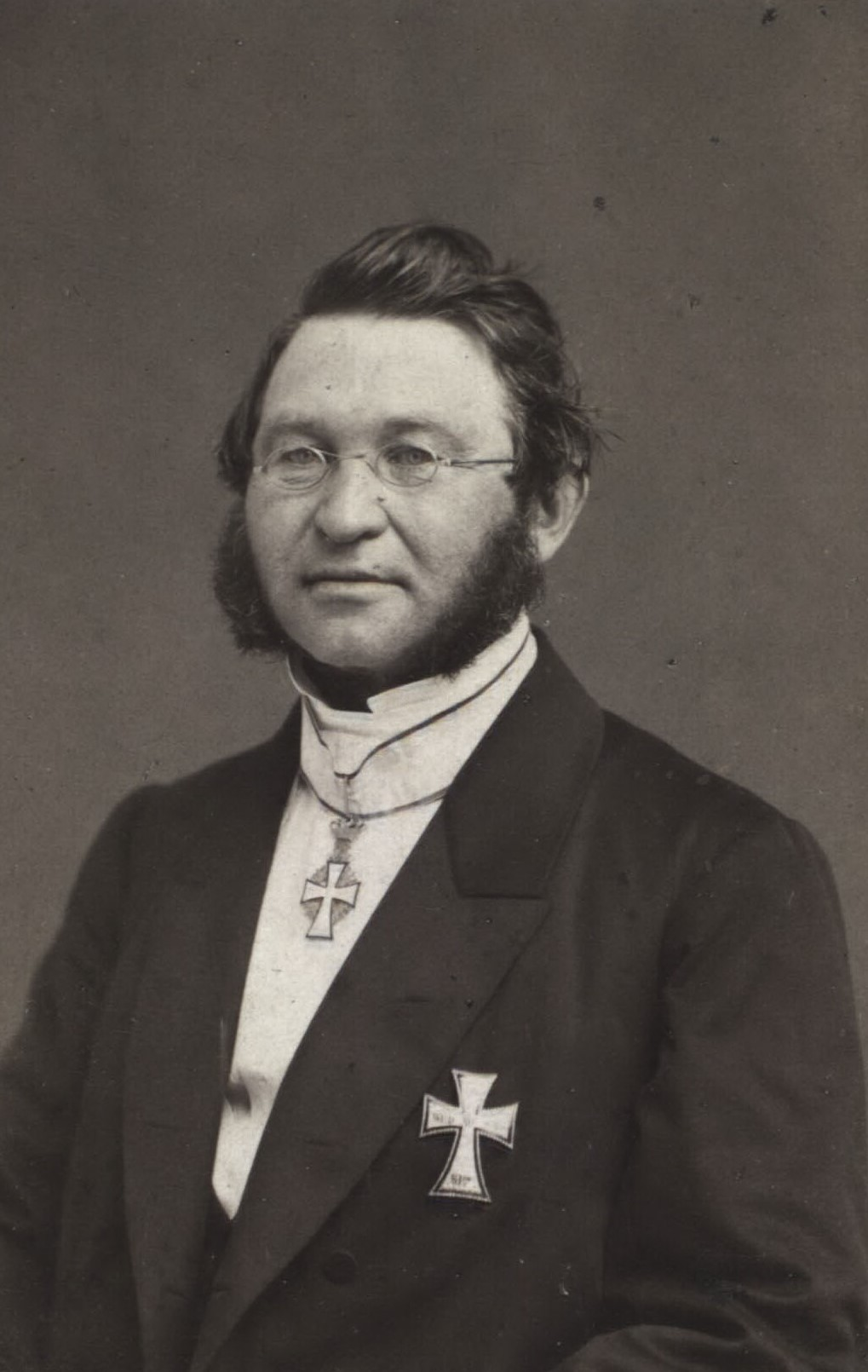

Council President of Denmark
- In office 14 July 1874 – 11 June 1875
- Monarch: Christian IX
- Preceded by: Ludvig Holstein-Holsteinborg
- Succeeded by: Jacob Brønnum Scavenius Estrup

Personal details
- Born: 7 July 1817 Copenhagen
- Died: 17 May 1880 (aged 62) Copenhagen
- Party: Højre
- Education: University of Copenhagen

Christen Andreas Fonnesbech (7 July 1817 – 17 May 1880) was a Danish lawyer, landowner and politician. He was Council President of Denmark from 1874 to 1875.

== Early life and education ==
Fonnesbech was born in Copenhagen, where his father was a dressmaker. He matriculated from Borgerdyd School in 1835 and earned a cand.jur. degree from the University of Copenhagen in 1840.

== Career ==
He began his tenure and became town clerk (byfoged) in Hillerød. In 1843 he bought the estate Vesterbygaard at Kalundborg at Holbæk. In 1845, he also bought Saltoft at Slagelse.

== Politics ==
In 1863 he acted as president of the County Council in Odense. Fonnesbech was also a member of the Folketing from 1858 to 1875.

== Awards ==
He became a Knight of the Order of the Dannebrog in 1860, Commander of the 1st Degree in 1866, received the Grand Cross in 1870, was awarded the Cross of Honour (Dannebrogsmand) in 1871, and received the Medal of Merit in Gold in 1874. In 1863, he became Knight of the Order of the Polar Star.

Political offices
Preceded by Christian Nathan David	Finance Minister of Denmark; 6 November 1865 – 28 May 1870	Succeeded by Carl Emil Fenger
Preceded by Peter Christian Kierkegaard	Kultus Minister of Denmark; 6 March 1868 – 15 March 1868	Succeeded by Aleth Hansen
Preceded by Wolfgang von Haffner	Interior Minister of Denmark; 28 May 1870 – 14 July 1874	Succeeded by Frederik Christian Heinrich Emil Tobiesen
Preceded by Ludvig Holstein-Holsteinborg	Council President of Denmark; 14 July 1874 – 11 June 1875	Succeeded by Jacob Brønnum Scavenius Estrup
Preceded by Andreas Frederik Krieger	Finance Minister of Denmark; 14 July 1874 – 11 June 1875	Succeeded by Jacob Brønnum Scavenius Estrup
