= Vesterbygaard =

Manor house in Kalundborg Municipality, Denmark

- Interactive map of the Vesterbygaard area

General information
- Location: Vesterbygårdvej 20 4490 Jerslev Sjælland, Denmark
- Coordinates: 55°36′36.7″N 11°16′35.9″E
- Construction started: 1840s
- Client: Christen Andreas Fonnesbech

Vesterbygaard (Note: A Danish spelling reform in 1948 replaced the digraph "aa" with "å" in most cases. Proper nouns, however, were allowed the option of retaining the older spelling, which is why the name of the manor house differs from the modern street name, "Vesterbygårdvej.") is a manor house and estate situated north of Tissø, Kalundborg Municipality, some 70 km west of Copenhagen, Denmark. The three-winged main building was constructed for Christen Andreas Fonnesbech in the 1840s. The estate is still owned by his descendants. The estate covers 327 hectares of farmland.

== History ==
=== Early history ===
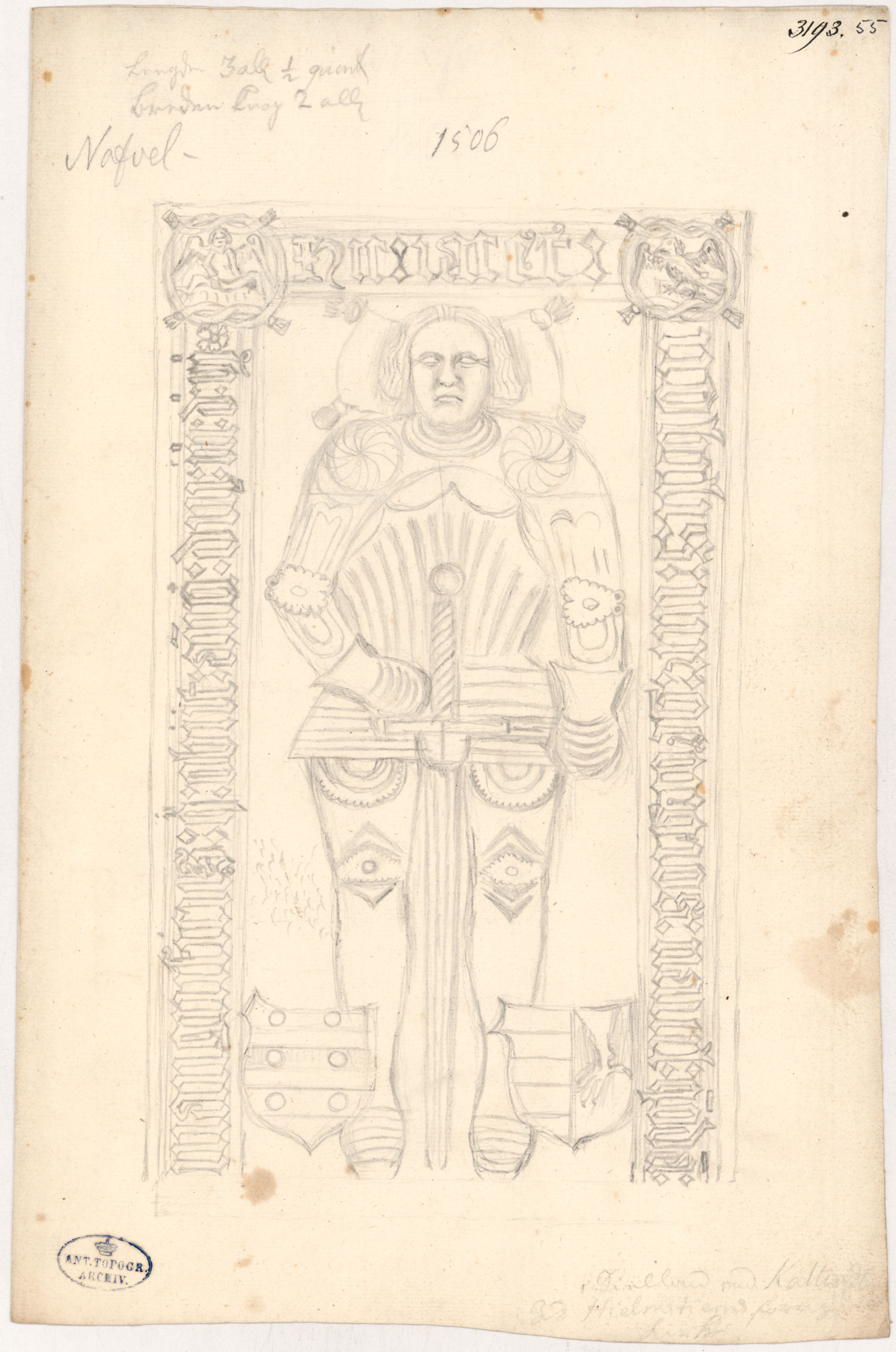
Ledgerstone of Jørgen Navl.

In the 13th-century Danish Census Book, Vesterbygaard is recorded as crown land. Its name was most likely a reference to its location in the western part of the village of Jordkøse. It was later owned by members of the Munk family. In 1354-1480, it belonged to Roskilde Bishopric.

In 1484, it was ceded to Hans Navl in exchange of property elsewhere. He was buried in Sorø Abbey Church, where his and his wife's ledgerstone can still be seen. In 1562, Jørgen Navl (son) sold the estate to Johan Friis. Shortly thereafter, he ceded it to the Crown in exchange for other land. The estate was subsequently placed under Kalundborg Fief.

=== Changing owners, 1664–1750 ===
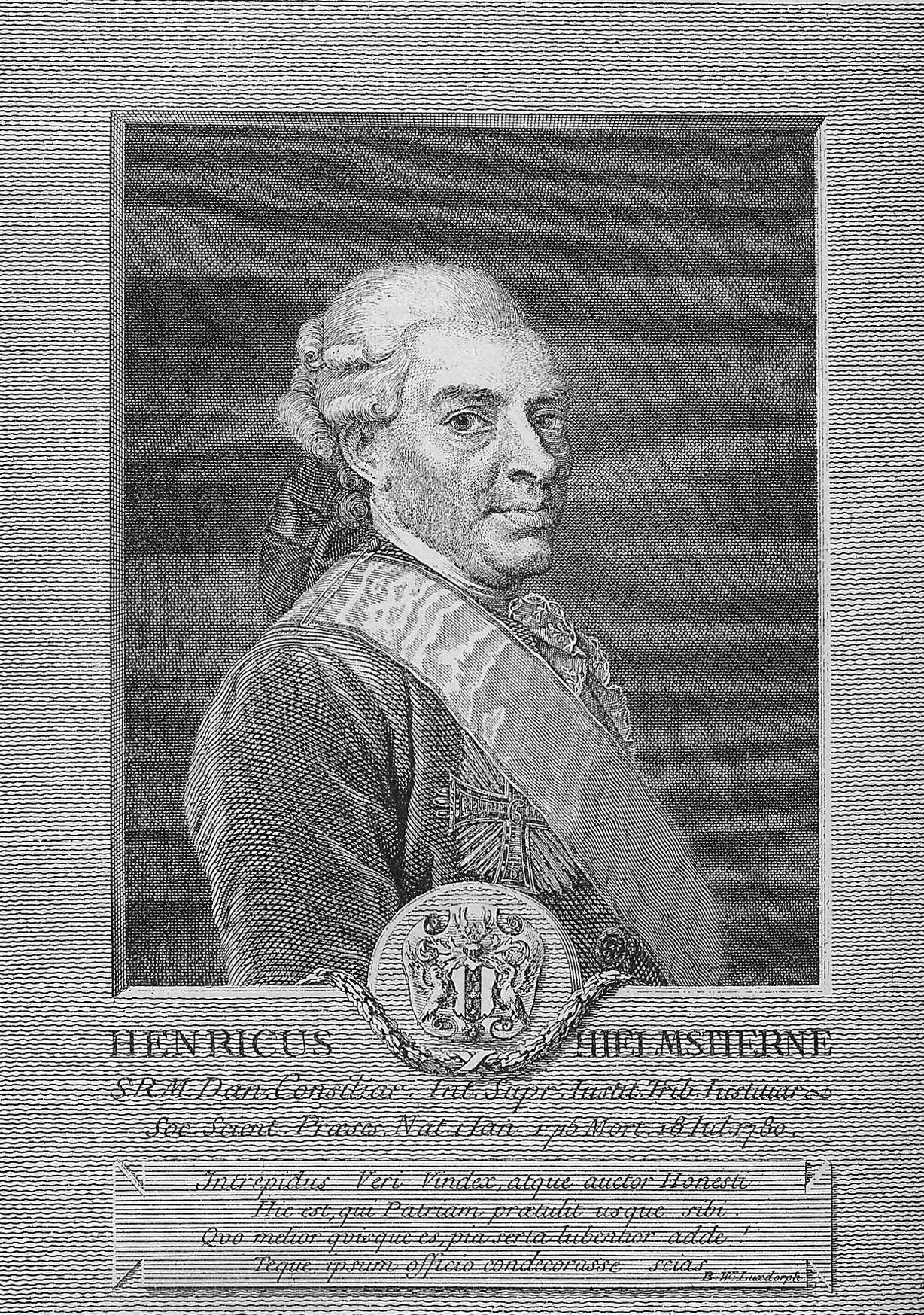
Henrik Hielmstjerne.

Denmark's many wars with Sweden throughout the 16th, 17th, and early 18th centuries left the Crown heavily in debt. In 1664, Gabriel Marselis Jr., a Dutch merchant, received Vesterbygaard and a number of other estates as repayment of the large loans he had made to the king.

In 1700, Vesterbygaard was reacquired by the Crown. In 1719, it was sold to Niels Hansen Fuglede. In the same year, it was expanded with four tenant farms. Saltoftegård was later also incorporated in the estate. In 1724, it was awarded the status of a fri sædegård).

In 1729, Fuglede sold to the Icelandic merchant Niels Henrichsen. He would later serve as deputy mayor of Kalundborg. After his death, Vesterbygaard passed to his son Henrich Henrichsen. He had studied theology at the University of Copenhagen but ended up as president of the Supreme Court. In 1747, he was ennobled under the name Hielmstierne. He had a large collection of books, which was later ceded to the Royal Danish Library where it is still referred to as the Hjelmstierne-Rosencroneske Bogsamling.

=== Lerche family, 1750–1843 ===
In 1750, Vesterbygaard was bought by Christian Lerche, the Secretary of War. In 1818, together with a number of other estates in the area, it formed the County of Lerchenborg. The two-winged, half-timbered main building was destroyed by fire in 1832.

=== Fonesbech family ===
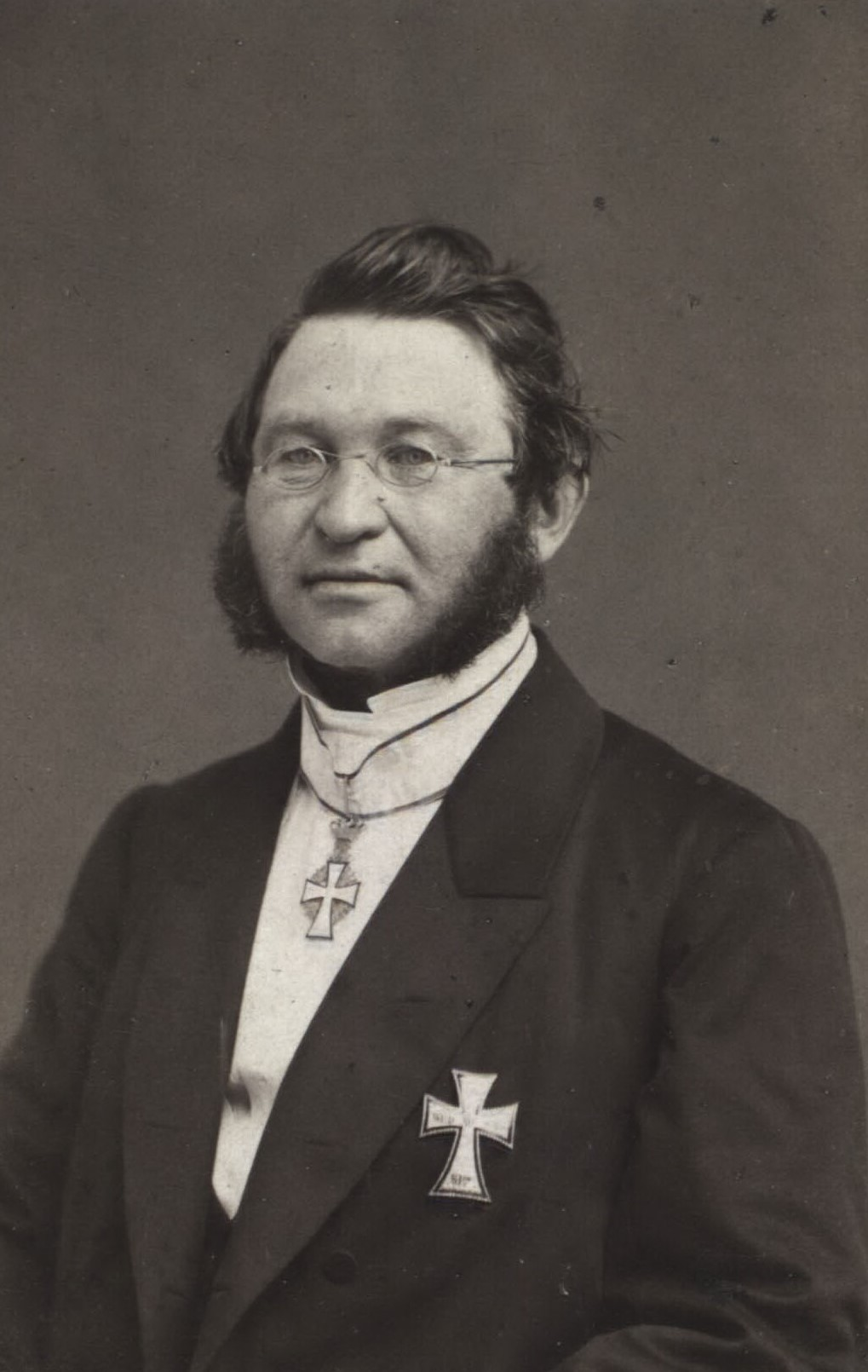
Christian Andreas Fonnesbech.

In 1843, Vesterbygaard was acquired by Christen Andreas Fonnesbech. He had just inherited a substantial sum of money from his father, a successful silk and textile merchant in Copenhagen. Fonnesbech constructed a new main building on his estate. In 1858, he was elected for the Danish parliament. He would later serve both as minister of finances and interior affairs before briefly serving as Prime Minister in 1874–1875.

Fonnesbech's widow Karen Sophie Fonnesbech (née Hauberg) kept the estate until her death in 1906. Neither of their two sons had survived childhood. Vesterbygaard was therefore endowed to her nephew Orla Wulff, who assumed the name Fonnesbech-Wulff.

Orla Fonnesbech-Wulff did not have any children. On his death Vesterbygaard therefore passed to his nephew Henry Emil Fonnesbech-Wulff. He served as minister for the electoral congregation at Vallekilde. In 1923, he was appointed as Bishop of the Diocese of Roskilde. He left Vesterbygaard to his son Orla Honnesbech-Wulff.

== Architecture ==
The main building from 1844–46 is a three-winged building. The central part of the main wing is tipped by a triangular pediment on both sides of the building (courtyard and garden). The three-winged home farm (avlsgården) is situated immediately to the north of the main building. The oldest of the three wings is a thatched, half-timbered building from 1818. The two other farm wings are constructed in brick and roofed with tile. Together, the three-winged main building and the three-winged home farm form a large rectangular complex surrounding a central courtyard.

== Today ==
The current owner of Vesterbygaard is Dorte Fonnesbech-Wulff. The estate covers 327 hectares of land of which 284 hectares is farmland, 23 hectares is woodland, and 5 hectares is parkland/garden.

== List of owners ==
- (1300-t.) Munk family
- (1354-1480) Bishops of Roskilde
- (1480-1489) Hans Navl
- (1489-1506) Jørgen Navl
- (1506-1562) Jørgen Navl Jørgensen
- (1562-1564) Johan Friis
- (1564-1664) The Crown
- (1664-1700) Gabriel Marselis
- (1700-1719) The Crown
- (1719-1729) Niels Hansen Fuglede
- (1729-1745) Niels Henrichsen
- (1745-1750) Henrich Henrichsen Hielmstierne
- (1750-1757) Christian Lerche
- (1757-1766) Amalie M. C. Leiningen-Westerburg, widow Lerche
- (1766-1804) Georg Flemming Lerche
- (1804-1850) Christian Cornelius Lerche
- (1843-1880) Christen Andreas Fonnesbech
- (1880-1907) Karen Sophie Hauberg, widow Fonnesbech
- (1907-1913) Orla Fonnesbech-Wulff
- (1913-1934) Henry Emil Fonnesbech-Wulff
- (1934-1936) Laura Elisabeth Hastrup, widow Fonnesbech-Wulff
- (1936-1970) Orla Fonnesbech-Wulff
- (1970-1997) Niels Fonnesbech-Wulff
- (1997-2002) Estate of Niels Fonnesbech-Wulff
- (2002-2021 ) Dorte Fonnesbech-Wulff Estrup & Adam Estrup
- (2021- ) Dorte Fonnesbech-Wulff
