= Sophienberg =

Building in Rungsted, Denmark

Coordinates: 55.8995°N 12.5328°E

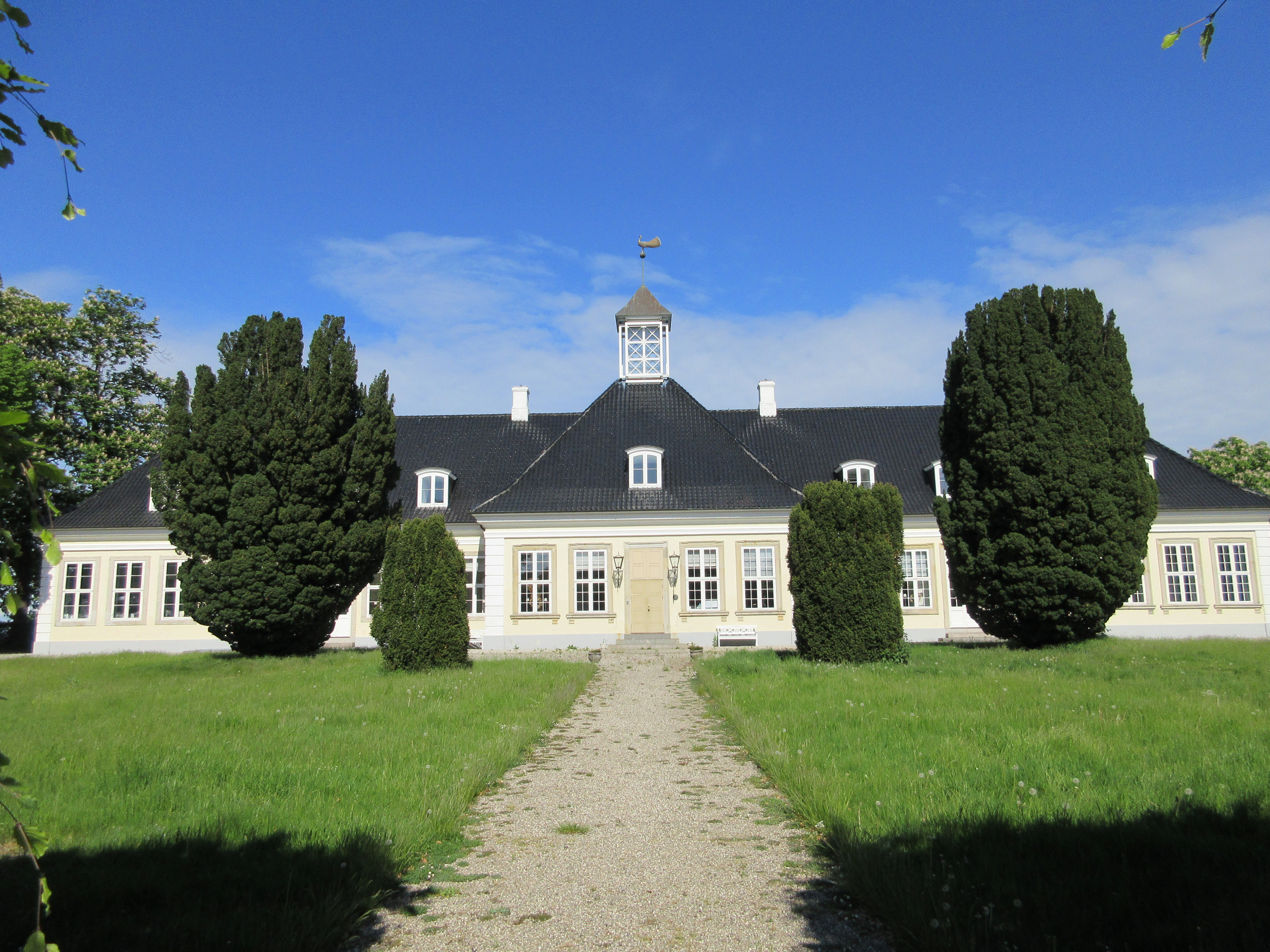
Sophienberg viewed from the garden

Sophienberg is a former royal summer retreat located on the Coast Road in Rungsted, Hørsholm Municipality, some 20 km north of central Copenhagen, Denmark. It is now operated as a venue for meetings and smaller conferences.

== History ==
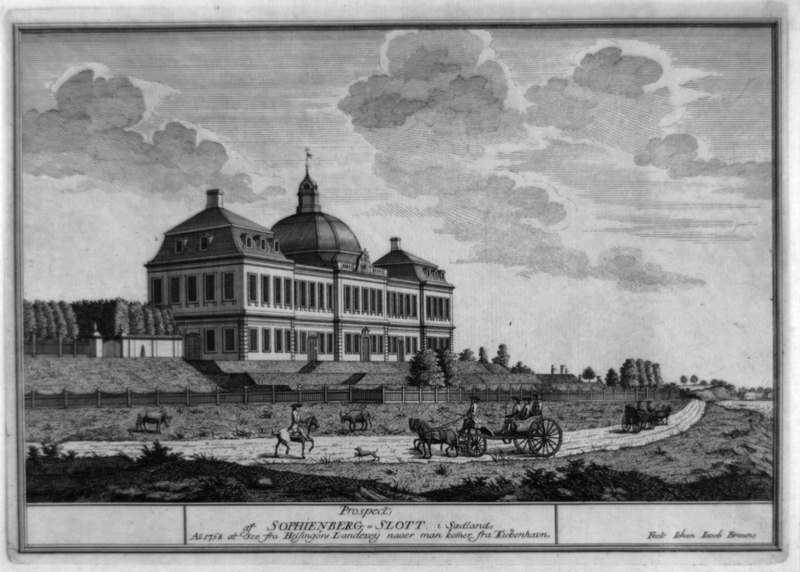
Sophienberg House in 1758 depicted by Johan Jacob Bruun

Sophienberg was built by king Christian VI and queen Sophie Magdalene. They had already almost completed the much larger Hirschholm a few kilometers away but wanted a hideaway closer to the coast from which it would be possible to enjoy the view of the water and the passing ships. Court architect Nicolai Eigtved began the construction of a small pavilion in 1742 but an expansion began immediately after its completion and the house was therefore not completed until 1746. The Baroque-style house had a five-bay avant-corps (median risalit) topped by a copper clad dome and a projecting four-bay pavilion at each end of the facade.

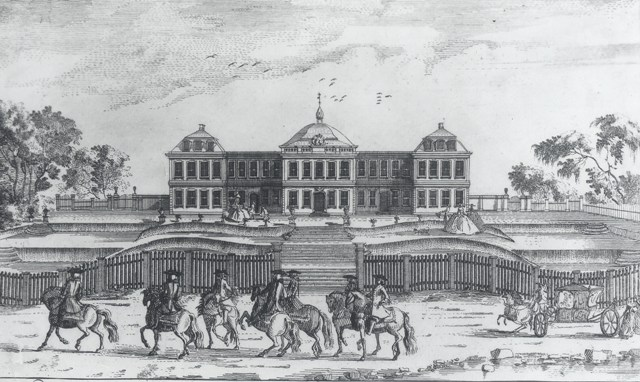
Sophienberg viewed from the road

In 1777, Sophienberg was the setting for some of the events during the affair between Struense and the queen. In 1780, Christian VII gave Sophienberg to his half-brother Frederick, who expanded the estate significantly through the acquisition of more land. Sophienberg was acquired by colonel Arnoldus von Falkenskiold in 1797. He improved the management of the land but the former royal residence was far too big for his needs and in 1808–1809 he removed the upper floor and one third of the ground floor. The surplus building materials were sold to constructors active in the rebuilding of Copenhagen following the British bombardment of the city in 1807. The house then changed hands many times over the following decades. Frederik Horsens Block purchased the property in 1872. He had returned from Hong Kong in 1845 and was also the owner of nearby Kokkedal House. Composer Peter Lange-Müller, Block's son-in-law, inherited Sophienberg in 1897 and lived there until his death in 1922. One of the couple's three daughters then took over the house which was listed in 1964.

Th new owner completed a renovation of the building in 1990. The engineer Gunner Ruben purchased it in 2006.

== List of owners ==
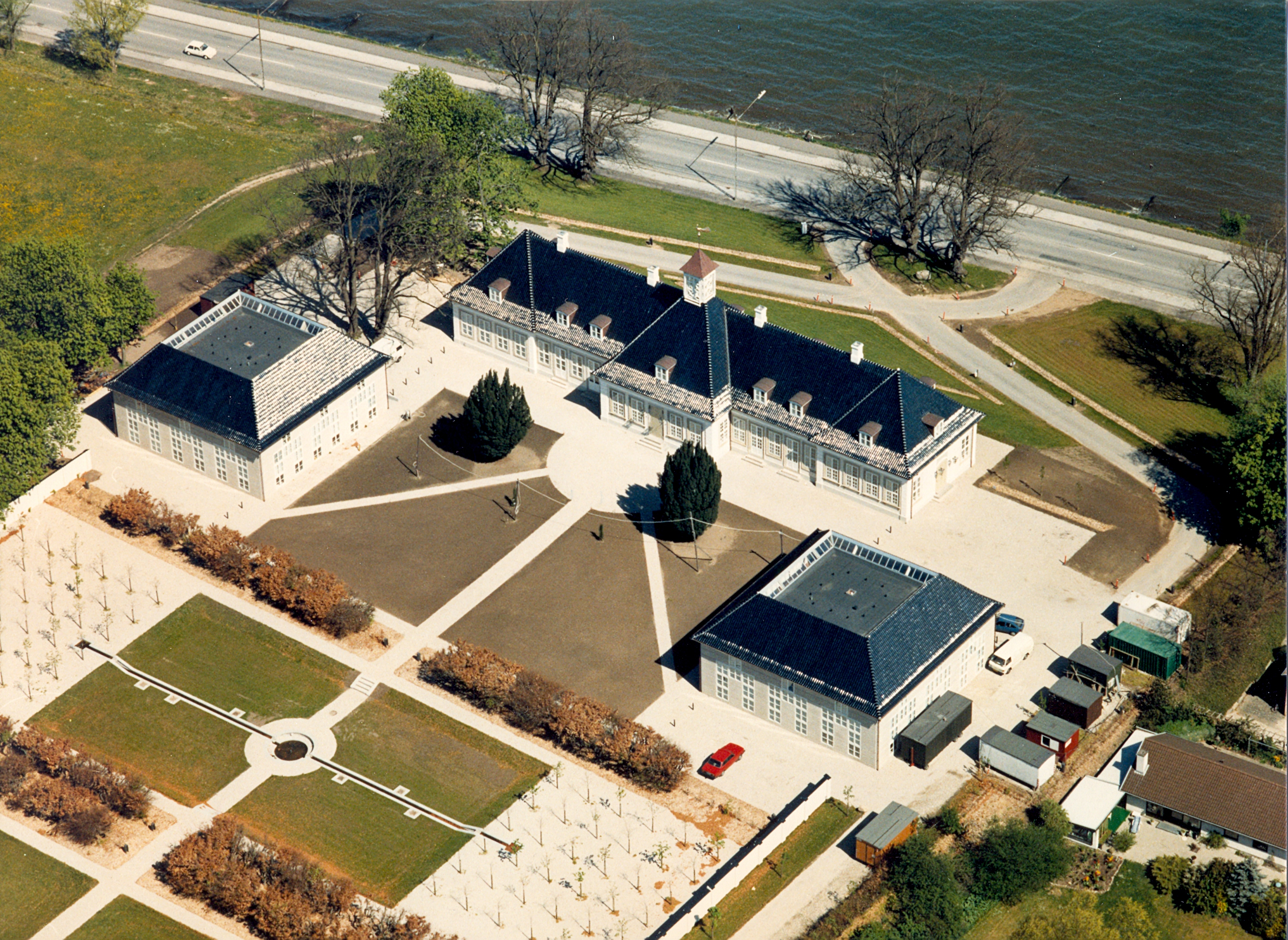
Sophienberg from the air in 2009.

- (1727–1729) Nikolaj Lambrecht
- (1729–1746) Christian VI
- (1746–1770) Queen Sophie Magdalene
- (1770–1780) Christian VII
- (1780–1790) Frederick, Hereditary Prince of Denmark
- (1790–1793) Government
- (1793–1797) Johan Thomas de Neergaard
- (1797–1819) Arnoldus von Falkenskiold
- (1819–1821) Estate of Arnoldus von Falkenskiold
- (1821–1826) Ole Sørensen
- (1826–1830) Anna Gustava Wedel-Jarlsberg
- (1830–1851) Hans Gustav von Lilienskjold
- (1851–1852) Sigismund Johan Ree
- (1852–1857) Ludwig Wulff
- (1857–1860) Waldemar Engelsted
- (1860–1872) Josias Schmidt
- (1872–1892) Frederik H. Block
- (1892–1897) Mrs. Block
- (1897–1922) P. E. Lange-Müller and wife Ruth, née Block
- (1922–1928) Irmelin Lange-Müller/Vibeke Lange-Müller/Merete Lange-Müller
- (1928–1942) Brahim Ben Hannine and wife Merete, née Lange-Müller
- (1942–1965) Merete Hannine, née Lange-Müller
- (1965–1986) Salah Ben Hannine and Vibeke Lange-Müller
- (1986–1990) Niels Thygesen & Co.
- (1990–1993) Byggeriets Realkreditfond
- (1993–2006) Gymmasieskolernes Lærerforening
- (2006–2016) Gunner Ruben
- (2016–) ELF Development
