= Sæbygaard, Kalundborg Municipality =

Manor house near Kalundborg, Denmark

Sæbygård
- Interactive map of the Sæbygård area

General information
- Location: Kalundborg Municipality, Denmark
- Coordinates: 55°33′15.7″N 11°19′51.7″E

Sæbygaard is a manor house and estate situated east of Tissø, between Sæby and Ruds Vedby, in Kalundborg Municipality, some 90 km west of Copenhagen, Denmark. From 1772 to 1793, it was administrated as its own county (Danish: Amt).

== History ==
=== Early history ===
Sæbygaard traces its history back to at least the 13th century. The first known owner of the estate was Esbern Snare, Bishop Absalon's brother. Allegedly, Snare died when he fell down a staircase in the building. Not much else is known about the early history of the estate.

=== Crown land, 1379–1664 ===
In 1379. Sæbygaard was acquired by Margrethe I. For the next almost 300 years, Sæbygaard was operated as a royal fief, either independently or as part of Kalundborg Fief (Kalundborg Len). The identity of 23 fief holders are known.

=== Sæbygaard County, 1662–1793 ===
When fiefs were replaced by counties (Danish: Amter), in 1662, Sæbygaard was incorporated as its own county (Sæbbygaard Amt), which consisted only of a single hundred, Løve Herred, whose thingstead was located in the small town of Løve. In 1681, Løve Herred's thingstead relocated to Sæbygaard. In 1751, it was moved back to Løve.

=== Changing owners, 1644–1797 ===
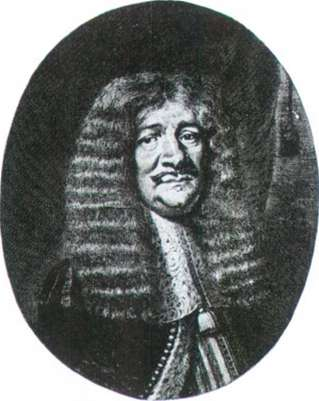
Henrik Müller by Albert Haelwegh

In the early 1660s, Henrik Müller, who had just been appointed as royal treasurer, was given all crown land in Dragsholm and Sæbygaard counties by Frederik III as partial repayment for his extensive loans to the crown during the Second Northern War. At the peak of his career, Müller was one of the largest landowners on Zealand. In 1662–1671, he served as county governor of Sæbygaard and Dragsholm counties.

In the 1670s, when he was hit by economic difficulties, partly due to an agricultural crisis, he had to pawn Sæbygaard to the Hamburg-based Jewish merchant Manuel Texeira. In 1782, Texeira became the owner of the property. After a few years, Sæbygaard was acquired by Johannes Fincke (1635-1707), who was married to Müller's daughter Sophie (1646-1718). Fincke's brother, Thomas Fincke, who was married to one of Müller's other daughters, Drude Müller (1644-1704), owned Lejregård at Roskilde. After Fincke's death, Sæbygaard was sold by his two daughters to Frederik Christian Adeler. Adeler was the son of Admiral Cort Adeler and the father of Frederik Adeler. After just one year, Adeler passed Sæbygaard to his son-in-law, Lars Benzon. After Benzon's death, some 20 years later, Sæbygaard was passed to his son Niels Benzon.

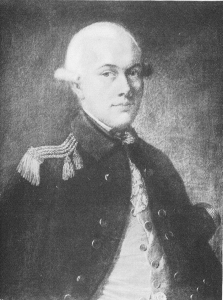
Arnoldus von Falkenskiold.

In 1761, Sæbygaard was acquired by Sophie Hedevig Rantzau. Her second husband, Christian Frederik von Levetzau, who had constructed one of the four Amalienborg mansions, had died in 1756. In 1770, she constructed a new main building on the Sæbygaard estate. Neither of her two marriages produced any children, after her death therefore, the estate was passed down to her relative Frederik Sophus Rantzau.

The next owner of the estate was Arnoldus von Falkenskiold, a former army officer with the rank of colonel. He turned the farm Falkenhøj into a separate manor in 1787, and in 1790, he also detached another manor, which was given the name Frihedslund (lit. "Liberty Grove"). Falkenskiold had a profound interest in the management of his estates and was a keen supporter of the great agricultural reforms of the time. He was the first farmer in Denmark to import British pigs. He contributed to a number of agricultural journals of his day. In 1797, he sold Sæbygaard and acquired Sophienberg at Hørsholm.

=== 19th century ===
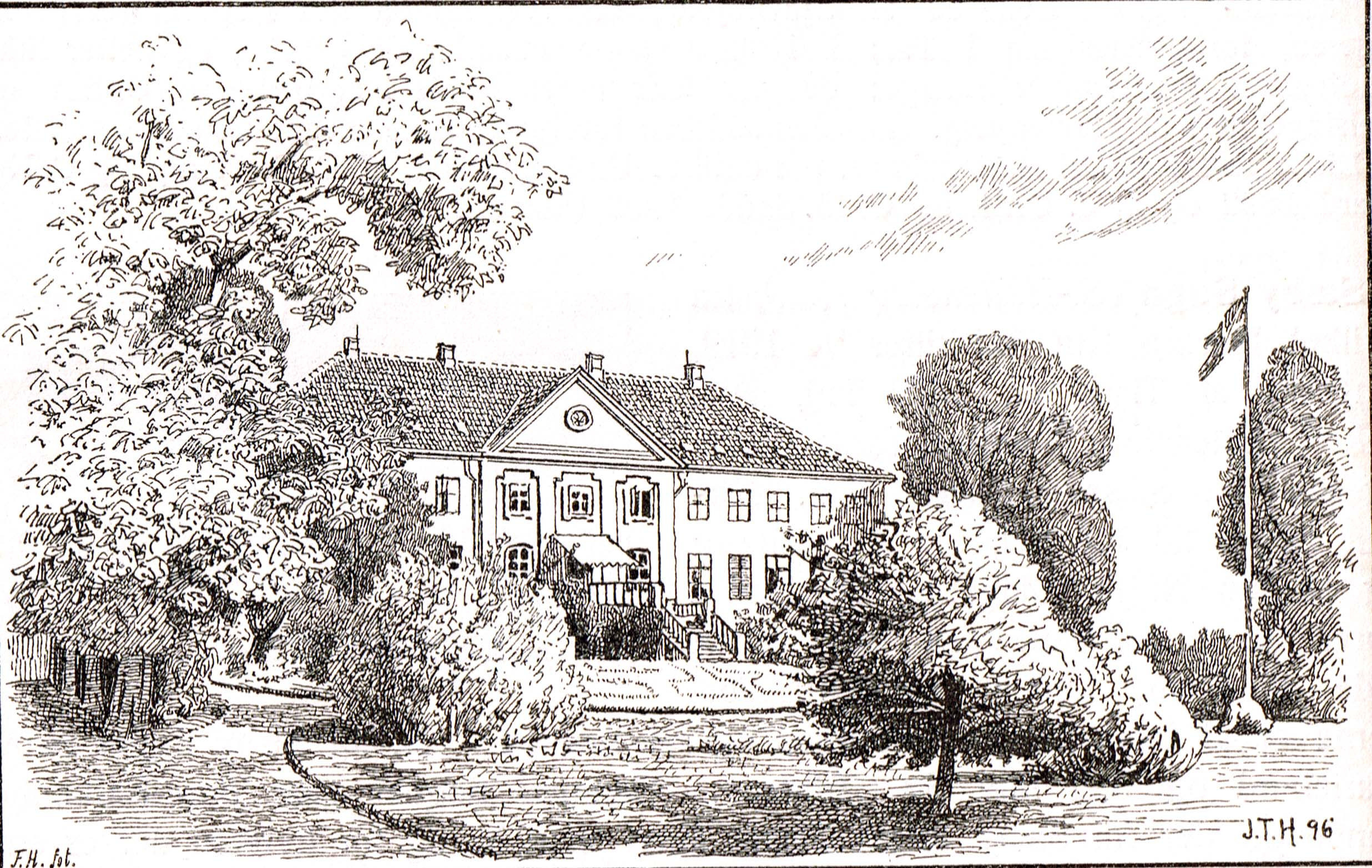
Sæbygaard in the late 19th century.

In the 19th century, Sæbygaard changed hands many times. The owners included Christian Ditlev Carl Rantzau, Haagen Christian Astrup and Frederik Hoppe.

=== 20th century ===
In 1908, Sæbygaard was acquired by Thor Gustav Emil Grüner. It was later passed down to his son Thor Gustav Emil Grüner Jr. and nephew Mogens Thomas Ludvig Gustav Grüner. In 1961, it was acquired by Torben H.W. Dahl. The main building was destroyed by fire in 1972. A new main building was subsequently constructed. In 1996, Else W. Lehmann bought Sæbygaard.

== Cultural references ==
Part of the action is set at Sæbygaard in Bernhard Severin Ingemann's 1838 historic novel Valdemar Sejr.

== List of owners ==
- (?-1204) Esbern Snare
- (1370-1379) Albert Pedersen Brok
- (1379-1664) The Crown
- (1664-1682) Henrik Müller
- (1682-1688) Manuel Texeira
- (1688-1708) Johannes Fincke
- (1708-1719)[Drude Johansdatter Fincke / Sophie Johansdatter Fincke
- (1719-1720) Frederik Christian Adeler
- (1720-1741) Lars Benzon
- (1741-1761) Niels Benzon
- (1761-1772) Sophie Hedevig Rantzau gift (1) Skeel (2) Levetzau
- (1772-1779) Frederik Sophus Rantzau
- (1779-1785) Arnoldus von Falkenskiold
- (1785-1786) Henrik Bolten
- (1786-1797) Arnoldus von Falkenskiold
- (1797-1799) Joachim Barner Paasche
- (1799-1799) Christian Ditlev Carl Rantzau
- (1799-1806) Haagen Christian Astrup
- (1806-1821) Frederik Hoppe
- (1821-1836) Christian A. Lerche
- (1836-1877) Julius Busch
- (1877-1881) Enke Fru Busch
- (1881-1908) A.E.V. Nygaard
- (1908-1911) Gustav Elias Grüner
- (1911-1913)[Thor Gustav Emil Grüner
- (1913-1961) Mogens Thomas Ludvig Gustav Grüner
- (1961-1996) Torben H.W. Dahl
- (1996-) Else W. Lehmann
