= Herluf Zahle =

Danish diplomat (1873–1941)

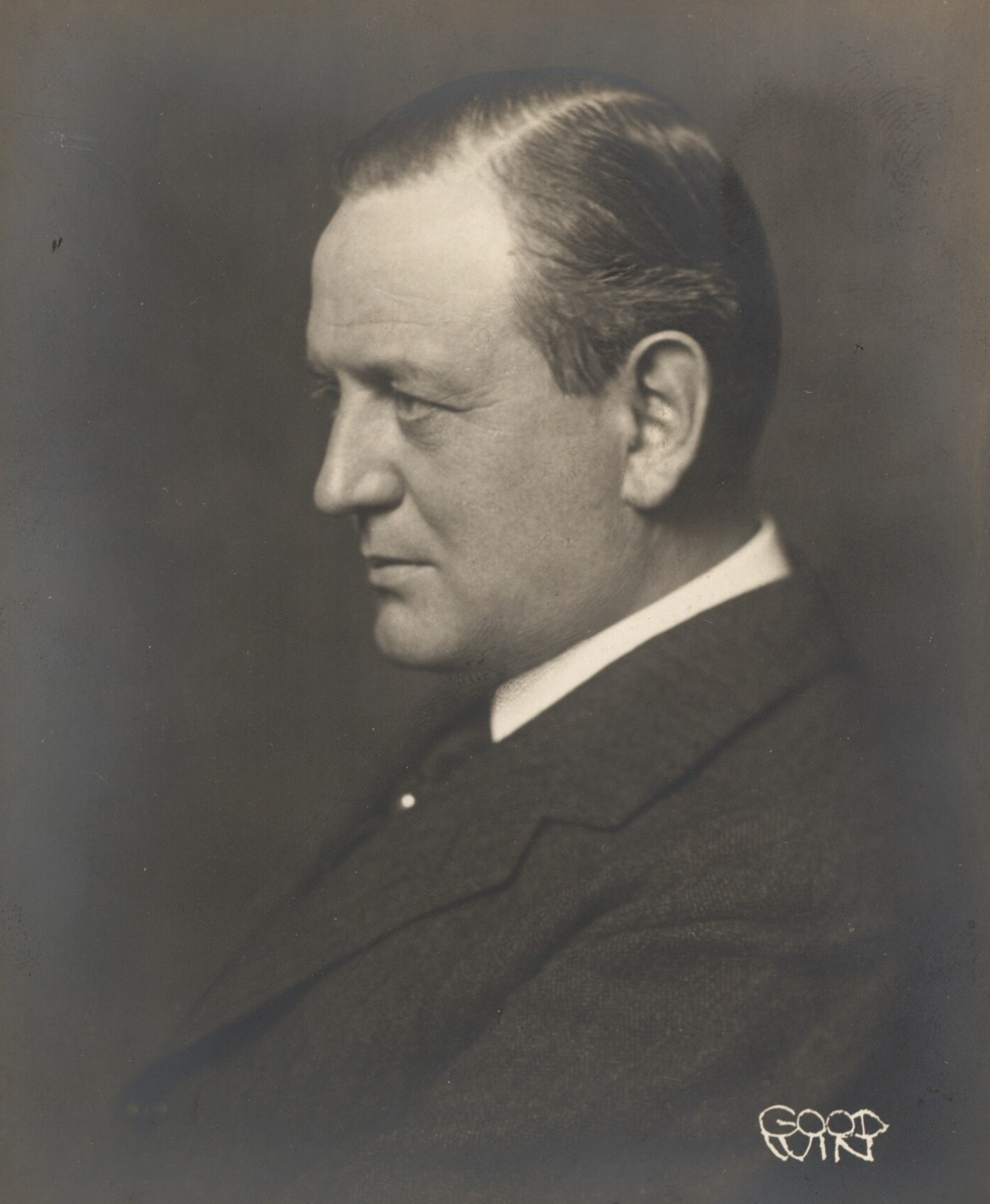
- Zahle in 1928

Danish Ambassador to Sweden
- In office 1919–1924
- Succeeded by: Erik Scavenius

President of the Assembly of the League of Nations
- In office 1928–1929
- Preceded by: Alberto Guani
- Succeeded by: José Gustavo Guerrero

Danish Ambassador to Germany
- In office 1924–1941
- Preceded by: Carl Moltke

Personal details
- Born: 14 March 1873 Copenhagen, Denmark
- Died: 4 May 1941 (aged 68) Berlin, Nazi Germany
- Resting place: Vestre Cemetery
- Education: Metropolitanskolen, University of Copenhagen
- Awards: Dannebrogordenens Hæderstegn (1912); Medal of Merit (Denmark) (1928); Grand Cross of the Order of the Dannebrog (1933)

Herluf Zahle (14 March 1873 – 4 May 1941) was a Danish diplomat and President of the Assembly of the League of Nations from 1928–1929. He led the diplomatic missions of Denmark in Sweden from 1919–1924 and Germany from 1924–1941.

As a diplomat to Nazi Germany, Zahle supported Denmarks cautious neutrality at the outbreak of World War II. He raised increasing concerns of an invasion, including a series of urgent correspondence the week before the German invasion of Denmark. He continued to work in Berlin until his death in 1941.

== Personal life ==
Herluf Zahle was born in Copenhagen on 14 March 1873 to Anna M.C. Knudsen (1842–1937) and Frederik Zahle (1842–1930). His father, Frederik, was a lawyer who later worked for the Danish Supreme Court. He graduated from Metropolitanskolen in 1890 and was awarded a Cand.jur. from the University of Copenhagen in 1897.

On 24 August 1901, he married Hedvig Maren Sophie Hauge in Ordrup. Zahle died in Berlin on 4 May 1941 and was buried at Vestre Cemetery in Copenhagen.

Zahle was made a chamberlain in 1910. He was awarded the Dannebrogordenens Hæderstegn in 1912 and the Medal of Merit in 1928. In 1906, he was made a member of the Order of the Dannebrog, eventually being granted the title of Grand Cross within the order in 1933.

== Career ==
After graduating from the University of Copenhagen, Zahle worked as a legal assistant. In 1900, he became employed in the Ministry of Foreign Affairs. He was a legal secretary in Paris in 1904, in Stockholm from 1905 to 1908, and in London from 1908. During this period he was secretary to the Danish delegation at the Hague Convention of 1907.

In 1909, he returned to Denmark and was appointed head of the department within the ministry. He was promoted to head of the ministry's second department the next year. In 1913, he was made head of the ministry's first department, which was primarily a concerned with political matters. That year, he was designated as chairman of the Danish delegation to the Third Hague Conference, which did not succeed due to the outbreak of World War I. During the war, Zahle frequently came into conflict with the Minister of Foreign Affairs, Erik Scavenius. From Scavenius' perspective, Zahle was far too concerned with matters of etiquette and decorum. After the war ended, Zahle became the envoy to Sweden in Stockholm, a position he held from 1919 to 1924. While there, he became close to the Swedish monarchy and the Swedish nobility.

In 1924, his post was taken over by Scevenius, and Zahle was transferred to Berlin where he was envoy to the Weimar Republic. In Germany in 1925, Zahle also conducted an investigation into reports of the survival of Grand Duchess Anastasia Nikolaevna of Russia at the request of Maria Feodorovna and Prince Valdemar of Denmark. Although these reports proved to be false, he found them convincing. He was seen as a sympathiser by Anna Anderson, Anastasia's imposter, and supported her through her hospital stays on behalf of Prince Valdemar. Zahle amassed a large amount of information about Anderson, though his evidence has controversially never been released to the public by the Danish Monarchy.

Zahle (left) acting as president at the League of Nations in 1928, photographed by Erich Salomon

While working as a diplomat, he was also the chairman of the Danish delegations to the League of Nations from 1920 to 1927. In 1925, he became president of the Second International Opium Convention. In 1928, he was made president of the League of Nations, a role which he held for one year. In the 1930s, he presided as an ad hoc judge over the Eastern Greenland Case.

Because of his work outside of Germany during this 1920s and 1930s, he was forced to neglect his role in Berlin. When he returned there in 1933, many of his old contacts had either disappeared or emigrated. His reports back to Denmark expressed increasing concern about the foreign relations of Nazi Germany. In June 1939, Zahle was coerced by Joachim von Ribbentrop to sign a non-aggression pact with Germany on behalf of Denmark when the Minister of Foreign Affairs, Peter Rochegune Munch, refused to travel to Berlin.

Zahle and Estonian diplomat Karl Menning being driven at the 1933 Nuremberg rally

Following the outbreak of World War II, he supported the Danish Government's stance of neutrality, but raised increasing concern that Denmark might be invaded. Between 31 March and 8 April 1940, he reported on evidence his staff had collected that an occupation of Denmark was being planned. On 4 April, Zahle heard word via Hans Oster that an invasion would be launched on 9 April, a month earlier than anticipated, and immediately sent word to Copenhagen. The next day, his correspondence abrubtly changed in tone. Zahle claimed that a German advance would only be an act of provocation, not a full-scale invasion. It is suspected that the government in Germany was either misleading Zahle's delegation or otherwise interfering with their communications back to Denmark.

On 9 April 1940, Denmark was invaded. In July 1940, he was sent to Copenhagen to prepare a declaration to the Foreign Office of Germany, which was then delivered on 17 July 1940. Although he continued to work as a diplomat in Germany after the invasion, he did not play a prominent role in the year before his death.
