= List of foreign ministers in 1950 =

This is a list of foreign ministers in 1950.

== Africa ==
Flag	Country	Foreign minister	Term
(Egypt)	Egypt	Hussein Sirri Pasha; Muhammad Salah al-Din Bey	1949-1950; 1950-1952
(Ethiopia)	Ethiopia	Aklilu Habte-Wold	1943-1958
(Liberia)	Liberia	Gabriel Lafayette Dennis	1944-1953
(South Africa)	South Africa	Daniel François Malan	1948-1954

== Asia-Pacific ==
Flag	Country	Foreign minister	Term
(Kingdom of Afghanistan)	Afghanistan	Ali Mohammad Khan	1938-1952
(Australia)	Australia	Percy Spender	1949-1951
(Myanmar)	Burma	E Maung; Sao Hkun Hkio	1949-1950; 1950-1958
(Dominion of Ceylon)	Ceylon	D.S. Senanayake	1948-1952
(China)	China (People's Republic of China)	Zhou Enlai	1949-1958
(India)	India	Jawaharlal Nehru	1947-1964
(Indonesia)	Indonesia	Mohammad Hatta; Mohammad Roem	1949-1950; 1950-1951
(Iran)	Iran	Hossein Navab	1946-1951
(Iraq)	Iraq	Muzahim al-Pachachi; Tawfiq al-Suwaidi; Shakir al-Wadi	1949-1950; 1950; 1950-1951
(Israel)	Israel	Moshe Sharett	1948-1956
(Japan)	Japan (under occupation)	Shigeru Yoshida	1948-1954
(Jordan)	Jordan	Samir al-Rifai; Muhammad ash-Shuraiki; Ruhi Abdul Hadi; Samir al-Rifai	1949-1950; 1950; 1950; 1950-1951
(North Korea)	North Korea	Pak Hon-yong	1948-1953
(South Korea)	South Korea	Yim Byeong-sik	1949-1951
(Laos)	Laos (associated state of France)	Prince Boun Oum; Phoui Sananikone	1948-1950; 1950-1951
(Lebanon)	Lebanon	Philippe Takla	1949-1951
(Mongolia)	Mongolia	Khorloogiin Choibalsan; Nantayshiriyn Lkhamsüren	1939-1950; 1950-1953
	Muscat and Oman	?	?
	Nepal	Mohan Shamsher Jang Bahadur Rana	1948-1951
(New Zealand)	New Zealand	Frederick Doidge	1949-1951
(Pakistan)	Pakistan	Sir Muhammad Zafarullah Khan	1947-1954
(Philippines)	Philippines	Joaquín Miguel Elizalde; Carlos P. Romulo	1948-1950; 1950-1952
(Saudi Arabia)	Saudi Arabia	Prince Faisal bin Abdulaziz Al-Saud	1930-1960
(Syria)	Syria	Nazim al-Kudsi	1950-1951
(Taiwan)	Taiwan (Republic of China)	George Yeh	1949-1958
(Thailand)	Thailand	Pote Sarasin; Warakan Bancha	1949-1950; 1950-1952
(North Vietnam)	North Vietnam	Hoàng Minh Giám	1946-1954
(South Vietnam)	South Vietnam	Nguyễn Phan Long; Trần Văn Hữu	1949-1950; 1950-1952
(Yemen)	Yemen	Ahmad bin Yahya	1948-1955

== Europe ==
Flag	Country	Foreign minister	Term
(Albania)	Albania	Enver Hoxha	1946-1953
(Austria)	Austria (under Allied occupation)	Karl Gruber	1945-1953
(Belgium)	Belgium	Paul van Zeeland	1949-1954
(Bulgaria)	Bulgaria	Vladimir Poptomov; Mincho Neychev	1949-1950; 1950-1956
(Czechoslovakia)	Czechoslovakia	Vladimír Clementis; Viliam Široký	1948-1950; 1950-1953
(Denmark)	Denmark	Gustav Rasmussen; Ole Bjørn Kraft	1945-1950; 1950-1953
(East Germany)	East Germany	Georg Dertinger	1949-1953
(Finland)	Finland	Carl Enckell; Åke Gartz	1944-1950; 1950-1951
(France)	France	Robert Schuman	1948-1953
(Greece)	Greece	Konstantinos Tsaldaris; Panagiotis Pipinelis; Sofoklis Venizelos; Nikolaos Plastiras; Sofoklis Venizelos	1946-1950; 1950; 1950; 1950; 1950-1951
(Hungary)	Hungary	Gyula Kállai	1949-1951
(Iceland)	Iceland	Bjarni Benediktsson	1947-1953
(Republic of Ireland)	Ireland	Seán MacBride	1948-1951
(Italy)	Italy	Carlo Sforza	1947-1951
(Liechtenstein)	Liechtenstein	Alexander Frick	1945-1962
(Luxembourg)	Luxembourg	Joseph Bech	1926-1959
(Netherlands)	Netherlands	Dirk Stikker	1948-1952
(Norway)	Norway	Halvard Lange	1946-1963
(Poland)	Poland	Zygmunt Modzelewski	1947-1951
(Portugal)	Portugal	José Caeiro da Mata; Paulo Cunha	1947-1950; 1950-1956
(Romania)	Romania	Ana Pauker	1947-1952
(San Marino)	San Marino	Gino Giacomini	1945-1957
(Soviet Union)	Soviet Union	Andrey Vyshinsky	1949-1953
(Spain)	Spain	Alberto Martín-Artajo	1945-1957
(Sweden)	Sweden	Östen Undén	1945-1962
(Switzerland)	Switzerland	Max Petitpierre	1945-1961
(Turkey)	Turkey	Necmettin Sadak; Mehmet Fuat Köprülü	1947-1950; 1950-1955
(United Kingdom)	United Kingdom	Ernest Bevin	1945-1951
(Vatican City)	Vatican City	Domenico Tardini	1937-1953
(Socialist Federal Republic of Yugoslavia)	Yugoslavia	Edvard Kardelj	1948-1953

== Americas ==
Flag	Country	Foreign minister	Term
(Argentina)	Argentina	Hipólito Jesús Paz	1949-1951
(Brazil)	Brazil	Raul Fernandes	1946-1951
(Bolivia)	Bolivia	Alberto Saavedra Nogales; Pedro Zilveti Arce	1949-1950; 1950-1951
(Canada)	Canada	Lester B. Pearson	1948-1957
(Chile)	Chile	Germán Ignacio Riesco; Horacio Walker Larraín	1948-1950; 1950-1951
(Colombia)	Colombia	Elíseo Arango Ramos; Evaristo Sourdis Juliao; Gonzalo Restrepo Jaramillo	1949-1950; 1950; 1950-1951
(Costa Rica)	Costa Rica	Ricardo Toledo Escalante; Mario Echandi Jiménez	1949-1950; 1950-1952
(Cuba)	Cuba	Carlos Hevia; Ernesto Dihigo	1948-1950; 1950-1951
(Dominican Republic)	Dominican Republic	Virgilio Díaz Ordóñez	1947-1953
(Ecuador)	Ecuador	Neftalí Ponce Miranda	1948-1952
(El Salvador)	El Salvador	Miguel Rafael Urquia; Robert Edmundo Canessa	1948-1950; 1950-1955
(Guatemala)	Guatemala	Ismael González Arévalo	1949-1951
(Haiti)	Haiti	Vilfort Beauvoir; Antoine Levelt	1949-1950; 1950-1951
(Honduras)	Honduras	Edgardo Valenzuela	1948-1954
(Mexico)	Mexico	Jaime Torres Bodet	1946-1951
(Nicaragua)	Nicaragua	Oscar Sevilla Sacasa	1949-1956
(Panama)	Panama	Carlos Brin	1949-1951
(Paraguay)	Paraguay	Bernardo Ocampos	1949-1952
(Peru)	Peru	Ernesto Rodríguez; Manuel C. Gallagher	1949-1950; 1950-1952
(United States)	United States	Dean Acheson	1949-1953
(Uruguay)	Uruguay	César Charlone; Alberto Domínguez Cámpora	1949-1950; 1950-1952
(Venezuela)	Venezuela	Luis Emilio Gómez Ruiz	1948-1952
