= John Christmas Møller =

Danish politician

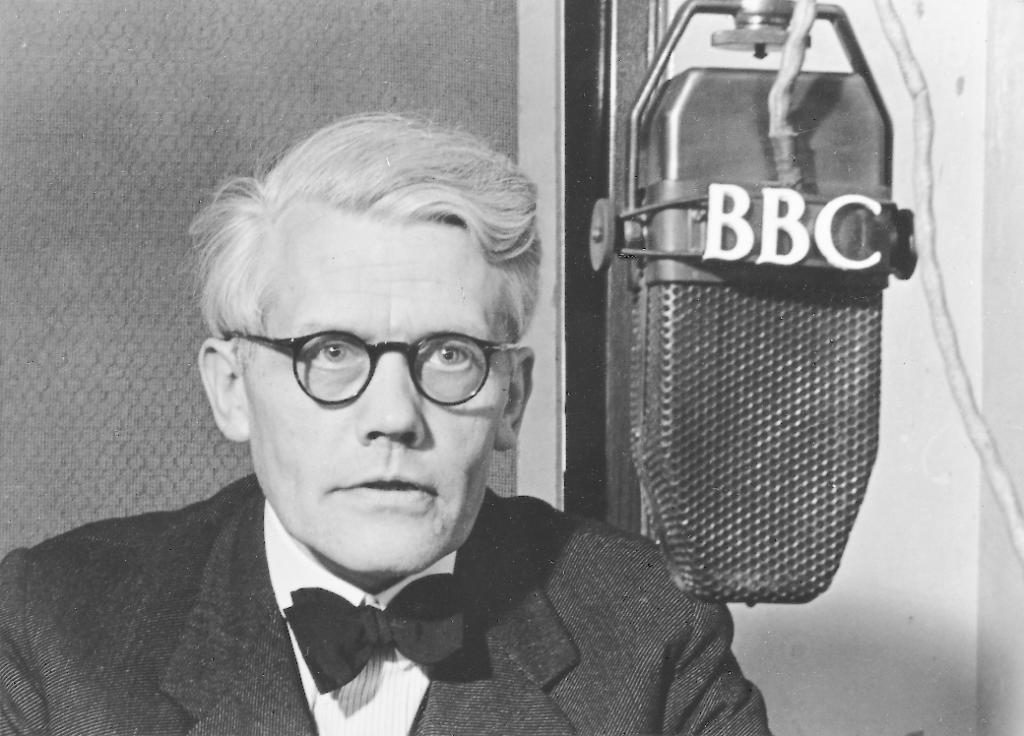
- John Christmas Møller broadcasting in Danish for British Broadcasting Corporation (BBC) for his fellow citizens in occupied Denmark during World War II.

Minister of Foreign Affairs
- In office 7 May 1945 – 7 November 1945
- Prime Minister: Vilhelm Buhl
- Preceded by: German military rule (Erik Scavenius (last previous office holder))
- Succeeded by: Ole Bjørn Kraft

Personal details
- Born: 3 April 1894 Copenhagen, Denmark
- Died: 13 April 1948 (aged 54) Copenhagen, Denmark
- Party: Conservative People's Party.

Guido Leo John Christmas Møller, usually known as Christmas Møller (3 April 1894 in Copenhagen – 13 April 1948 in Copenhagen) was a Danish politician representing the Conservative People's Party.

== Life ==
Møller was elected as a Conservative member of the Folketing and in 1928 became leader of his party, a role he still held at the beginning of the Second World War. After the German occupation of Denmark, he joined a coalition cabinet, but in October 1940, following German pressure, he was forced to resign from the government, as the German authorities felt he was too negative towards them. Three months later, in 1941, he was forced to abandon his seat in parliament altogether for the same reason. He was then instrumental in founding the underground newspaper Frit Danmark.

In 1942, Møller fled with his family to England, where he hoped to become part of a Danish government in exile. However, his most important role in London proved to be as a broadcaster for BBC Radio's Danish language service aimed at occupied Denmark. He spoke out against the Danish government's collaborative stance towards the Germans and encouraged sabotage and other resistance activities, becoming enormously popular as a result.

On 2 October 1943, an article by Christmas Møller appeared in Frit Danmark which urged all Danes to do what they could to help their Jewish fellow citizens who had gone into hiding from the Nazis' planned roundup.

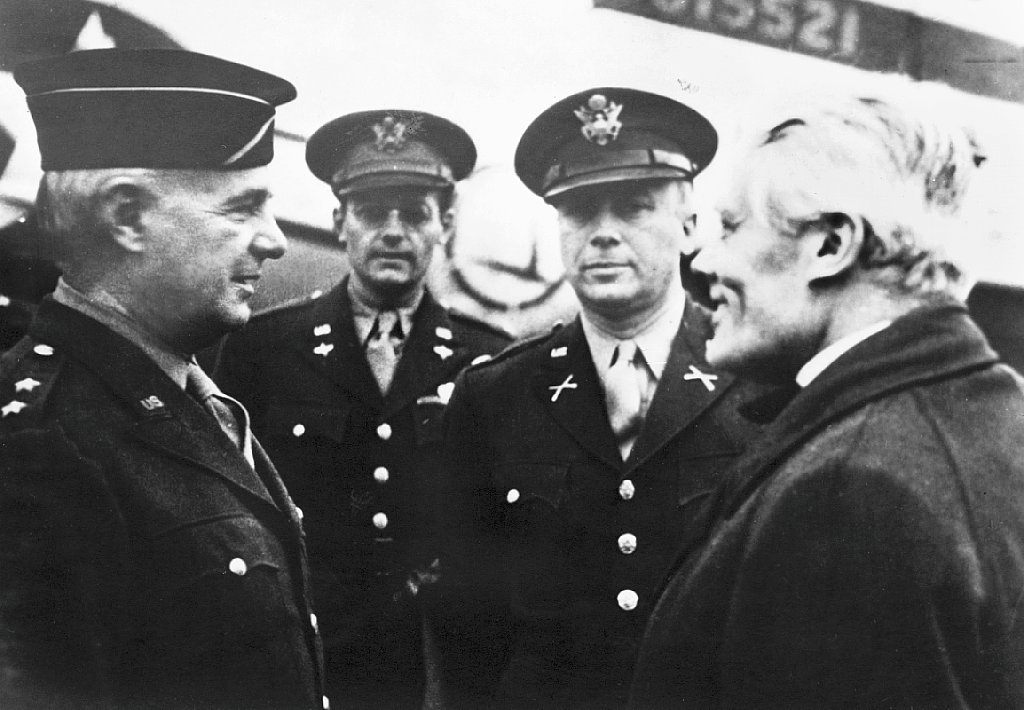
John Christmas Møller speaking with OSS-officers, October 1945

In April 1945, Møller's son was killed in action while serving in the British Army's Grenadier Guards.

After the war Møller briefly became foreign minister in the provisional government of May to November 1945. After the election of 1945 he resumed his old role as leader of the Conservative Party. He lost the election in 1947 and then resigned as party leader, partly because of the Southern Schleswig issue. He died the following year, a week after resigning his membership of the Conservative Party.

His great niece, Pia Christmas-Møller, was a member of parliament between 1987 and 2011.

== Bibliography ==
"Hr. Christmas Moller". The Times. 1948-04-15.

- Harold Flender, Rescue in Denmark, Simon and Schuster, New York, 1963

Political offices
Preceded by Vilhelm Buhl	Foreign Minister of Denmark; 7 May 1945 – 7 November 1945	Succeeded by Gustav Rasmussen
Party political offices
Preceded by Victor Pürschel	Leader of the Conservative People's Party; 1928–1947	Succeeded by Ole Bjørn Kraft
