= Bluhme II cabinet =

Danish Government Cabinet (1864-1865)

C. A. Bluhme's second cabinet
- 13th Cabinet of Denmark

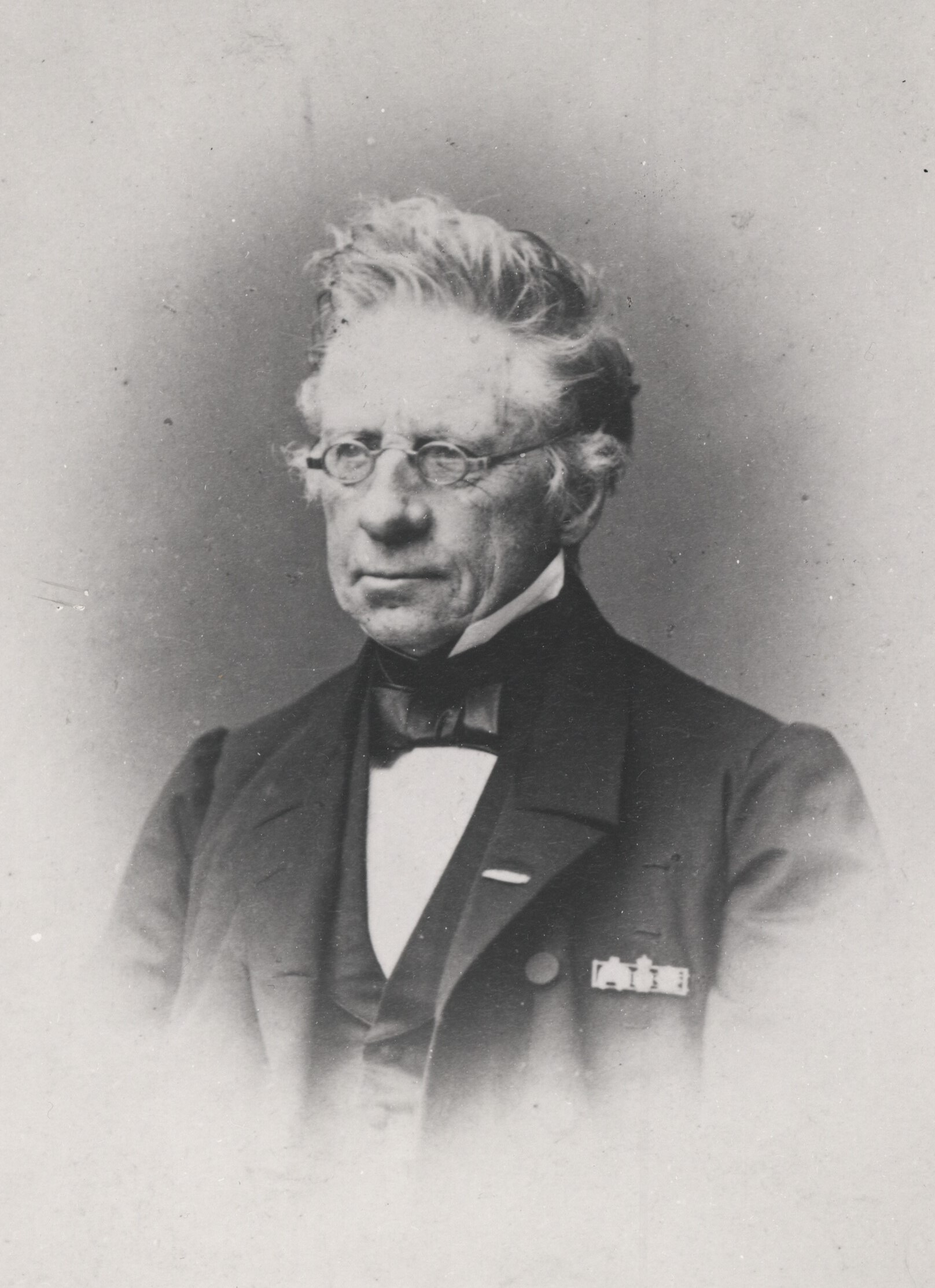
- Date formed: 11 July 1864
- Date dissolved: 6 November 1865

People and organisations
- Monarch: Christian IX
- Prime Minister: Christian Albrecht Bluhme

History
- Predecessor: Monrad
- Successor: Frijs

The Second cabinet of Christian Albrecht Bluhme was the government of Denmark from 11 July 1864 to 6 November 1865 and was in power during the Second Schleswig War.

== List of ministers and portfolios ==
The cabinet consisted of these ministers:

Cabinet members
Portfolio	Minister	Took office	Left office
Council President, Minister of Foreign Affairs & Minister for Holstein and Lauenburg	Christian Albrecht Bluhme	11 July 1864	6 November 1865
Minister for Finance	Christian Nathan David	11 July 1864	6 November 1865
Minister of the Interior	Frederik Ferdinand von Tillisch	11 July 1864	6 November 1865
Minister of the Navy	Otto Hans Lütken	11 July 1864	6 November 1865
Minister of Justice & Kultus Minister	Eugenius Sophus Ernst Heltzen	11 July 1864	30 March 1865
Minister of Justice & Kultus Minister	George Quaade (act.)	30 March 1865	7 April 1865
Minister of Justice & Kultus Minister	Cosmus Bræstrup	7 April 1865	6 November 1865
Minister without portfolio	George Quaade	11 July 1864	13 May 1865
Minister without portfolio	Carl Moltke	13 May 1865	5 July 1865
Minister of War	Christian Frederik Hansen	11 July 1864	6 November 1865
Minister for Schleswig	Christian Gottfried Johannsen	11 July 1864	18 November 1864

Preceded by Monrad	Cabinet of Denmark; 11 July 1864 – 6 November 1865	Succeeded by Frijs
