= Frederik Marcus Knuth =

Frederik Marcus Knuth may refer to:

- Frederik Marcus Knuth (politician) (1813–1856), 5th Count of Knuthenborg, Danish aristocrat, civil servant and politician, first Minister of Foreign Affairs of Denmark
- Frederik Marcus Knuth (taxonomist) (1904–1970), 9th Count of Knuthenborg, Danish taxonomist
