= Minister for Holstein and Lauenburg =

Former Danish ministry

Minister of Holstein and Lauenburg
- Minister for Hertugdømmerne Holsten og Lauenborg
- State coat of arms of the Kingdom of Denmark

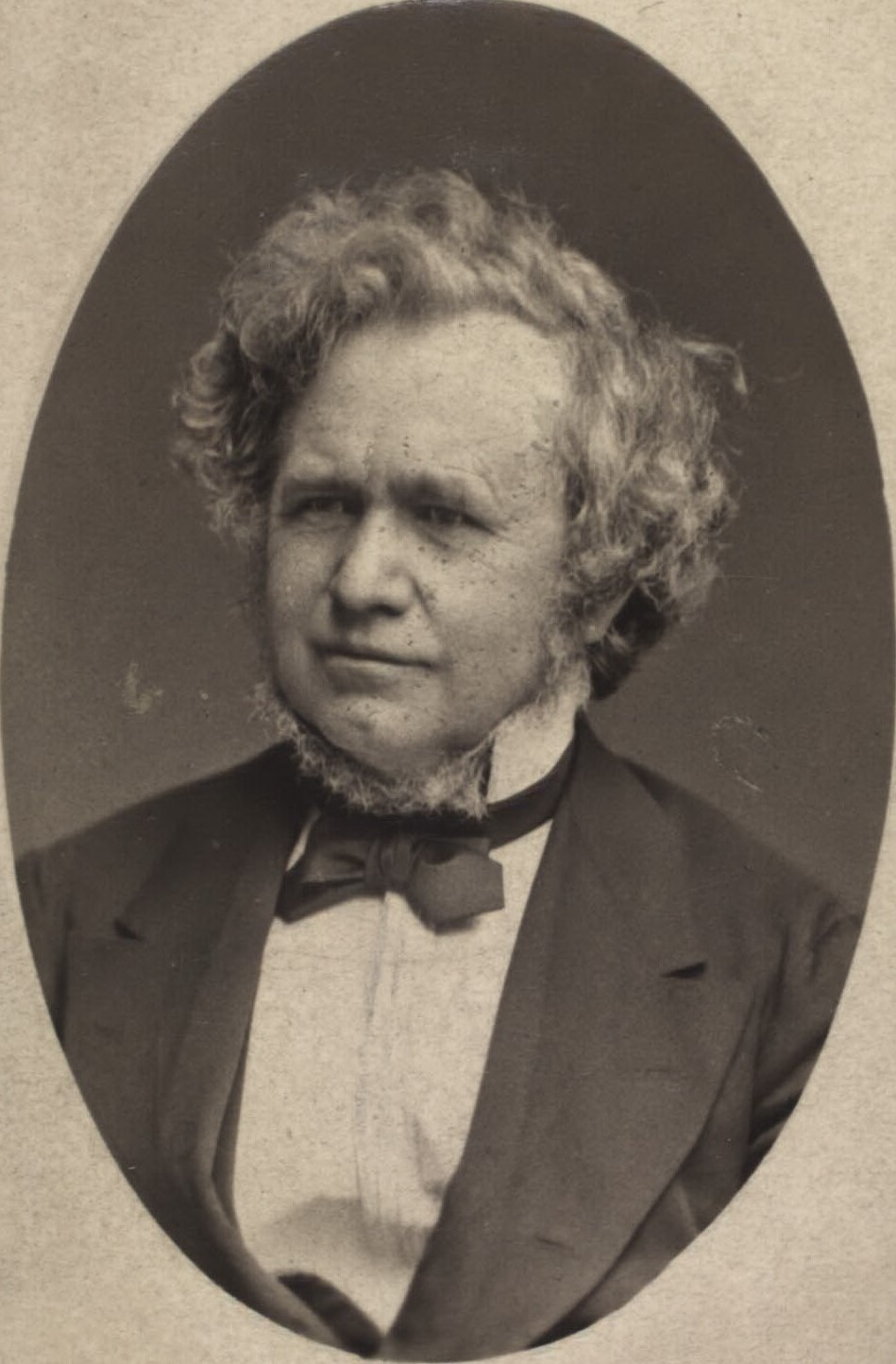
- Longest serving Carl Christian Hall; 30 March 1861 – 31 December 1863
- Ministry for Holstein and Lauenburg
- Type: Minister
- Member of: Cabinet; State Council
- Reports to: the Prime minister
- Seat: Slotsholmen
- Appointer: The Monarch (on the advice of the Prime Minister)
- Formation: 27 January 1852; 174 years ago
- First holder: Heinrich Anna Reventlow-Criminil
- Final holder: Christian Albrecht Bluhme
- Abolished: 16 November 1864; 161 years ago
- Succession: depending on the order in the State Council
- Deputy: Permanent Secretary

The Danish Minister for Holstein and Lauenburg (Danish: Minister for Hertugdømmerne Holsten og Lauenborg) was a Danish ministry that existed from 1852 to 1864. It dealt with the duchies of Holstein and Lauenburg within the Unitary State (Danish: Helstat).

== List of ministers ==
No.	Portrait	Name (born-died)	Term of office			Political party	Government	Ref.
No.	Portrait	Name (born-died)	Took office	Left office	Time in office	Political party	Government	Ref.
1		Heinrich Anna Reventlow-Criminil (1798–1869)	27 January 1852	12 December 1854	2 years, 319 days	Independent	Bluhme I Ørsted	
2		Ludvig Nicolaus von Scheele (1796–1874)	12 December 1854	17 April 1857	2 years, 126 days	Independent	Bang; Andræ	
3		Carl Lundbye (1812–1873)	17 April 1857	13 May 1857	26 days	Independent	Andræ	
4		Iver Johan Unsgaard (1798–1872)	13 May 1857	2 December 1859	1 year, 275 days	Independent	Hall I	
5		Carl Edvard Rotwitt (1812–1860)	2 December 1859	8 February 1860 †	1 year, 172 days	Independent	Rotwitt	
6		Regnar Westenholz (1815–1866)	8 February 1860	24 February 1860	16 days	Independent	Rotwitt	
7		Harald Raasløff (1810–1893)	24 February 1860	30 March 1861	1 year, 34 days	Independent	Hall II	
8		Carl Christian Hall (1812–1888)	30 March 1861	31 December 1863	3 years, 276 days	Independent	Hall II	
9		Ditlev Gothard Monrad (1811–1887)	31 December 1863	11 July 1864	193 days	Independent	Monrad	
10		Christian Albrecht Bluhme (1794–1866)	11 July 1864	16 November 1864	128 days	Independent	Bluhme II	
