= Bang cabinet =

Danish Government Cabinet (1854-1856)

Cabinet of Peter Georg Bang
- 7th Cabinet of Denmark

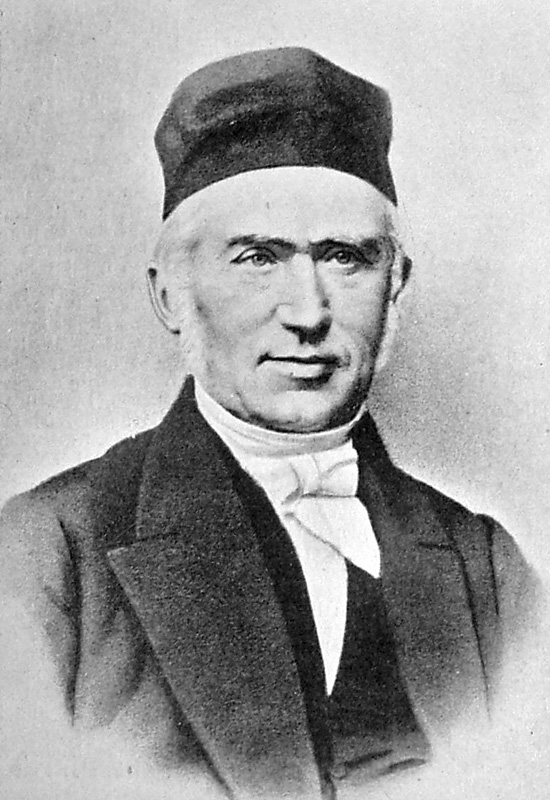
- Peter Georg Bang
- Date formed: 12 December 1854
- Date dissolved: 18 October 1856

People and organisations
- Monarch: Frederick VII
- Prime Minister: Peter Georg Bang
- No. of ministers: 10
- Total no. of members: 13

History
- Elections: 1854; 1855
- Predecessor: Ørsted
- Successor: Andræ

The Cabinet of Peter Georg Bang was the government of Denmark from 12 December 1854 to 18 October 1856.

In 1855, Denmark adopted the "Constitution for The Unitary State", which changed the title of Prime Minister to Council President.

== List of ministers and portfolios ==
The cabinet consisted of the following ministers:

Cabinet members
Portfolio	Minister	Took office	Left office	Ref
Prime Minister & Minister for the Monarchy's Joint Internal Affairs (Note: Position established 16 October 1855.)	Peter Georg Bang	12 December 1854	18 October 1856	
Minister for Schleswig	Harald Raasløff	12 December 1854	18 February 1856	
Minister for Schleswig	Carl Christian Hall	18 February 1856	18 June 1856	
Minister for Schleswig	Friedrich Hermann Wolfhagen	18 June 1856	18 October 1856	
Kultus Minister	Carl Christian Hall	12 December 1854	18 October 1856	
Minister of War	Mathias Lüttichau	12 December 1854	25 May 1856	
Minister of War	Carl Lundbye	25 May 1856	18 October 1856	
Minister of the Interior	Peter Georg Bang	12 December 1854	18 February 1856	
Minister of the Interior	Carl Simony	18 February 1856	4 June 1856	
Minister of the Interior	Iver Johan Unsgaard	4 June 1856	18 October 1856	
Minister of the Navy	Ove Wilhelm Michelsen	12 December 1854	18 October 1856	
Minister of Finance	Carl Christoffer Georg Andræ	12 December 1854	18 October 1856	
Minister of Foreign Affairs	Wulff Scheel-Plessen	12 December 1854	15 January 1855	
Minister of Foreign Affairs	Ludvig Nicolaus von Scheele	15 January 1855	18 October 1856	
Minister for Holstein and Lauenburg	Ludvig Nicolaus von Scheele	12 December 1854	18 October 1856	
Minister of Justice	Anton Wilhelm Scheel	12 December 1854	15 January 1855	
Minister of Justice	Carl Simony	15 January 1855	18 October 1856	
