= Moltesen =

Moltesen is a surname. Notable people with the surname include:

- Eva Moltesen, Finnish-Danish writer and peace activist
- Gunhild Moltesen Agger, Danish academic
- Laust Jevsen Moltesen, Danish church historian and politician
