= Erik Scavenius =

Prime Minister of Denmark (1877–1962)

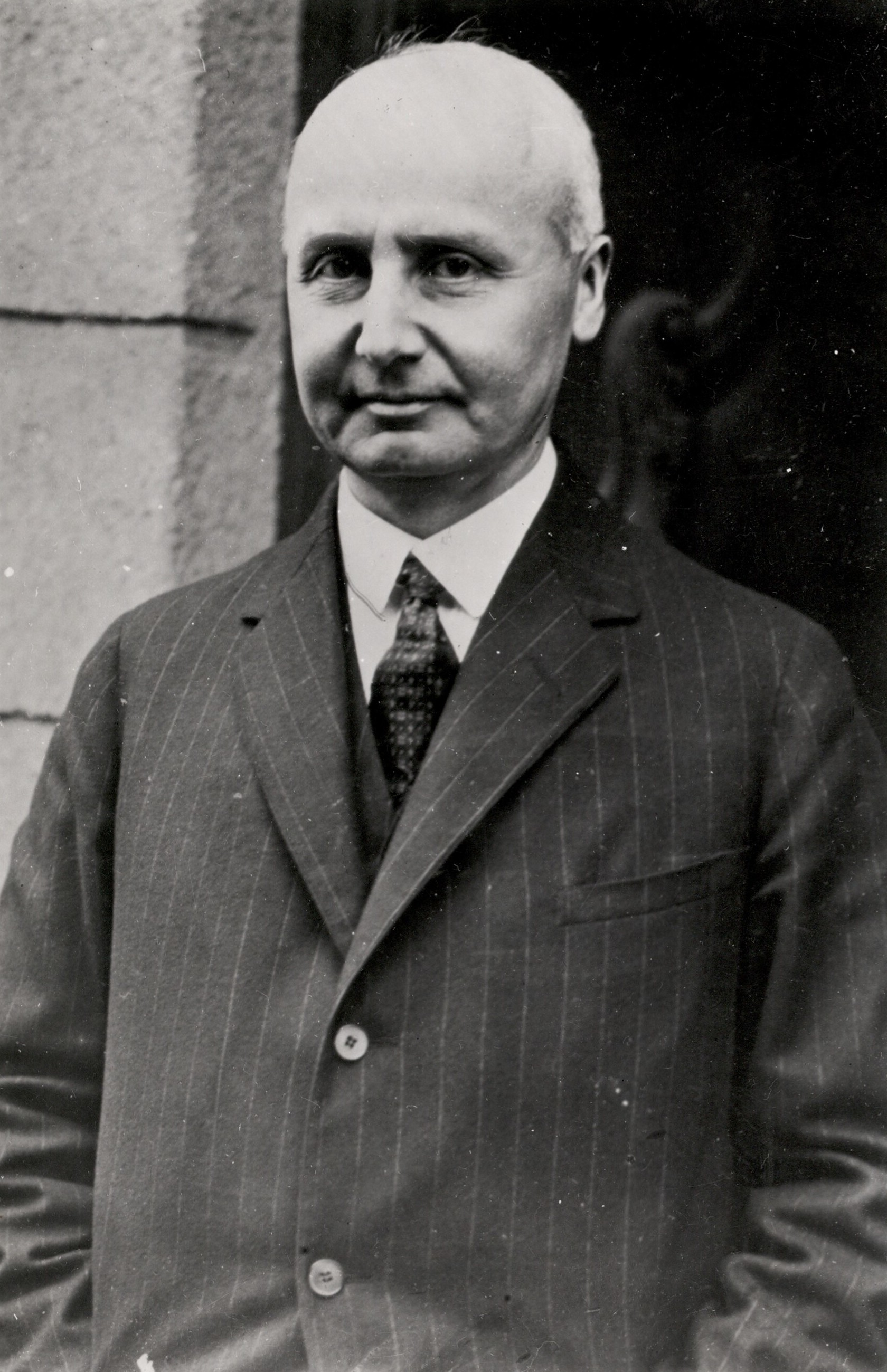

Prime Minister of Denmark
- In office 9 November 1942 – 29 August 1943
- Monarch: Christian X
- Preceded by: Vilhelm Buhl
- Succeeded by: German military rule (next Prime Minister: Vilhelm Buhl)

Minister of Foreign Affairs
- In office 8 July 1940 – 29 August 1943
- Prime Minister: Thorvald Stauning; Vilhelm Buhl; Himself
- Preceded by: Peter R. Munch
- Succeeded by: German military rule (next Foreign Minister: John C. Møller)
- In office 24 June 1913 – 30 March 1920
- Prime Minister: Carl Theodor Zahle
- Preceded by: Edvard Brandes
- Succeeded by: Henri Konow
- In office 28 October 1909 – 5 July 1910
- Prime Minister: Carl Theodor Zahle
- Preceded by: William Ahlefeldt-Laurvig
- Succeeded by: William Ahlefeldt-Laurvig

Personal details
- Born: Erik Julius Christian Scavenius; 13 July 1877 Klintholm, Møn, Denmark
- Died: 29 November 1962 (aged 85) Gentofte, Denmark
- Party: Social Liberal
- Education: University of Copenhagen

Erik Julius Christian Scavenius (Danish pronunciation: [skæˈve̝ˀnius]; 13 July 1877 – 29 November 1962) was the Danish foreign minister from 1909 to 1910, 1913 to 1920 and 1940 to 1943, and prime minister from 1942 to 1943, during the occupation of Denmark until the Danish elected government ceased to function. He was the foreign minister during some of the most important periods of Denmark's modern history, including the First World War, the plebiscites over the return of northern Schleswig to Denmark, and the German occupation. Scavenius was a member of the Landsting (the upper house of the Danish parliament before 1953) from 1918 to 1920 and from 1925 to 1927 representing the Social Liberal Party. He was chairman of its party organization from 1922 to 1924.

Scavenius belonged to a tradition of elite governance that distrusted democratically elected politicians at a time when they were gaining power and influence. He believed that many of them were influenced by ignorant strains of populism and ill-equipped to face tough compromises and realities. For example, during the negotiations over the return of territory to Denmark following the First World War, he advocated a more cautious approach than many more nationalistic figures. He believed that areas that were mostly German should stay in Germany.

His policy of accommodation and compromise toward the Nazi occupation authorities in Denmark during the Second World War is one of the enduring controversies of Danish history. Some see it as a necessary compromise to protect the Danish state and people, but others see it as unnecessarily accommodating of totalitarian Nazi Germany.

== Early life ==
The Scavenius family belongs to the Danish nobility. It was in the family tradition to work as a diplomat. Scavenius graduated in economics from the University of Copenhagen in 1901. Soon afterward, he became employed in the Danish Ministry of Foreign Affairs. He was a secretary at the Danish Embassy in Berlin from 1906 to 1908, a time forming his emphasis upon the primacy of Danish-German relations. Then, he became head of section in the ministry.

== Political career ==
=== Diplomatic and civil career ===
He was an envoy to Vienna and Rome from 1912 to 1913 and to Stockholm from 1924 to 1932. From 1932 to 1940, he was chairman of the board of the major daily Politiken. Scavenius was the owner of a large estate from 1915 to 1946. After 1945, he experienced marital and economic difficulties.

=== Foreign minister ===
The appointment of the 32-year-old head of section Scavenius as minister of foreign affairs in the Radical Left Social Liberal cabinet Danish: Det Radikale Venstre (1909–1910) came as a surprise. He was reappointed when the party formed another cabinet in 1913. During World War I, he strongly put his efforts into the continuation of "the German course", a policy of keeping Denmark out of conflict with its neighbouring great power through adaptation. Among other things he supported giving in to the German demands to mine the Danish Straits in August 1914.

Scavenius was also an important figure as foreign minister during the negotiations surrounding the return of parts of Schleswig to Denmark following the war. Scavenius was one of the chief advocates of the Danish government's official position, advocating a return of only territories with clear Danish majorities (see Easter Crisis of 1920). That was opposed to the more "maximalist" position which demanded a return of all previously Danish territories south to the "Danevirke".

=== Occupation of Denmark ===
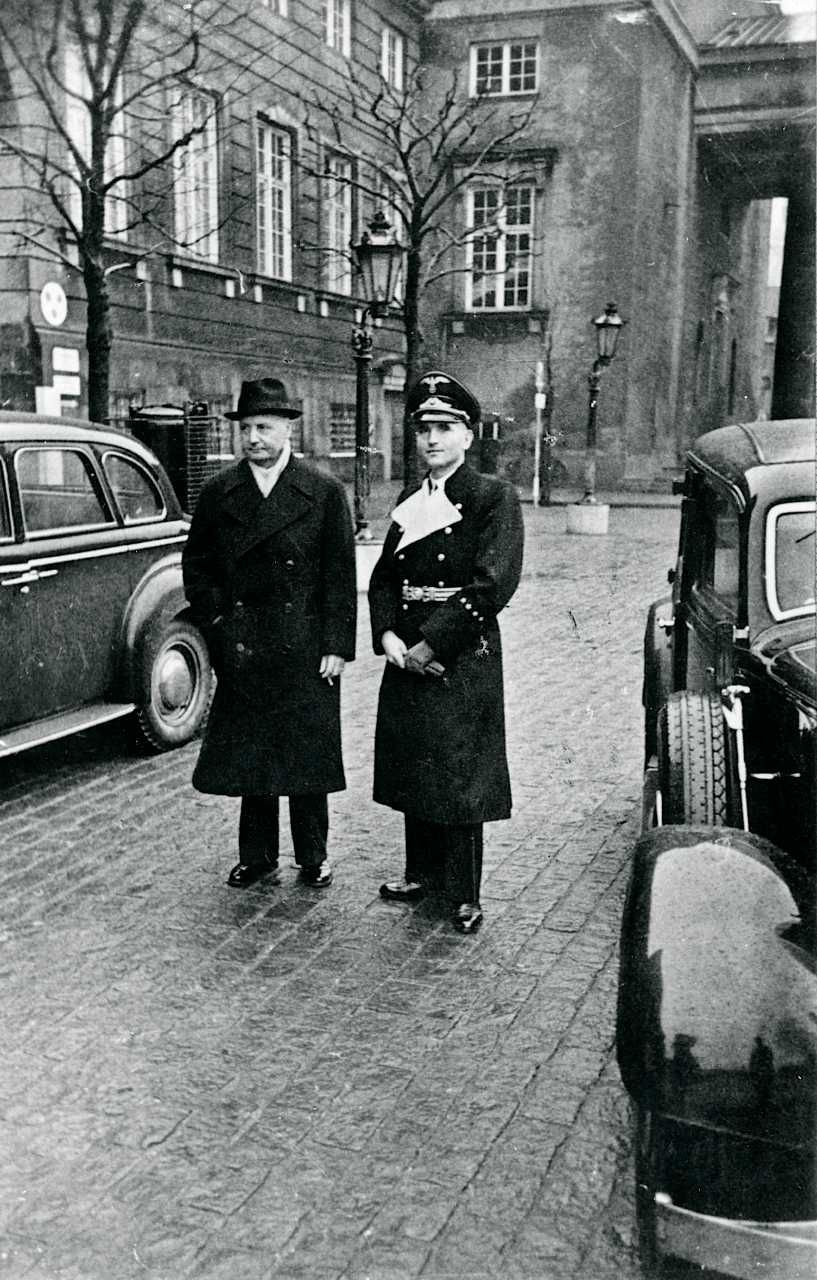
Erik Scavenius (left) with German plenipotentiary of Denmark, Dr. Werner Best.

Scavenius became foreign minister again during most of the German occupation of Denmark. As such, he was the most important liaison between the Danish government and the German authorities. In addition, he was prime minister for some of the war as head of a coalition cabinet after the Telegram Crisis. He was more of a professional diplomat than an elected politician and held an elitist approach to government. At this time, the Social Liberal Party did not consider Scavenius to be its representative although the party accepted his line, along with the other coalition parties.

Scavenius was concerned that emotional public opinion would destabilise his attempts to build a compromise between Danish sovereignty and the realities of occupation. He felt strongly that he was Denmark's most ardent defender. After the war, there was much recrimination of his stance, particularly from members of the active resistance, who felt that he had hindered the cause of resistance and threatened Denmark's national honour. He felt that these people were vain and seeking to build their own reputations or political careers through emotionalism.

After 29 August 1943, Erik Scavenius lost all of his real powers when the German authorities dissolved the Danish government following the refusal of that government to crack down on unrest to the satisfaction of the German plenipotentiary. His cabinet resigned in 1943 and suspended operations. The resignation was never formally accepted by King Christian X of Denmark so the cabinet existed de jure, until a new one was formed following the liberation on 5 May 1945. Scavenius was politically isolated after 1945, but the parliamentary commission on misconduct during the Occupation did not find reason to impeach him for the High Court of the Realm for maladministration of office in its report in 1955.

== Legacy ==
Debate continues over his legacy, and he remains one of the most controversial figures in the history of Danish politics. For example, on the 60th anniversary of the 29 August dissolution of government, prime minister Anders Fogh Rasmussen chastised his predecessor for his stance, saying that it was naive and morally unacceptable. However, historians like Bo Lidegaard and Søren Mørch contend that it was only through Scavenius's policies that Denmark escaped the worst hardships of the war. Bertel Haarder, then a minister in the Rasmussen government, rebutted Lidegaard's theory in 2005, calling it revisionist and arguing that Scavenius carried out an unnecessarily pro-German policy, which was unpopular, dishonourable, and unjustifiable long-term, as he thought that Germany was likely to win the war.

Papers found in the Danish Royal Library revealed that in 1961, Scavenius had been informed that he would be awarded the Israeli "Medallion of Valor". The medallion was due to be presented to him by Eleanor Roosevelt at a ceremony in the United States later that year, but his poor health made Scavenius cancel his appearance. Unknown circumstances caused the medallion to be never officially awarded to him.

Political offices
Preceded by William Ahlefeldt-Laurvig	Foreign Minister of Denmark; 1909–1910	Succeeded by William Ahlefeldt-Laurvig
Preceded by William Ahlefeldt-Laurvig	Foreign Minister of Denmark; 1913–1920	Succeeded by Henri Konow
Preceded by Peter Rochegune Munch	Foreign Minister of Denmark; 1940–1943	Succeeded by German military rule (next Foreign Minister: Vilhelm Buhl)
Preceded by Vilhelm Buhl	Prime Minister of Denmark; 1942–1943	Succeeded by German military rule (next Prime Minister: Vilhelm Buhl)
Party political offices
Preceded by Anders Larsen	Chairman of the Danish Social Liberal Party; 1922–1924	Succeeded by Niels Peter Andreasen
