= Carl Moltke =

Danish minister (1869–1935)

Count Carl Moltke
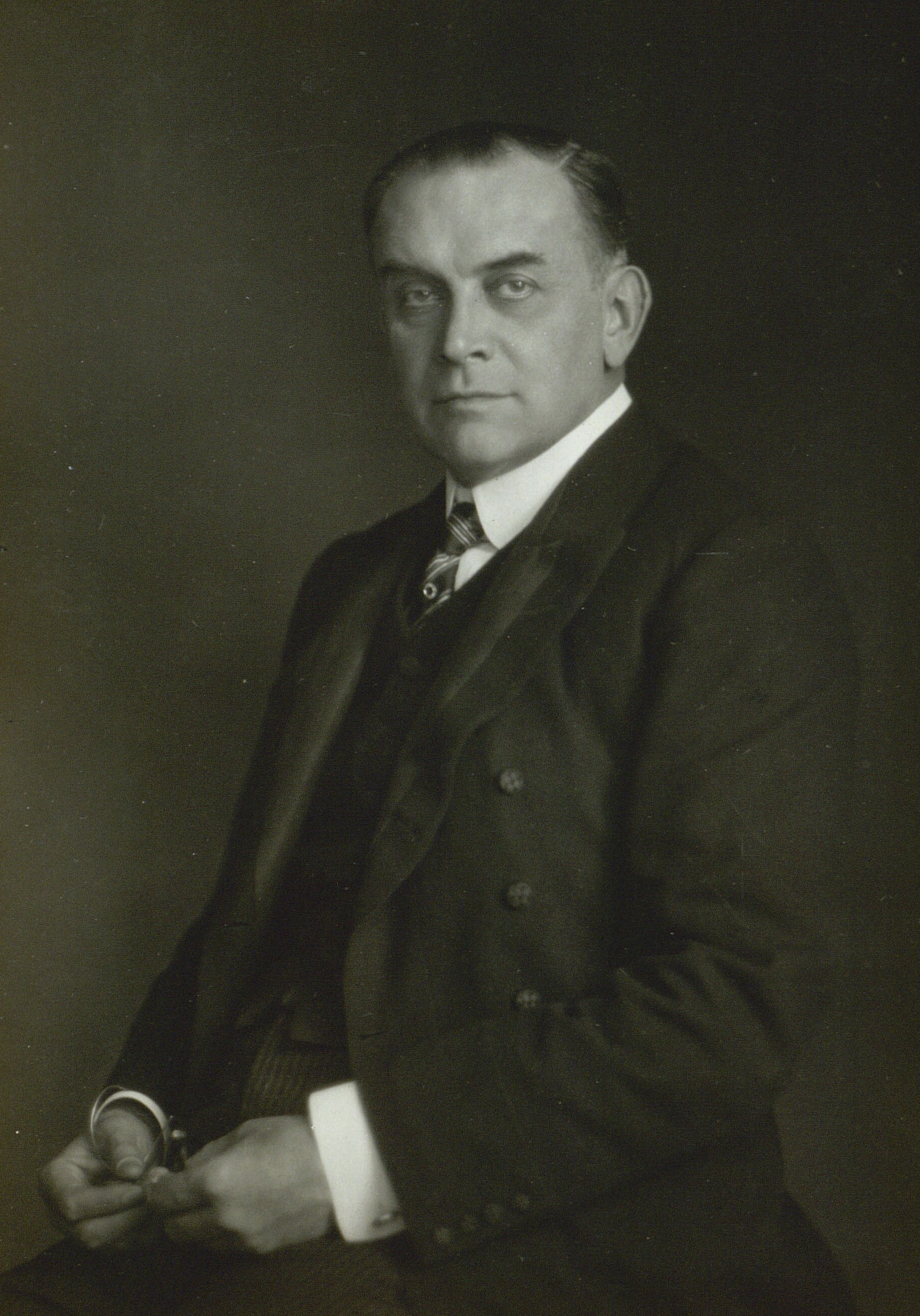
- Moltke circa 1910

Foreign Minister of Denmark
- In office 23 April 1924 – 14 December 1926
- Prime Minister: Thorvald Stauning
- Preceded by: Christian Cold
- Succeeded by: Laust Jevsen Moltesen

Danish Ambassador to Germany
- In office 1912–1924
- Succeeded by: Herluf Zahle

Danish Ambassador to the United States
- In office 1908–1912

Personal details
- Born: Carl Poul Oscar Moltke; 2 January 1869 Brandenburg, Germany
- Died: 5 September 1935 (aged 66) Copenhagen, Denmark
- Party: Independent
- Spouse: Cornelia Van Rensselaer Thayer (m. 1907)
- Children: Carl Adam Nathaniel Thayer Moltke
- Parent(s): Adam Henrik Carl Moltke; Emma Christine Cassini di Capizucchi
- Relatives: Alexandra Moltke Isles (granddaughter)

Count Carl Poul Oscar Moltke (2 January 1869 – 5 September 1935) was the Danish minister to the United States in 1908 and the Foreign Minister of Denmark 1924–1926.

== Early life ==
Carl Poul Oscar Moltke was born on 2 January 1869 in Denmark. He was the son of Adam Henrik Carl Moltke (1828–1913) and Emma Christine, Countess Cassini di Capizucchi (1836–1870). His maternal uncle was Count Arthur Cassini, Marquess di Capizucchi, Russian Ambassador to China and to the United States. His maternal grandparents were Count Poul Cassini, Marquess di Capizucchi, and Elisabeth Loy af Triest.

=== Family ===
His paternal grandfather, Carl Graf von Moltke (1798–1866), was a cousin of Adam Wilhelm Moltke (1785–1864), the first Danish Prime Minister in the Danish constitutional monarchy, and the great-grandson of Adam Gottlob Moltke (1710–1792), a Danish courtier, statesman and diplomat, and favourite of Frederick V of Denmark. His family was very involved in both Danish and German history.

== Career ==
From 1908 to 1912, Moltke was the Danish Ambassador to the United States. He later represented his country as the Ambassador to Germany in Berlin. In 1920, the secretary of the Danish legation in Berlin during World War I, Count Bent Holstein, brought serious charges against Moltke, saying:

The radical Government tried every way to strangle the Slesvig question. The Danish Ambassador in Berlin thus went to the German Foreign Department during the war proposing that Germany give very many iron crosses to men from North Slesvig in order to make them forget Denmark. Not a German, but the Danish Ambassador under the Zahles Government tried Danish souls with German iron crosses.

In 1924, he was chosen by Thorvald Stauning, the first social democratic Prime Minister of Denmark, to be the Foreign Minister of Denmark, serving from 23 April 1924 to 14 December 1926, until Thomas Madsen-Mygdal became prime minister. This happened even though Moltke was not a social democrat, as Stauning believed at the time that a diplomat should hold the post.

In February and March 1930, he served as the chairman of the "Conference for Concerted Economic Action" in Geneva as part of the League of Nations. As chairman, he urged European economic unity to better conditions throughout the world with the aid of the Belgian Foreign Minister, Paul Hymans (who later served as the 2nd President of the League of Nations). He envisioned a broad conception of European economic organization and proposed a tariff truce, which he described as "the consolidation of duties."

== Personal life ==
On 29 June 1907, he married Cornelia Van Rensselaer Thayer (1881–1960), an American who was the daughter of Nathaniel Thayer III. She was born in Boston and was the granddaughter of Nathaniel Thayer Jr. (1808–1883), who married Cornelia Paterson, the daughter of Stephen Van Rensselaer IV. She was also descended from Thomas Cornell as well as the Bayard, Livingston, and Schuyler families. At the wedding, Baron Rosencrantz was his best man. Together, they had a son:

- Count Carl Adam Moltke (1908–1989), a member of the Danish underground in World War II, who married Mabel Wilson Wright (née Comstock) in 1944 (1909–1988). They divorced in 1956 and later that same year, he married Doris Eccles (1914–1965), the daughter of Edward Eccles (1882–1975) of Newport, Rhode Island.

Moltke died on 5 September 1935, aged 66, in Copenhagen.

=== Descendants ===
He was the paternal grandfather of Countess Victoria Ann Moltke and Countess Cornelia Alexandra Moltke Isles (b. 1947), an actress and documentary filmmaker.

Political offices
Preceded by Christian Cold	Foreign Minister of Denmark; 1928 – 1926	Succeeded by Laust Jevsen Moltesen
Preceded by	Danish Ambassador to the United States; 1908 – 1912	Succeeded by
