= Minister for the Monarchy's Joint Internal Affairs =

Minister of Monarchy's Joint Internal Affairs
- Minister for Monarkiets Fælles Indre Anliggender
- State coat of arms of the Kingdom of Denmark

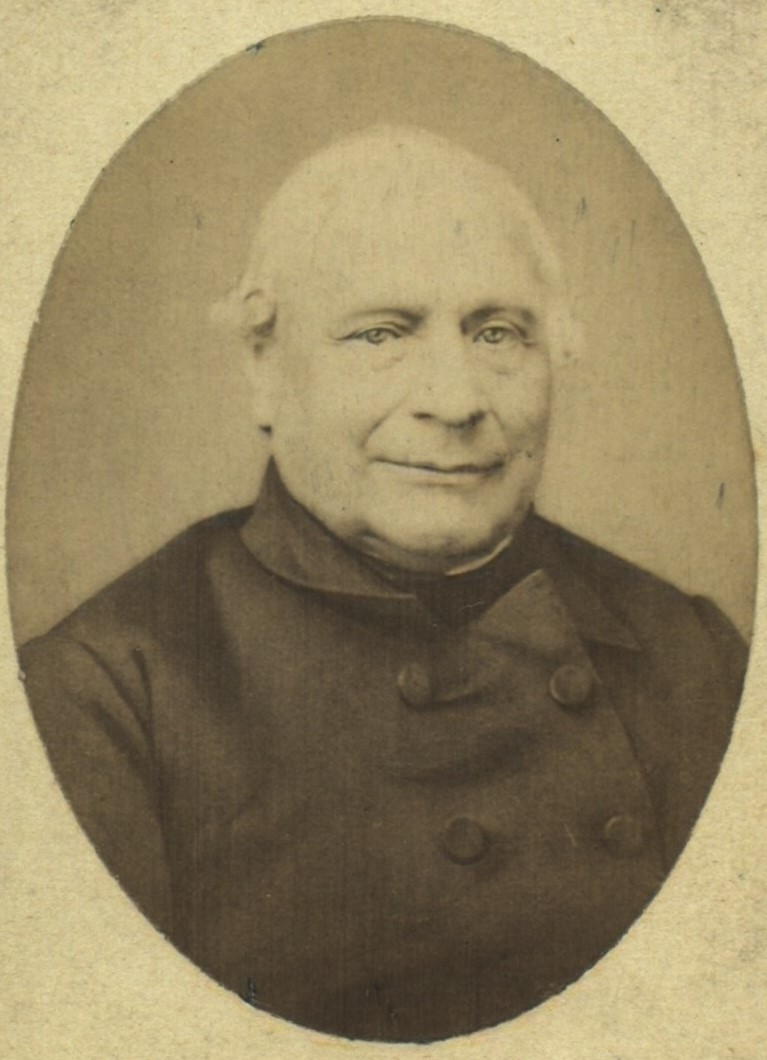
- Longest serving Iver Johan Unsgaard; 18 October 1856 – 26 July 1858
- Type: Minister
- Member of: Cabinet; State Council
- Reports to: the Prime minister
- Seat: Slotsholmen
- Appointer: The Monarch (on the advice of the Prime Minister)
- Precursor: Ministers of Finance
- Formation: 16 October 1855
- First holder: Peter Georg Bang
- Final holder: Iver Johan Unsgaard
- Abolished: 1 August 1858
- Superseded by: Ministers of Finance
- Succession: depending on the order in the State Council
- Deputy: Permanent Secretary

The Minister for the Monarchy's Joint Internal Affairs (Danish: Minister for Monarkiets Fælles Indre Anliggender) was a short lived ministerial title related to the coordination of the unity of the Realm's joint cases.

== History ==
The Ministry for the Monarchy's Joint Internal Affairs - unofficially called the "Joint Ministry of the Interior" - was established by the Royal proclamation of 16 October 1855. Following this, a number of institutions from the Ministry of Finance was transferred to the ministry, including the Postal Service, and the Colonial Central Board. From the Ministry of the Interior, the new ministry took over cases such as citizenship cases.

The ministry was abolished by Royal proclamation of 1 August 1858, and all its resources were placed under Ministry of Finance.

== List of ministers ==
No.	Portrait	Name (born-died)	Term of office			Political party	Government	Ref.
No.	Portrait	Name (born-died)	Took office	Left office	Time in office	Political party	Government	Ref.
1		Peter Georg Bang (1797–1861)	16 October 1855	18 October 1856	1 year, 2 days	Independent	Bang	
2		Iver Johan Unsgaard (1798–1872))	18 October 1856	26 July 1858	1 year, 281 days	Independent	Andræ; Hall I	
