= Eva Moltesen =

Finnish-Danish writer and peace activist

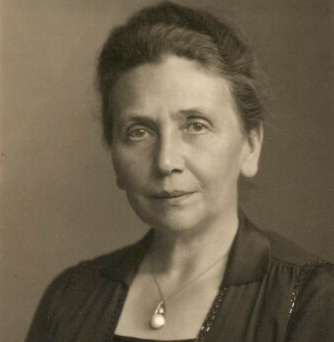
Eva Moltesen

Eva Elisabeth Moltesen née Hällström (1871–1934) was a Finnish-Danish writer and peace activist. In 1896, she moved to Denmark to continue her education, married a Dane and settled there. She published her literary works in both Finnish and Danish, introduced Danes to her native Finland through a series of lectures and established a Finnish Society in Copenhagen. She also created Finnish-Danish and Danish-Finnish dictionaries. In 1915, Moltensen was one of the founding members of Danske Kvinders Fredskæde (Danish Women's Peace Chain), the Danish chapter of the Women's International League for Peace and Freedom. In 1918, representing Venstre, she was a candidate in the national elections but was not elected.

== Early life and education ==
Born in Joroinen, Finland, Eva Elisabeth Hällström was the daughter of the pharmacist Frans Algoth Hällström (1835–1878) and Olga Elisabeth Hasintytär Nyman (1843–1912). While still a small child, after losing both her father and her siblings, she moved with her mother to Helsinki where she attended the Swedish-language Latin School. After matriculating, she studied zoology at Helsinki University, graduating with a master's degree in 1894.

In 1896, she received a scholarship which allowed her to continue her education in Denmark at Askov Højskole, a folk high school. It was there she met her husband to be, the church historian Laust Jevsen Moltesen (1865–1950). They married in 1898 and had four children together : Erik Moltesen (1899–1926), Per Algot Moltesen (1900–1980), who became a diplomat, Bodil Elisabeth Relander (1901–1992) and Harald Moltesen (1905–1931).

== Professional life ==
Although she adapted fully to the Danish way of life, she never forgot her native Finland, speaking to Danish women throughout the country about the way the Finns had been treated by the Russians. In 1904, she established the Finnish Society (Finske Forening) in Copenhagen. On the literary front, in 1905 after giving birth to her fourth and last child, she published Finnish-Danish and Danish-Finnish dictionaries and, in 1910, Fra Kalevalas lunde, a collection of stories from Finland's cultural heritage. Also in Danish, in 1920 she completed a short historical work in Danish titled Det finske Finland (The Finnish Finland). She also published works and articles about Denmark in Finnish.

Together with Eline Hansen, Thora Daugaard, Louise Wright and Clara Tybjerg, in 1915 Moltesen was a co-founder of the Danish peace organization Danske Kvinders Fredskæde. In 1918 and again in 1920, she was a Venstre candidate in the elections to the Folketing but was not elected.

Moltensen was deeply distressed by her son Eric's death in 1926. The same year, her husband became foreign minister until 1929. Thereafter, she became increasingly weak, spending most of her time at home. She died in Gentofte on 10 November 1934 and is buried in Gentofte Cemetery.

== See also ==
- List of peace activists
