= Minister for Schleswig =

Former political position in Danish government

Minister of Schleswig
- Minister for Hertugdømmet Slesvig
- State coat of arms of the Kingdom of Denmark

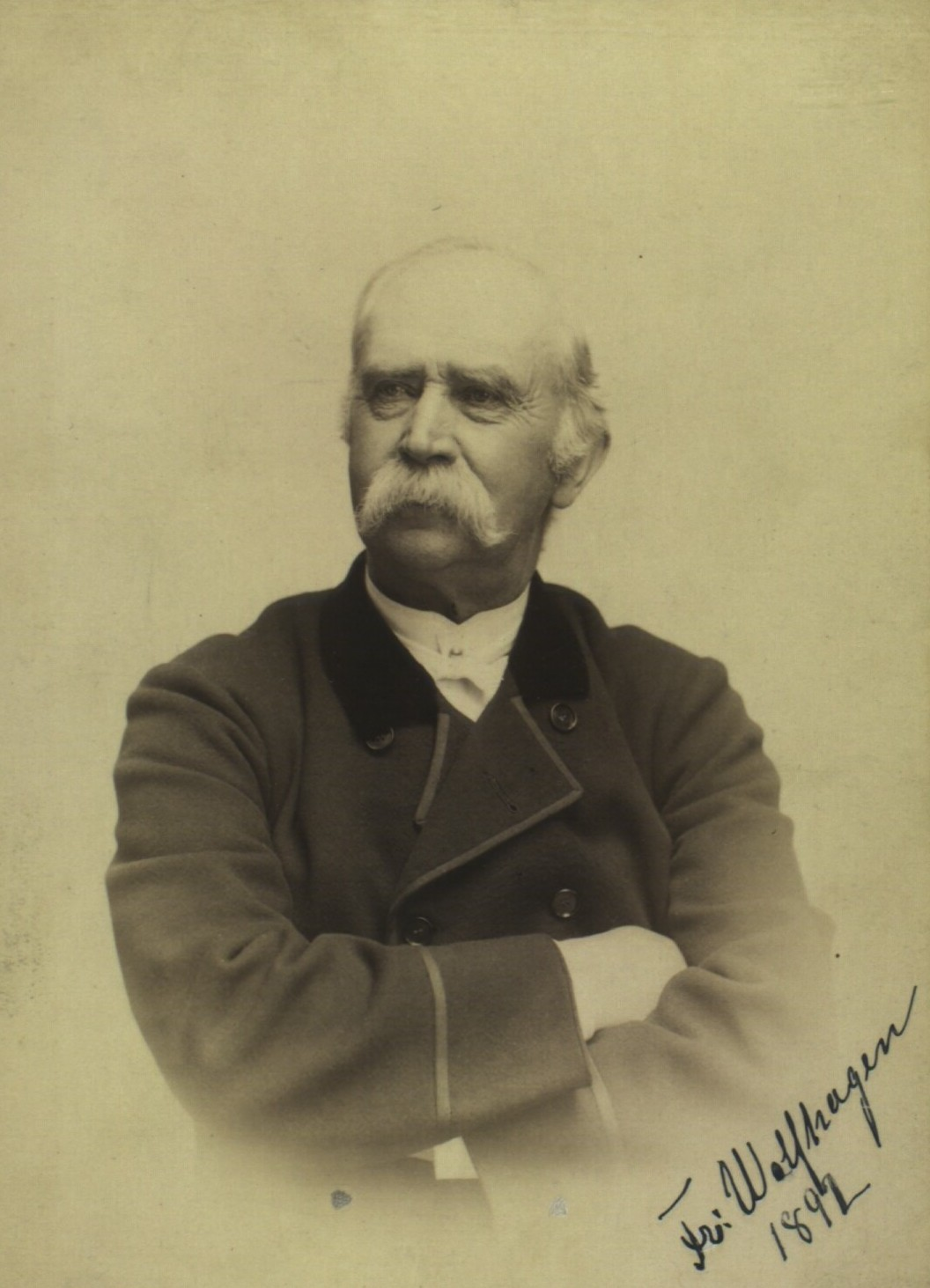
- Longest serving Friedrich Hermann Wolfhagen; 18 June 1856—2 December 1859; 24 February 1860—31 December 1863
- Type: Minister
- Member of: Cabinet; State Council
- Reports to: the Prime minister
- Seat: Slotsholmen
- Appointer: The Monarch (on the advice of the Prime Minister)
- Formation: 5 March 1851; 175 years ago
- First holder: Frederik Ferdinand Tillisch
- Final holder: Christian Gottfried Wilhelm Johannsen
- Abolished: 18 November 1864; 161 years ago
- Succession: depending on the order in the State Council
- Deputy: Permanent Secretary

The Danish Minister for Schleswig (Danish: Minister for Hertugdømmet Slesvig) was a Danish ministry that existed from 1851 to 1864. It dealt with the Duchy of Schleswig within the Unitary State (Danish: Helstat). Following the Danish defeat in the Second Schleswig War, and the subsequent loss of Schleswig, the position was abolished.

== List of ministers ==
No.	Portrait	Name (born-died)	Term of office			Political party	Government	Ref.
No.	Portrait	Name (born-died)	Took office	Left office	Time in office	Political party	Government	Ref.
1		Frederik Ferdinand Tillisch (1785–1864)	5 March 1851	13 July 1851	130 days	Independent	Moltke II	
2		Carl Emil Bardenfleth (1807–1857)	13 July 1851	27 January 1852	198 days	Independent	Moltke III–IV	
3		Carl Moltke (1798–1866)	27 January 1852	12 December 1854	2 years, 319 days	Independent	Bluhme I Ørsted	
4		Harald Raasløff (1810–1893)	12 December 1854	18 February 1856	1 year, 68 days	Independent	Bang	
5		Carl Christian Hall (1812–1888)	18 February 1856	18 June 1856	121 days	Independent	Bang	
6		Friedrich Hermann Wolfhagen (1818–1894)	18 June 1856	2 December 1859	3 years, 167 days	Independent	Bang; Andræ; Hall I	
7		Carl Frederik Blixen-Finecke (1822–1873)	2 December 1859	24 February 1860	84 days	Independent	Rotwitt	
(6)		Friedrich Hermann Wolfhagen (1818–1894)	24 February 1860	31 December 1863	3 years, 310 days	Independent	Hall II	
8		Carl Frederik Simony (1806–1872)	31 December 1863	24 January 1864	3 years, 310 days	National Liberal	Monrad	
9		Christian Gottfried Wilhelm Johannsen (1813–1888)	24 January 1864	18 November 1864	299 days	Independent	Monrad; Bluhme II	
