= Gustav Rasmussen =

Danish statesman and diplomat (1895–1953)

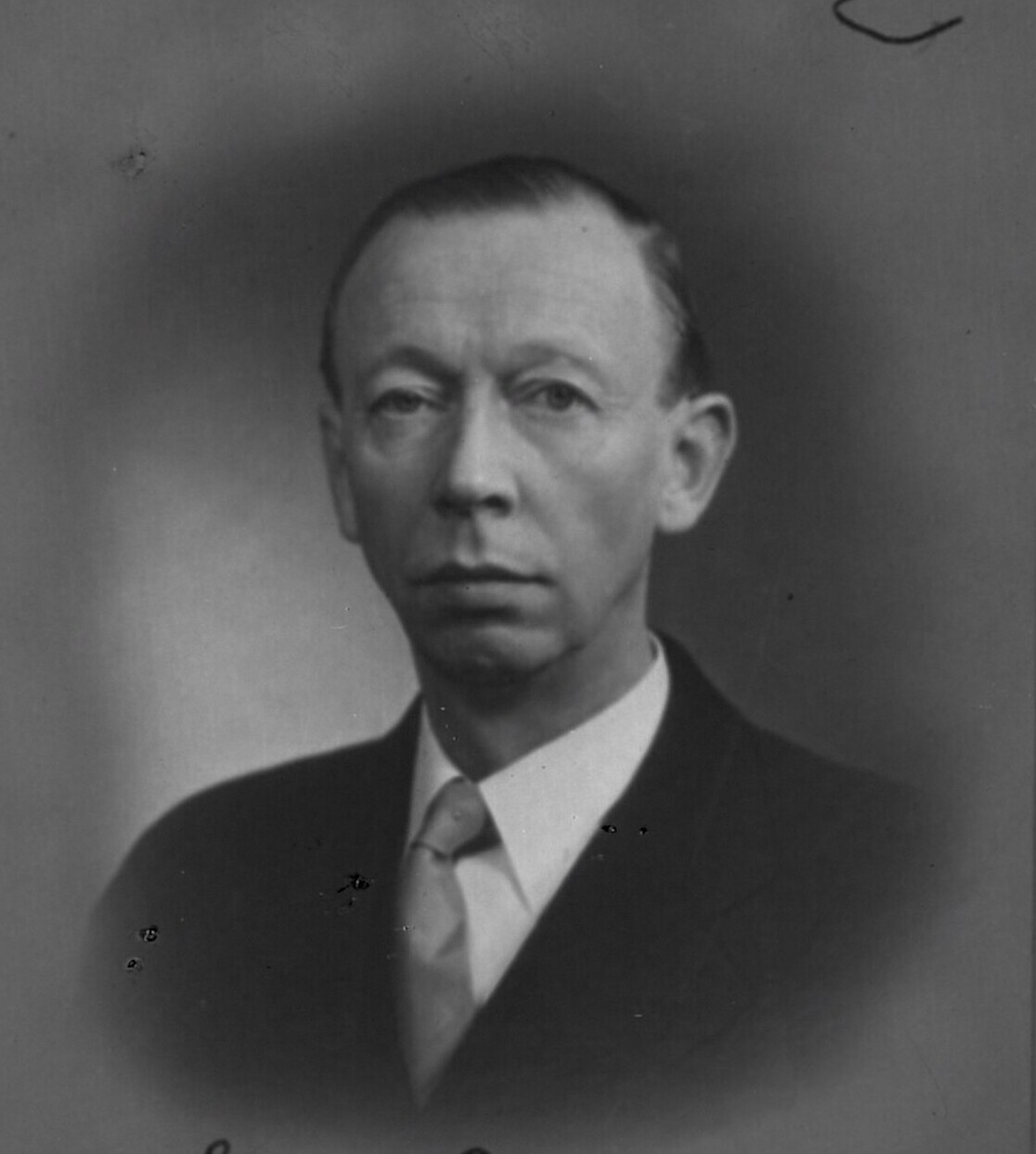

Minister of Foreign Affairs
- In office 7 November 1945 – 30 October 1950
- Prime Minister: Knud Kristensen; Hans Hedtoft
- Preceded by: John Christmas Møller
- Succeeded by: Ole Bjørn Kraft

Personal details
- Born: 10 August 1895 Odense, Denmark
- Died: 13 September 1953 (aged 58) Copenhagen, Denmark
- Party: Independent.

Gustav Rasmussen (August 10, 1895 – September 13, 1953) was a Danish statesman and diplomat who served as foreign minister of Denmark from 1945 to 1950. He was one of the signatories of the North Atlantic Treaty. He later served as Danish ambassador to Italy.

Political offices
Preceded by John Christmas-Møller	Foreign Minister of Denmark; 7 November 1945 – 30 October 1950	Succeeded by Ole Bjørn Kraft
