= Det nye Danmark =

Danish conservative magazine (1928–1937)

- Categories: Conservative magazine
- Founder: Ole Bjørn Kraft; Alfred Bindslev
- Founded: 1928
- Final issue: 1937
- Country: Denmark
- Based in: Copenhagen
- Language: Danish

Det nye Danmark (Danish: New Denmark) was a conservative magazine which existed between 1928 and 1937 in Copenhagen, Denmark. It was founded, published and edited by two Danish conservatives, Ole Bjørn Kraft and Alfred Bindslev.

== History and profile ==
Det nye Danmark was started in 1928. The founders were Ole Bjørn Kraft and Alfred Bindslev. They were both the publisher and editor of Det nye Danmark. Ole Bjørn Kraft's term as editor was between 1928 and 1932 and then between 1934 and 1937. One of the contributors was Jack G. Westergaard. The magazine was very influential in shaping the conservative policies until its closure in 1937.
