= C. M. T. Cold =

Danish politician and naval officer (1863–1934)

Christian Cold
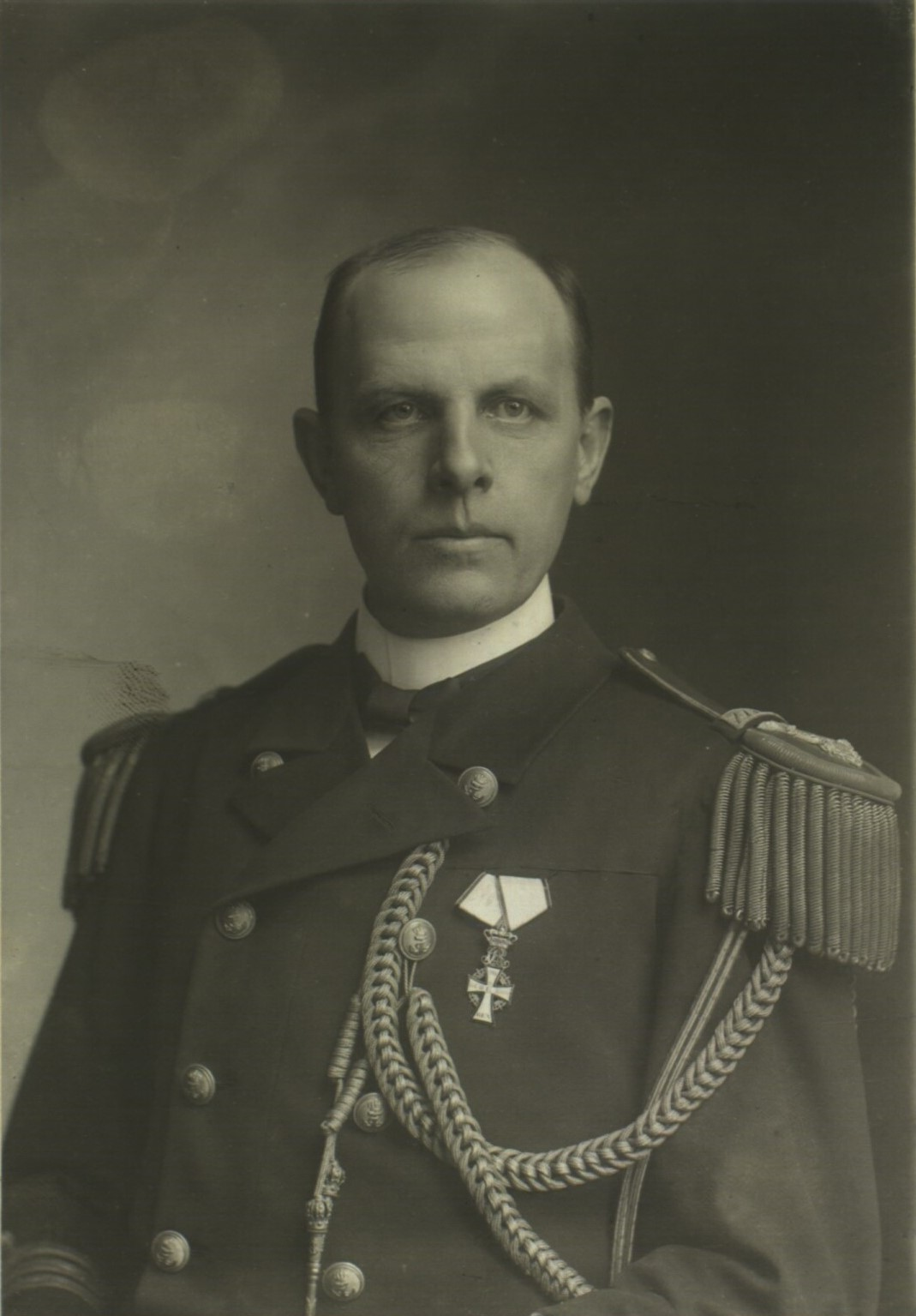

Minister of Foreign Affairs
- In office 9 October 1922 – 23 April 1924
- Prime Minister: Niels Neergaard
- Preceded by: Harald Scavenius
- Succeeded by: Carl Moltke

Governor of the Danish West Indies
- In office 27 April 1905 – 21 February 1908
- Preceded by: Frederik Nordlien
- Succeeded by: Peter Carl Limpricht

Personal details
- Born: 10 June 1863 Frederiksberg, Denmark
- Died: 7 December 1934 (aged 71) Copenhagen, Denmark

Christian Magdalus Thestrup Cold (10 June 1863 – 7 December 1934) was a Danish politician and naval officer who served as the Governor of the Danish West Indies from 1905 to 1908. He later served as chief executive officer of Det Forenede Dampskibs-Selskab from 1908 to 1921 and as Minister of Foreign Affairs from 1922 to 1924.
