= William Ahlefeldt-Laurvig =

Danish politician and diplomat (1860–1923)

Carl William Count Ahlefeldt-Laurvig (2 May 1860 – 29 November 1923) was a Danish politician and diplomat. He was Minister of Foreign Affairs from 1908 to 1909 and 1910 to 1913.
