= Frederik Marcus Knuth (politician) =

Danish nobleman and Minister of Foreign Affairs of the Kingdom of Denmark

His Grace Frederik Marcus Knuth S.K..
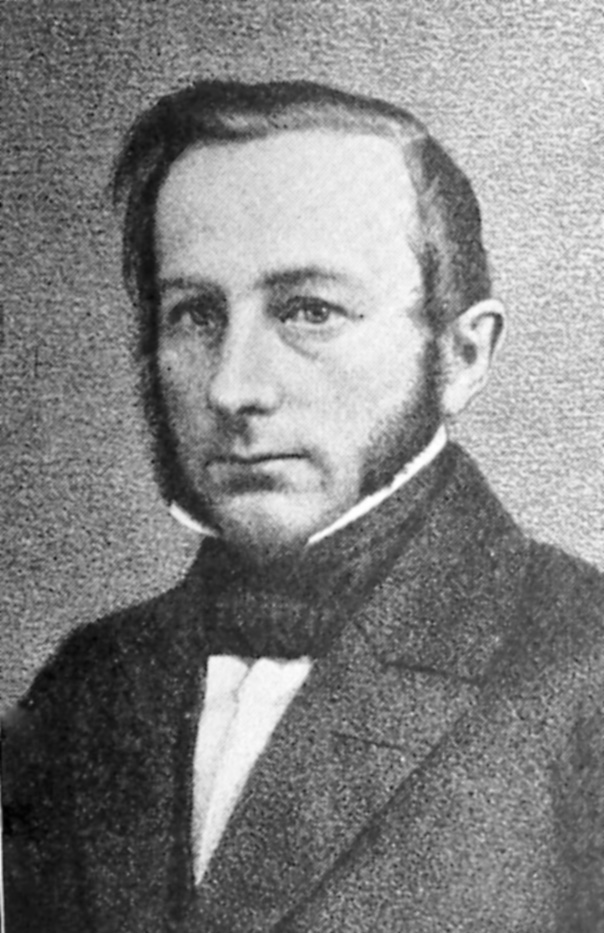
- Frederik Marcus Knuth, 5th Count of Knuthenborg

1st Minister of Foreign Affairs of Denmark
- In office 22 March 1848 – 16 November 1848
- Preceded by: Position established
- Succeeded by: Adam Wilhelm Moltke, Count of Bregentved

Personal details
- Born: 11 January 1813 Christiania (Oslo), Norway, Denmark-Norway
- Died: 8 January 1856 (aged 42) Copenhagen, Denmark
- Resting place: Sorø Old Cemetery, Sorø, Denmark
- Party: Independent
- Spouse: Karen Rothe (m. 1837)
- Children: 6, including: Eggert Christopher Knuth, 6th Count of Knuthenborg; Adam Wilhelm Knuth, 7th Count of Knuthenborg
- Parent(s): Eggert Christopher Count Knuth; Karen Rosenkrantz
- Education: Copenhagen University

Frederik Marcus Knuth, 5th Count of Knuthenborg S.K. (11 January 1813 – 8 January 1856) was a Danish aristocrat, landowner, civil servant and politician.

A member of the Knuth family, he was educated at home and later at the University of Copenhagen. From 1847 to 1848 he served as amtmand in Sorø Amt. After the introduction of the constitutional monarchy in 1848, Knuth served as the first Minister of Foreign Affairs of Denmark from March to November 1848. From November 1848, he was member of The Danish Constituent Assembly (Danish: Den Grundlovgivende Rigsforsamling) as one of the members appointed by the king.

With the title of enfeoffed count (Danish: lensgreve), he was the fifth holder of the County of Knuthenborg on the island of Lolland from 1818 to 1856.

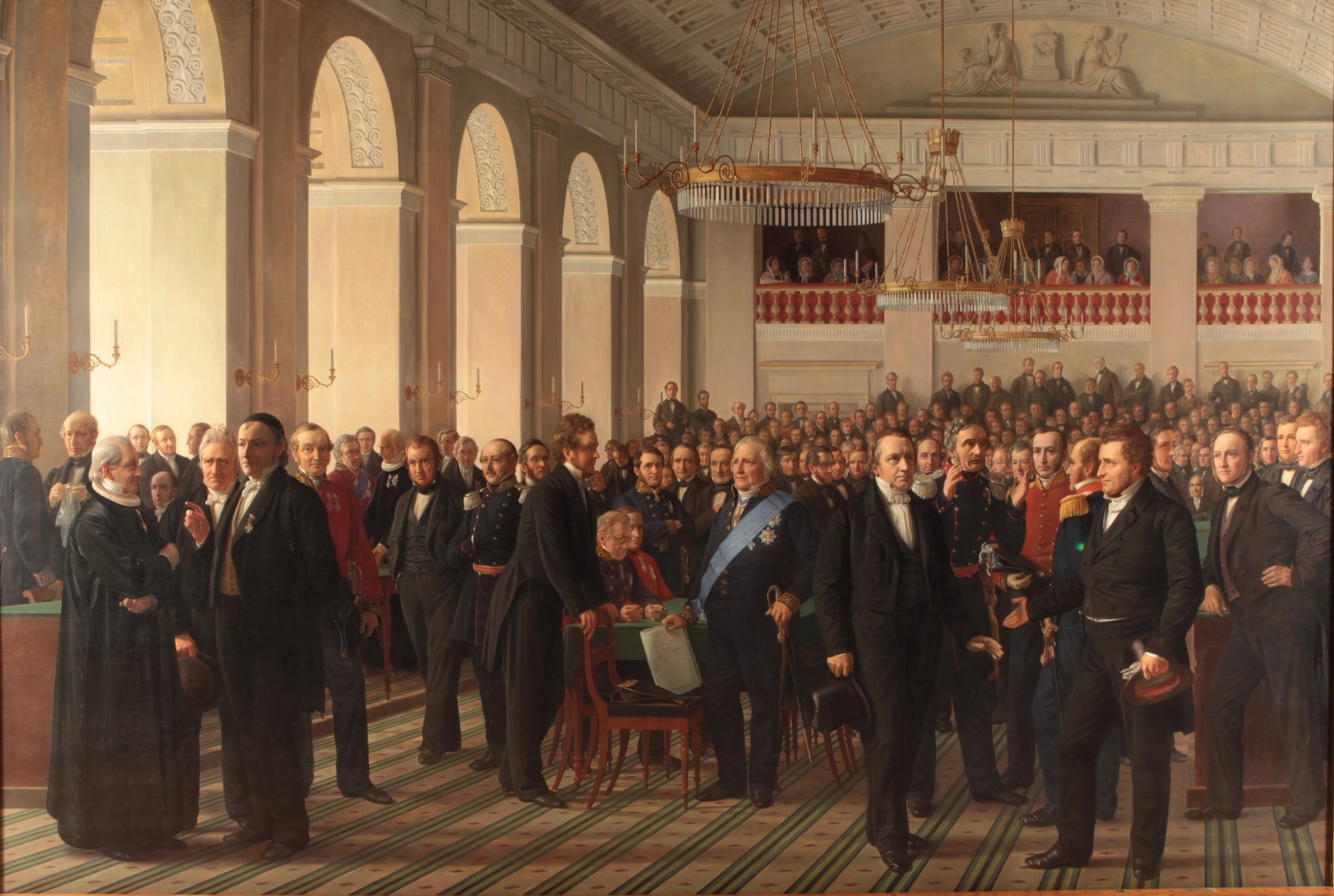
Constantin Hansen: The Danish Constituent Assembly (1864)

== Notes and references ==
=== Bibliography ===
- Danmarks Adels Aarbog 1919 (PDF). Copenhagen: J.H. Schultz. 1919. pp. 528–30.
- Andersen Bille, Carl Steen (1895). "Knuth, Frederik Marcus Greve". Dansk biografisk Lexikon, tillige omfattende Norge for tidsrummet 1537-1814 (in Danish). 9 (1st ed.). Copenhagen: Gyldendals Forlag: 300–303.

Political offices
Preceded by None (office created)	Foreign Minister of Denmark; 1848–1848	Succeeded by Adam Wilhelm Moltke
Danish nobility
Preceded by Frederik Knuth	Count of Knuthenborg; 1818–1856	Succeeded by Eggert Christopher Knuth
