= Minister of Foreign Affairs (Denmark) =

- Udenrigsminister (Danish)
- State coat of arms of the Kingdom of Denmark

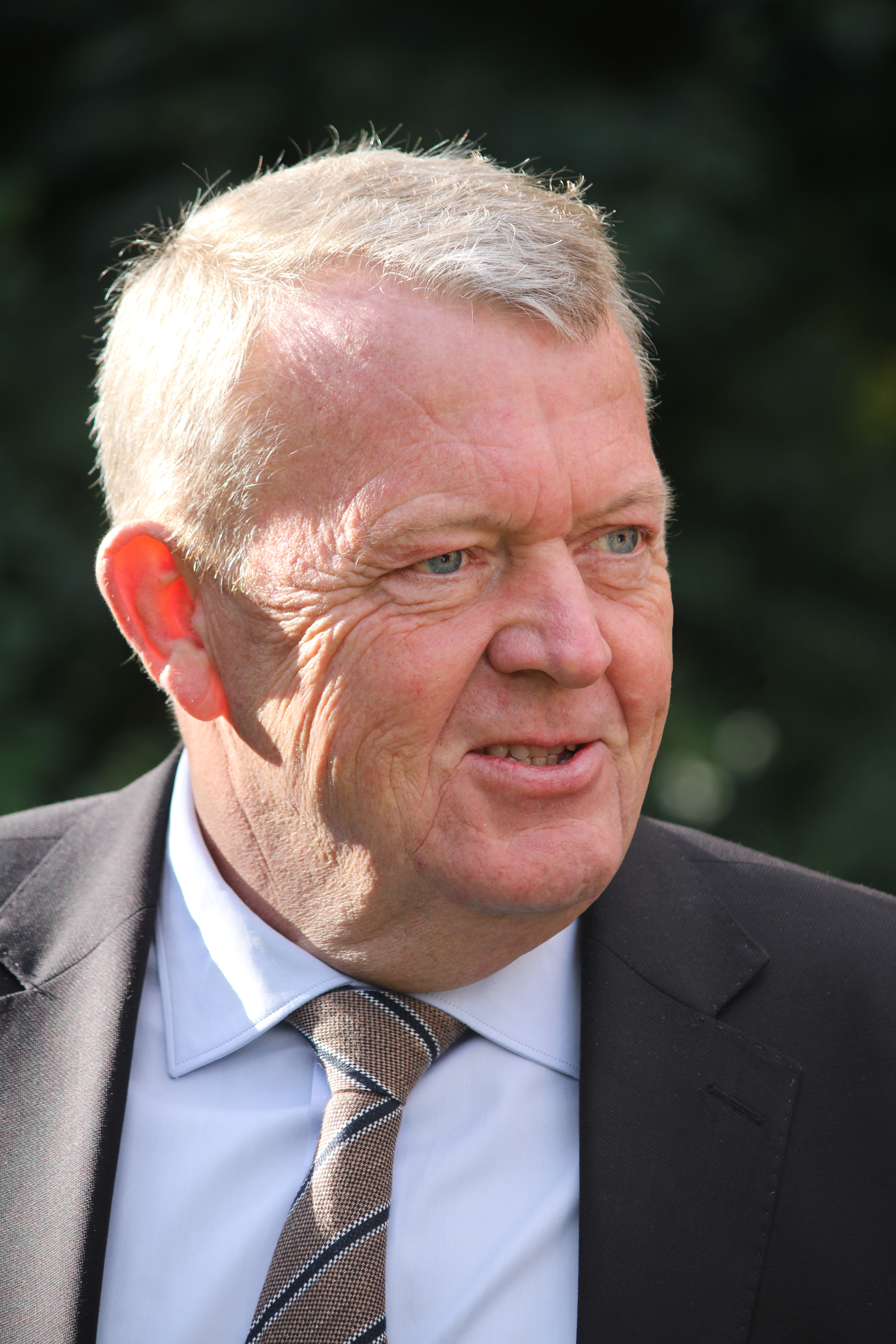
- Incumbent; Lars Løkke Rasmussen since 15 December 2022
- Ministry of Foreign Affairs
- Type: Minister
- Member of: Cabinet; State Council; Government's Security Committee
- Reports to: the prime minister
- Seat: Slotsholmen
- Appointer: The Monarch (on the advice of the prime minister)
- Formation: 22 March 1848; 178 years ago
- First holder: Frederik Marcus Knuth
- Succession: depending on the order in the State Council
- Deputy: Permanent Secretary
- Salary: 1.786.953,32 DKK (€239,724), in 2026
- Website: Official website

The Minister for Foreign Affairs (Danish: Udenrigsminister, Faroese: Uttanríkisráðharra, Greenlandic: Nunanut Allanut Ministeri) is the head of the Ministry of Foreign Affairs of Denmark. The officeholder is in charge of Danish (Denmark proper, (Note: The Kingdom of Denmark's territory in continental Europe is referred to as "Denmark proper" (Danish: egentlig Danmark), "metropolitan Denmark", or simply Denmark. In this article, usage of "Denmark" excludes Greenland and the Faroe Islands.) the Faroe Islands and Greenland) foreign policy and international relations.

The current Minister for Foreign Affairs is former Prime Minister Lars Løkke Rasmussen.

== List of Danish foreign ministers ==
=== Ministers under Frederick VII (1848–1863) ===
No.	Portrait	Name (born–died)	Term of office			Political party	Government	Ref.
No.	Portrait	Name (born–died)	Took office	Left office	Time in office	Political party	Government	Ref.
1		Frederik Marcus Knuth (1813–1856)	22 March 1848	16 November 1848	239 days	Independent	Moltke I	
2		Adam Wilhelm Moltke (1785–1864)	16 November 1848	6 August 1850	1 year, 263 days	Independent	Moltke II	
3		Holger Christian Reedtz (1800–1857)	6 August 1850	18 October 1851	1 year, 73 days	Independent	Moltke II–III	
4		Christian Albrecht Bluhme (1794–1866)	18 October 1851	12 December 1854	3 years, 55 days	Independent	Moltke IV; Bluhme I Ørsted	
5		Wulff Scheel-Plessen (1809–1876)	12 December 1854	15 January 1855	34 days	Independent	Bang	
6		Ludvig Nicolaus von Scheele (1796–1874)	15 January 1855	13 Maj 1857	2 years, 118 days	Independent	Bang; Andræ	
7		Ove Wilhelm Michelsen (1800–1880)	13 Maj 1857	10 July 1858	1 year, 84 days	Independent	Hall I	
8		Carl Christian Hall (1812–1888)	10 July 1858	2 December 1859	1 year, 145 days	National Liberal	Hall I	
9		Carl Frederik Blixen-Finecke (1822–1873)	2 December 1859	24 February 1860	84 days	Independent	Rotwitt	
(8)		Carl Christian Hall (1812–1888)	24 February 1860	31 December 1863	3 years, 310 days	National Liberal	Hall II	

=== Ministers under Christian IX (1863–1906) ===
No.	Portrait	Name (born–died)	Term of office			Political party	Government	Ref.
No.	Portrait	Name (born–died)	Took office	Left office	Time in office	Political party	Government	Ref.
10		Ditlev Gothard Monrad (1811–1887)	31 December 1863	8 January 1864	1 year, 263 days	National Liberal	Monrad	
11		George Quaade (1813–1889)	8 January 1864	11 July 1864	185 days	Independent	Monrad	
(4)		Christian Albrecht Bluhme (1794–1866)	11 July 1864	6 November 1865	1 year, 118 days	Independent	Bluhme II	
12		Christian Emil Krag-Juel-Vind-Frijs (1817–1896)	6 November 1865	28 May 1870	4 years, 203 days	National Landowners	Frijs	
13		Otto Rosenørn-Lehn (1821–1892)	28 May 1870	11 June 1875	5 years, 14 days	National Landowners	Holstein-Holsteinborg; Fonnesbech	
14		Frederik Moltke (1825–1875)	11 June 1875	1 October 1875 #	112 days	National Landowners	Estrup	
(13)		Otto Rosenørn-Lehn (1821–1892)	10 November 1875	21 May 1892	16 years, 193 days	National Landowners	Estrup	
15		Tage Reedtz-Thott (1839–1923)	21 May 1892	23 May 1897	5 years, 2 days	Højre	Estrup; Reedtz-Thott	
16		Niels Frederik Ravn (1826–1910)	23 May 1897	27 April 1900	2 years, 339 days	Højre	Hørring	
17		Hannibal Sehested (1842–1924)	27 April 1900	24 July 1901	1 year, 88 days	Højre	Sehested	
18		Johan Henrik Deuntzer (1845–1918)	24 July 1901	14 January 1905	3 years, 174 days	Venstre Reform Party	Deuntzer	
19		Frederik Raben-Levetzau (1850–1933)	14 January 1905	12 October 1908	3 years, 272 days	Venstre Reform Party	Christensen I–II	

=== Ministers under Frederik VIII (1906–1912) ===
No.	Portrait	Name (born–died)	Term of office			Political party	Government	Ref.
No.	Portrait	Name (born–died)	Took office	Left office	Time in office	Political party	Government	Ref.
20		William Ahlefeldt-Laurvig (1860–1923)	12 October 1908	28 October 1909	1 year, 16 days	Venstre Reform Party	Neergaard I Holstein-Ledreborg	
21		Erik Scavenius (1877–1962)	28 October 1909	5 July 1910	250 days	Social Liberal	Zahle I	
(20)		William Ahlefeldt-Laurvig (1860–1923)	5 July 1910	21 June 1913	2 years, 351 days	Venstre	Berntsen	

=== Ministers under Christian X (1912–1947) ===
No.	Portrait	Name (born–died)	Term of office			Political party	Government	Ref.
No.	Portrait	Name (born–died)	Took office	Left office	Time in office	Political party	Government	Ref.
–		Edvard Brandes (1847–1931) acting	21 June 1913	24 June 1913	3 days	Social Liberal	Zahle II	
(21)		Erik Scavenius (1877–1962)	24 June 1913	30 March 1920	6 years, 280 days	Social Liberal	Zahle II	
22		Henri Konow (1862–1939)	30 March 1920	5 April 1920	6 days	Independent	Liebe	
23		Otto Scavenius (1875–1945)	5 April 1920	5 May 1920	30 days	Independent	Friis	
24		Harald Scavenius (1873–1939)	5 May 1920	9 October 1922	2 years, 157 days	Independent	Neergaard II	
25		Christian Cold (1863–1934)	9 October 1922	23 April 1924	1 year, 197 days	Independent	Neergaard III	
26		Carl Moltke (1869–1935)	23 April 1924	14 December 1926	2 years, 235 days	Independent	Stauning I	
27		Laust Jevsen Moltesen (1865–1950)	14 December 1926	30 April 1929	2 years, 137 days	Venstre	Madsen-Mygdal	
28		Peter Rochegune Munch (1870–1948)	30 April 1929	8 July 1940	11 years, 69 days	Social Liberal	Stauning II–III–IV–V	
(21)		Erik Scavenius (1877–1962)	8 July 1940	29 August 1943	3 years, 52 days	Independent	Stauning VI; Buhl I Scavenius	
No Danish government in between August 29, 1943 and May 5, 1945. Office is assumed by the permanent secretary. (Note: On 29 August 1943, the Danish government resigned, refusing to grant further concessions to Nazi Germany. All government operations were assumed by the permanent secretaries of the individual departments, and this arrangement lasted until the Liberation of Denmark on 5 May 1945. Since King Christian X never accepted the resignation of the government, it existed de jure until a new cabinet was formed on 5 May 1945.)
–		Vilhelm Buhl (1881–1954) acting	5 May 1945	7 May 1945	2 days	Social Democrats	Buhl II	
29		John Christmas Møller (1894–1948)	7 May 1945	7 November 1945	184 days	Conservative	Buhl II	
30		Gustav Rasmussen (1895–1953)	7 November 1945	30 October 1950	4 years, 357 days	Independent	Kristensen; Hedtoft I–II	
30		Gustav Rasmussen (1895–1953)	7 November 1945	30 October 1950	4 years, 357 days	Social Democrats	Kristensen; Hedtoft I–II	

=== Ministers under Frederik IX (1947–1972) ===
No.	Portrait	Name (born–died)	Term of office			Political party	Government	Ref.
No.	Portrait	Name (born–died)	Took office	Left office	Time in office	Political party	Government	Ref.
31		Ole Bjørn Kraft (1893–1980)	30 October 1950	30 September 1953	2 years, 335 days	Conservative	Eriksen	
32		Hans Christian Hansen (1906–1960)	30 September 1953	8 October 1958	5 years, 8 days	Social Democrats	Hedtoft III; Hansen I–II	
33		Jens Otto Krag (1914–1978)	8 October 1958	3 September 1962	3 years, 330 days	Social Democrats	Hansen II; Kampmann I–II	
34		Per Hækkerup (1915–1979)	3 September 1962	28 November 1966	4 years, 86 days	Social Democrats	Krag I–II	
(33)		Jens Otto Krag (1914–1978)	28 November 1966	1 October 1967	307 days	Social Democrats	Krag II	
35		Hans Tabor (1922–2003)	1 October 1967	2 February 1968	124 days	Social Democrats	Krag II	
36		Poul Hartling (1914–2000)	2 February 1968	11 October 1971	3 years, 251 days	Venstre	Baunsgaard	
37		Knud Børge Andersen (1914–1984)	11 October 1971	19 December 1973	2 years, 69 days	Social Democrats	Krag III; Jørgensen I	

=== Ministers under Margrethe II (1972–2024) ===
No.	Portrait	Name (born–died)	Term of office			Political party	Government	Ref.
No.	Portrait	Name (born–died)	Took office	Left office	Time in office	Political party	Government	Ref.
38		Ove Guldberg (1918–2008)	19 December 1973	13 February 1975	1 year, 56 days	Venstre	Hartling	
(37)		Knud Børge Andersen (1914–1984)	13 February 1975	1 July 1978	3 years, 138 days	Social Democrats	Jørgensen II	
39		Anker Jørgensen (1922–2016)	1 July 1978	30 August 1978	60 days	Social Democrats	Jørgensen II	
40		Henning Christophersen (1939–2016)	30 August 1978	26 October 1979	1 year, 57 days	Venstre	Jørgensen III	
41		Kjeld Olesen (1932–2024)	26 October 1979	10 September 1982	2 years, 319 days	Social Democrats	Jørgensen IV–V	
42		Uffe Ellemann-Jensen (1941–2022)	10 September 1982	25 January 1993	10 years, 137 days	Venstre	Schlüter I–II–III–IV	
43		Niels Helveg Petersen (1939–2017)	25 January 1993	21 December 2000	7 years, 331 days	Social Liberal	P. N. Rasmussen I–II–III–IV	
44		Mogens Lykketoft (born 1946)	21 December 2000	27 November 2001	341 days	Social Democrats	P. N. Rasmussen IV	
45		Per Stig Møller (born 1942)	27 November 2001	23 February 2010	8 years, 88 days	Conservative	A. F. Rasmussen I–II–III; L. L. Rasmussen I	
46		Lene Espersen (born 1965)	23 February 2010	3 October 2011	1 year, 222 days	Conservative	L. L. Rasmussen I	
47		Villy Søvndal (born 1952)	3 October 2011	12 December 2013	2 years, 70 days	Green Left	Thorning-Schmidt I	
48		Holger K. Nielsen (born 1950)	12 December 2013	30 January 2014	49 days	Green Left	Thorning-Schmidt I	
49		Martin Lidegaard (born 1966)	30 January 2014	28 June 2015	1 year, 149 days	Social Liberal	Thorning-Schmidt II	
50		Kristian Jensen (born 1971)	28 June 2015	28 November 2016	1 year, 153 days	Venstre	L. L. Rasmussen II	
51		Anders Samuelsen (born 1967)	28 November 2016	27 June 2019	2 years, 211 days	Liberal Alliance	L. L. Rasmussen III	
52		Jeppe Kofod (born 1974)	27 June 2019	15 December 2022	3 years, 171 days	Social Democrats	Frederiksen I	
53		Lars Løkke Rasmussen (born 1964)	15 December 2022	Incumbent	3 years, 266 days	Moderates	Frederiksen II–III	
