= Monrad cabinet =

Danish Government Cabinet (1863-1864)

Monrad's cabinet
- 12th Cabinet of Denmark

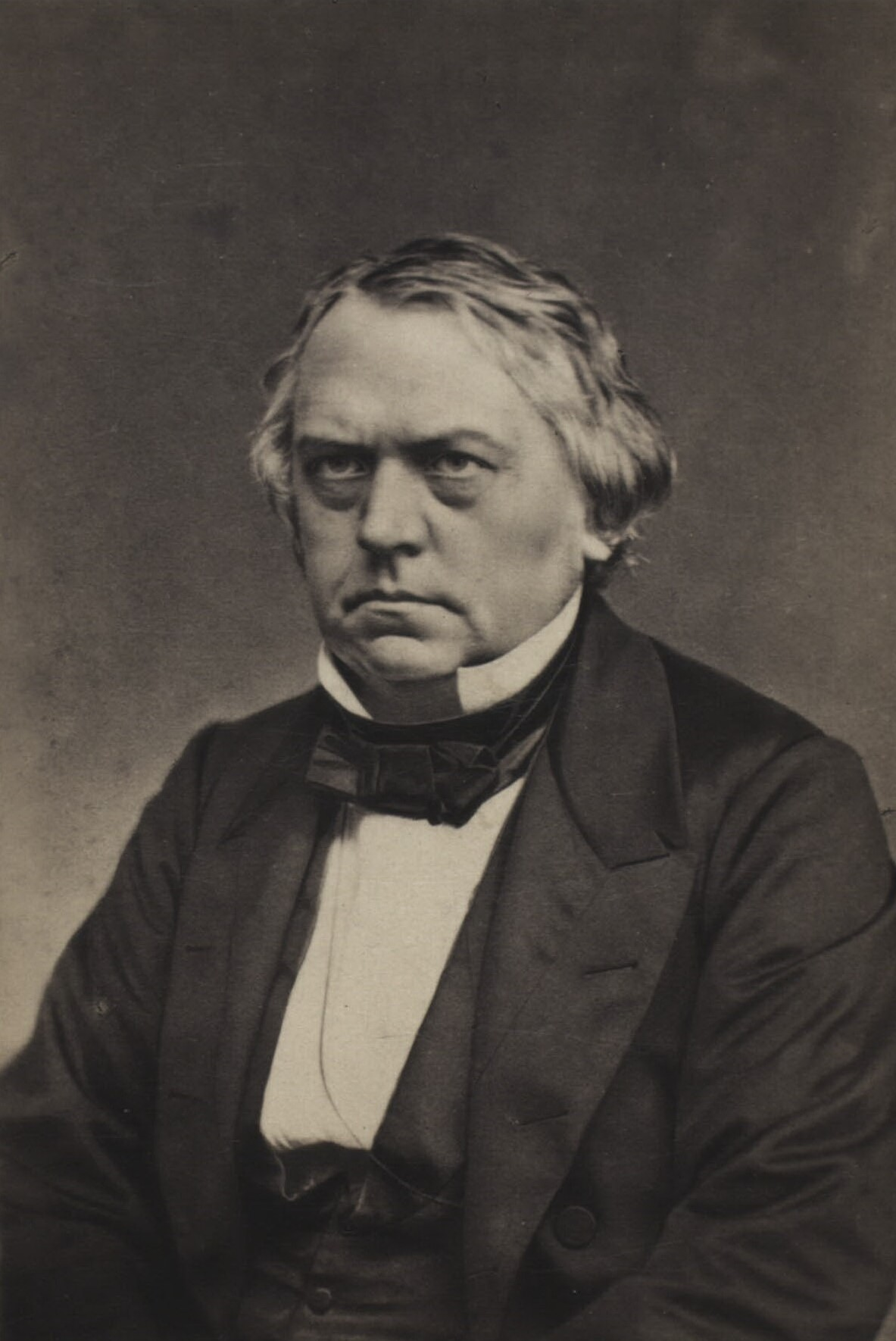
- Date formed: 31 December 1863
- Date dissolved: 11 July 1864

People and organisations
- Head of state: Christian IX
- Head of government: Ditlev Gothard Monrad

History
- Predecessor: Hall II
- Successor: Bluhme II

The Monrad cabinet was the government of Denmark from 31 December 1863 to 11 July 1864, and was in power in the beginning of the Second Schleswig War.

== List of ministers and portfolios ==
The cabinet consisted of these ministers:

Cabinet members
Portfolio	Minister	Took office	Left office
Council President, Minister for Finance & Minister for Holstein and Lauenburg	Ditlev Gothard Monrad	31 December 1863	11 July 1864
Minister of Foreign Affairs	Ditlev Gothard Monrad	31 December 1863	8 January 1864
Minister of Foreign Affairs	George Quaade	8 January 1864	11 July 1864
Minister of Justice	Andreas Lorentz Casse	31 December 1863	11 July 1864
Minister for Schleswig	Carl Simony	31 December 1863	24 January 1864
Minister for Schleswig	Christian Gottfried Johannsen	24 January 1864	11 July 1864
Minister of the Interior	Carl von Nutzhorn	31 December 1863	10 May 1864
Minister of the Interior	Hans Rasmussen Carlsen	10 May 1864	11 July 1864
Kultus Minister	Christian Thorning Engelstoft	31 December 1863	11 July 1864
Minister of War	Carl Lundbye	13 August 1863	15 May 1864
Minister of War	Christian Emilius Reich	15 May 1864	11 July 1864
Minister of the Navy	Otto Hans Lütken	31 December 1863	11 July 1864

Preceded by Hall II	Cabinet of Denmark; 31 December 1863 – 11 July 1864	Succeeded by Bluhme II
