= Laust Jevsen Moltesen =

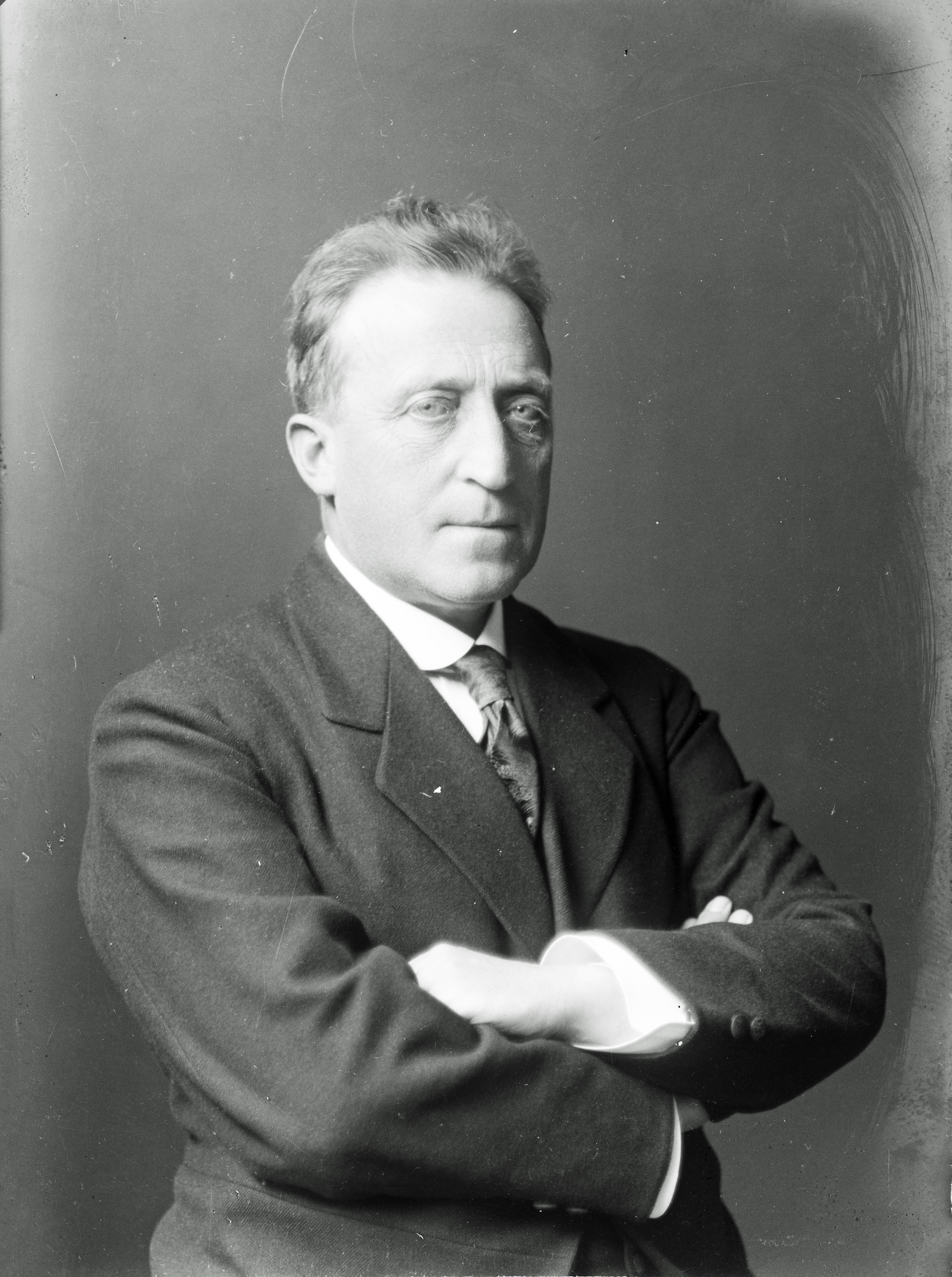
- Moltesen in 1919

Minister of Foreign Affairs
- In office 14 December 1926 – 30 April 1929
- Prime Minister: Thomas Madsen-Mygdal
- Preceded by: Carl Moltke
- Succeeded by: Peter Munch

Personal details
- Born: 18 November 1865 Råhede, Denmark
- Died: 25 October 1950 (aged 84) Ordrup, Denmark
- Party: Venstre.

Laust Jevsen Moltesen (18 November 1865 – 25 October 1950) was a Danish educated church historian and Venstre politician. He served as Foreign Minister of Denmark from 1926 to 1929.

== Biography ==
Moltesen was born in Råhede in Hviding Parish, to farmer Peter Moltesen and his wife Bodil, née Lauritzen. Hviding was located on the northern extremity of Northern Schleswig, a region Denmark had surrendered to Prussia the year before his birth, and consequently his father purchased a second farm in Brørup north of the new border, to ensure that his children could attend a Danish school. Educated in theology at the University of Copenhagen, he made large contributions as a church historian, and supported the thoughts of N. F. S. Grundtvig. After studies in Hamburg and the Netherlands, he published a biography of Frederik Brekling in 1890. As a result of studies in Rome in 1894 and 1895, he wrote De Avignonske Pavers Forhold til Danmark (1896), concerning the relationship between the Avignon Papacy and Denmark, for which he obtained the doctorate. He also wrote Det kristne Munkevæsen, dets Oprindelse og første Udvikling (1901) and Acta Pontificum Danica, 1316-78 volume I, (1904).

Moltesen married Finnish zoologist and writer Eva Elisabeth Hällström. Their son, Erik Moltesen, became a notable cultural historian. They had three other children together, Per Algot Moltesen (1900–1980), who became a diplomat, Bodil Elisabeth Relander (1901–1992) and Harald Moltesen (1905–1931).

In 1909, Moltesen was elected in Vinderup to the Danish Folketing for Venstre. He left the political life in 1918, but re-entered the Folketing in 1920, elected in Holstebro. After World War I, he served as one of the Danish delegates to the League of Nations. From 1926 to 1929, he served as Foreign Minister of Denmark, in the Venstre cabinet of Thomas Madsen-Mygdal. Venstre lost the 1929 election, and Moltesen was replaced by Peter Rochegune Munch as Foreign Minister. Moltesen continued as a Folketing member, and was the head of the parliamentary Council on Foreign Affairs until 1932, when he resigned due to disagreement with the military policies of the government.

Political offices
| Preceded by Carl Moltke | Foreign Minister of Denmark; 14 December 1926 – 30 April 1929 | Succeeded by Peter Rochegune Munch |
