= Ole Bjørn Kraft =

Danish journalist and politician (1893–1980)

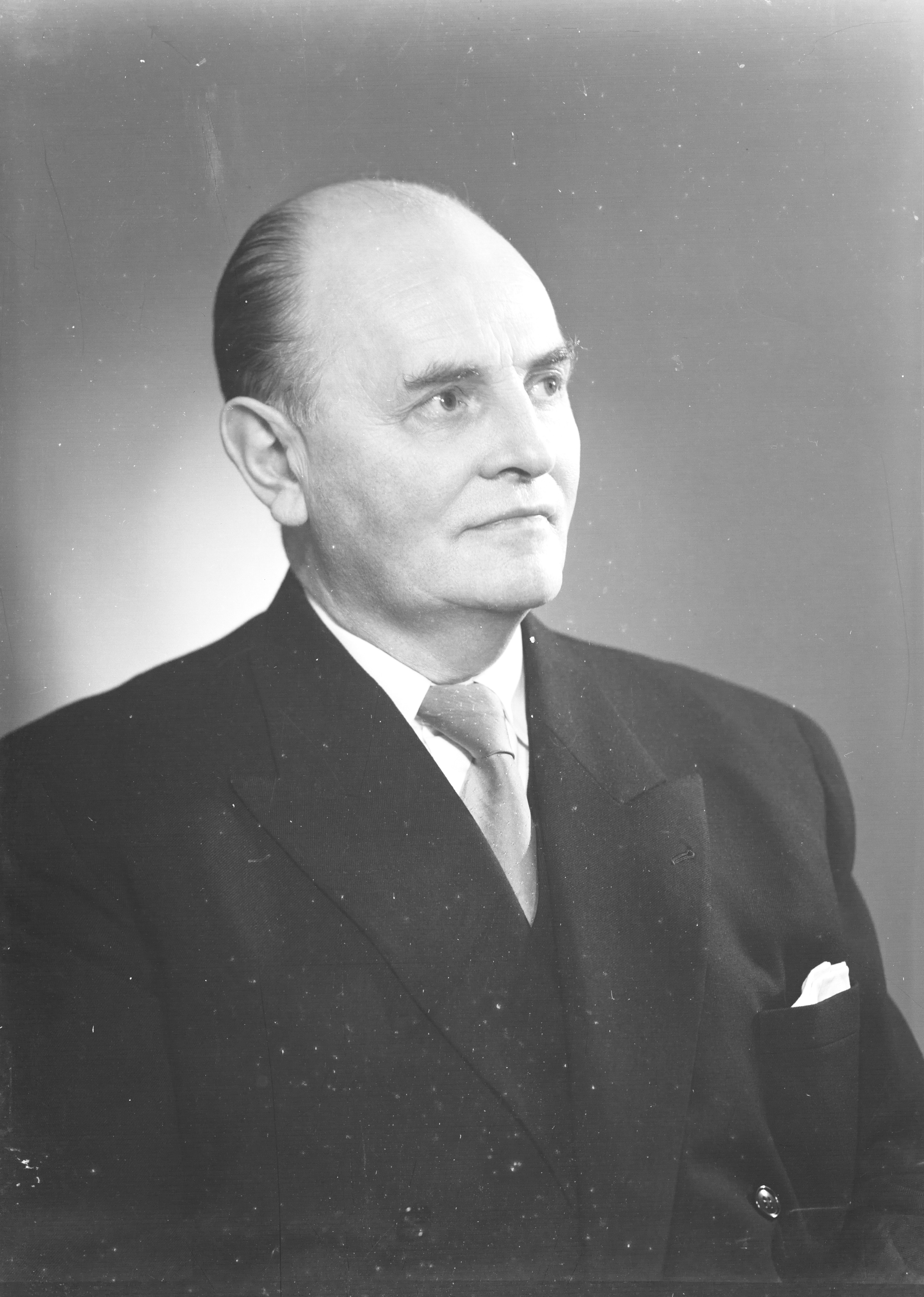

Minister of Foreign Affairs
- In office 1950–1953
- Prime Minister: Erik Eriksen

Minister of Defense
- In office 1945–1945
- Prime Minister: Vilhelm Buhl

Personal details
- Born: 17 December 1893 Copenhagen
- Died: 2 December 1980 (aged 86)
- Party: Conservative People's Party
- Profession: Journalist

Ole Bjørn Kraft (17 December 1893 – 2 December 1980) was a Danish journalist and politician who was the leader of the Conservative People's Party. He also served as the minister of foreign affairs.

== Early life ==
Kraft was born in Copenhagen on 17 December 1893. He studied journalism at the University of Copenhagen. He and Max Kjaer-Hansen, his friend from the University of Copenhagen, formed the West Indian Society of Danish Academics to reinforce the protests over the sale of Virgin Islands. Although their attempt was not a success, it paved the way for the establishment of the Det unge Danmark (Danish: The Young Denmark). The group was established just before World War I and supported imperialistic, ethno-nationalist and anti-liberal views.

== Career ==
Kraft began his career as a journalist. In 1918 he edited a magazine entitled Det nye Tid which was affiliated with the Det unge Danmark. From May 1919 he worked for Århus Stiftstidende. Then he worked for other newspapers, including Svendborg Amts Dagblad, Nationaltidendes Søndag and Fædrelandet. Between 1928 and 1932 and between 1934 and 1938 he was the editor of another magazine entitled Det nye Danmark which he co-founded with the theologian Alfred Bindslev.

Kraft joined the Conservative People's Party. In 1926 he was first elected to the Parliament representing Ålborg and functioned as the leader of the Conservative People's Party at the Parliament. In 1945 Kraft briefly served as the minister of defense. In November 1947 he was elected as the political leader of the Conservative People's Party, and under his leadership the party supported the right-wing policies. Kraft was a member of the Danish Committee of the European Movement which was established after the Congress of Europe organized in The Hague on 7–9 May 1948. The Danish Committee was founded on 11 August and headed by Thorkil Kristensen.

In 1950 Kraft was named as the foreign minister to the cabinet formed by Prime Minister Erik Eriksen. Kraft remained in the office until 1953. When Kraft was in office Denmark objected to the admission of Greece and Turkey into NATO, and Kraft stated that although these countries had legitimate security concerns, a Mediterranean pact could be establish by them to meet their security needs. Eventually, Denmark voted against acceptance of these countries by NATO as full members. In 1955 Kraft's term as the political leader of the Conservative People's Party ended, and Aksel Møller succeeded him in the post. Kraft was a contributor of Berlingske Tidende and a member of the Parliament until 1964.

== Personal life and death ==
Kraft married in Aarhus in May 1919. He died on 2 December 1980.

He published his memoirs entitled Ung mand undervejs.

=== Views ===
At the beginning of his political career Kraft's views were based on Christianity and national idealism. He objected to the sale of the Virgin Islands to the US in 1916. He was among the admirers of the Italian fascism arguing that its corporative ideas should be integrated into the Danish constitution. He also stated that not all Danes were the same in that some of them were more truly Danish than others. Kraft was an observer at the 1966 meeting of the World Anti-Communist League.

== See also ==
- List of foreign ministers in 1950
