= Ludvig Nicolaus von Scheele =

Danish politician (1796–1874)

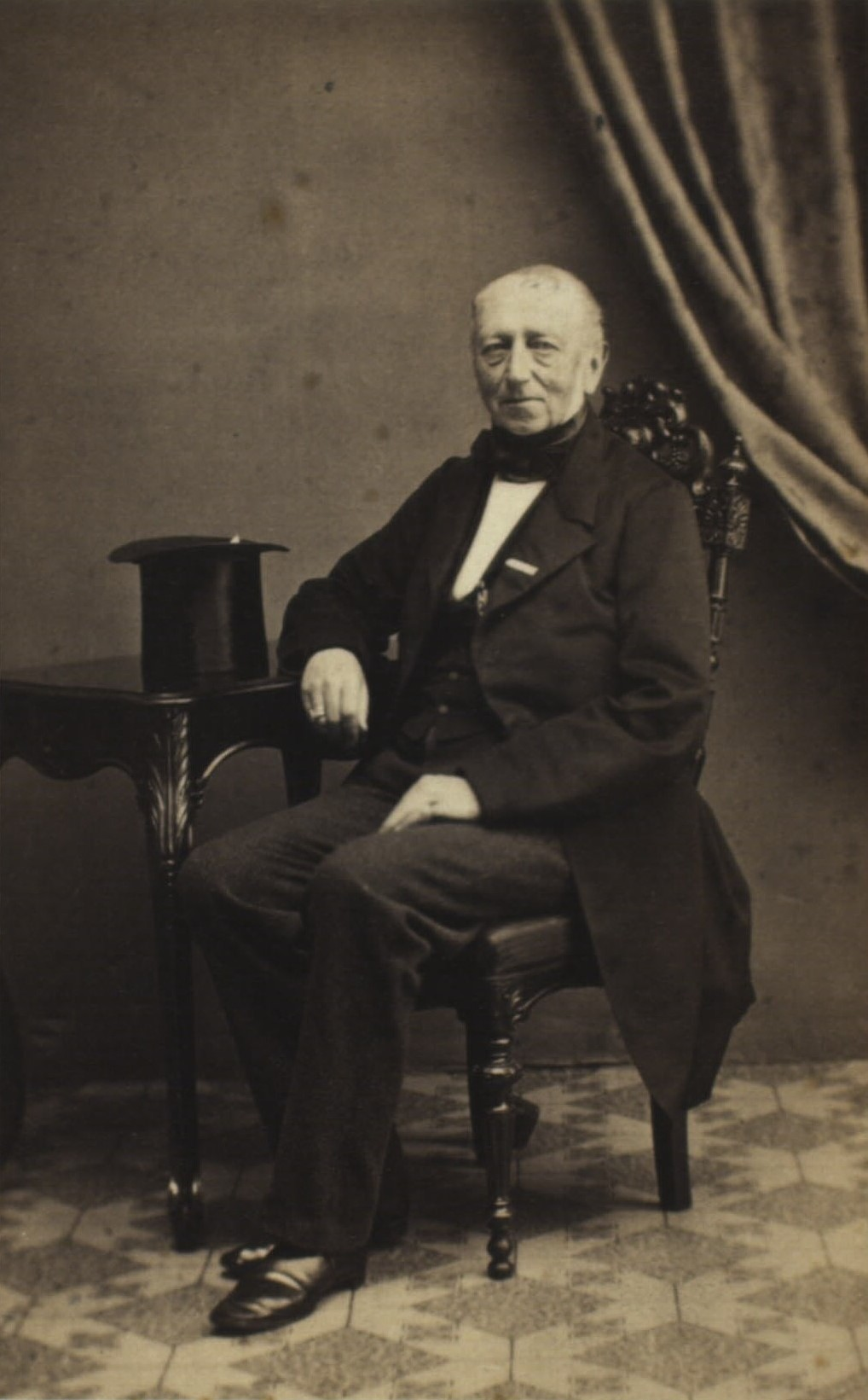
- Born: Ludvig Nicolaus Scheele (till 1855); 14 October 1796; Itzehoe, Holstein
- Died: 1 January 1874 (aged 77); Copenhagen, Denmark
- Education: Kiel; Göttingen
- Occupation: politician/statesman
- Spouse: Sarah Margarethe Markoe (1806–1876)
- Parent(s): Benedictus "Bendix" Ferdinand Scheel (1749–1827); Martha Charlotte Elisabeth Wiebel (1760–1837)

Ludvig Nicolaus von Scheele (14 October 1796 – 1 January 1874) was a Danish statesman, serving as Danish Foreign Minister between 1855 and 1857. A political conservative, he also held several senior government positions in Schleswig-Holstein.

== Life ==
=== Provenance and early years ===
Scheele was born in Itzehoe, at that time in Holstein. His father was a customs officer who rose to become a Lieutenant Colonel, Benedict "Bendix" Ferdinand von Scheel (1749–1827). An uncle was Lieutenant General Heinrich Otto von Scheel (1745–1808). After several years at school in Hamburg he enrolled as a student at Kiel in 1816, emerging in 1821 with a Glückstadt law degree. In 1822 he took an internship in government service, by 1824 employed as a trainee. In 1827 he was sent as a regional administrator to Hütten, promoted in 1831. Meanwhile, in 1829 he became a chamberlain and in 1845 a Commander of the Order of the Dannebrog, having won the favour of King Christian VIII as an evidently loyal government official opposed to separatist tendencies in Schleswig-Holstein.

Prince Frederick, the king's cousin, had been removed from his governorship of Schleswig-Holstein as a consequence of his active separatist involvement, and von Scheele was installed as regional head of government. In 1847 he was awarded the Grand Cross of the Order of the Dannebrog. However, his approach made him unpopular, notably with ethnic Germans who made up the majority population in much of the region, and in March 1848 he had to flee in the face of the uprising that became the First Schleswig War. He was able to make his way through to Copenhagen where the new king, Frederick VII, who was already a personal friend, made him a privy counsellor. During 1850/51 he published a book under the title "Fragmente in zwanglosen Heften", advocating a modern constitution for Denmark and backing "civil liberties" ("kommunalfrihed"). In July 1850 was invited by Prime Minister Fritz Tillisch to take on administration of a region of Schleswig-Holstein embracing Gottorp, Husum and Hütten, which at that time were occupied by Danish troops, but after careful consideration von Scheele rejected the offer. Despite his conservative anti-separatist record he was highly critical of the language reform proposals of Fritz Tillisch, calling for equal treatment of German and Danish in linguistically mixed districts. In 1852 Scheele was appointed regional governor ("Landdrost") for Pinneberg, and the next year royal commissioner to the Holstein parliament, strongly opposing Schleswig-Holstein separatism.

=== National politics ===
In 1852 the king admitted von Scheele to the Order of the Elephant, Denmark's highest public honour. Through his close personal relationship with the king von Scheele played an important part in bringing about the fall of the Ørsted government in December 1854. The period was one of heightened political turmoil, driven by tensions between ethnic Germans and ethnic Danes at a time of growing nationalist awareness. During 1853 the Ørsted-Bluhme government found itself entering into a state of confrontation with the parliament ("Rigsdagen") after the leadership appeared minded to reduce the authority of the parliament and accord to the king the power to agree and issue the constitution which was needed to satisfy the aspirations that had been crystallised across Europe in 1848 and to deal with the peculiarly Danish issue of the seemingly irreconcilable political status of the bilingual and bicultural Schleswig-Holstein region in the south of the country. For leading liberals such as A. F. Tscherning and C. C. Hall, von Scheele now emerged as a pivotal figure, combining well known conservative instincts with an element of pragmatism with regard to constitutional matters that was not on display from the government. Unusually among the leading politicians, Scheele was also a close friend both of the king and of Countess Danner, the king's "morganatic" wife. The government issued the constitution on 26 July 1854 without sufficient consultation which unleashed a storm of protest from national liberal and democratic elements. The king was himself uneasy over the inflexibility demonstrated by the Ørsted government, and during a visit to Schleswig and Holstein in October 1854 the king and Scheele agreed to move against the Ørsted government. Scheele had already visited Berlin to discuss the matter with the Prussian Foreign Minister, Otto Theodor von Manteuffel, and received the clear message that the Prussian government wished for a swift resolution of the gathering constitutional crisis in southern Denmark. (Berlin had a clear interest in the matter especially since, unlike the rest of Denmark, Schleswig and Holstein had been part of the Holy Roman Empire before 1806.) It was not just the king who was uneasy about the government's behaviour and Ørsted was forced to resign the premiership at the end of 1854. The king now invited Scheele to form a new government. There followed a complex set of negotiations among the leading politicians and in the end Scheele concluded that he would not be able to lead the new government which instead emerged under the leadership of Peter Georg Bang. There was no party structure in the twentieth century sense, but it is reasonable to view the Bang government as a coalition between moderate liberals and pragmatic conservatives.

Early in 1855 Scheele endorsed the implementation of the new constitution and joined the Bang government as minister for Holstein and secretary of state for foreign affairs. The government contained some disparate elements. Bang was not a "natural politician" and Scheele himself frequently lacked the patience normally associated with successful negotiation, but to some extent he made up for that with his mastery of detail and persuasive personality in the Rigsdagen, and the constitution finally became effective on 2 October 1855. Scheele received congratulations from the governments in Berlin and Vienna. As Minister for Holstein Scheele now increasingly ran into opposition from the powerful land-owner class, however, with his proposals to reduce their tax privileges and abolish their privileged status before the courts. There were also increasingly fevered arguments over sustaining currency harmonisation with the German confederation. Although he successfully fought off serious legal challenges in the courts, discontent over the constitution returned to the political agenda, and by the time the Bang government fell in February 1857, it appears that von Scheele's political capital was for most purposes exhausted.

In February 1857 von Scheele caused a stir by sending a letter to various foreign governments in which he dismissed the ideas for a "Nordic union" (which were then being floated by the Swedes) as a completely impractical "poetic idyll" ("poetisk idé"). Oscar I, the Swedish king, was moved to withdraw his offer of a "defence union", which was in any case problematic because it would have excluded Holstein, which was subject to additional risks and pressures.
