= Johanna Sundberg =

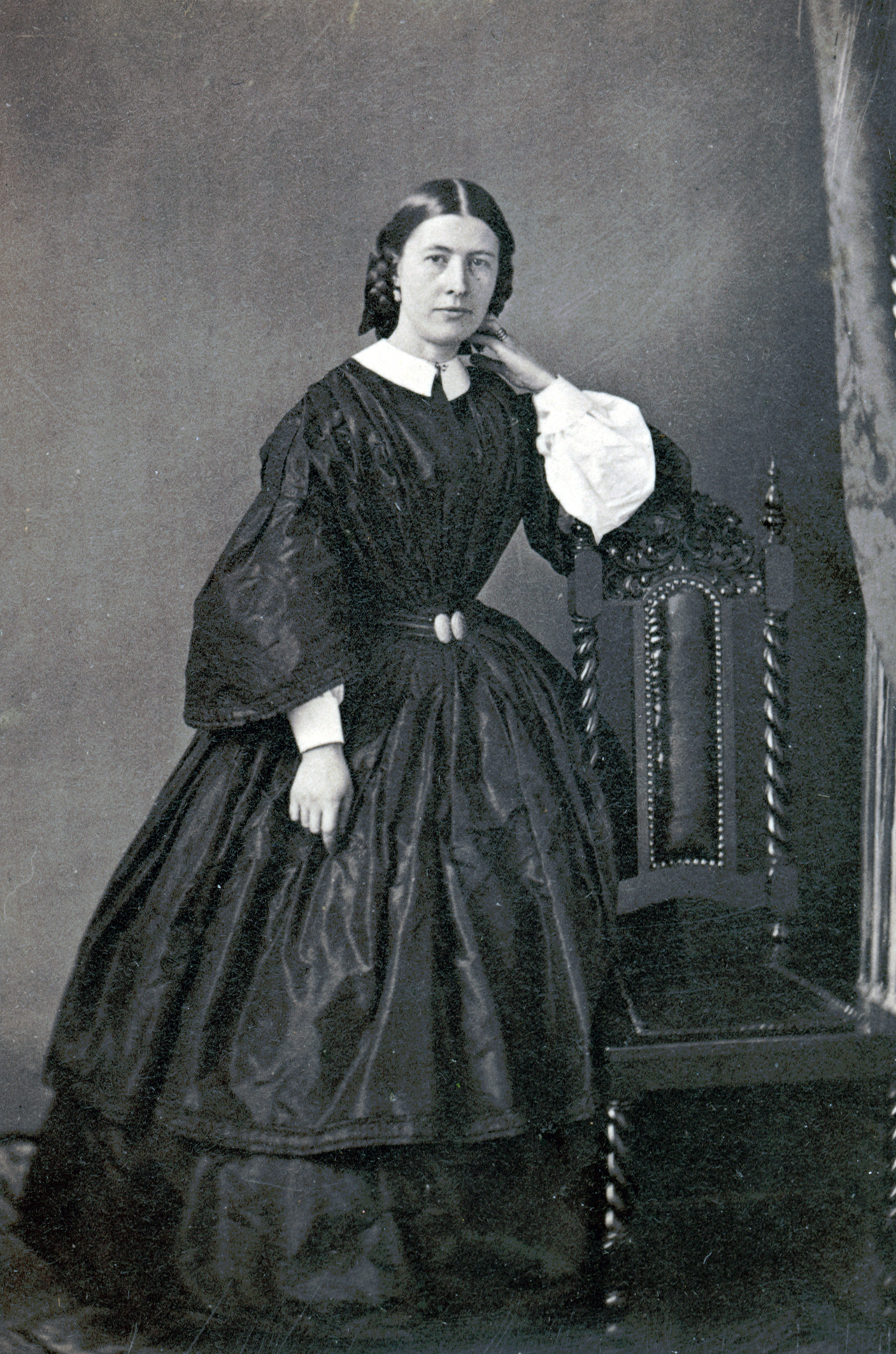
Johanna Sundberg

Johanna Gustafva Sundberg also known as Johanna Gillberg (20 January 1828 – 18 February 1910) was a Swedish ballerina and ballet teacher. She was a star of the Royal Swedish Ballet in the mid-19th century.

== Life ==
Johanna Sundberg was born and died in Stockholm.

In 1836, she was enrolled in the Royal Swedish Ballet at the Royal Swedish Opera as the student of Sophie Daguin and Per Erik Wallqvist at the age of nine. She made her debut as a solo dancer in 1838. She made her breakthrough in En karnevalsafton by Anders Selinder. In 1847, she was a student of August Bournonville at the Royal Danish Ballet in Copenhagen and, alongside Charlotte Norberg, was often requested by August Bournonville during his guest performances in Stockholm.

She retired in 1866 but was active as an instructor for many years afterward.

She married the actor Carl Gustaf Sundberg in 1851.
