= Adolfina Fägerstedt =

Swedish ballerina

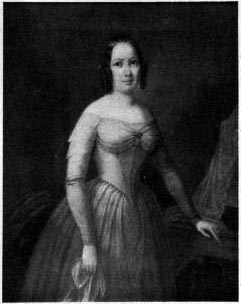

Adolfina Fägerstedt (31 August 1811 – 1902), was a Swedish ballerina. She was considered as one of the leading members of the Royal Swedish Ballet in the 1830s and 1840s.

She became a student of the Royal Swedish Ballet in 1821, a figurante in 1827, and a premier dancer (ballerina) from 1831 to 1844 and at that point regarded as a leading member of the Swedish ballet. In the 1830s, she is referred to as one of the most notable female members of the Royal Swedish Ballet alongside Sophie Daguin, Carolina Granberg and Charlotta Alm.

Among her roles where the favorite sultana in the pantomime ballet Paschan och slafvinnan by Anders Selinder with Peter Håkansson, the sister in Hemkomsten by August Bournonville with Per Christian Johansson and Sophie Daguin, one of the Three Graces with Carolina Granberg and Charlotta Ek in Ett mythologiskt divertissement by Selinder, and a Pas de cinq with Daguin, Charlotte Norberg, Carolina Friebel and the French guest artist François Lefèbvre.

The chronicler and theater historian said of her:

"mamsell Adolfina Fägerstedt, ballerina 1831—1844, who had numerous admirers, even some very powerful ones and, when she died in 1902 in an age over ninety, left an astounding home, filled with old silver and a magnificent coffee set of genuine china. Her aging housekeeper, to whom she had willed everything, died shortly after as well, and her 80,000 kronor as well as the magnificent furnishings where dispersed among the peasantry of Roslagen."

== Sources ==
- Nils Personne: Svenska teatern : några anteckningar 7. Under Karl Johanstiden : 1835-1838
- Fredrik August Dahlgren: Förteckning öfver svenska skådespel uppförda på Stockholms theatrar 1737-1863 och Kongl. Theatrarnes personal 1773-1863. Med flera anteckningar.
