= Badstuestræde 18 =

Building in Copenhagen, Denmark

Badstuestræde
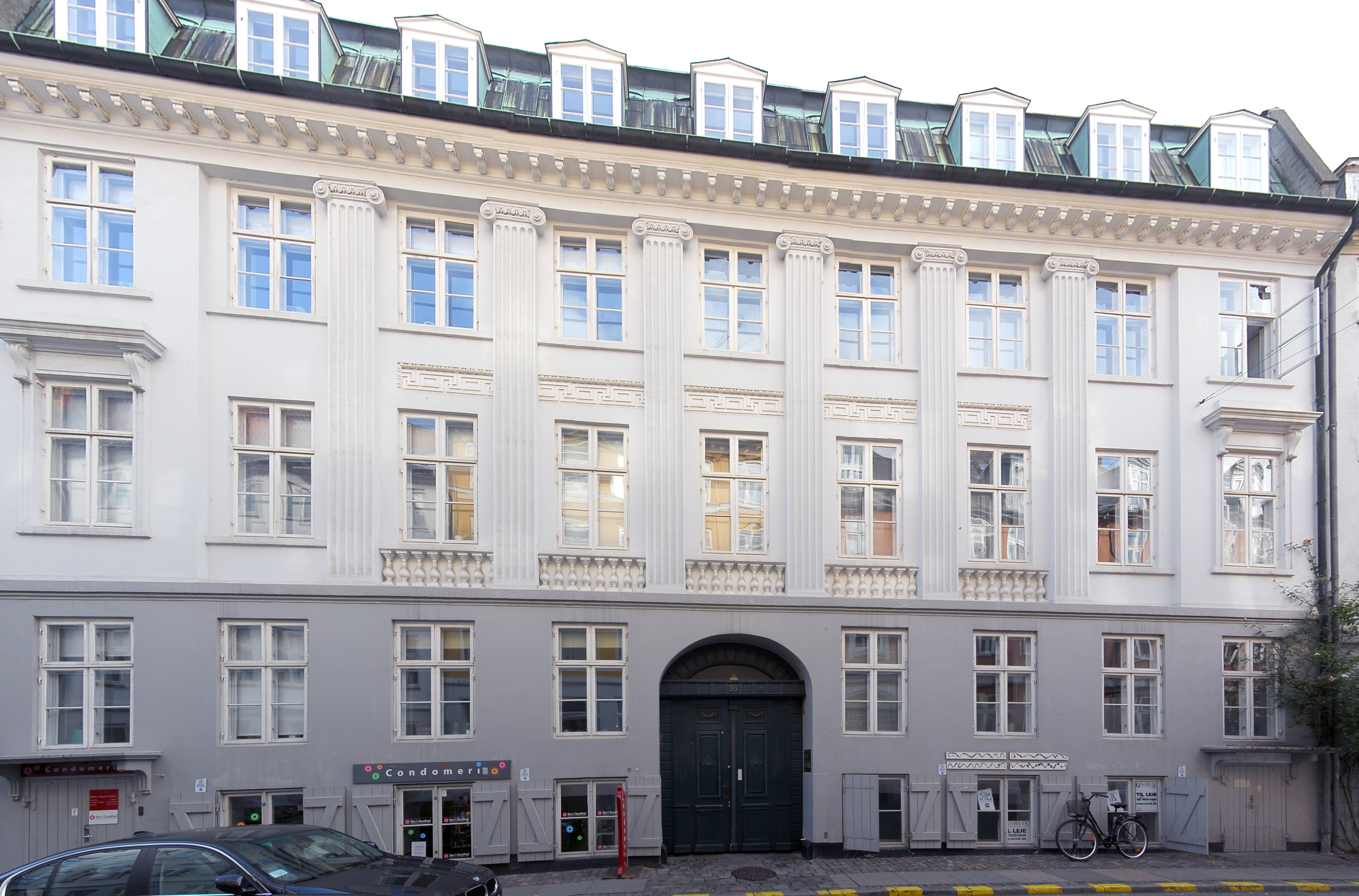
- Interactive map of the Badstuestræde area

General information
- Architectural style: Neoclassical
- Location: Copenhagen, Denmark
- Coordinates: 55°40′40.09″N 12°34′32.02″E
- Completed: 1797

Badstuestræde 18 is a Neoclassical property in Badstuestræde in the Old Town of Copenhagen, Denmark, constructed for brewer Peter Møller as part of the rebuilding of the city following the Copenhagen Fire of 1795. It was listed in the Danish registry of protected buildings and places in 1918. Notable former residents include the philologist Jacob Baden, actor Peter Jørgen Frydendahl, ballet master Carl Dahlén, actress and opera singer Johanna Elisabeth Dahlén and later ballet master of the Royal Swedish Ballet, Sigurd Harald Lund.

== History ==
=== 18th century ===
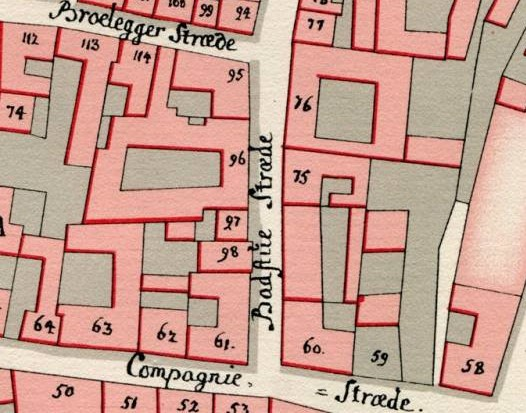
No. 96 seen on Gedde's district map of Snaren's Quarter from 1757

The site was formerly part of three separate properties. The central part of the site was listed in Copenhagen's first cadastre of 1689 as No. 112 in Snaren's Quarter and belonged to turner Peder Hansen at that time. It was later expanded with part of No. 111 and No. 113. This larger property was listed in the new cadastre of 1756 as No. 96 and belonged to brewer Jens Andersen Møller.

=== Møller and his tenants ===
The property was later acquired by flour merchant Peter Møller. His property was home to 16 residents in two households at the 1887 census. The owner resided in the building with his wife Anne Magdalene Lucas, their three children (aged 10 to 14), two brewery workers, two caretakers and two maids. Jacob Baden, a professor of philology at the University of Copenhagen, resided in the other dwelling with his wife Sophie Lovise Charlotte Klenov, their 19-year-old son Jacob Baden, one male servant and one maid.

Møller's property was destroyed in the Copenhagen Fire of 1795, together with most of the other buildings in the area. The present building on the site was constructed for him in 1796–1797. One of the first tenants in the building was the priest Christian Bastholm (1740–1819).

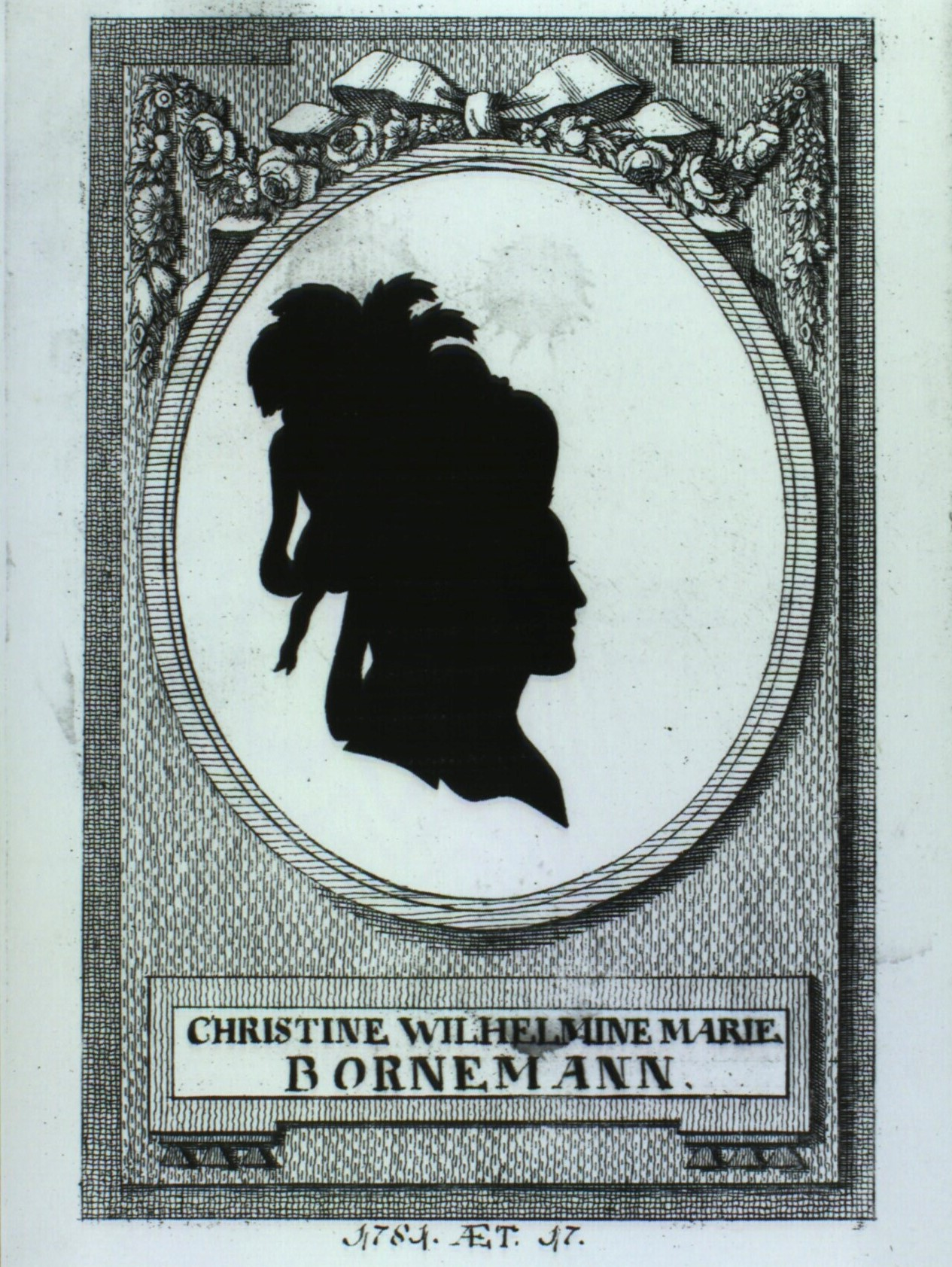
Wilhelmine Zeuthen

The property was home to 36 residents in four households at the time of the 1801 census. Peder Møller resided in the building with three of his two sons (aged 24 and 26, a granddaughter (aged 12), a niece, a brewer (employee), two apprentices, a caretaker and a maid. Johan Gotfried Struch, a grocer whose grocery shop was located in the basement, resided in the building with a grocer's apprentice, the 57-year-old chamberlain Gustav Bille, Bille's servant, a coachman and a workman. Lauritz Leth, inspector of Copenhagen Fire Corps, resided in the building with his wife Anna Dorothea Ulr. Eleonore Bang, their daughters aged 17 and 19), 18-year-old Cecilia Kolstrup, two lodgers and two maids. Peter Christian Zeuthen (1855–1823), director of Enkekassen and the owner of Tølløsegård, Søgaard and Sonnerupgård, resided in the building with his wife Wilhelmine Marie Zeuthen (née Bornemann, 1875–1802, daughter of police master Vilhelm Bornemann), their four sons (aged three to 15), a tutor, a male servant, a housekeeper, a female cook and a maid.

Møller's property was listed in the new cadastre of 1806 as No. 124 in Snaren's Quarter. He was now not just registered as brewer but also as captain, probably in the Copenhagen Fire Corps or the Civilian Guard (Borgervæbningen). Actor at the Royal Danish Theatre Peter Jørgen Frydendahl (1766–1836) was a resident during the period of 1811–1813.

=== later history ===
Second ballet master at the Royal Danish Theatre Carl Dahlén and the actress Johanna Elisabeth Dahlén lived on the first floor in the early 1820s. Carl Dahlén accepted a young Hans Christian Andersen as a ballet student in 1821. Andersen often visited his home in Badstuestræde.

The property was home to 34 residents at the 1840 census. Marcus Valentin (1798–1855), a textile merchant, resided on the ground floor with his wife Rebekka Weilm their four children and one maid. Christian Lund, an actor at the Royal Danish Theatre, resided on the first floor to the left with his wife Catherine Hekkel and their seven children (aged three to 19). The two eldest daughters Helga Rinda Lund and Alvilde Gothilde Lund were both dancers at the theatre. The son Sigurd Harald Lund trained under August Bournonville and would later become ballet master of the Royal Swedish Ballet. Johan Andersen, a musical instrument maker, resided on the first floor to the right with his wife Fredericke Bærentzen and one maid. Herman Stahl, a roof maker (Tagfabriquant(m resided on the second floor with his wife Hedevig Rose, their seven-year-old daughter, his sister-in-law Louise Rose, one maid and one lodger. Johan Fredederik Larsen (workman) and Moritz Levin (Candidatus Philosophiæ) two lodgers resided in the garret. Knud Rasmussen, a workman, resided in the basement with his wife Anne Dorthea Hansen, their two children (aged three and 19), another workman and a maid.

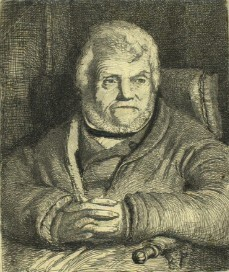
Andreas Friderich Werlin

The property was home to 61 residents in eight households at the 1845 census. Marcus Valentin was now resident in one of the two second floor apartments with his wife, four of their children /aged three to 11(, 33-year-old 3628 and two maids. Georgia Betty Theodosia Sørensen (née Paarup), widow of a justitsrådm resided in the other second floor apartment with her seven children (aged six to 18 and one maid). Wicent David Gottlieb, a harbour inspector, resided in one of the first floor apartments with Harald and E Lovise (aged 27 and 34) and one maid. Andreas Frederik Werliin, a house building painter, resided in the other first floor apartment with his wife Inger Werliin (née Trane), four children (aged 24 to 28), a painter's apprentice and a maid. Christian Michael Schouw, a senior clerk in the Copenhagen Police Force, resided on the ground floor to the left with his wife Frautiska Sara Sophie født Daus, their three children (aged one to six) and two lodgers. Jørgen Diderik Qvist, a book printer, resided on the ground floor to the right with his wife Vilhelmine Carolin Møller and one maid. Frederik Jensen, a tailor, resided in the garret with his wife Augusta Hansen and their one-year-old son. Emma Kornbeik, a 56-year-old woman whose husband was in America, resided on the first floor of the side wing with her four children (aged 14 to 229. Frederik Ludvig Aagaard, a master shoemaker, resided in the basement with his wife Charlotte Amalie Hald, two shoemakers (employees) and an apprentice.

The attorney Gustav Edvard Brock was a resident in the building from 1849 to 1856. He served as public prosecutor in the impeachment against the Cabinet of Ørsted-Bluhme while he lived in the building.

The property was home to 28 residents at the 1860 census. Marcus Falk Valentin's son Moses Marcus Velentin (aged 27), who was now himself a businessman (grosserer), resided in one of the ground floor apartments with the coachman Christen Peter Momsen and one servant.Jørgen Diderik Qvist, the now 71-year-old book printer, resided on the ground floor with his wife and one maid. Peter Ludvig Møller, a tailor, resided on the first floor with his wife Emilie Møller, their nine-year-old son Olaf Isted Møllerm two maids and one lodger (jurist at the Police Court). Michael Meyer, a building painter, resided in the other first floor apartment with his wife Fromme Meyer, their infant Jacob Meyer, a wet nurse and a maid. Sally Levy, a Jewish businessman (grosserer), resided on the second floor with his wife Georgine Levy, their three children (aged one to four), two maids and the businessman (grosserer) Wulff Davidsen (lodger). Elina Sünckenberg, a 66-year-old widow, resided in the other second floor apartment with her 33-year-old daughter Laura Sünckenberg and one maid.

=== 20th century ===
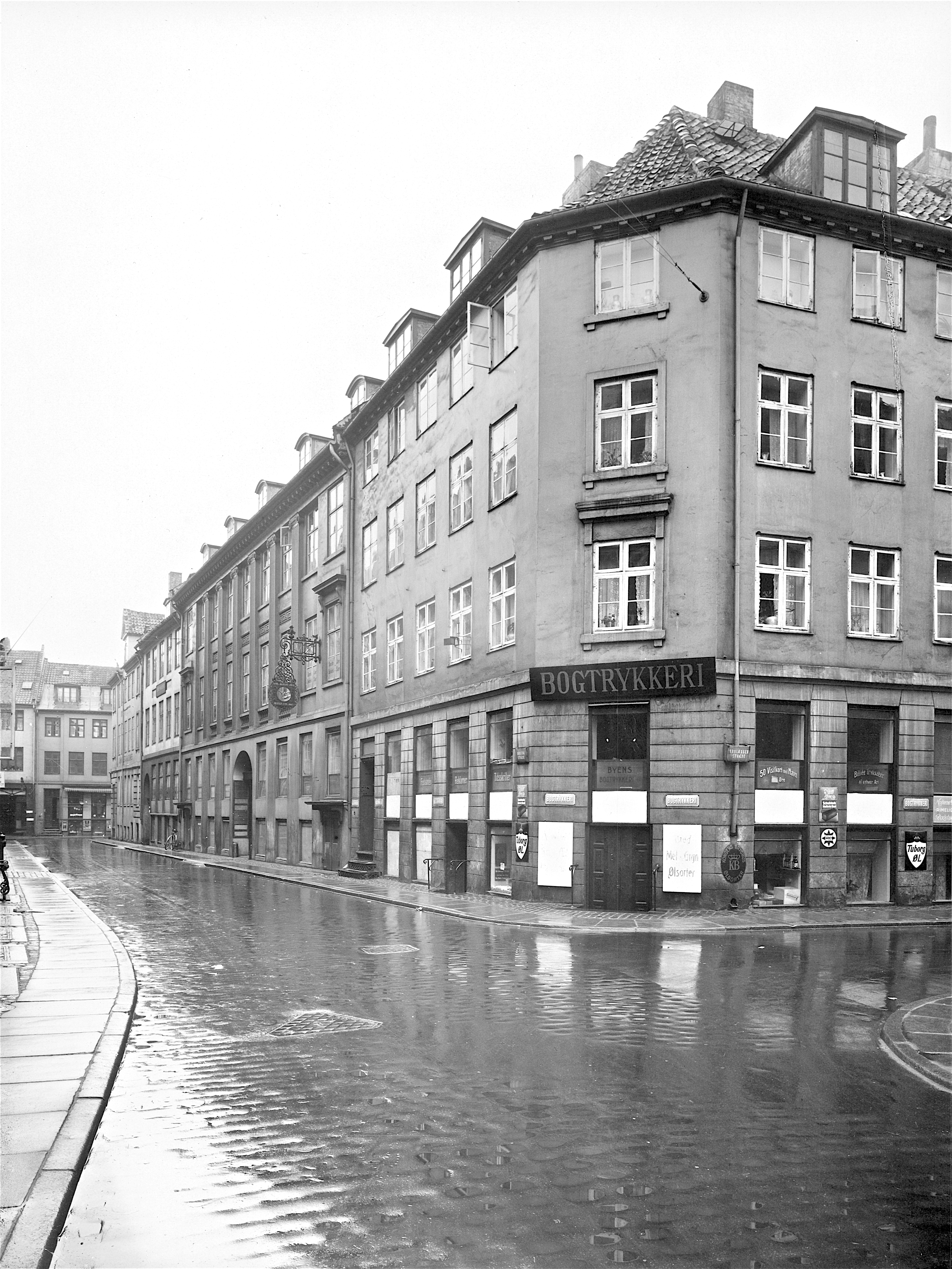
Badstuestræde 18.

Carl Seifert, a manufacturer of armed doors and gates, owned the building in around 1940. The company is now based in Ballerup. Erik Myrdahls Bogtrykkeri, a printing business, was based in the building from 1935 to 1982.

Reuthers Bureau was later based in the front wing. A number of craftsmen were based in the rear wings. In 2007, Bafstuestræde 18 was converted into 16 apartments, with assistance from Gottlieb Paludan Architects.

== Architecture ==
The building was likely designed by a pupil of Caspar Frederik Harsdorff. The facade is decorated with six Ionic pilasters.

== Today ==
In 2007, Bafstuestræde 18 was converted into 16 apartments, with assistance from Gottlieb Paludan Architects. A 250 square metre roof terrace was installed on top of the rear wing. The basement contains 10 parking spots.
