= Carolina Granberg =

Swedish ballerina

Carolina Desideria Granberg also known as Carolina Friebel (Stockholm, 31 March 1818 - 2 October 1884), was a Swedish ballerina. She was considered as one of the leading members of the Royal Swedish Ballet.

She became a student of Sophie Daguin at the Royal Swedish Ballet in 1834, and was a premier dancer (ballerina) from 1838 to 1855 and at that point regarded as a leading member of the Swedish ballet. In the 1830s, she is referred to as one of the most notable female members of the Royal Swedish Ballet alongside Sophie Daguin, Adolfina Fägerstedt and Charlotta Alm. She was known as Caroline Friebel after her marriage to Friedrich Moritz Friebel, a musician of the Hovkapellet, in 1840. During the guest performance of Marie Taglioni in Stockholm in 1841, she was reportedly given tuition by her. She retired in 1855 with a full royal pension, a privilege which was not a given thing at that time.

Among her parts where one of the Three Graces with Adolfina Fägerstedt and Charlotta Ek in Ett mythologiskt divertissement by Anders Selinder, in which Selinder played Apollo, Sophie Daguin Venus and Charlotta Norberg Love; a part in the ballet Robert opposite Daguin and Christian Johansson; a Pas de cinq with Sophie Daguin, Charlotte Norberg, Adolfina Fägerstedt and the French guest artist François Lefèbvre as well as a béarnaise toward Lefèbvre; and her performance of the so called »la Cachucha», which was her contribution in a medley performance at the opera.

She is described as "the Sylphic mrs Friebel" and referred to have been "one of our most excellent dancers and excelled in among other things a cachucha composed by Fanny Elssler."

== Sources ==
- Fredrik August Dahlgren: Förteckning öfver svenska skådespel uppförda på Stockholms theatrar 1737-1863 och Kongl. Theatrarnes personal 1773-1863. Med flera anteckningar.
- Nils Personne: Svenska teatern : några anteckningar 7. Under Karl Johanstiden : 1835-1838
