= André Isidore Carey =

French ballet dancer

André Isidore Carey (c. 1790, Paris – ?) was a French ballet dancer. A student of Auguste Vestris, he arrived in Stockholm in 1815 as premier danseur in the Royal Swedish Ballet until 1823. He débuted in December 1815 in La Fille mal gardée by Jean Dauberval, choreographed by Jean-Baptiste Brulo and with a company also including Sophie Daguin.

== Personal Life and Career ==
In 1820, he succeeded Filippo Taglioni as ballet master and dance director. After leaving Sweden, Carey danced and choreographed in Warsaw during the 1823–24 season. From December 1823 to April 1824, he staged four ballets on the stage of the National Theater in Warsaw: New Narcissus, La Fille mal gardée, Le Barbier de Séville and Return from the War. He was accompanied by his wife, Joséphine Sainte-Claire, as the first dancer of the Warsaw company. Later he also worked in Milan and Naples in 1828–29, Moscow in 1838 and finally setting up home in Amsterdam, where he was partner to Madame Montessu. His date of retirement is unknown. For a long while he corresponded with August Bournonville who was teaching Carey's sons Gustave and Édouard.

He married the French ballerina Josephine Sainte-Claire in Stockholm in 1821.

== Notes ==
Preceded by Louis Deland	Director of the Royal Swedish Ballet; 1820–1823	Succeeded by Giovanni Battista Ambrosiani
