= Hilda Lund =

Swedish ballerina (1840–1911)

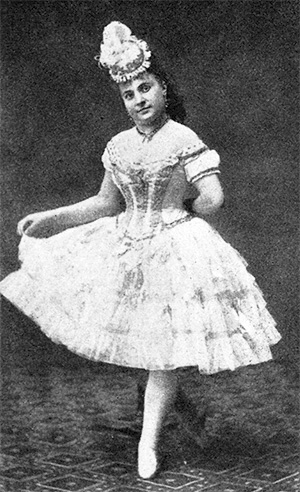
Lund in 1867

Hilda Maria Lund (née Lindh, 21 December 1840 – 7 October 1911) was a Swedish ballerina at the Royal Swedish Ballet at the Royal Swedish Opera in Stockholm.

Lund was a ballet student in 1849, a second dancer in 1861 and elevated to a premier ballerina in 1866–1888. She performed the leading parts of many of the ballets staged at the royal opera in the 1870s and 1880s and was in 1887 described as "the acknowledged most distinguished female dancer of the royal opera". She was an instructor at the ballet in 1889–1894.

She married her colleague and ballet master Sigurd Harald Lund in 1862; he died in 1906, followed by Lund herself in 1911.
