= Rådhusstræde 8 =

Building in Copenhagen

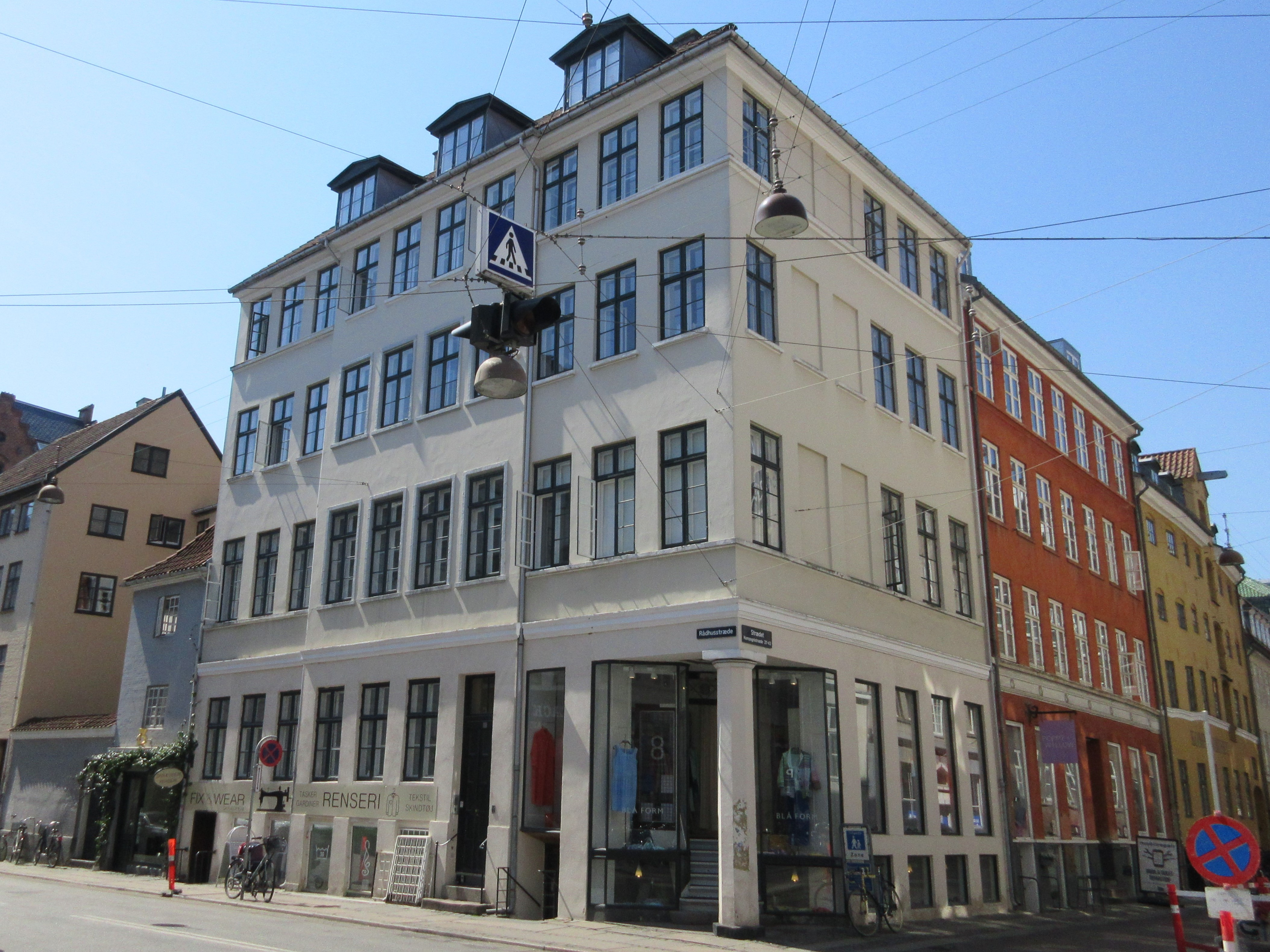
- Interactive map of the Rådhusstræde 8 area

General information
- Location: Copenhagen, Denmark
- Coordinates: 55°40′35.36″N 12°34′27.66″E
- Completed: 1784
- Renovated: 1846

Rådhusstræde 8 is an 18th-century property situated at the southern corner of Rådhusstræde and Kompagnistræde in the Old Town of Copenhagen, Denmark. It was listed in the Danish registry of protected buildings and places in 1945. Notable former residents include the historians Frederik Sneedorff (1760–1792) and Laurids Engelstoft, later Minister of Interior Affairs I.J. Unsgaard (1798–1872), writer Niels Christian Øst (1779–1842), instructor and former solo dancer at the Royal Danish Theatre Carl Dahlén and architect Martin Nyrop.

== History ==
=== 18th century ===
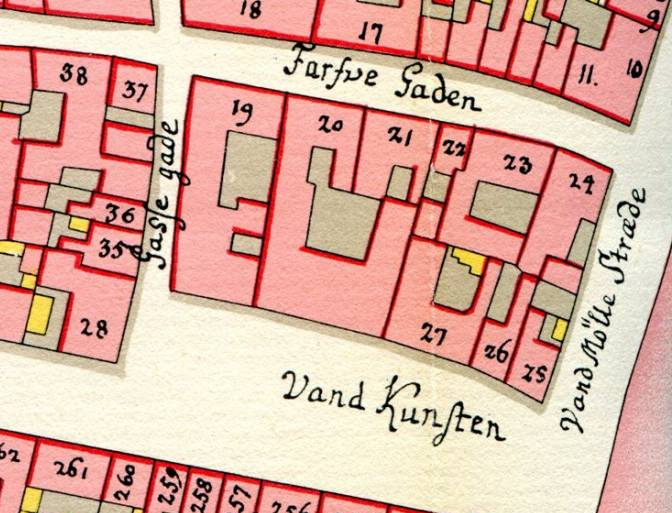
No. 24 seen in the upper right corner on a detail from Christian Gedde's map of Copenhagen's West Quarter, 1757.

The property was listed as No. 26 in the city's West Quarter (Vester Kvarter) in Copenhagen's first cadastre of 1689. It was at that time owned by Lorenz Kreier. In October 1750 most of the western side of Rådhusstræde was consumed by a devastating fire. A strip of the fire site was subsequently used for a widening of the street. What was left of the property was listed as No. 24 in the new cadastre of 1756 and was then owned by a man named Walbohm. The current building on the site was constructed in 1783–1784 by master mason Anders Nielsen Eegeroed.

At the time of the 1787 census, it was home to 15 residents in three households. Otto Franz von der Osten, an adjutant general and captain in the Danish Life Regiment, resided in the building with his wife Ingeborg Margrethe Edinger, their six-year-old son Johan Friederich von Osten, a lodger, a maid and a male servant. The servant was a musketeer in the Danish Life Regiment. Jens Lausen, a jurist, resided in the building with his wife Hinriette Leffler, a maid and a female cook. Lars Jensen, a grocer (spækhøker), resided in the building with his wife Marie Sørens Datter, their one-year-old son, a maid and a lodger.

The historian Frederik Sneedorff (1760–1792) resided in one of the apartments from 1789 until his death three years later.

The building just the Copenhagen Fire of 1795. The fire spread from the east and continued westwards along the south side of Nytorv just a few houses further to the north.

=== 19th century ===
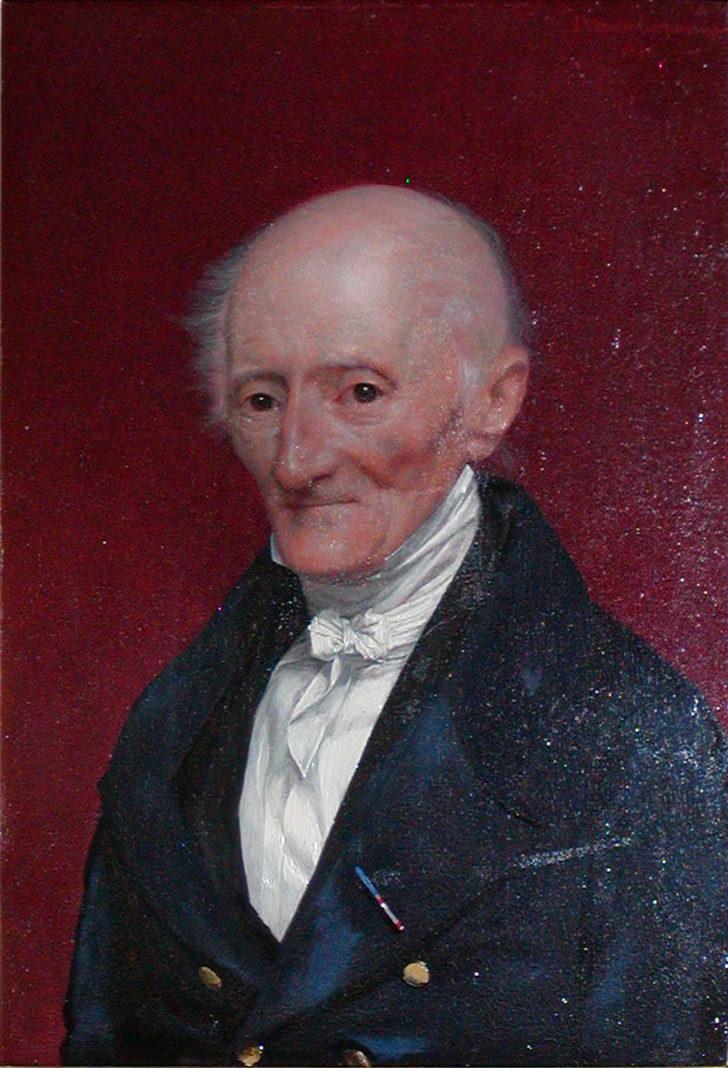
Laurids Engelstoft

The property had by the turn of the century been acquired by goldsmith Lorens Christopher Linde. At the time of the 1801 census, Linde's property was home to two large households. Linde resided in the building with his wife Anette Kramer, their four children (aged eight to 13), 14 lodgers mostly in the age range eight to 18, two maids, two goldsmiths, a master shoemaker and the master shoemakers' wife. Stine Pedersen, a widow and the mother of the shoemaker's wife, resided in the building with two shoemakers, a shoemaker's apprentice, lawyer Jens Laasbye Rottbøl (1766–1824, son of bishop Christian Michael Rottbøll), clerk Christian Lund, servant Jens Tolbøl and student Andreas Hausen.

The property was listed as No. 145 in the new cadastre of 1806. It was at that time still owned by Linde. The historian Laurids Engelstoft was among the residents of the building in 1807. I.J. Unsgaard, a civil servant and later politician, was among the residents in 1827.

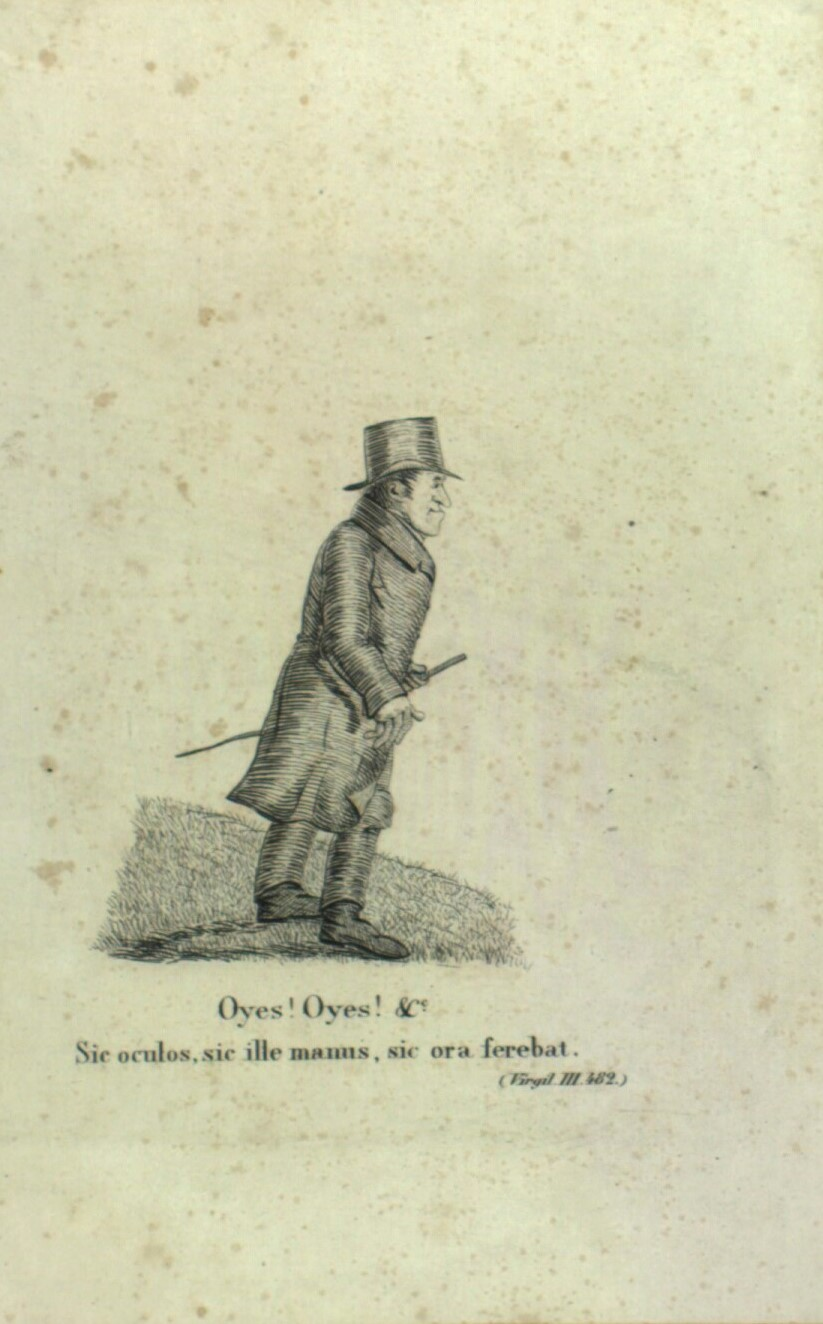
Niels Christian Øst

At the time of the 1840 census, No. 145 was home to 21 residents in four households. Georg Friderich Dørge, a county surgeon in Copenhagen (since 1802), resided on the ground floor with his wife Marie Dorthea Dørge (née Kufs), their 24-year-old daughter Louise Augusta Vilhelmine Dørge, three lodgers, two barbers (surgeons) and one maid. Niels Christian Øst (1779-1842), a magazine publisher and writer, resided on the first floor with his large book collection. Carl Dahlén, an instructor and former solo dancer at the Royal Danish Theatre, resided on the second floor with his wife Elise Dahlin (née Morthorst) and one maid. Jens Petersen Roerup, a beer seller, resided in the basement with his wife Margrethe Roerup, their two children (aged 10 and 15) and three lodgers.

At the time of the 1845 census, No. 145 was home to 33 residents in four households. The ground floor apartment was still occupied by county surgeon Johan Georg Friderik Dørge. Knuddine Andrea Andresen, a 45-year-old widow with a pension, resided on the first floor with her 27-year-old daughter Christiane Andresen, three lodgers, a maid (widow) and the maid's nine-year-old daughter. Sigismund Neve, a theologian-turned-teacher, had opened a private boarding school on the second floor. He lived there with his wife Kirstine Bay, their four-year-old son Hans Neve, six lodgers/pupils (aged 11 to 17) and two maids. The pupils were sons of wealthy families in the provinces. One of them, Christian Mazardele Garde, was the son of a kancelliråd. Two of them, Hans and Ove Muus, were sons of the owner of Sørup Manor at Ringsted. Two others, Sophus and Christian Rosted, were the sons of the owner of Belteberga in Scania. The last one, Andreas Bendixsen, was the son of merchant, tobacco manufacturer and consul in Thisted Frederich Carl Bendixen. Jens Pedersen Borup, the beer seller from the 1840 census, was still residing in the basement with his wife, their 14-year-old son and four lodgers.

The building was expanded by one floor in 1846. In 1859, when house numbering by street was introduced in Copenhagen (as a supplement to the old cadastral numbers), No. 145 was listed as Rådhusstræde 8.

At the time of the 1880 census, Rådhusstræde 8 was home to 28 residents. Annette Margrethe Cecilie Lind (née Kofod, 1803–1881), widow of a policeman in Tårnby, resided on the ground floor with three female tailors (aged 31 to 41). Christian Johan Tauber, a printmaker, resided on the first floor with his wife Caroline Laurine Amalie Tauber (née Halvorsen), their two children (aged six and 11) and one maid. Johan Vilhelm Otto, a dentist and recipient of Dannebrogordenens Hæderstegn, resided on the second floor with his wife Anna Cathrine Dorothea Otto (née Do-Meyer), their two children (aged seven and nine) and one maid. Johan Nicolai Adam Romeis, a master bookbinder and also a recipient of Dannebrogordenens Hæderstegn, resided on the third floor with his wife Ida Marie Romeis (née Haase), their 31-year-old son Just Christian Nicolai Romeis (bookbinder) and two other employees. Andrea Martine Wilmer (née Petersen), a widow, resided on the fourth floor with the lodgers Theobald Villiam Folknar Bøggild (journalist and teacher) and Anna Madsen (tailor). Hans Christian Christiansen, the proprietor of a tavern in the basement, resided in the associated dwelling with his wife Sophie Christiansen, (née Larsen) and one maid. Maas Sprehn, a retailer, resided in the other half of the basement with his wife Anna Marie Magdalene Sprehn, (née Christensen) and one maid.

The architect Martin Nyrop resided in the second floor apartment from 1886 to 1887.

== Architecture ==
The building is constructed with three storeys over a walk-out basement. The building has a 10-bay-long principal facade on Rådhusstræde with a slightly projecting four-bay median risalit and a six-bay-long facade on Kompagnistræde. The ground floor has a chamfered corner and the upper floors are supported by a column. The facade is plastered and painted in a pale yellow colour. It is finished with a white-painted belt course above the ground floor, sill courses below the lateral windows on the first floor towards Rådhusstræde and below all the windows on the first and third floor towards Kompagnistræde, and a cornice. The outched red tile roof features four dormer windows towards Rådhusstræde. The roof ridge is pierced by a chimney.

== Today ==
The building is owned by E/F Rådhusstræde 8. It contains two shops in the basement and on part of the ground floor, office space on the rest of the ground floor and one condominium on each of the upper floors.
