= Brolæggerstræde 12 =

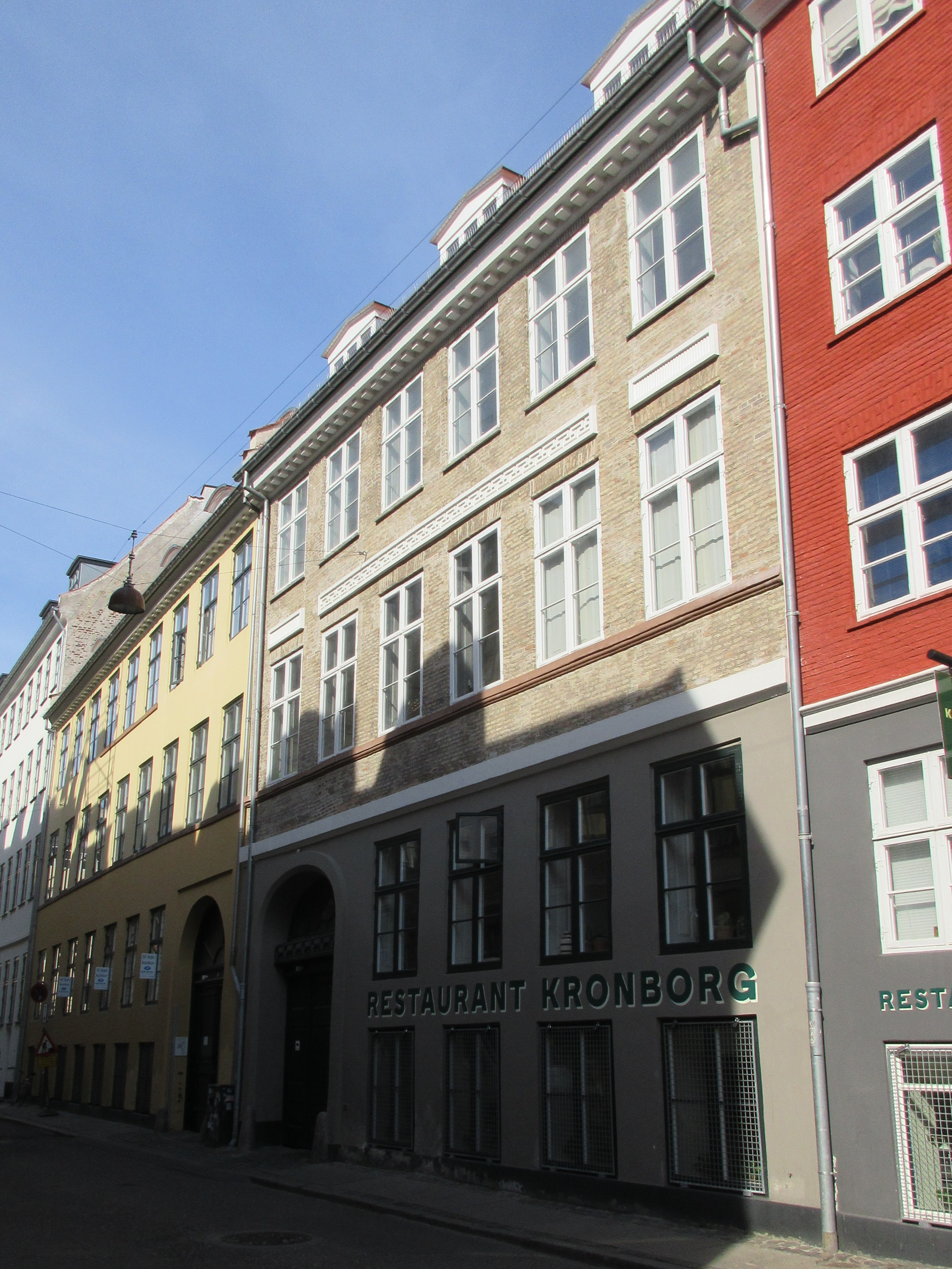
- Interactive map of the Brolæggerstræde 12 area

General information
- Architectural style: Neoclassical
- Location: Copenhagen, Denmark
- Coordinates: 55°40′39.29″N 12°34′27.91″E
- Completed: 1796

Brolæggerstræde 12 is a Neoclassical property situated in the Old Town of Copenhagen, Denmark. It was like most of the other buildings in the street constructed as part of the rebuilding of the city following the Copenhagen Fire of 1795. It was listed on the Danish registry of protected buildings and places in 1950.

== History ==
=== 18th century ===
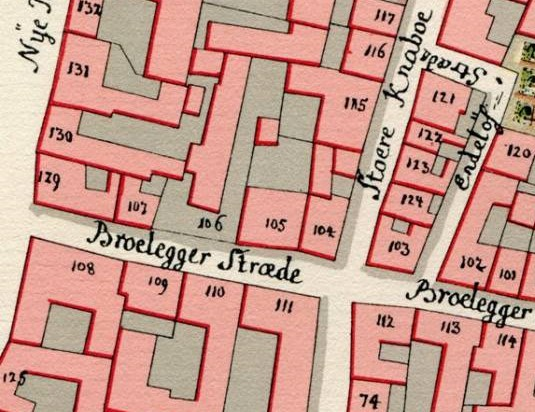
No. 105 seen on Gedde's district map of Snaren's Quarter from 1757

The property was by 1689 as No. 122 in Frimand's Quarter owned by one Peder Lerche's widow. It was by 1756 as No. 105 (new number) owned by chimney sweeper Andreas Nitsche.

At the time of the 1787 census, No. 105 was owned by court chimney sweeper Johan Samuel Starensky. He lived there with his wife Johanne Eleonora Nitsche as well as four chimney sweepers and four chimney sweeper's apprentices.

The building was together with most of the other buildings in the neighborhood completely destroyed in the Copenhagen Fire of 1795.

The current building was constructed for first dancer at the Royal Danish Ballet Carl Dahlén (1770-1851) in 1796. In 1792, he had married the Danish singer and actress Johanna Elisabeth Dahlén. In 1799 the couple left the building for a new apartment at Nytorv 11.

=== 19th century ===
At the time of the 1801 census, No. 105 was home to 17 people distributed in two households. Hans Peter Nyland, a businessman and the owner of the property, resided in the building with his wife Ane Cathrine Windfeldt, his 16-year-old grandson Thomas Nyland, a maid, two visitors from Jutland and seven lodgers. Inger Charlotte Graae, a 53-year-old widow, resided in the building with her 12-year-old niece Elisabeth Charlotte Graae, a servant and two maids.

The property was listed in the new cadastre of 1806 as No. 82. It was by then still owned by merchant H. P. Nyeland.

At the time of the 1840 census, Counter Admiral Jens Peter Stibolt resided on the first floor with his servant Hans Andersen Skoven. Albrecht Carl Adolph From von Møller (1803-1884), Captain in His Majesty's Regiment and a Regiment Quarter Master, resided with his wife and a maid on the ground floor. Therkel and Christiane Sivertsen, a retired couple, lived with two lodgers and a maid on the second floor.

=== 20th and 21st centuries ===
At the time of the 1906 census, Brolæggerstræde 12 was home to just eight people. Mathias Peter Bøgh (1850-1916), a businessman and secretary of the Nordisk Independent Order of the Good Templars, resided on the second floor with his wife Marie Bøgh. Mathias Knauer, a butcher, resided on the third floor of the rear wing with his wife Else Margrethe Mathine Knauer. Kirsten Marie Andersen, a divorced 37-year-old woman, resided on the fourth floor of the side wing with her three children (aged six to 11).

The building and the adjacent building at Knabrostræde 12 was prior to 2008 acquired by discount card operator Forbrugsforeningen af 1886.

== Architecture ==
Brolæggerstræde 12 consists of three storeys over a raised cellar and is six bays wide. The ground floor is plastered in a grey colour while the two upper storeys stand in undressed red brick. Under the windows on the first floor is a through-going sill in the full width of the building. Under the windows on the second floor is a meander frieze. The facade is finished by a dentillated corbel under the roof. The two-bay gate in the left-hand side of the building features a decorated transom and an arched transom window. It opens to a small courtyard. A perpendicular side wing extends from the rear side of the building.

== Today ==
Restaurant Kronborg, a traditional Danish smørrebrød restaurant, is based in the basement.
