= Lisa Steier =

Steier in 1913

Lisa Steier (Anna Elisabeth) (26 January 1888 – 28 August 1928) was a Swedish ballerina and ballet master.

== Biography ==
Steier was born in Stockholm, and was a student of Gunhild Rosén, Hans Beck and Michel Fokine. She became a student at the Royal Swedish Ballet at the Royal Swedish Opera in 1895; a figurant dancer in 1906, second dancer in 1908, premier dancer in 1913 (until 1924), an instructor of the ballet in 1921–1924 and ballet master in 1926–1927. She was also a dance teacher at the Royal Dramatic Training Academy for the actors at the Royal Dramatic Theatre.

Her most known parts was the main part in Sylfiderna, Arsinoe in Kleopatra, Papillon in Karneval, the solopart of Svanorna as well as various parts in the opera ballets.

In 1909 she married lieutenant Léopold Tisseau.
