= Jean-Baptiste Brulo =

Jean-Baptiste Brulo (29 January 1746 in Ghent – ?) was a French ballet dancer, choreographer and ballet master.

== Biography ==
Brulo was the son of the French dancers Jean-Baptiste Brulo and Marie-Thérèse Tabary. He danced at Bordeaux (1771–74) then at Montpellier (late 1790s), where his elder brother Mathias was ballet master and his nephew Philippe was theatre director. Brulo arrived at Stockholm in 1803 with his wife Catherine, at the same time as Filippo Taglioni. He became the Royal Swedish Ballet's premier danseur and choreographer, composing ballets for it. Together with Giovanni Battista Ambrosiani, he participated in the establishment of the theatre in Malmö. He left Sweden in January 1819 for Copenhagen, but the date and place of his death are unknown.

== Main ballets ==
- 1804 : Le Jugement de Pâris, after Pierre Gardel (Stockholm)
- 1809 : Prolog med sång och baletter (Malmö)
- 1809 : De begge Qwäkarne (Malmö)
- 1809 : La Fille mal gardée, after Jean Dauberval (Malmö)
- 1810 : Den ädelmodige sultanen (Malmö)
- 1810 : Soliman den Andre, eller De tre sultaninnorna (Malmö)
- 1812 : La Fille mal gardée (revived at Stockholm)
- 1812 : Atalante och Hypomene, eller Kappränningen (Stockholm)
- 1817 : Florentina och Adorno, eller Den förklädde sjö-röfvaren (Stockholm)
- 1818 : Aminthe och Mirtil, eller Den svartsjuke féen (Stockholm)
- 1819 : Den slet bevogtede Pige, after La Fille mal gardée by Dauberval (Copenhagen)
