= Josephine Sainte-Claire =

French ballerina

Josephine Gabrielle Marcelle Meunier Sainte-Claire (20 April 1793 – after 1823) was a French ballerina.

She was born in Paris to Joseph Marcel Meunier Sainte-Claire and Julienne Buisson.

She was premier dancer at the Imperial Ballet in Saint Peterburg in Russia in ?–1813, and a premier dancer at the Royal Swedish Ballet in Stockholm in 1813–1823. She was also a guest artist at the Royal Danish Ballet in Copenhagen in 1820–1823.

Marianne Ehrenström wrote about her: "M:lle Sainte-Claire was for a period of ten years the delight of the Stockholm audience. She was particularly talented within her pantomime ability, by her pleasing figure and the gracious modesty of her dance."

She was first married to Alexandre Vedel, actor at the French Theater in Saint Petersburg; divorced in 1813 and remarried in 1821 to her colleague in the Swedish ballet, André Isidore Carey. She left for Warsaw in 1823 and for Vienna in 1824.

== Bibliography ==
- Fredrik August Dahlgren: Förteckning öfver svenska skådespel uppförda på Stockholms theatrar 1737–1863 och Kongl. Theatrarnes personal 1773–1863. Med flera anteckningar
- Nils Personne: Svenska teatern. Några anteckningar. Svenska teatern under Karl Johanstiden 1810–1818
- Joséphine G M M Carey (f. Sainte-Claire), urn:sbl:16369, Svenskt biografiskt lexikon (art av N. Personne.), hämtad 2016-12-22.
