= Knabrostræde 14 =

Building in Copenhagen, Denmark

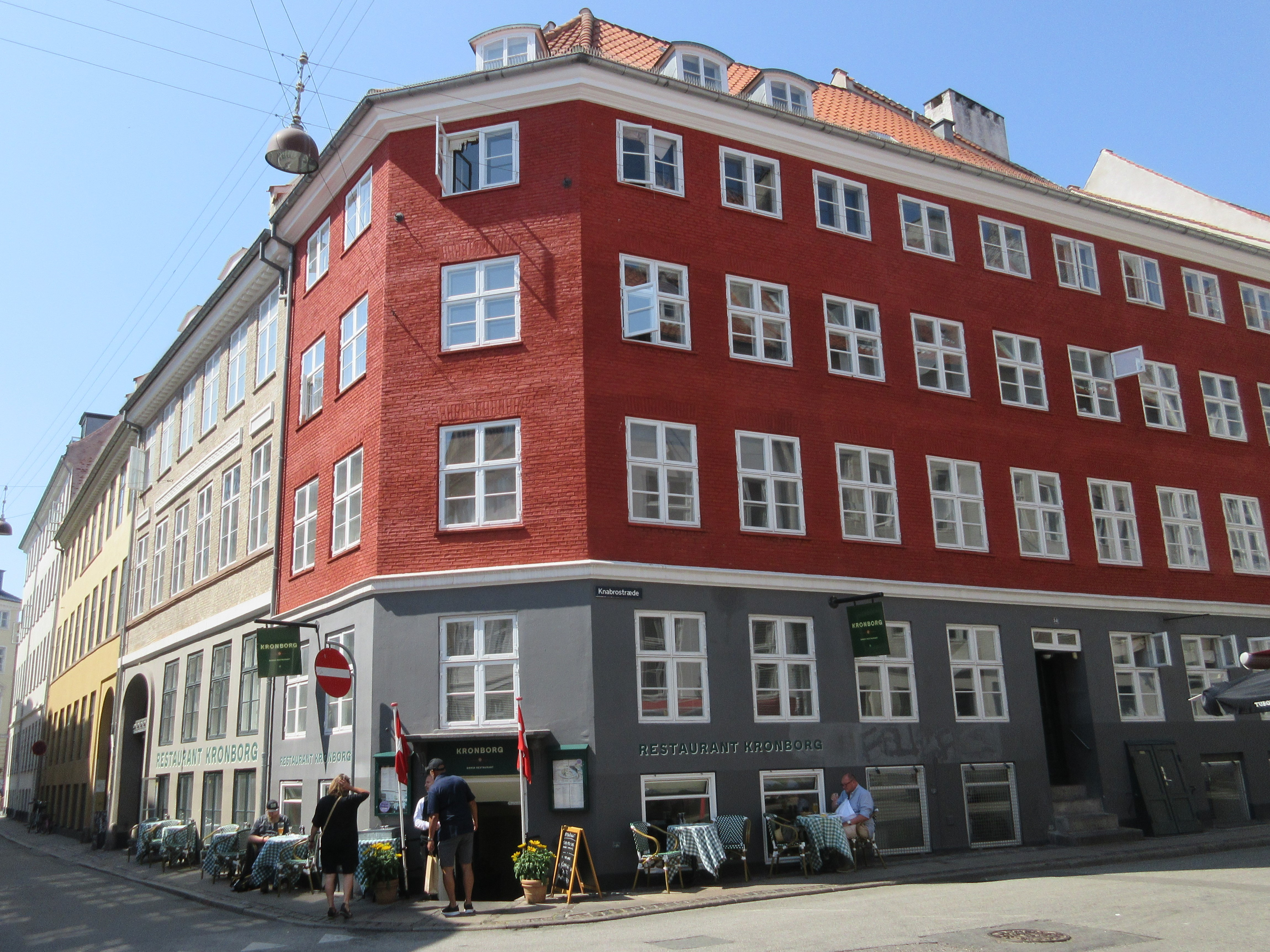
- Interactive map of the Knabrostræde 14 area

General information
- Architectural style: Neoclassical
- Location: Copenhagen, Denmark
- Coordinates: 55°40′39.79″N 12°34′28.09″E
- Completed: 1801

Knabrostræde 14 is a Neoclassical property located at the corner of Knabrostræde and Brolæggerstræde in the Old Town of Copenhagen, Denmark. It was listed on the Danish registry of protected buildings and places in 1950.

== History ==
The site was in 1689 made up of two properties owned by havnefoged (harbormaster) Christen Jespersen (No. 120) and tailor Anders Poulsen (No. 121). The two properties had by 1756 been merged into a single property as No. 104 and were by then owned by procurator Christian Mathias Holm. The buildings were together with most of the other buildings in the neighborhood completely destroyed in the Copenhagen Fire of 1795.

The current building was constructed in 1799-1801 by master mason Hans Eric Meyer. The building was at the census the same year home to a total of 46 people. The property was in the new cadastre of 1801 listed as No. 81 and was by then still owned by Meyer.

The later politician Carl Christoffer Georg Andræ resided in the building from 1830. He was a captain in the Road Corps.

At the time of the 1860 census, the number of residents had increased to 52 people. The residents included a tavern owner, a master tailor, a master wood carver, a master joiner, a master house painter and a master shoemaker.

== Architecture ==
The building is constructed in brick with four storeys over a walk-out basement. The building is rendered in a pale grey colour on the ground floor and is red on the three upper floors. The facade towards Knabrostræde is 10 bays long while the one towards Brilæggerstræde is just two bays long. The chamfered corner bay was dictated for all corner buildings by Jørgen Henrich Rawert's and Peter Meyn's guidelines for the rebuilding of the city after the fire so that the fire department's long ladder companies could navigate the streets more easily. The building was originally constructed with an entrance door in both streets but the one in Brolæggerstræde has been removed.

== Today ==
The building is together with the two adjacent buildings at Knabrostræde 12 and Brolæggerstræde 12. Restaurant Kronborg, a traditional Danish smørrebrød restaurant, is based in the basement.
