= Sankt Annæ Plads 1–3 =

Building in Copenhagen, Denmark

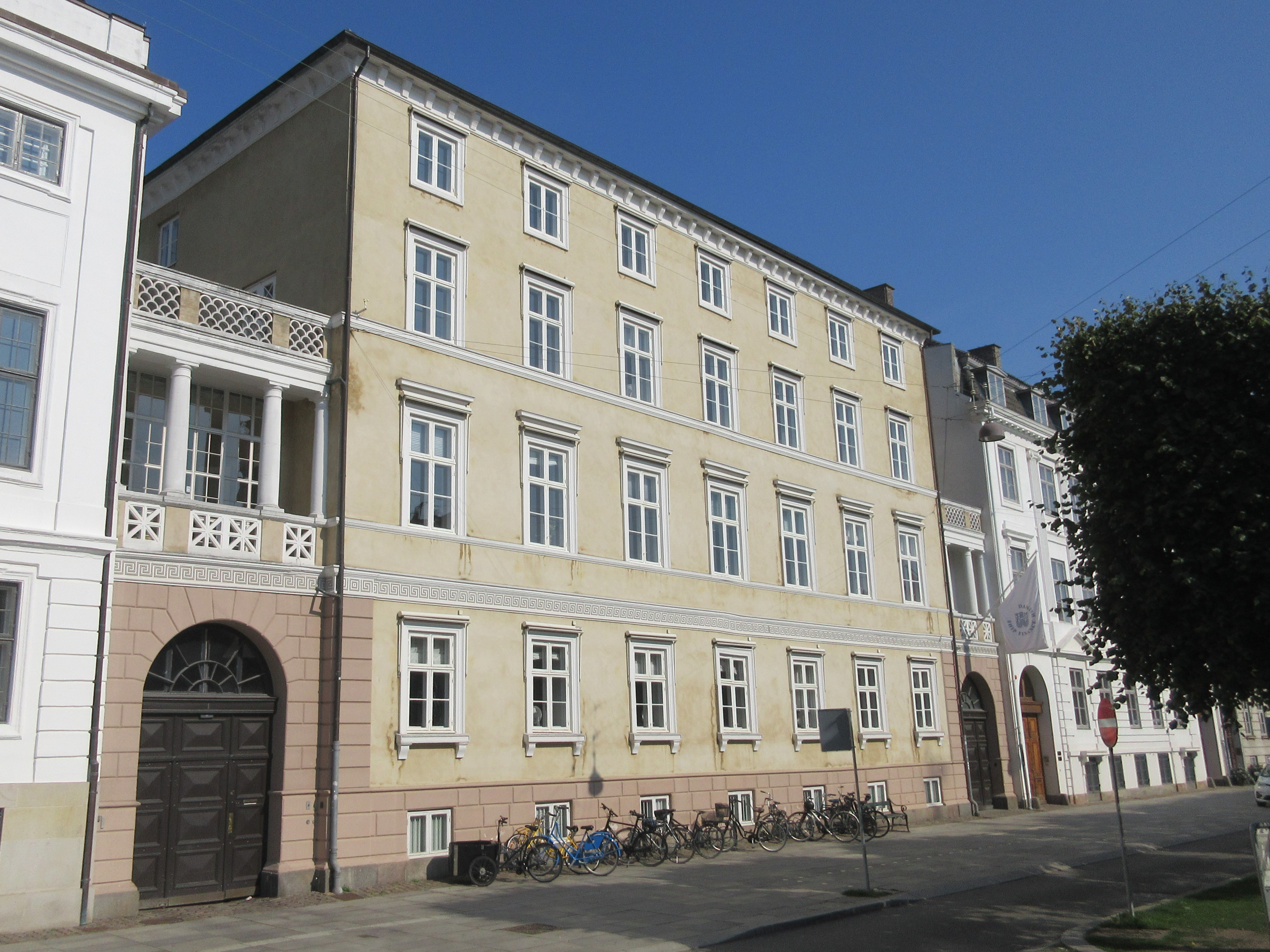
- Interactive map of the Sankt Annæ Plads 1–3 area

General information
- Architectural style: Historicism
- Location: Copenhagen, Denmark
- Coordinates: 55°40′56.4″N 12°35′22.04″E
- Completed: 1847
- Inaugurated: 1849

Design and construction
- Architect: Gustav Friedrich Hetsch

The Sankt Annæ Plads 1–3, also known as the Fibiger House (Danish: Fibigers Gård), is a Late Neoclassical property at Sankt Annæ Plads in Copenhagen, Denmark. Built in 1849, it originally contained high-end apartments for well-to-do members of the bourgeoisie but was converted into office space in the second half of the 20th century. It was listed by the Danish Heritage Agency in the Danish national registry of protected buildings in 1932. Danmarks Skibskredit A/S is now based in the building.

== History ==
The site where building stands today was formerly part of the gardens of the neighboring Lindencrone Mansion. Adolph Christian Fibiger, a canvas manufacturer, acquired the mansion in 1840. He later commissioned Gustav Friedrich Hetsch to design the building at Sankt Annæ Plads 1–3 with high-end apartments for well-to-do members of the bourgeoisie. Hetsch made the initial renderings in 1847 but was removed from the project after a dispute with Fibiger and the building was instead completed by Peter Christoph Hagemann to a slightly modified design in 1849. The building contained two apartments in the ground floor and a single apartment on the others floors.

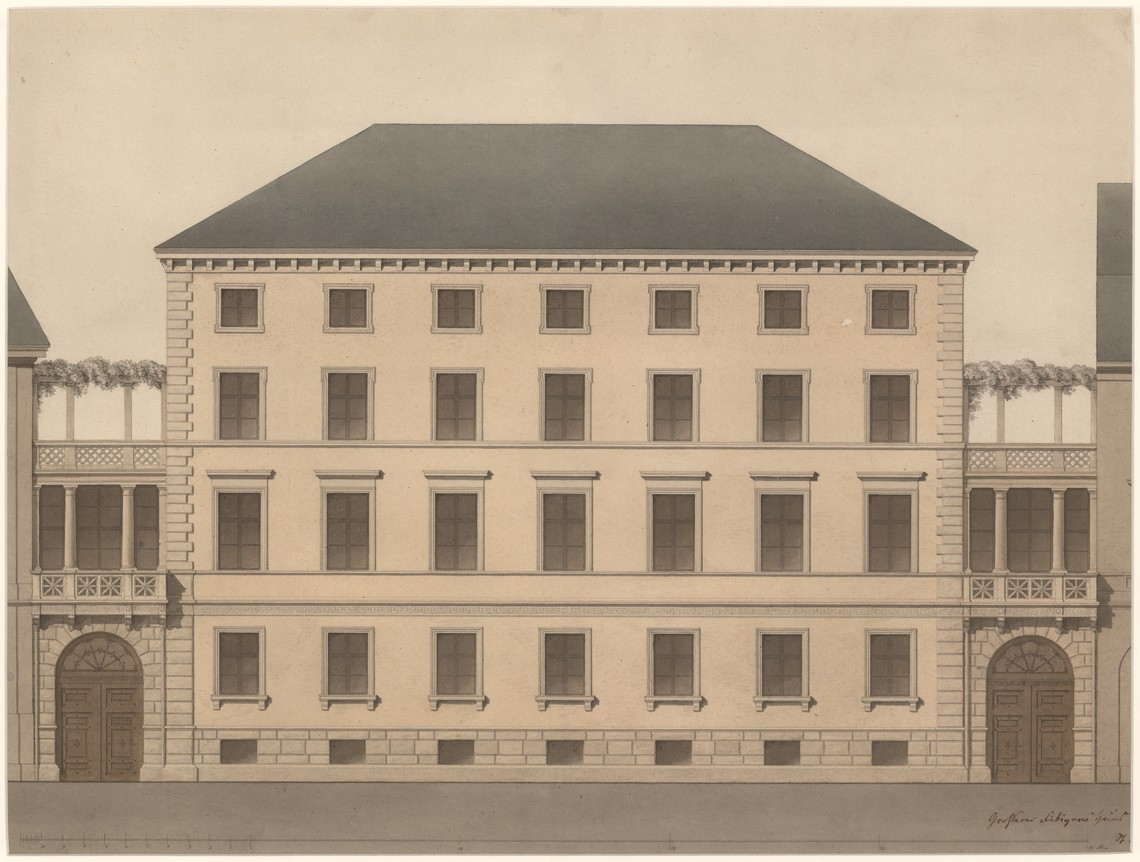
Elevation by Hetsch from 1847

The civil servant George Joachim Quaade, who had previously had a residence at Amalienborg, lived briefly in one of the apartments in 1853 but moved to new home in a now demolished building at Bredgade 19 in 1854. In 1856 he became Department executive (departementschef) of the in the Ministry of Foreign Affairs. From 1860, he served as ambassador in first The Haque and later Brussels and Berlin. The jurist and politician Gustav Edvard Brock lived in the building from 1863. Royal Ballet Master August Bournonville lived at No. 3 in the mid-1870s.

The building was altered in 1881. It was listed in 1932. The building was listed in 1932. It was adapted for use as offices in the post war period but restored in 1988. The facade was restored by Erik Jørgensens Tegnestue with assistance from Bo Kierkegaard in 1996.

== Architecture ==
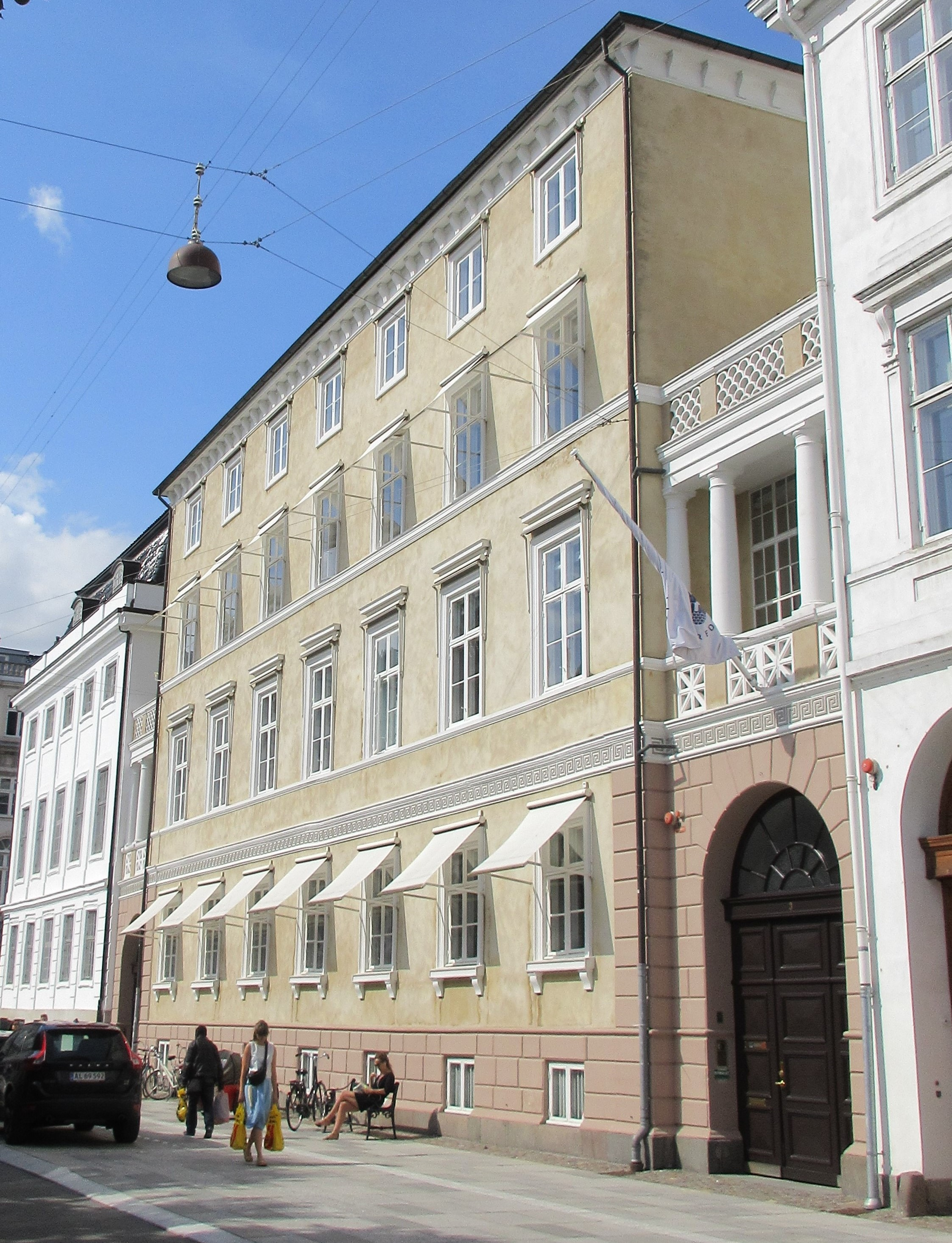
The building seen from the street.

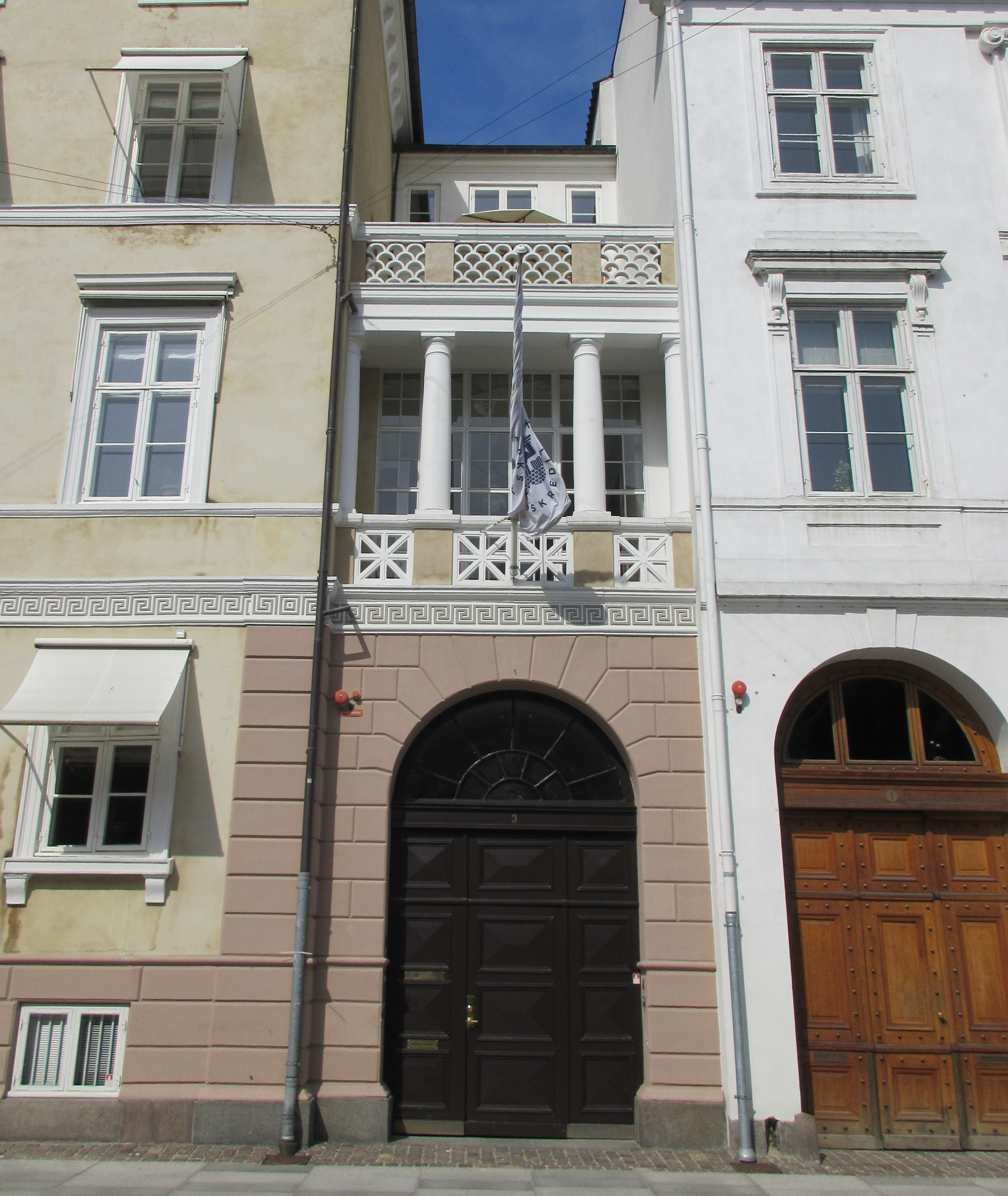
One of the pavilions

Designed in the Historicist style, the building consists of four storeys over a high cellar and is seven bays wide. It stands on a plinth of granite and is topped by a Half-hip slate roof. The building is flanked by two lower pavilions, each of which has a gateway in the ground floor, a loggia with columns on the first floor and a roof terrace with decorated parapet. A third floor with balcony which had been added in 1881 was removed in the 1988 restoration. The facade of the building is dressed in a pale sand colour. A continuous meander frieze runs between the first and second storey of the buildings and the two pavilions and a blank, white frieze runs between the second and third floor. The nornice and window sills are supported by corbels.

The book Danske Arkitekturstrømninger 1850-1950 contains plan drawings and facade renderings of the building.

== Today ==
Danmarks Skibskredit A/S is now based in the building.
