= Nadja Sellrup =

Swedish ballet dancer (born 1977)

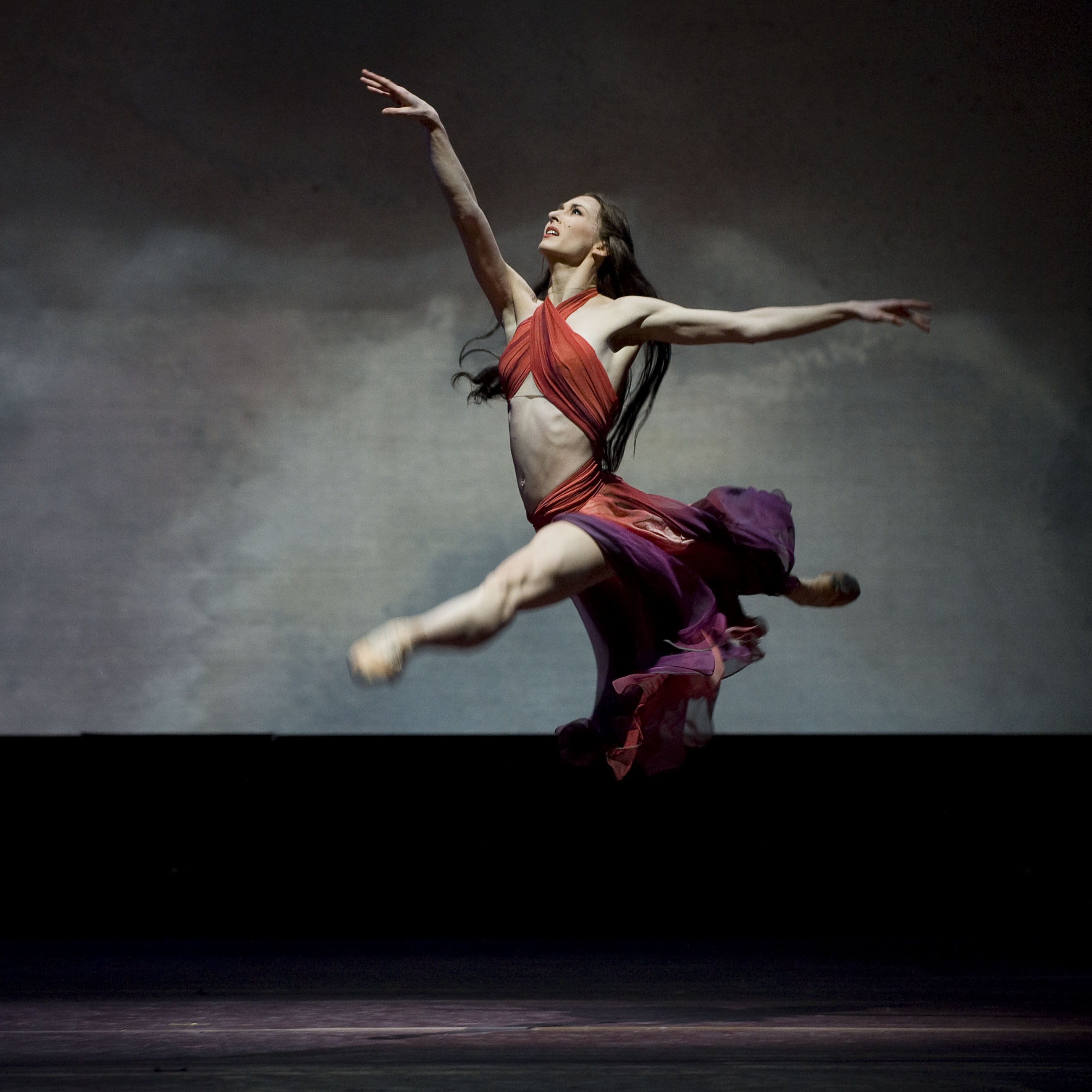
Nadja Sellrup as Esmeralda in The Bellringer of Notre-Dame (2009)

Nadja Sellrup (born 1977) is a Swedish ballet dancer. After terms with the Bavarian State Ballet in Munich and the Spanish National Dance Company in Madrid, she returned to Stockholm in 2007 to join the Royal Swedish Ballet where she is a principal dancer.

== Biography ==
Sellrup attended the Royal Swedish Ballet School, graduating in 1994. In 1995, she won the silver medal at the Eurovision Young Dancers Contest. After joining the Royal Swedish Ballet, she spent a short period with the Bavarian State Ballet (1995–96) as a soloist. In 2001, she joined the Spanish National Dance Company but returned to Sweden in 2007, soon becoming a principal dancer.

She has danced the leading roles in Swan Lake, Giselle, Romeo and Juliet and Aurora in The Sleeping Beauty as well as Esmeralda in Pär Isberg's The Bellringer of Notre Dame and Hermia in John Neumeier's A Midsummer Night's Dream.
