= Gustav Edvard Brock =

Danish lawyer and politician

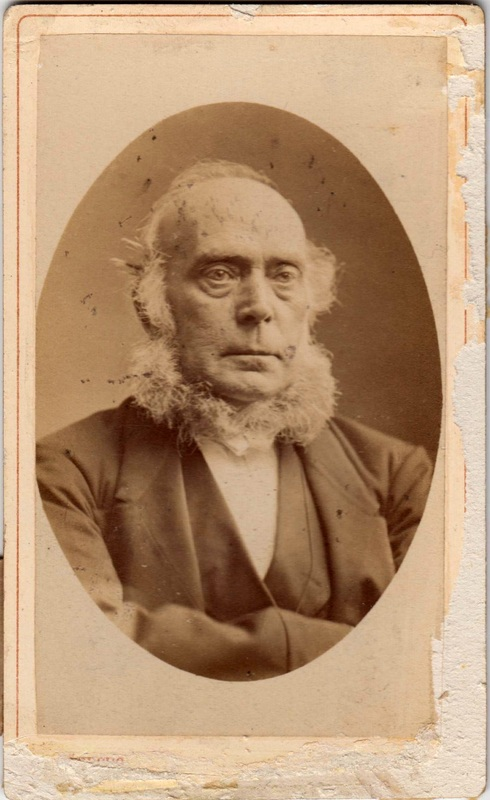
Gustav Edward Brock

Gustav Edvard Brock (6 February 1816 – 29 December 1878) was a Danish lawyer and politician. He was alongside Carl Christian Vilhelm Liebe regarded as one of the leading Danish lawyers of his time.

== Early life and education ==
Brock was born on 6 February 1816 in Copenhagen, the son of merchant Frederik Christian Brock (c. 1770–1824) and Anna Cecilie Pihl (1782–1871). He graduated from the Von Westenske Institut in 1832. He then went on to study law at the University of Copenhagen, graduating in 1837.

== Legal career ==
Brock passed his Overret exams in 1847 and qualified as a Supreme Court lawyer in 1849. He was alongside Carl Christian Vilhelm Liebe regarded as one of the leading lawyers of his time. One of his most prominent cases was as prosecutor in the 1855 case at the Court of Impeachment (Danish: Rigsretten) against members of the Cabinet of Ørsted. In the 1866 trial against C. St. A. Bille, editor of Dagbladet, in which he was accused of lèse-majesté, Brock served as his defense lawyer.

Brock was a member of a number of legislative commissions, including the law procedure commissions of 1857 and 1868, and the Penal Code Commission of 1859.

He was a board member of the Nordic Jurist Meetings and a co-host of the 1872 Nordic Jurist Meeting in Copenhagen.

== Politics ==
Brock was in 1860 elected for the Landstinget in Copenhagen. In 1870–78, he was a member of Rigsretten. On a study trip to Paris, he showed particular interest in French criminal procedure and rhetorics. He only played a minor role as a politician. Leaning towards the National Liberal party, he was in opposition to J. B. S. Estrup, but on the other hand, also opposed to a parliamentarism based on the absolute primacy of Folketinget. He took part in the negotiations for a new penal code and the revision of Fæsteloven.

== Personal life ==
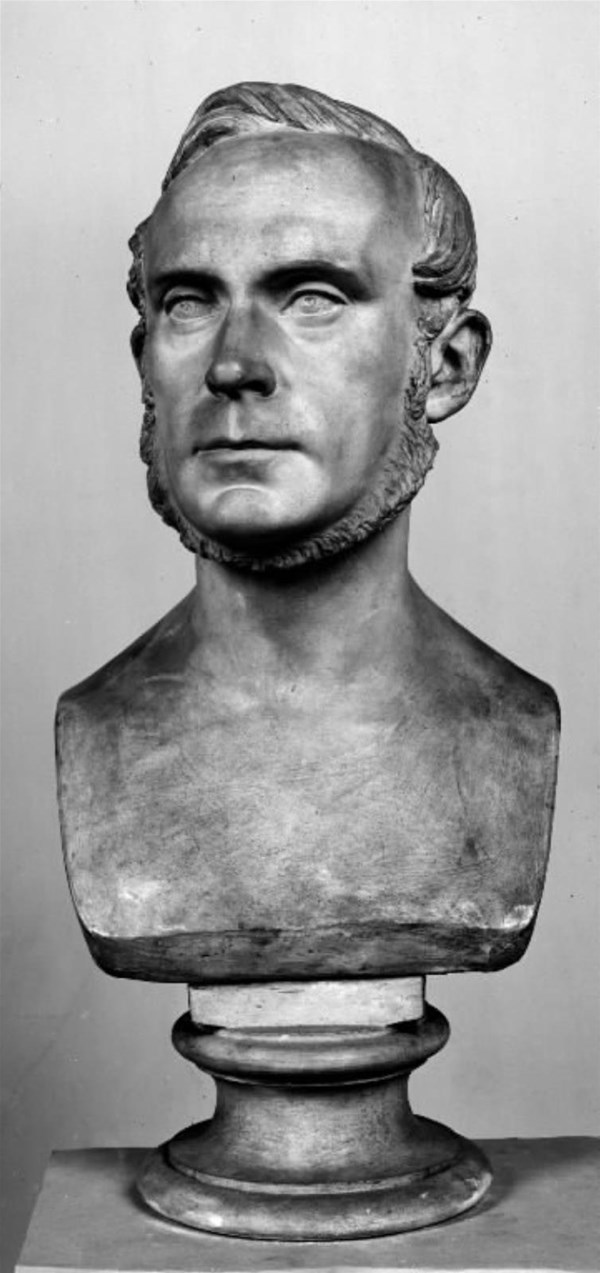
Bust of Brock by H. W. Bissen, 1853

Brock married Amalie Bjerring (20 June 1821 – 23 February 1872), a daughter of lawyer Niels Christian Bjerring (1773–1840) and Pauline A. N. Kjeldskov (1783–1872), on 23 September 1848 in the Church of Our Lady in Copenhagen.

The couple lived at Badstuestræde 18 from 1849 to 1856. They then lived ain a now demolished building at Frederiksborggade 1 and finally in an apartment at Sankt Annæ Plads 1-3 from 1863.

In 1858, Herman Wilhelm Bissen created a pair of portrait busts of Brock and his wife. The painter Vilhelm Marstrand painted a portrait painting of Brock in 1868. He died on 29 December 1878 and is buried in the Cemetery of Holmen.

== Honours ==
Brock was created a Knight in the Order of the Dannebrog in 1857 and was awarded the Medal of Honour in 1874.
