= Sophie Cysch =

Swedish mezzo-soprano singer and stage actress

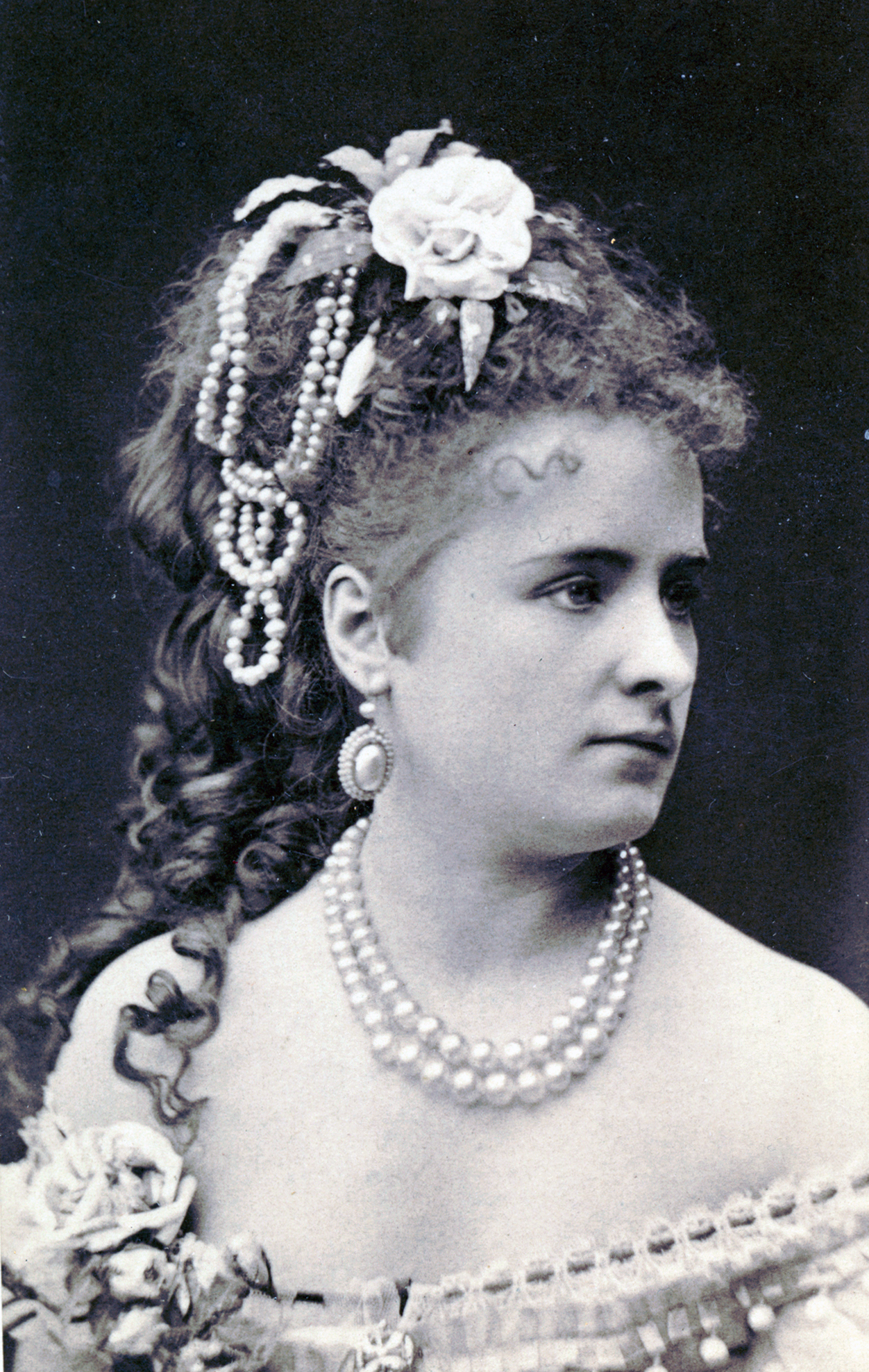
Sophie Cysch (1897)

Hedvig Carolina Sophie Cysch née Wiberg (1847–1917) was a Swedish mezzo-soprano singer and stage actress, frequently performing the leading roles in operettas, both in Stockholm and Gothenburg. In particular, she is remembered for performing the title role in Sköna Helena, the Swedish version of Offenbach's La belle Hélène.

== Biography ==
Born in Stockholm on 15 October 1847, Sophie Wiberg was the daughter of the caretaker Karl Erik Wiberg and Anna Elisabet Sederström. She attended Anders Selinder's ballet school from 1857 and the Royal Theatre's school from 1863. She made her début at the Nya Teatern in Gothenburg in the spring of 1866 as Laura in Bjørnstjerne Bjørnson's De Nygifte (The Newly Weds) and from 1867 performed in the recently established Svenska Teatern in Stockholm where from the start she was acclaimed as one of the most talented actresses. She was engaged by the Royal Theatre from 1872 to 1877. After studying in Paris (1877–79), she performed in various theatres in Gothenburg and Stockholm from 1880 to 1888. In 1882, she married the wholesaler Karl Teador Cysch (1853–1903).

On the stage, she quickly gained popularity, performing as Madame Tallien in François Ponsard's Det besegrade lejonet (Le Lion amoureux) and Rose in his Hedern och penningen (L'Honneur et l'Argent). She also played Hero in Shakespeare's Mycket väsen för ingenting (Much Ado About Nothing), Juliet in Romeo and Juliet and Cordelia in King Lear. She was also an increasingly prominent operetta singer, especially thanks to her interpretation of the title role in Offenbach's La belle Hélène.

Following her marriage, Cysch retired from full-time engagements but supported the theatrical production company she established with her husband. In August 1882, she performed the title role in Hervé's Lili at the Djurgårdsteatern in Stockholm, bringing their enterprise considerable success. The show continued throughout the autumn and in the winter at Södra Teatern. She later performed in Suppé's Die schöne Galathée and in Charles Lecocq's Giroflé-Girofla. Thanks to her successes, she became known as "the Swedish Judic" after the French operetta singer Anna Judic.

After appearing on the stage for the last time in 1888, once again in La belle Hélène, her final years became increasingly difficult. After losing all his assets, her husband died in 1903, leaving her without means. After a period in a widow's charity home, she died in the mental illness department of the Stockholm health authority on 20 March 1917.
