= Sigurd Harald Lund =

Swedish ballet dancer (1823–1906)

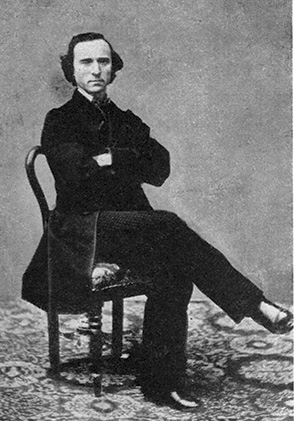
Sigurd Harald Lund

Sigurd Harald Lund (1823–1906) was a Swedish ballet dancer, choreographer and director. He was ballet master of the Royal Swedish Ballet in 1856–1862 and 1890–1894.

Sigurd Harald Lund was the son of the Danish actor Kristian Lund and Katharine Kristine Heckel. He married first to Hansine Leonardine Hansen, and later to the ballerina Hilda Lund. He was a student of August Bournonville. He became a student at the Royal Swedish Ballet in 1832, a second dancer in 1846, premier dancer in 1849, and First Premier Dancer in 1853. He also made choreographs for ballets.

Preceded by Anders Selinder	Director of the Royal Swedish Ballet; 1856–1862	Succeeded by Théodore Martin
Preceded by Robert Sjöblom	Director of the Royal Swedish Ballet; 1890–1894	Succeeded by Max Glasemann
