= Carl Dahlén =

Swedish ballet dancer and choreographer

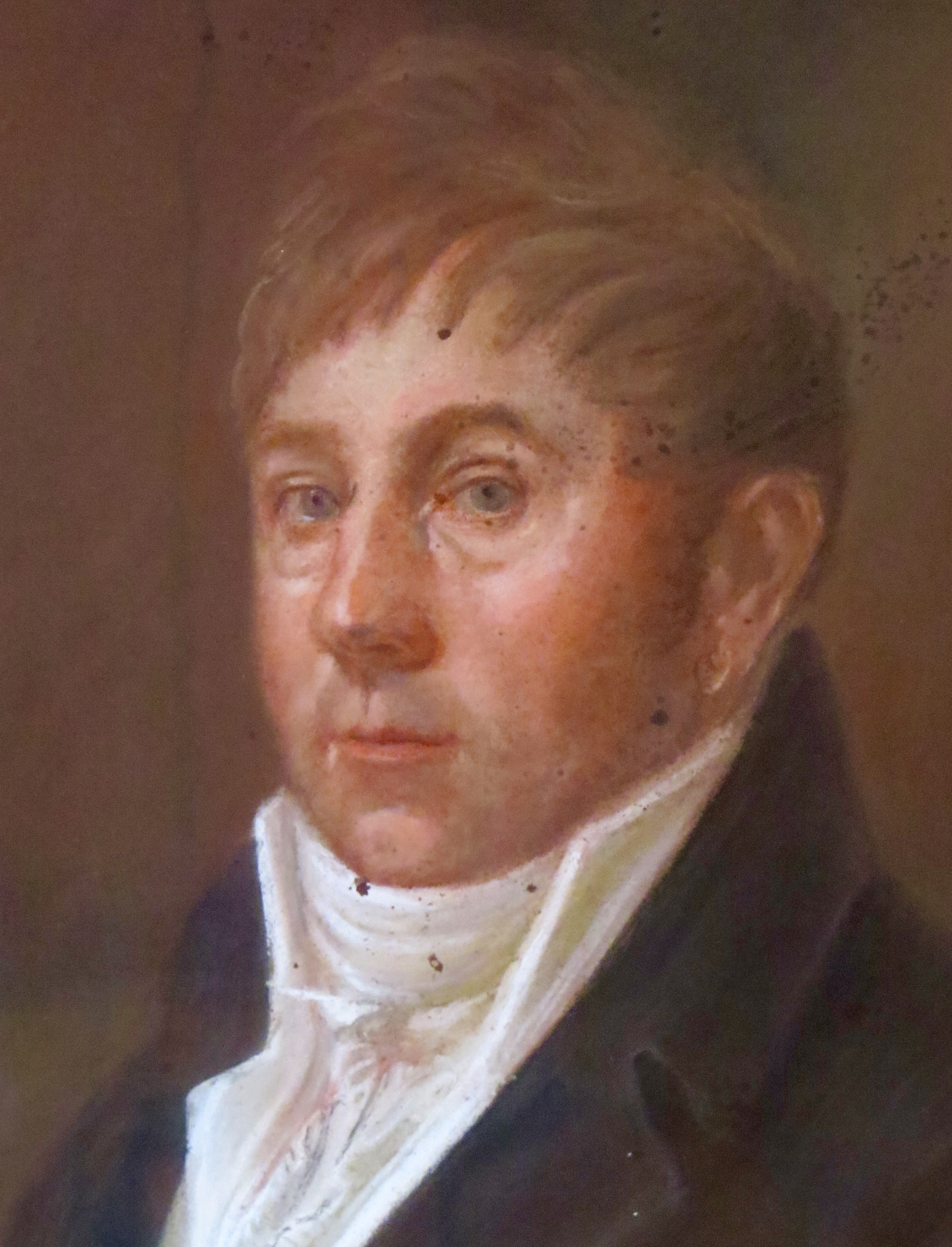
- Portrait by unknown artist
- Born: 1770; Stockholm, Sweden
- Died: 1 December 1851 (aged 80–81); Copenhagen, Denmark
- Occupations: dancer, ballet master

Carl Dahlén (1770 – 1 December 1851) was a Swedish ballet dancer and choreographer, active first at the Royal Swedish Ballet at the Royal Swedish Opera in Stockholm, and second at the Royal Danish Ballet in Copenhagen at the Royal Danish Theatre in Denmark. He belonged to the first male Swedish stars at the Royal Swedish ballet.

== Career ==
He was made a figurante in the ballet 1785, a coryfee in 1789 and premier dancer in 1791. He participated in the pantomime ballet Det dubbla giftermålet by Jean-Rémy Marcadet opposite Margaretha Christina Hallongren, Hedda Hjortsberg, Joseph Saint-Fauraux Raimond and Carlo Caspare Simone Uttini the 1790–91 season. He was admired for his beauty and grace and attracted the attention of King Gustav III of Sweden.

The circumstances of his departure from the Swedish ballet are well known. A nobleman from the royal court was sent to him with the message from the king that he had been given a higher allowance; upon delivering the message, the courtier "allowed himself" a certain remark in connection to this, which insulted Dahlen, who gave him a slap to the face. Dahlen then quickly left the capital in fear of the nobleman's revenge.

He was active at the ballet in Copenhagen for the rest of his career. He also composed his own ballet, Armida, which was performed in 1821–22. He retired in 1823.

== Personal life ==
He was married to the Danish singer Johanna Elisabeth Morthorst.

Dahlén accepted a young Hans Christian Andersen as a ballet student in spite of his lack of talent. Andersen was also a frequent guest in Dahlén's home, then at Badstuestræde 18: He describes the relationship in The Fairy Tale of My Life:

The dancer, Dahlén, whose wife at that time was one of the first artists of the Danish boards, opened his house to me. I passed many an evening there, and the gentle, warm-hearted lady was kind to me. The husband took me with him to the dancing-school, and that was to me one stop neaerer to the theatre. There stoof I for whole mornings, with a long stoff, and stretched my legs; but notwithstanding my good-will, it was Dahlén's opinion that I should never get beyong a figurente.
