= Gunhild Rosén =

Swedish ballet dancer, choreographer

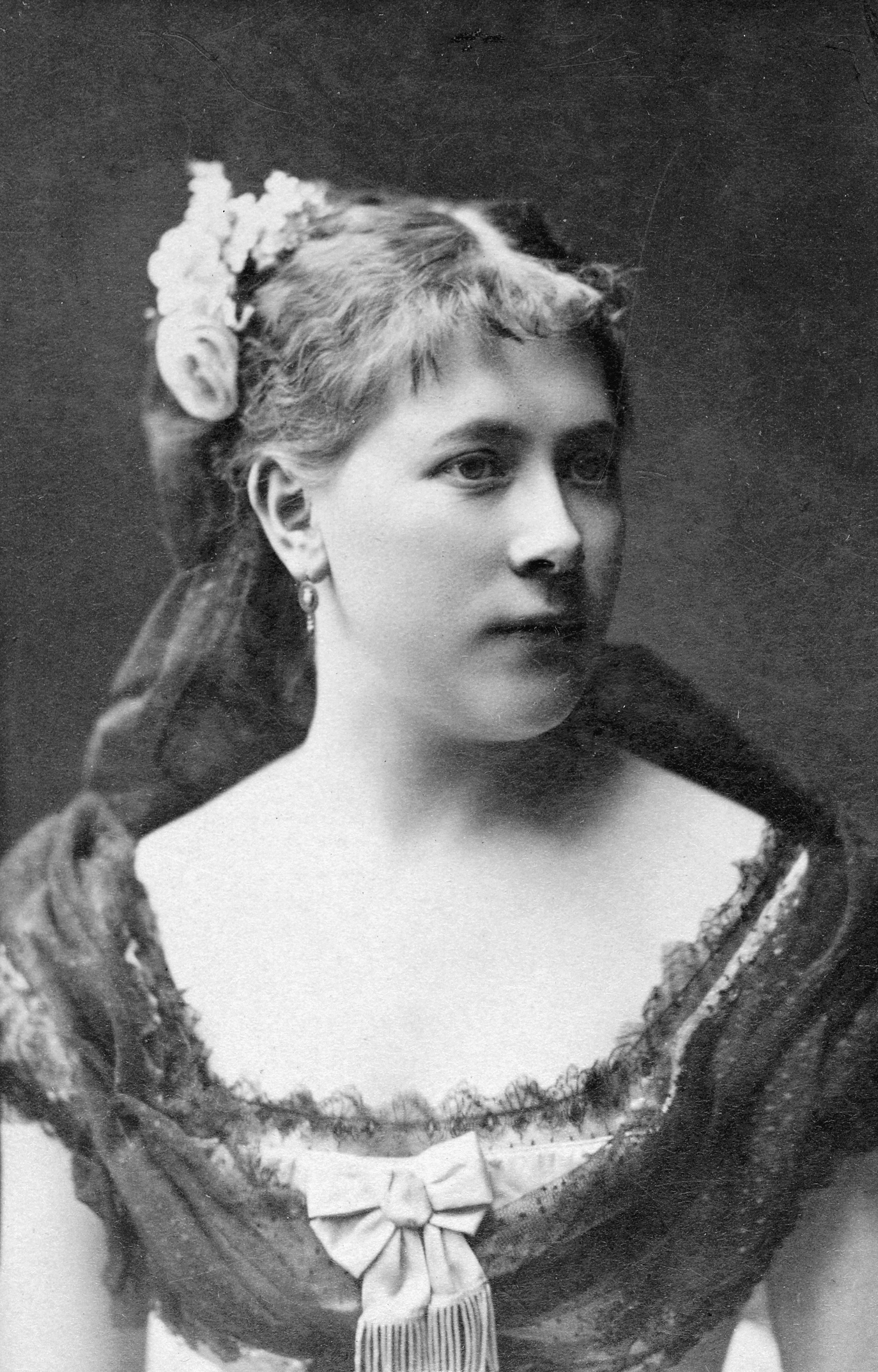
Gunhild Rosén

Gunhild Rosén (7 December 1855 - 1928) was a Swedish ballerina, choreographer and a ballet master of the Royal Swedish Ballet in Stockholm.

Gunhild Rosén was born in Norrköping, and was a student of Anders Selinder. She became a figurant dancer at the Ballet of the Royal Swedish Opera in 1872, second dancer in 1875 and premier dancer in 1881; she was a vice ballet master in 1894, and ballet master from 1922 to 1926.

She composed the ballet "I Ungern" ("In Hungary") and the balett part for the opera "Brudköpet" ("Bride purchase"). She performed in Copenhagen in 1878, 1879 and 1890 and in Oslo in 1880, 1881 and 1890. Her most famous parts was Valse brillante and Svanilda in "Coppelia" as well as parts in "Aufforderung z. Tanz", "Skugg-balett" and "Blomsterfesten i Genzano".
