= Giovanni Battista Ambrosiani =

Italian dancer (1772–1832)

Giovanni Battista Ambrosiani (born 2 July 1772, Milan – 19 February 1832, Karlberg Palace) was an Italian ballet dancer. He arrived in Stockholm in 1795 and was taken on by the Royal Swedish Ballet as its premier danseur, then as its ballet master from 1823 to 1827. He was also dance master and gymnastics master at the Military Academy Karlberg until 1834. He notably created ballets for operas like Il turco in Italia by Rossini, Preciosa by Weber and Fernand Cortez by Spontini.

== Succession ==
Preceded by André Isidore Carey	Director of the Royal Swedish Ballet; 1823–1827	Succeeded by Sophie Daguin
