= Per Erik Wallqvist =

Swedish ballet master (1797–1855)

Per Erik Wallqvist (7 September 1797 in Stockholm – 16 February 1855) was a Swedish ballet dancer and ballet master. Wallqvist was the ballet master of the Royal Swedish Ballet at the Royal Swedish Opera in Stockholm between 1827 and 1833.

Preceded by Sophie Daguin	Director of the Royal Swedish Ballet; 1827–1833	Succeeded by Anders Selinder
