= Charlotte Norberg =

Swedish Ballerina and ballet teacher

Maria Charlotta "Charlotte" Norberg also known as Charlotte Törner (27 December 1824 in Stockholm – 25 February 1892 in Stockholm) was a Swedish ballerina and ballet teacher. She was a star of the Royal Swedish Ballet in the mid-19th century.

== Life ==
Charlotte Norberg was born in Stockholm.

In 1833, she was enrolled in the Royal Swedish Ballet at the Royal Swedish Opera as the student of Sophie Daguin at the age of nine. She made her debut as a solo dancer in 1834. In 1842, she made a success in the pantomime ballet Max och Emma by Sophie Daguin with music by A. F. Schwartz, and in La fille mal gardée by Jean Dauberval.

In 1846–47, she made a study trip to take lessons by August Bournonville in the Royal Danish Ballet in Copenhagen. Upon her return to Stockholm in 1847, she was appointed premier dancer (ballerina), a position she kept for the duration of her career. During the mid 19th-century, Charlotte Norberg belonged to the stars of the Royal Swedish Ballet and "during the late 1840s and the entire 1850s, she was very celebrated within the art of dance among the Stockholm audience." She was regarded as a prominent representative of the Bournonville School and, alongside Johanna Sundberg, was often requested by August Bournonville during his guest performances in Stockholm. Charlotte Norberg also gave lessons and instructed her own students in the Bournonville technique.

Norberg retired from the stage following a performance of August Bournonville's Pesten i Albano on 30 November 1859. As a principal dancer (Premier Dancer) in Stockholm, she performed leading choreographic roles and later instructed pupils in the techniques of the Bournonville school, where she had trained

In 1853, she married Gustaf Fredrik Törner (1821-1898), a clerk at the Royal Opera.
