= Johanna Elisabeth Dahlén =

Danish stage actress and opera singer

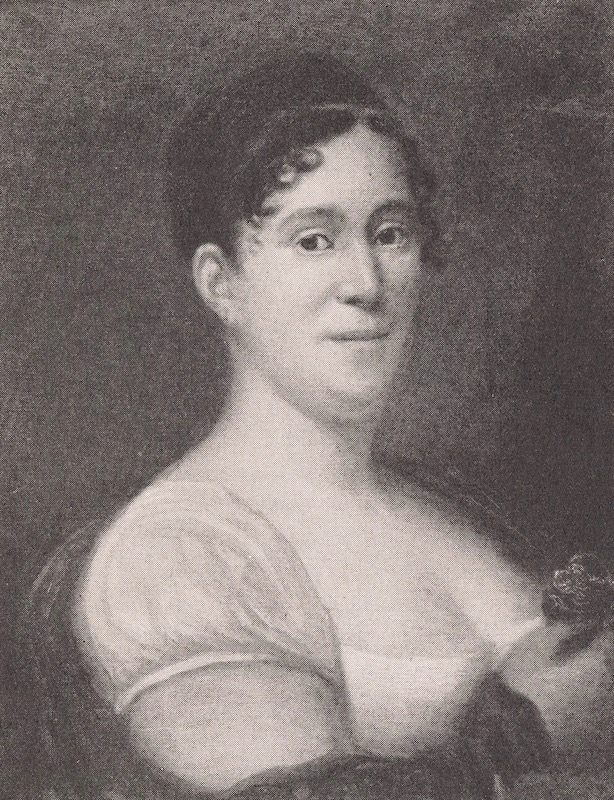
- Born: 1757
- Died: 1845 (aged 87-88)
- Occupation: Stage actress
- Years active: 1782–1827
- Organization: Royal Danish Theatre
- Spouse: Carl Dahlén (m. 1792)

Johanna Elisabeth Dahlén née Morthorst (1757–1845) was a Danish stage actress and opera singer. She belonged to the elite members of the Royal Danish Theatre between 1784 and 1827.

She made her debut as an actress on 21 September 1784. While active as an actress her entire career, it was in the capacity of an opera singer she was truly successful. She was described as a musically gifted coloratura soprano. She successfully performed the role of ingenue until she gradually shifted to mother roles.

On 4 May 1827, she appeared in her final role as Baronesse Düthelm in Det sidste middel.

== List of roles ==
=== 1780s ===
- 1782 Den stundesløse as Ane, kokkepige
- 1783 Den politiske kandestøber as Pige
- 1783 Faderen as Sypige
- 1783 Julie as Jomfru
- 1784 Balders død as Valkyrie
- 1784 Barselstuen as Barselskonens pige
- 1784 Cecilia as Anna
- 1784 De samnitiske ægteskaber as Samnitisk pige
- 1784 De uventede tilfælde as Emilie
- 1784 Den sværmende filosof as Philamon
- 1784 Det foregivne hekseri as Charlotte
- 1784 Kongen og forpagteren as Mally, Richards søster
- 1784 Lucile as Lisette, kammerpige
- 1784 Skotlænderinden as Pige i værtshus
- 1785 Arsene as Eugenia
- 1785 Cecilia as Dorthe
- 1785 Deucalion og Pyrrha as Pyrrha
- 1785 Friskytterne og mælkepigen as Lene, mælkepige
- 1785 Zemire og Azor as Fatime
- 1786 Aglae as Rodope
- 1786 Den foregivne lord as Irene, hans datter
- 1786 Den løgnagtige tjener as Dame
- 1786 Det uventede møde as Rezia
- 1786 Rosenbruden i Salency as Cecilie, rosenbruden
- 1787 Aglae as Aglae
- 1787 Arsene as Myris
- 1787 Cecilia as Lisbeth
- 1787 Den falske formodning as Leonore
- 1787 Den uforsigtige forsigtighed as Mirande
- 1787 Fiskerne as Lise
- 1787 Orfeus og Eurydice as Evrydice
- 1787 Ulysses von Ithacia as Pallas
- 1788 Aglae as Aglae
- 1788 Det talende skilderi as Isabelle
- 1788 Markedet as Grethe
- 1788 Skovbyggeren as Pauline
- 1789 Aglae as Aglae
- 1789 Den skinsyge kone as Miss Russet
- 1789 Den sværmende filosof as Claire
- 1789 Desertøren as Nanatte, en bondepige
- 1789 Eddikemanden og hans hjulbør as Hr. Delomers datter
- 1789 Orfeus og Eurydice as Evrydice

=== 1790s ===
- 1790 Apotekheren og doctoren as Leonora, Stødvels datter
- 1790 De to gerrige as Lucinde
- 1790 Den sværmende filosof as Claire
- 1790 Høstdagen as Grethe
- 1790 Julie as Julie
- 1790 Lucile as Lucile
- 1790 Selim og Mirza as Fatme
- 1790 Steffen og Lise as Lise
- 1791 Aglae as Aglae
- 1791 Bødkeren as Trine
- 1791 De forliebte haandværksfolk as Rosine
- 1791 De to gerrige as Lucinde
- 1791 De to sedler as Grethe
- 1791 De tre forpagtere as Trine
- 1791 Elskovs magt as Dulcimano
- 1791 Erast as Georgine
- 1791 Købmanden i Smyrne as Amalie
- 1791 Lilla as Lilla
- 1791 Richard Løvehjerte as Margrethe, grevinde af Flandern
- 1791 Syngesygen as Elise
- 1791 Taknemlighed og utaknemlighed as Vilhelmine
- 1791 Vennen af huset as Agathe
- 1792 Aglae as Aglae
- 1792 Arven i Marseille as Lucile
- 1792 Balders Død as Nanna
- 1792 De to smaa Savoyarder as Joseph
- 1792 De Vonner og Vanner as Sophie
- 1792 Feen Ursel as Berthe, dronning
- 1792 Høstgildet as Grethe
- 1792 Indianerne i England as Liddy
- 1792 Kolonien as Marine
- 1792 Papegøjen as Lady Amalie Bedford
- 1792 Pæretræet as Claudine
- 1792 Ringen as Caroline Selting
- 1792 Stregen i regningen as Henriette
- 1793 Borgerlykke as Mariane
- 1793 De to gerrige as Lucinde
- 1793 De to sedler as Grethe
- 1793 De to smaa Savoyarder as Joseph
- 1793 Den skinsyge kone as Miss Russet
- 1793 Figaro giftermaal as Cherubin
- 1793 Lilla as Lilla
- 1793 Lise og Peter as Lise
- 1793 Steffen og Lise as Lise
- 1793 Syngesygen as Elise
- 1793 Væddemaalet as Astrid
- 1794 Arsene as Myris
- 1794 Bødkeren as Trine
- 1794 Den røde hue as Hedevig
- 1794 Desertøren as Lovise
- 1794 Det talende skilderi as Isabelle
- 1794 Grovsmeden as Lene
- 1794 Høstdagen as Marie
- 1794 Kun seks retter as Fru Reinhard
- 1794 Købmanden i Smyrne as Amalie
- 1794 Peters bryllup as Grethe
- 1794 Silkeskoene as Edele
- 1795 Aftenen as Marie
- 1795 Barselstuen as Kone
- 1795 De forliebte haandværksfolk as Rosine
- 1795 De to gerrige as Lucinde
- 1795 De tre forpagtere as Trine
- 1795 Den sværmende filosof as Claire
- 1795 Entreprenøren i knibe as Merline
- 1795 Hekserie as Frue
- 1795 I oprørt vand er godt at fiske as Baroness
- 1795 Kjolen fra Lyon as Rosine
- 1795 Rosenbruden i Salency as Cecilie, rosenbruden
- 1795 Serenaden as Lene, bondepige
- 1796 Barselstuen as Kone
- 1796 Dyveke as Dronning Elisabeth
- 1796 Festen i Valhal as Skuld
- 1796 Hemmeligheden as Lene, ung bondepige
- 1796 Høstdagen as Marie
- 1796 Søofficererne as Fru Wotton
- 1796 Vinhøsten as Frøken von Tosberg
- 1796 Virtuosen nr. 2 as Fru von Borgen
- 1797 Bagtalelsens skole as Marie
- 1797 De forliebte haandværksfolk as Madam Constance
- 1797 Den bogstavelige udtydning as Jenny
- 1797 Den snedige brevveksling as Madame Fougere
- * 1797 Fejltagelserne as Frøken Trine
- 1797 Fusentasterne as Juliane
- 1797 Jockeyen as Alexandrine
- 1797 Modens sæder as Julie
- 1797 Navnsygen as Henriette
- 1797 Nonnerne as Priorinde
- 1797 Vestindianeren as Charlotte Rusport
- 1797 Zemire og Azor as Lisbe
- 1798 Aline, dronning af Golkonda as Hyrdinde
- 1798 Bagtalelsens skole as Pige hos lady Teazle
- 1798 Barselstuen as Dame
- 1798 Elskernes skole as Eveline
- 1798 Falsk undseelse as Emmy
- 1798 Figaro giftermaal as Suzanne
- 1798 Mariane as Madame Derval
- 1798 Pebersvenden as Grethe
- 1798 Victorine as Victorine
- 1799 Barselstuen as Dame
- 1799 De to brødre as Mally
- 1799 Falsk undseelse as Emmy
- 1799 Medbejlerne as Frøken Lydia Følig
- 1799 Natur røst as Suzon
- 1800 Barselstuen as Barselskone
- 1800 Bødkeren as Trine

=== 1800s ===
- 1800 De pudserlige arvinger as Emilie Falk
- 1800 De to brødre as Mally
- 1800 De to gerrige Lucinde as * 1800 Den lille matros Fulbert
- 1800 Landsbyteatret as Mistress Dazzle
- 1800 Min bedstemor as Miss Jenny
- 1800 Negeren as Frøken Julie Decan
- 1800 Optimisten as Fru Dorvil
- 1800 Serenaden as Lene, bondepige
- 1800 Søofficererne as Fru Wotton
- 1800 Ægteskabsforslaget as Rosaline
- 1801 Tjenestefolkenes skole as Kitty
- 1802 Apothekeren og doctoren as Rosalia
- 1802 Bagtalelsens skole as Pige hos Lady Teazle
- 1802 Den lille matros as Lise
- 1802 Herman von Unna as Sophie
- 1802 Hjemkomsten as Signe
- 1802 Mødet paa rejsen as Constanza
- 1802 Octavia as Charmion
- 1803 De to dage as Angelina
- 1803 Kærlighed uden strømper as Grethe, Johans forlovede
- 1803 Raptussen as Lady Dorset
- 1803 Rosenkæderne as Fru Lundborg
- 1804 Apothekeren og doctoren as Rosalia
- 1804 Balders død as Valkyrie
- 1804 Den logerende as Madam Søldal
- 1804 Kalifen af Bagdad as Lemaide
- 1804 Landsbypigen as Frøken Clare
- 1804 Skatten as Lucile
- 1805 De to Figaroer as Suzanne
- 1805 Herman von Unna as Prinsessen af Ratibor
- 1805 Syngesygen as Elise
- 1806 Apothekeren og doctoren as Rosalia
- 1806 En times ægteskab as Elise
- 1806 Familien i Amerika as Madam Daranville
- 1806 Rivalerne as Madam Orgon
- 1806 Romeo og Juliette as Cecile
- 1808 De to dage as Angelina
- 1809 Marionetterne as Fru Saint-Phar
- 1809 Sovedrikken as Abelone

=== 1810s ===
- 1810 Snedkeren i Lifland as Madame Merber, gæstgiverske
- 1811 Apothekeren og doctoren as Rosalia
- 1812 Apothekeren og doctoren as Rosalia
- 1812 Herman von Unna as Prinsessen af Ratibor
- 1813 De to brødre as Mally
- 1813 Hamlet as Gertrud
- 1814 Barselstuen as Dame / Kone
- 1814 Fiskerne as Birthe
- 1814 Natur røst as Claire
- 1815 Ariadne på Naxos as Orkade
- 1815 Grovsmeden as Grethe
- 1815 Herman von Unna as Prinsessen af Ratibor
- 1816 Den lille matros as Mo'er Thomas
- 1816 Hemmeligheden as Sophie
- 1817 Octavia as Kleopatra
- 1819 Nonnerne as Priorinde
- 1819 Peters bryllup as Kirsten

=== 1820s ===
- 1820 Barselstuen as Arianke Bogtrykkers
- 1820 De forliebte haandværksfolk as Madam Constance
- 1821 Den lille matros as Mo'er Thomas
- 1822 Ægteskabsskolen as Fru Silkeborg
- 1823 Hekserie as Frue
- 1823 Sovedrikken as Abelone
- 1826 Myndlingerne as Enke
- 1827 Det sidste middel as Baroness Düthelm

== Personal life ==
Dahlén married Carl Dahlén in 1792.
