= Sophie Daguin =

French actress and ballet dancer

Sophie Marguerite Daguin (26 March 1801 – 13 March 1881) was a French ballet dancer and choreographer. She spent her career in Sweden, where she became a star ballerina and ballet mistress of the Royal Swedish Ballet, and the principal of the ballet school.

== Life ==
Sophie Daguin was born in Paris, France. After six years education under Didelot in her hometown Paris, she was employed in the Ballet of the Royal Swedish Opera in Stockholm, where she made a successful debut in La fille mal gardée by Jean Dauberval in 1815.

She was a premier dancer in 1820–43, ballet master for the Royal Swedish Ballet in 1827–30, principal for the Ballet School in 1830–56 and pantomime dancer in 1843–56.

In 1827 she was appointed the first female ballet master of the Royal Ballet, though she did not hold this position alone but shared it jointly with Per Erik Wallqvist. She left her position before him to become the principal of the ballet school in 1830. Among her students were Charlotta Norberg and Thérèse Elfforss.

Until her forties, she was considered one of the greatest dancers in Stockholm, and she is referred to as the primadonna of the Royal Swedish Ballet in the 1830s, alongside Adolfina Fägerstedt, Carolina Granberg and Charlotta Alm. She was seen as a role model in her role interpretations. In her own choreographs, such as Max och Emma (Max and Emma) (1842), she introduced traditions from Paris.

Sophie Daguin never married. During this epoch, unmarried women where formally minors who needed a guardian to manage their finances, but the law allowed for unmarried women to apply for legal majority, and Sophie Daguin successfully did so in 1832.

Among her parts where the main part in the ballet Jenny or Engelska inbrottet i Skottland (The English burglary in Scotland), her part in the operas Den lilla slavinnan (The Little Slave) and Fra Diavolo, in Dansvurmen (The Dance Craze) by Selinder, Hemkosten (The Return) by Bournonville, Le Lac des fées by Filippo Taglioni and as the abbess in the famous ballet in the convent scene in Robert av Normandie, and in 1836 she studied the part of Fenella in Den stumma från Portici by Daniel Auber for Johanne Luise Heiberg in Copenhagen.

== See also ==
- Elisabeth Soligny

Preceded by Giovanni Battista Ambrosiani	Director of the Royal Swedish Ballet; 1827–1830	Succeeded by Per Erik Wallqvist
