= Anders Selinder =

Swedish ballet dancer (1806–1874)

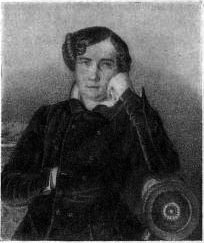

Anders Selinder (4 November 1806, in Stockholm – 6 November 1874, in Stockholm), was a Swedish ballet dancer, choreographer and director. He was ballet master of the Royal Swedish Ballet in 1833–1856.

== Life ==
Anders Selinder was the son of the jeweler A. Selinder in Stockholm.

Selinder premier dancer at the Royal ballet in the Royal Swedish Opera in Stockholm in 1829-46. In 1833, he was appointed ballet master at the age of twenty seven. He succeeded Per Erik Wallqvist, and worked closely to Sophie Daguin, who had previously shared the position of ballet master with Wallqvist and was principal of the Opera's ballet school. Together, Selinder and Daguin are considered to have upheld a high standard of the ballet.

Anders Selinder has been referred to as one of the most noted ballet masters of the royal ballet.

During this time, there was a new interest for the old Folk dance, which were at that time disappearing. Selinder preserved the folk dance by making them into ballets. He wrote several ballet compositions, and made the choreography to the national opera Värmlänningarne in 1846. He composed about 40 ballets and 40 opera ballets. Many of his ballets were used by the Folk dance movement where they are still performed, such as Daldans, Jössehäradspolska and Vingåkersdans.

In 1856, both Selinder and Sophie Daguin lost their positions at the royal ballet. This has been pointed out as the beginning of a certain decay which affected the Royal Swedish Ballet during the second half of the 19th century, when ballets were given much less space and often only allowed to be a complement of the opera plays.

After having lost his position as ballet master, Anders Selinder formed a ballet company and toured Sweden: this was the first travelling ballet company in Sweden. The company also performed folk dance and gave lessons in that art.

Between 1858 and 1866, Selinder managed a children's theatre. In 1870–1871, he was joint director in the theatre Ladugårdslandsteatern.

Among his famous students were Anna de Wahl, Sophie Cysch, Mathilda Hodell, Hilma Bruno, Hilda Bingvall, Zelma Eklund, Gardt and C. GL Callmén, Mina Pettersson, Sophie Dahl, Gunhild Rosén, Robert Sjöblom and Gustaf Ullberg.

Preceded by Per Erik Wallqvist	Director of the Royal Swedish Ballet; 1833–1856	Succeeded by Sigurd Harald Lund
