= Royal Swedish Ballet =

Swedish ballet company founded in 1773

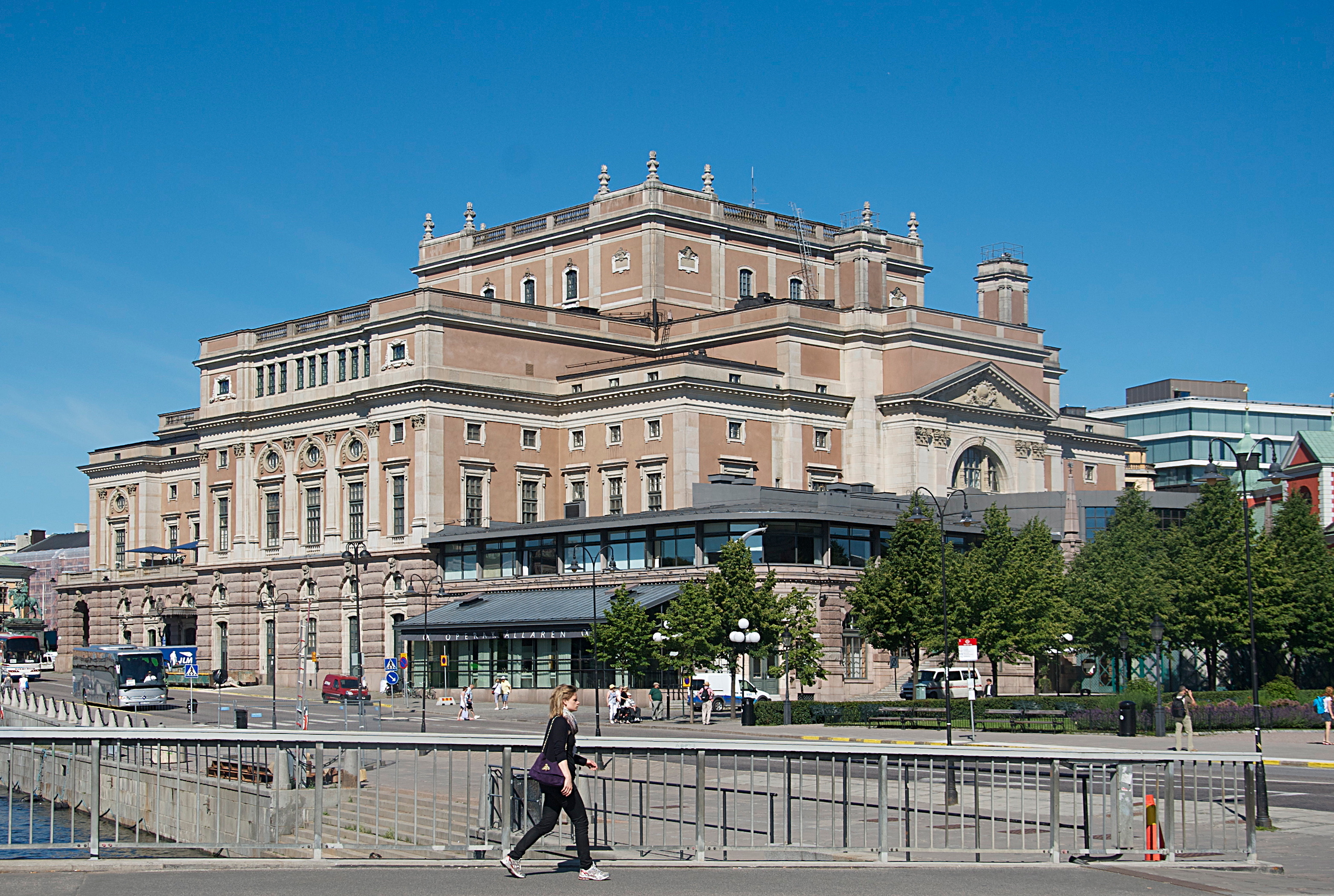

General information
- Name: Royal Swedish Ballet
- Local name: Kungliga Baletten
- Year founded: 1773
- Founder: King Gustav III
- Principal venue: Royal Swedish Opera, Stockholm, Sweden
- Website: www.operan.se/en/

Artistic staff
- Artistic director: Anders Hellström
- Music director: Alan Gilbert

Other
- Official school: Kungliga Svenska Balettskolan
- Formation: Principal Dancer; 1st Soloist; 2nd Soloist; Corps de Ballet

The Royal Swedish Ballet (Swedish: Kungliga Baletten) is one of the oldest ballet companies in Europe. Based in Stockholm, Sweden, King Gustav III founded the ballet in 1773 as a part of his national cultural project in response to the French and Italian dominance in this field; he also founded the Royal Swedish Opera and the Royal Dramatic Theatre. All of these were initially located in the old theatre of Bollhuset. The troupe was founded with the opening of the Royal Swedish Opera, which has served as its home since that time.

== History ==
In 1773, the cultural professions of acting, opera-singing and ballet-dancing in Sweden were all performed by foreign troupes. The first ballet performance was performed at the Swedish court when the French ballet troupe of Antoine de Beaulieu was hired at the court of Queen Christina in 1638, and the first Public ballet performance were performed by the foreign theatre troupes at the theatre of Bollhuset later the same century. The only exception had been the period of 1737–1753, when the first professional Swedish troupe of actors had performed at Bollhuset; during this period, ballets were performed by the first Swedish dancers in this troupe. The perhaps first ballet performed by professional native Swedish dancers was in the play Den afvundsiuke ("The Envious") by Olof von Dahlin in August 1738. However, no names are known about these first dancers. They were probably educated by Jean Marquard as dancing-master, and one of the dancers were also French, Gabriel Senac. In 1753, however, the first Swedish ballet, theatre and opera at Bollhuset were dissolved.

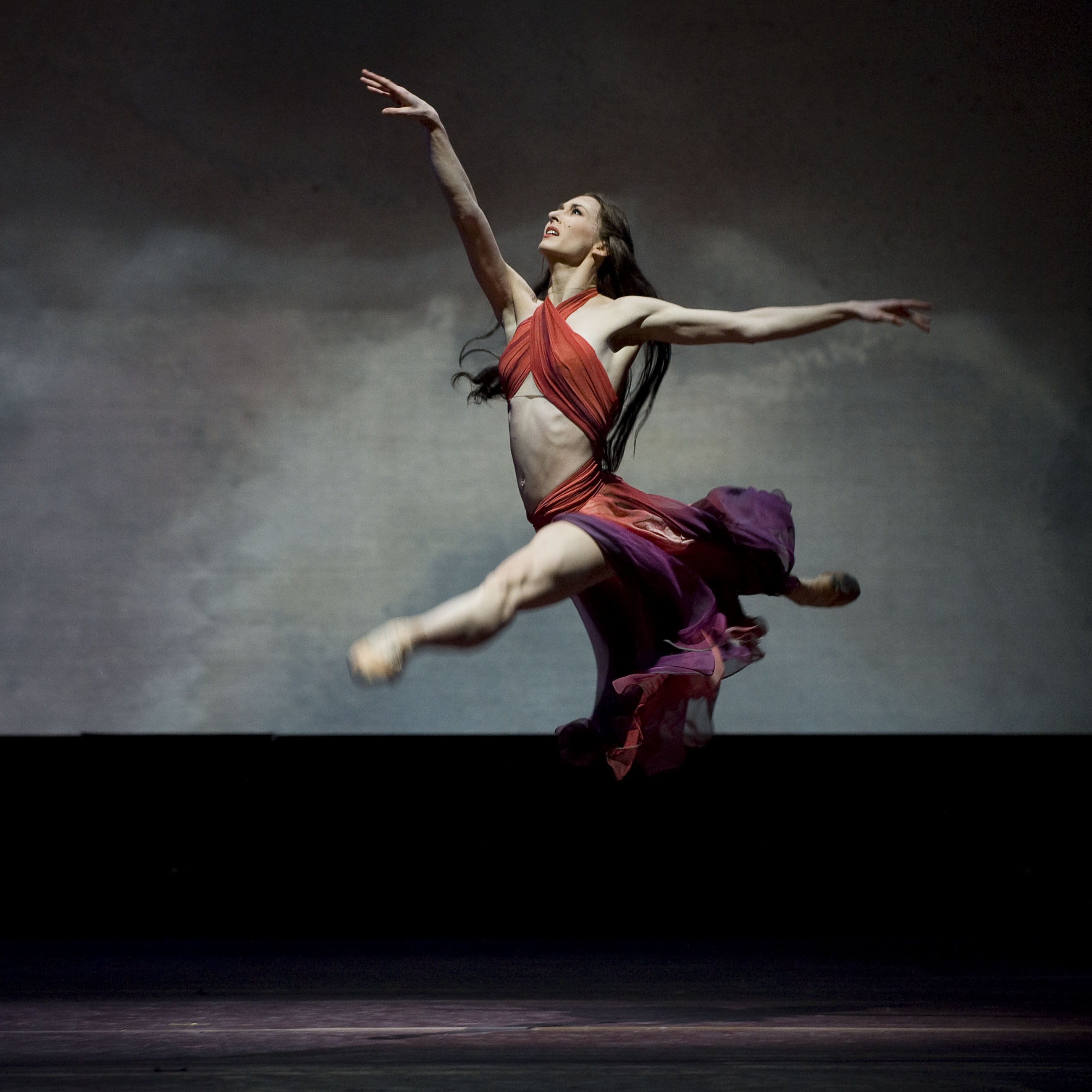
Nadja Sellrup as Esmeralda in "Ringaren i Notre-Dame" ("The Hunchback of Notre-Dame"), a 2009 ballet at the Royal Swedish Opera.

Gustav III wanted to create and educate native talents in these professions. To accomplish this, he used the same method in the ballet as he was to use with the theatre; by having the first generation of native dancers educated by foreign professionals. When he fired the French theatre-company to create his national-stage in 1773, he kept many of the French dancers of this troupe. Dancers from France, Italy and Belgium, such as Antoine Bournonville, Louis Gallodier, Giovanna Bassi and Julie Alix de la Fay were hired to perform and to educate Swedish students. Most of the first students to the troupe were taken among children to the staff at the royal court and to professional musicians, as were the first students to the theatre and the opera. In the first ballet-troupe in the national stage of 1773, they were very few native talents with former professional experience; one of them was Charlotte Slottsberg, who could be counted as the first native Swedish ballerina known by name. The greatest triumph of the Swedish ballet during the 18th century is considered to be the performance by Gallodier for the opera Gustav Adolf och Ebba Brahe (Gustav Adolf and Ebba Brahe) (1786); also the ballet Fiskarna (The Fishes) by Antoine Bournonville (1789) became a great success.

The ballet was closely linked to opera from the beginning; ballets were a part of the performances of the opera, and the dancers were also active on the Royal Dramatic Theatre. When the Royal Swedish Opera were closed down between 1806 and 1809–1812, the ballet was not closed, only moved to the theatre.

During the 19th century, new ballets were frequently made, and older ones seldom performed; En komisk balett (A comic ballet) by Louis Deland was given 127 times between 1796 and 1809, followed by La Fille Mal Gardée, given 54 times in 1812–1842. August Bournonville was active as a guest ballet master 1839, 1847, 1857, 1858 and 1861–1864, and his favorite Swedish ballerinas Charlotta Norberg and Johanna Sundberg educated students in his techniques. The ballet is considered to have been in a state of decay during the end of the 19th century; after the dismissal of Anders Selinder and Sophie Daguin in 1856, the ballet was used more as a supplement to the opera and not as an independent artform, and Sigurd Lund, a student of Bournonville, was not independent enough to prevent this. It was not until 1913, that the ballet returned to a more independent form.

The Kungliga Hovkapellet (Royal Swedish Orchestra), the orchestra of the Royal Swedish Opera, is the performing partner for the Royal Swedish Ballet.

Nicolas LeRiche is the director of the Royal Swedish Ballet. Birgitta Svendén is the general director of the Royal Swedish Opera. The members of Operans Balettklubb are supporters of the Royal Swedish Ballet.

== Ballet masters ==
- 1773–1803 : Louis Gallodier
- 1803–1804 : Filippo Taglioni
- 1804–1806 : Federico Nadi Terrade
- 1806–1816 : Louis Deland (1st time)
- 1817–1818 : Filippo Taglioni
- 1818–1820 : Louis Deland (second time)
- 1820–1823 : André Isidore Carey
- 1823–1827 : Giovanni Battista Ambrosiani
- 1827–1830 : Sophie Daguin (jointly with Wallqvist)
- 1827–1833 : Per Erik Wallqvist
- 1833–1856 : Anders Selinder
- 1856–1862 : Sigurd Harald Lund (1st time)
- 1862–1870 : Théodore Martin
- 1870–1886 : Theodore Marckl
- 1887–1890 : Robert Sjöblom
- 1890–1894 : Sigurd Harald Lund (second time)
- 1894–1901 : Max Glasemann
- 1901–1905 : Otto Zöbisch (1st time)
- 1905–1908 : Robert Köller
- 1911–1913 : Otto Zöbisch (second time)
- 1918–1920 : Michel Fokine
- 1922–1926 : Gunhild Rosén
- 1926–1927 : Lise Steier
- 1927–1931 : Jan Cieplinsky
- 1931–1951 : Julian Algo
- 1949–1951 : Antony Tudor
- 1953–1962 : Mary Skeaping
- 1962–1963 : Antony Tudor
- 1964–1966 : Brian Macdonald
- 1967–1971 : Erik Bruhn
- 1971–1980 : Ivo Cramér
- 1980–1984 : Gunilla Roempke
- 1986–1993 : Nils Ake-Häggbom
- 1993–1995 : Simon Mottram
- 1995–1999 : Frank Andersen
- 1999–2001 : Petter Jacobsson
- 2002–2008 : Madeleine Onne
- 2008–2011 : Marc Ribaud
- 2011–2017 : Johannes Öhman
- 2017-2025 : Nicolas Le Riche
- 2025- : Anders Hellström

== Dancers ==
=== Principal Dancers ===
Name	Nationality	Training	Joined the Royal Swedish Ballet	Promoted to Principal Dancer	Other Companies
Daria Ivanova	Russia	School of Irina Tihomirnova; Dance Center Timofeevoi; Rudra Béjart Lausanne	2012	2017	Béjart Ballet
Dawid Kupinski	Poland	National Ballet School Gdansk	2012	2016	Royal Danish Ballet Béjart Ballet
Luiza Lopes	Brazil	Escola Municipal de Bailados de São Paulo; Núcleo de Danca Nice Leite Ilara Lopes; Royal Ballet School; English National Ballet School	2015	2022	Sao Paulo Dance Company
Kentaro Mitsumori	Japan	Zion Ballet; John Cranko Schule	2017	2022	
Daniel Norgren Jensen	Denmark	Swedish Ballet School Malmo; Canada's National Ballet School; Royal Ballet School	2009	2017	L-E-V Dance Company; Berlin State Ballet
Nathalie Nordquist	Sweden	Royal Swedish Ballet School	1998	2005	Les Ballets de Monte-Carlo
Nadja Sellrup	Sweden	Royal Swedish Ballet School	1994	2007	Bayerisches Staatsballett; Victor Ullate Company; Spanish National Dance Company
Maya Schonbrun	United States	Master Ballet Academy	2022	2025	
Dmitry Zagrebin	Russia	Moscow State Academy of Choreography	2015	2017	Bolshoi Ballet; Stanislavski and Nemirovich-Danchenko Theatre; Queensland Ballet

=== 1st Soloist Dancers ===
Name	Nationality	Training	Joined the Royal Swedish Ballet	Promoted to 1st Soloist	Other Companies
AdiLiJiang Abudureheman	China	Hong Kong Academy for Performing Arts; Shanghai Far East Intermediate Ballet Arts Academy	2007	2012	
Sarah Erin Keaveney	United Kingdom	Royal Ballet School	2018	2023	
Anthony Lomuljo	Sweden United States	Juilliard School	2012	2014	Gothenburg Dance Company; Tanztheater Wuppertal Pina Bausch; Sasha Waltz and Guests
Minji Nam	South Korea	Perm State Choreographic College; Heinz-Bosl Ballet Academy	2007	2014	Aalto Theatre Semperoper
Rikako Shibamoto	Japan	Megumi Ballet School Vienna State Ballet Academy	2022	N/A, Joined as 1st Soloist	Vienna State Ballet; Royal Danish Ballet
Desislava Stoeva	Bulgaria	National School of Dance Arts Sofia	2007	2012	Finnish National Ballet
Taylor Yanke	Canada	Académie de Danse Princesse Grace	2021	2024	

== Stockholm 59° North ==
Stockholm 59° North is a chamber company of soloist dancers from the Royal Swedish Ballet.

Artistic Director is Mia Hjelte.

== See also ==
- Royal Swedish Opera
- Drottningholm Palace Theatre
- Confidencen – Ulriksdal Palace Theatre
- Charlotte Slottsberg
- Hedda Hjortsberg
- Ulrika Åberg
