= Friis Cabinet =

Danish government from 1920 to 1920

Cabinet of M. P. Friis
- 30th Cabinet of Denmark

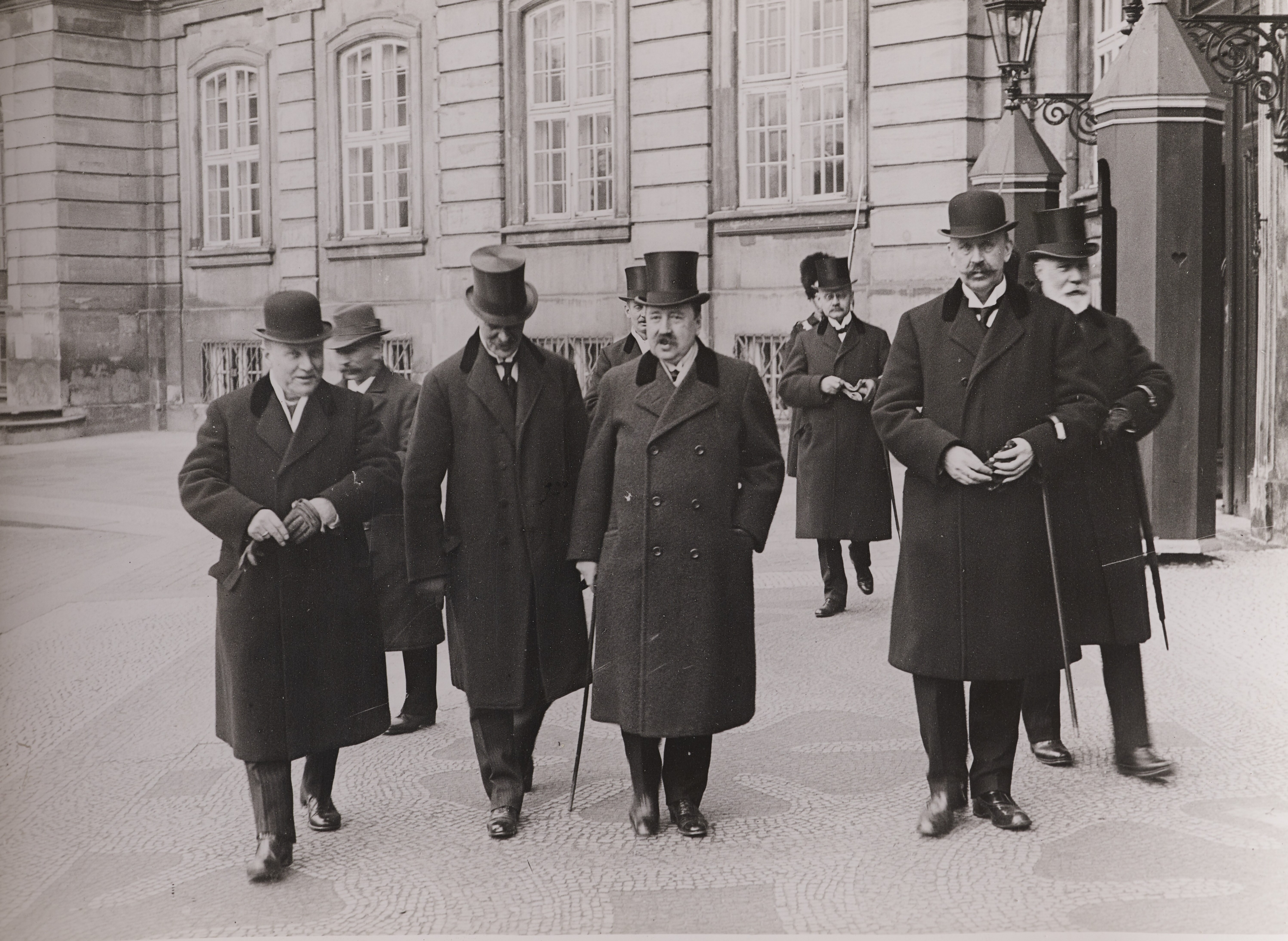
- The cabinet leaving Amalienborg
- Date formed: 5 April 1920
- Date dissolved: 5 May 1920

People and organisations
- Monarch: Christian X
- Prime Minister: Michael Pedersen Friis
- Total no. of members: 11
- Status in legislature: Caretaker government

History
- Predecessor: Liebe
- Successor: Neergaard II

The Cabinet of M. P. Friis was the government of Denmark from 5 April 1920 to 5 May 1920. It was created during the Easter Crisis of 1920 and after the Cabinet of Otto Liebe, as a compromise until elections could be held later that year.

== List of ministers ==
The cabinet consisted of these ministers:

Cabinet members
Portfolio	Minister	Took office	Left office	Party
Prime Minister & Minister of Defence	Michael Pedersen Friis	5 April 1920	5 May 1920	Independent
Minister of Foreign Affairs	Otto Scavenius	5 April 1920	5 May 1920	Independent
Minister for Finance	Michael Koefoed	5 April 1920	5 May 1920	Independent
Minister for Ecclesiastical Affairs	Emil Ammentorp	5 April 1920	5 May 1920	Independent
Minister for Education	Peder Jørgen Pedersen	5 April 1920	5 May 1920	Social Democrats
Minister of Justice	Frederik Carl Gram Schrøder	5 April 1920	5 May 1920	Independent
Minister of the Interior	Henrik Vedel	5 April 1920	5 May 1920	Independent
Minister of Public Works	K. Riis-Hansen	5 April 1920	5 May 1920	Independent
Minister of Agriculture	Christian Sonne	5 April 1920	5 May 1920	Independent
Minister of Trade	Hans Peter Prior	5 April 1920	5 May 1920	Independent
Ministry of Social Affairs	Jens Jensen	5 April 1920	5 May 1920	Social Democrats

Preceded by Liebe	Cabinet of Denmark; 1924-1926	Succeeded by Neergaard II
