= Peter Rochegune Munch =

Danish historian and politician

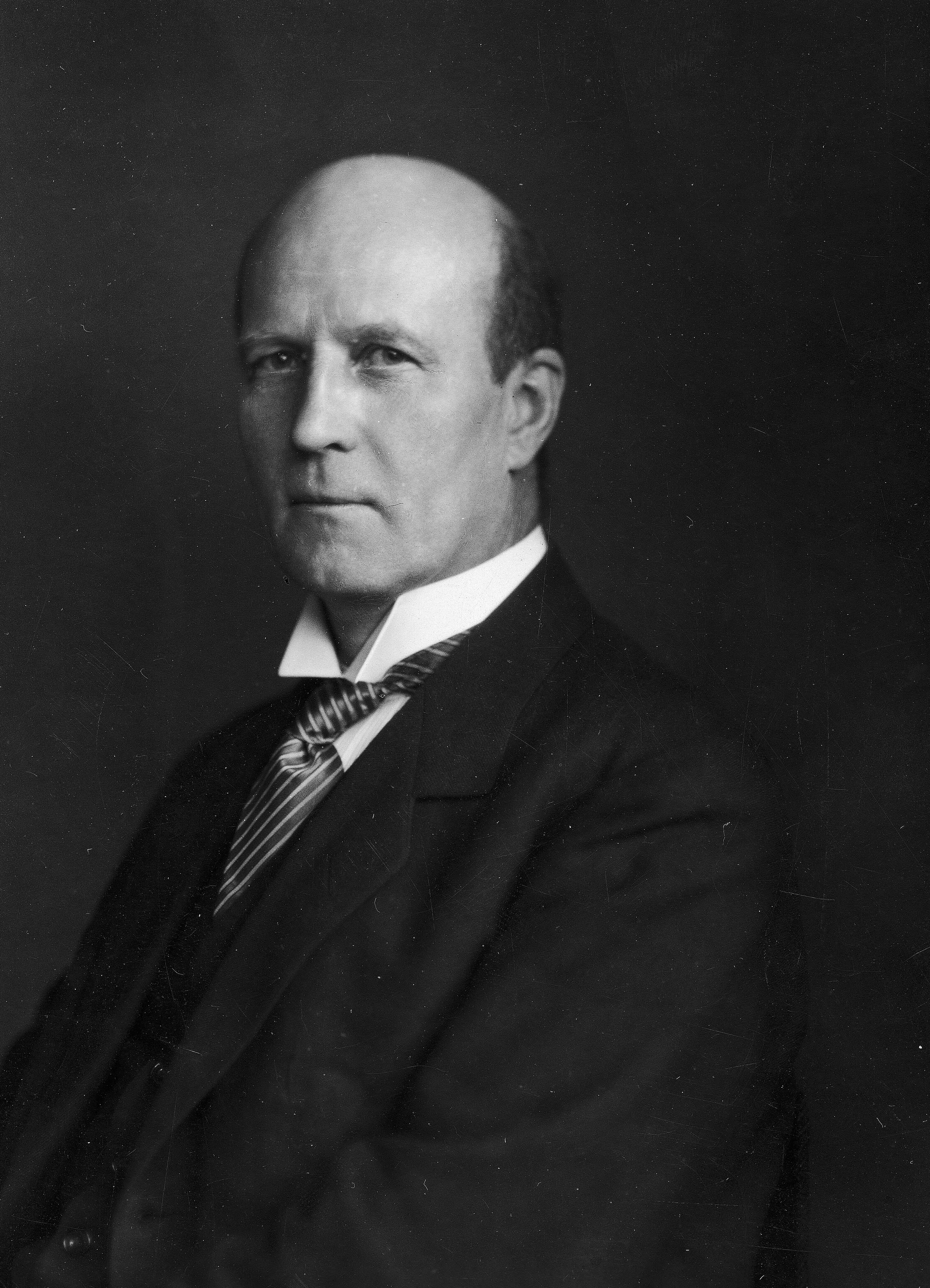
- c. 1930

Minister of Foreign Affairs
- In office 30 April 1929 – 8 July 1940
- Prime Minister: Thorvald Stauning
- Preceded by: Laust Jevsen Moltesen
- Succeeded by: Erik Scavenius

Minister of Defence
- In office 21 June 1913 – 30 March 1920
- Prime Minister: Carl Theodor Zahle
- Preceded by: Klaus Berntsen
- Succeeded by: Henri Konow

Minister of the Interior
- In office 28 October 1909 – 5 July 1910
- Prime Minister: Carl Theodor Zahle
- Preceded by: Klaus Berntsen
- Succeeded by: Jens Jensen-Sønderup

Personal details
- Born: 25 July 1870 Redsted, Denmark
- Died: 12 January 1948 (aged 77) Copenhagen
- Party: Danish Social Liberal Party
- Spouse: Elna Sarauw (m. 1902; died 1945)
- Children: 1
- Education: University of Copenhagen
- Occupation: Diplomat; Historian; Politician

Peter Rochegune Munch (in Danish usually referred to as P. Munch; 30 April 1870 – 8 July 1948) was a prominent Danish historian and politician. He was a leading member of the Radikale Venstre, and represented Langeland in parliament.

As Foreign Minister of Denmark from 1929 to 1940, he greatly influenced Danish foreign policy well beyond his own time in office. However, his role in the years leading to the German occupation of Denmark has ensured that his legacy remains controversial.

== Background ==
Peter Munch was an illegitimate child, growing up without a father in a small provincial town on Mors. His family was poor, and from an early age he worked to help his mother. He quickly showed great skill in school, and his mother decided to put him through high school, despite the financial strain.

After having completed national service, Munch began studying at the University of Copenhagen. Lacking independent wealth, he worked in several jobs to support himself throughout his studies. He graduated with a first-class degree in history in 1895, and achieved a doctoral degree in 1900, writing a thesis on Danish local government in the 16th Century.

Around this time he married the well-known feminist Elna Sarauw with whom he had one son. Munch was known as an introvert. He insisted on always using the most formal forms of address, and referred to people using their last names, even his friends. This is the reason why he became known only as P. Munch. But his work ethic was strong, and his output in terms of books, pamphlets, articles (both academic and for newspapers), letters, diaries and other notes, is immense.

== Positions ==
As an historian Munch was an advocate of the inclusion of social sciences in primary school history lessons . He was also the author of several textbooks on Danish and World history, some of which were published in more than 15 editions, and remained in use well into the 1960s. As an academic historian Munch belonged to the positivist tradition, which held sway in Denmark during his lifetime. The income from his vast production of textbooks and other academic works finally lifted him out of poverty, and allowed him to pursue a political career.

P. Munch had been deeply influenced by the thinking of Viggo Hørup, especially on matters of foreign and security policy. Hørup had been deeply shaken by the ease of the German victory in the Second War of Schleswig, and had once famously remarked during a parliamentary debate on the Danish armed forces: "What's the use of it all?" ("Hvad skal det nytte?").

Following from this kind of thought Munch thus considered a territorial defence of Denmark impossible, and illusions about this downright dangerous. All Denmark could hope for would be to maintain good relations with the great powers, Germany first and foremost among them, and to avoid confrontation at all cost. These ideas stayed with him throughout his political career, and he managed to stamp them quite firmly on Danish Foreign Policy.

It was thus natural for him to be one of the founders of Det Radikale Venstre the (Danish Social Liberal Party), which has always had a strong pacifist streak, and to be one of the authors of the new party's Odense Program in 1905. Due to his intellect and work capacity Munch soon rose to be one of the leading members of the new party. He was elected to parliament (Folketinget) in 1905 and retained his seat until 1943.

== Political career ==
=== Early career ===
In 1909 Radikale Venstre formed its first government, and Munch became Minister of the Interior. He didn't have much impact in this position, as the government was ousted already after 10 months in office.

The second time the party formed a government, again under the leadership of Carl Theodor Zahle, Munch became Minister of Defence. His long period in this office coincided with World War I. Denmark remained neutral throughout, which was entirely in accordance with the views of P. Munch and the foreign minister, Erik Scavenius. However many, including the King Christian X, considered Munch to be too soft on defence to hold this position during a time of crisis. But Munch stayed put, and loyally - indeed ironically, given his own bleak assessment of the feasibility of any territorial defence—oversaw the largest peacetime mobilisation in Danish history, as it had been envisaged in the Defence Bill of 1909.

Munch's influence in the government reached beyond his brief as defence minister. Because of his seemingly endless stamina in negotiations with other parties, his mastery of even the most complex brief, and his ice-cold temper, he often represented the government when difficult compromises had to be reached over both normal legislation and matters relating to the war.

The government was finally pushed out of office during the Easter Crisis of 1920, and over the following years most of the leading lights of the Zahle government retired from politics. Munch on the other hand remained active, and by 1926 he had become the party's undisputed leader. During this time he worked to prevent any rapprochement between Radikale Venstre and Venstre, the party they had originally split from. Instead he gave tacit support to the first social democratic government, which sat from 1924 to 1926.

In 1929 Munch and Radikale Venstre delivered the crucial votes to bring down Thomas Madsen-Mygdal's Venstre government during the debate on the state budget. In the following election the Social Democrats and Radikale Venstre achieved an outright majority, and subsequently entered into one of the most successful and durable coalitions in Danish political history.

=== Foreign minister ===
A commonplace saying during the long rule of the Social Democratic/Radical coalition was that Prime Minister Thorvald Stauning handled domestic policy, while P. Munch was solely in charge of foreign policy. This was simplified, of course, as a high degree of agreement existed between the two in both spheres of policy.

In domestic politics the government tackled the world economic crisis by introducing currency controls, and through a comprehensive economic crisis package agreed with Venstre in the early months of 1933. At the same time a series of social reforms were carried out, which laid the earliest foundations that today's welfare state was built upon. These reforms created a rudimentary social safety net, and did much to lessen the appeal of totalitarian and anti-democratic political movements during the crisis years. The government also enacted a new criminal code in 1930, which abolished capital punishment and de-criminalised homosexuality, and which, although amended many times, remains in force today.

The coalition was re-elected with solid majorities in 1933, 1936, and 1939. However an attempt in 1939 to modify the Constitution failed in a referendum.

However, Munch's influence was arguably greatest on the conduct of Denmark's foreign relations.

Munch's main political goal was (unilateral) disarmament and the preservation of Danish neutrality. He served as a delegate to the League of Nations from 1920 to 1938.

=== Occupation years ===
P. Munch's last years were not happy ones. As the occupation wore on, and especially after the liberation in 1945 his record as foreign minister came under severe attack from many sides. In late 1945 he had to subject to the indignity of prolonged interrogation by a Parliamentary Committee set up to investigate the circumstances surrounding the occupation. Up until his death in 1948 there were repeated suggestions that he should be put on trial for negligence (and even treason). However, when the parliamentary commission delivered its final report in 1953, Munch was largely exonerated.

This did not, though, stop the continued blaming of Munch for the situation Denmark had been in. His policies were largely disowned by the political elite (his own Radical party the only exception). 'Never again a 9 April' ('Aldrig mere en 9. April') became a mantra for Danish politicians, and gradually a new bipartisan consensus emerged between the Liberals, Conservatives and Social Democrats regarding Danish foreign and security policy, which led to membership of NATO in 1949.

== The Rostock Myth ==
Danish historian Jon Galster claimed P. Munch visited the German town of Rostock just a few weeks before the German occupation and met with several Nazi dignitaries, Heinrich Himmler among them. According to Galster, Munch had been warned in advance about the German intentions towards Denmark, and had agreed to making the occupation happen as peacefully as possible. This supposedly accounted for the limited Danish response on 9 April 1940, and Munch's own willingness to surrender once the invasion was under way. In 1990, Galster published the book 9. april - en sand myte ('9 April, a true myth'), detailing his theory.

Political offices
Preceded by Klaus Berntsen	Interior Minister of Denmark; 28 October 1909 – 5 July 1910	Succeeded by Jens Jensen-Sønderup
Preceded by Klaus Berntsen	Defence Minister of Denmark; 21 June 1913 – 30 March 1920	Succeeded by Henri Konow
Preceded by Laust Jevsen Moltesen	Foreign Minister of Denmark; 30 April 1929 – 8 July 1940	Succeeded by Erik Scavenius
Party political offices
Preceded by Carl Theodor Zahle	Political leader of the Danish Social Liberal Party; 1928–1940	Succeeded by Jørgen Jørgensen
