= 1910 Danish Folketing election =

Election for the lower house of Danish Parliament

- 20 May 1910
- All 114 seats in the Folketing; 58 seats needed for a majority
Party	Leader	Vote %	Seats	+/–
Venstre	Klaus Berntsen	34.08	57	+9
Social Democrats	Thorvald Stauning	28.30	24	0
Højre		18.60	13	−8
Social Liberals	Carl Theodor Zahle	18.60	20	+5
This lists parties that won seats. See the complete results below.
Prime Minister before	Prime Minister after
Carl Theodor Zahle; Social Liberals	Klaus Berntsen; Venstre

Folketing elections were held in Denmark on 20 May 1910. The result was a victory for Venstre, which won 57 of the 114 seats. Voter turnout was 74.8%.

== Results ==
Party	Votes	%	Seats	+/–
Venstre	118,902	34.08	57	+9
Social Democratic Party	98,718	28.30	24	0
Højre	64,904	18.60	13	–8
Danish Social Liberal Party	64,884	18.60	20	+5
Independents	1,448	0.42	0	–6
Total	348,856	100.00	114	0
Valid votes	348,856	99.14		
Invalid/blank votes	3,028	0.86		
Total votes	351,884	100.00		
Registered voters/turnout	470,392	74.81		
Source: Nohlen & Stöver
