= 1915 Danish Folketing election =

Election for the lower house of Danish Parliament

- 7 May 1915
- All 114 seats in the Folketing; 58 seats needed for a majority
| Party | Leader | Seats | +/– |
|---|---|---|---|
| Venstre | Klaus Berntsen | 43 | −1 |
| Social Democrats | Thorvald Stauning | 32 | 0 |
| Social Liberals | Carl Theodor Zahle | 31 | 0 |
| Højre | | 8 | +1 |
This lists parties that won seats. See the complete results below.
| Prime Minister before | Prime Minister after |
|---|---|
| Carl Theodor Zahle; Social Liberals | Carl Theodor Zahle; Social Liberals |

Folketing elections were held in Denmark on 6 May 1915. In order to make amendments to the constitution, the government called for the dissolution of both the Folketing and the Landsting to allow a new Rigsdag to make the revisions. However, as this was during World War I, no campaigning took place, and 104 of the 114 were uncontested.

The corresponding Landsting election was held on 22 May.

== Results ==
| Party | Seats | +/– |
|---|---|---|
| Venstre | 43 | –1 |
| Social Democratic Party | 32 | 0 |
| Danish Social Liberal Party | 31 | 0 |
| Højre | 8 | +1 |
| Total | 114 | 0 |
Source: Rosenkrantz
