= Henri Konow =

Governor of the Danish West Indies (1862–1939)

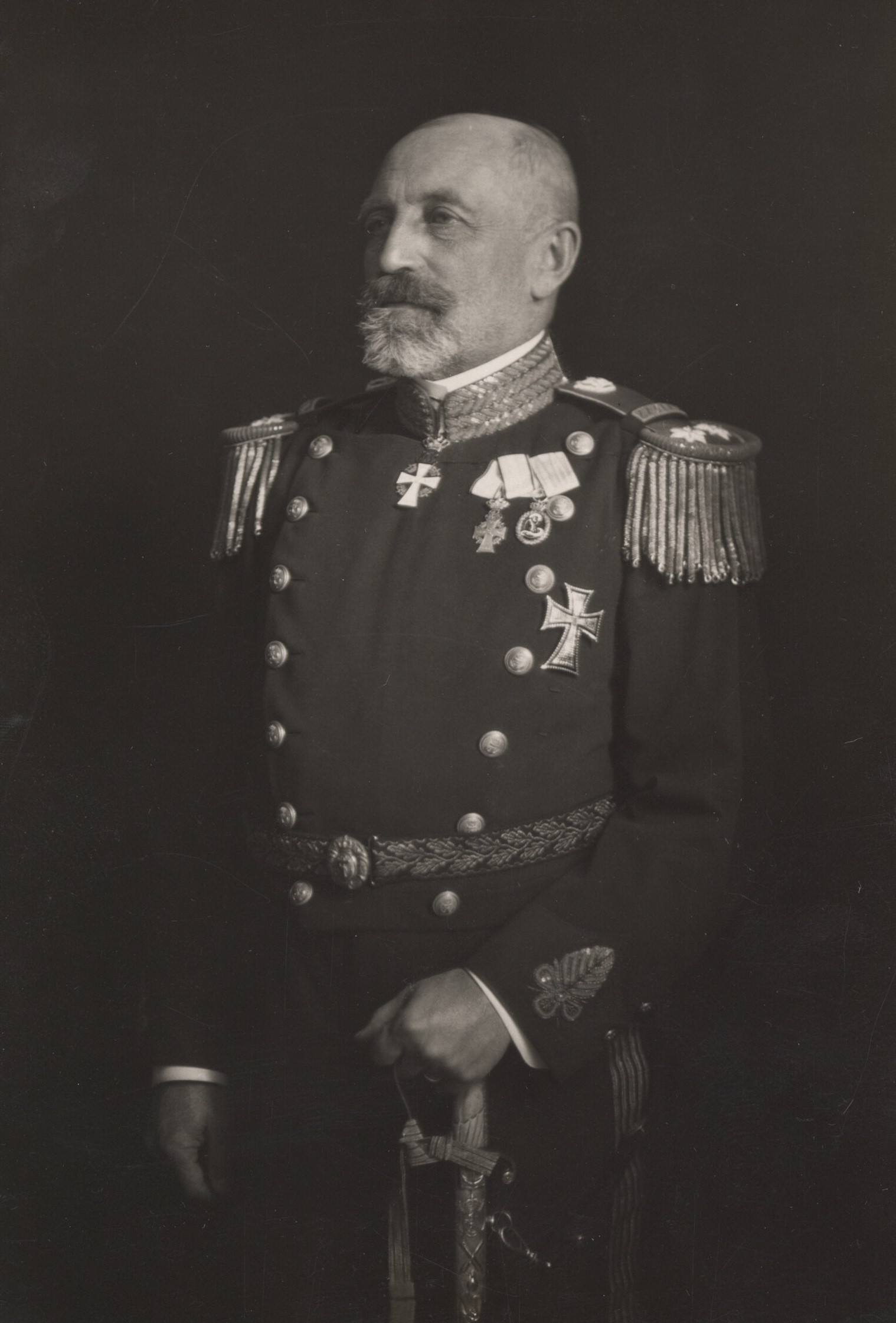

Minister of Defence
- In office 30 March 1920 – 5 April 1920
- Prime Minister: Otto Liebe
- Preceded by: Peter Rochegune Munch
- Succeeded by: Michael Pedersen Friis

Minister of Foreign Affairs
- In office 30 March 1920 – 5 April 1920
- Prime Minister: Otto Liebe
- Preceded by: Erik Scavenius
- Succeeded by: Otto Scavenius

Governor of the Danish West Indies
- Acting
- In office 3 October 1916 – 31 March 1917
- Preceded by: Christian Helweg-Larsen
- Succeeded by: Edwin Taylor Pollock (as Governor of the U.S. Virgin Islands)

Personal details
- Born: 7 February 1862 Copenhagen, Denmark
- Died: 18 January 1939 (aged 76) Odense, Denmark
- Resting place: Beldringe Cemetery, Præstø
- Spouse: Jacobine Cathrine Margrethe Worsaae (m. 1892)
- Parent(s): Hans Jacob Hesselberg Konow (father); Ida Marie West (mother)
- Occupation: Politician, medical doctor, diplomat
- Cabinet: Liebe

Military service
- Allegiance: Denmark
- Branch/service: Royal Danish Navy
- Years of service: 1879–1927
- Rank: Vice Admiral

Henri Konow (7 February 1862 – 18 January 1939) was a Danish naval officer, vice-admiral, and the last governor of the Danish West Indies, overseeing the transfer of administration to the United States of America following the Treaty of the Danish West Indies in 1916 under which the Kingdom of Denmark sold the islands now named the US Virgin Islands to the United States in exchange for US$25,000,000 in gold.

== Early life ==
Henri Konow was born on 7 February 1862 in Copenhagen, Denmark, the son of the diplomat and ship-owner Hans Jacob Hesselberg Konow and Ida Marie West.

== Career ==
Konow started his naval career in 1879 as a cadet in the Danish Navy, advancing to the rank of second lieutenant after 4 years on 30 August 1883. He continued ascending through the naval ranks until becoming a vice-admiral in 1923, four years before his retirement. Furthermore, he was made a knight of the Order of the Dannebrog on 28 October 1895; he gradually progressed through the ranks of the Order and was finally awarded the Grand Cross of the Order 1925.

Commander with Grand Cross of the Royal Swedish Order of the Sword 1926 (Commander 1st Class 1922; Chevalier 2nd Class 1893).

=== World War I ===
By World War I, Konow had advanced to commander, and was in charge of the Valkyrien, stationed at the Danish West Indies. On 3 October 1916, he was named acting governor, to oversee the transfer of authority to the United States on 31 March 1917.

=== Easter Crisis ===
During the Easter Crisis of 1920, Konow was Foreign Minister and Defence Minister of Denmark in the Cabinet of Otto Liebe.

== Personal life ==
He married Jacobine Cathrine Margrethe Worsaae on 21 October 1892 at the Church of Holmen in his native city, Copenhagen, Denmark. In 1893, he published an autobiography.

Political offices
Preceded by Lars Christian Helweg-Larsen	Governor of the Danish West Indies (acting); 1916–1917	Succeeded by Edwin Taylor Pollock (First U.S. Governor)
Preceded by Erik Scavenius	Foreign Minister of Denmark; 30 March 1920 – 5 April 1920	Succeeded by Otto Scavenius
Preceded by Peter Rochegune Munch	Defence Minister of Denmark; 30 March 1920 – 5 April 1920	Succeeded by Michael Pedersen Friis
