= Liebe Cabinet =

Danish cabinet of the 1920 Easter Crisis

Cabinet of Liebe
- 29th Cabinet of Denmark

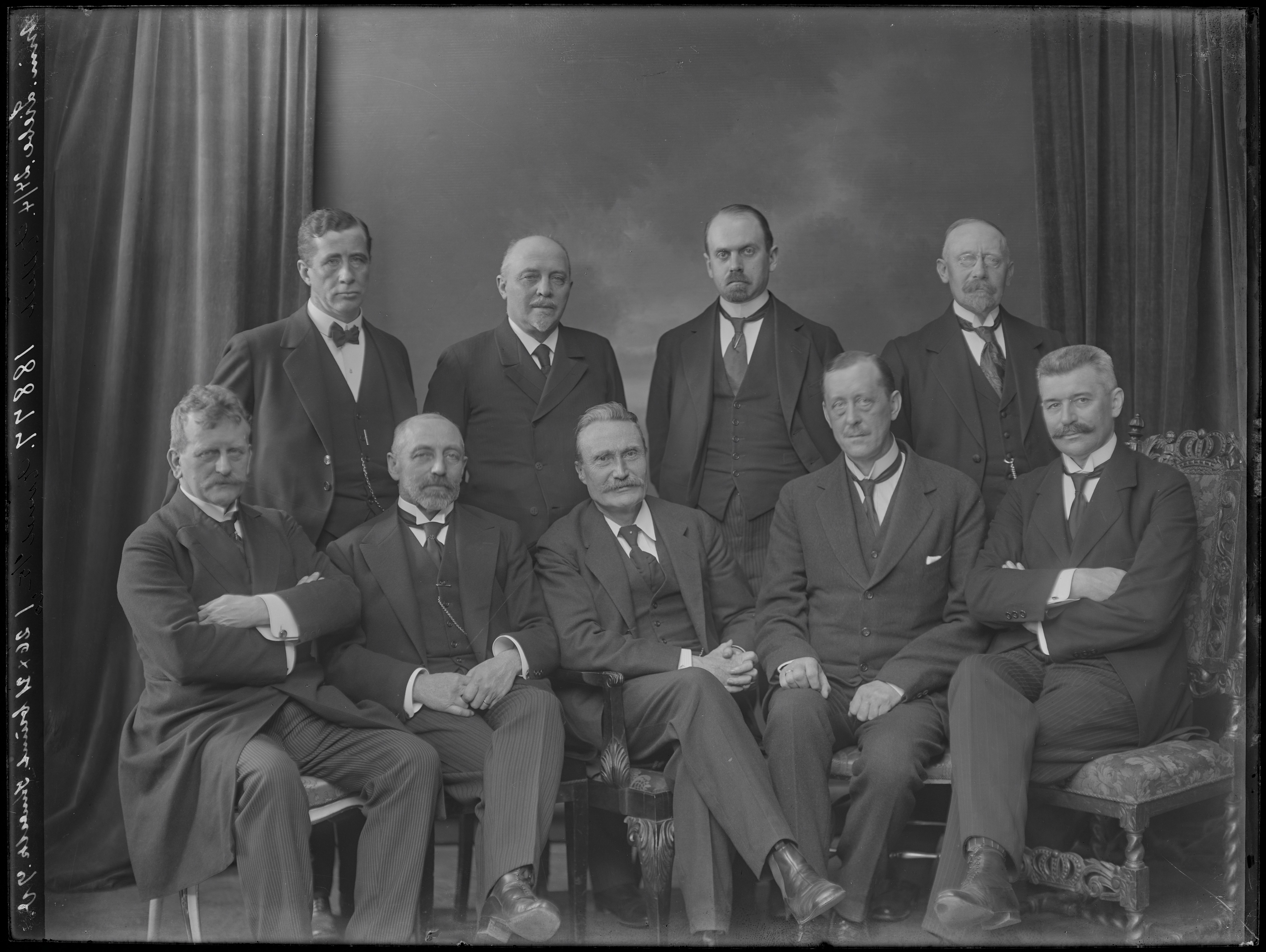
- Date formed: 30 March 1920
- Date dissolved: 5 April 1920

People and organisations
- Monarch: Christian X
- Prime Minister: Otto Liebe
- Total no. of members: 9
- Status in legislature: Caretaker government

History
- Incoming formation: Easter Crisis of 1920
- Predecessor: Zahle II
- Successor: Friis

The Cabinet of Liebe was created, as a result of Christian X's decision to dismiss the Second cabinet of Zahle, during the Easter Crisis of 1920. The cabinet was supposed to maintain control of the country until elections could be held. However, the dismissal of Zahle was widely unpopular and with the potential overthrow of the Danish crown, Christian dismissed Liebe, installing as a compromise Cabinet of Friis until elections could be held later that year.

== List of ministers ==
Cabinet members
| Portfolio | Minister | Took office | Left office | Party | Ref |
|---|---|---|---|---|---|
| Prime Minister | Otto Liebe | 30 March 1920 | 5 April 1920 | Independent | |
| Minister of Foreign Affairs & Minister of Defence | Henri Konow | 30 March 1920 | 5 April 1920 | Independent | |
| Minister for Finance | Hans Hjerl Hansen | 30 March 1920 | 5 April 1920 | Independent | |
| Minister for Ecclesiastical Affairs | Heinrich Edvard Hass | 30 March 1920 | 5 April 1920 | Independent | |
| Minister for Education | Niels Thorkild Rovsing | 30 March 1920 | 5 April 1920 | Independent | |
| Minister of Justice | Otto Liebe | 30 March 1920 | 2 April 1920 | Independent | |
| Minister of Justice | Kristian Sindballe | 2 April 1920 | 5 April 1920 | Independent | |
| Minister of the Interior & Minister of Agriculture (act.) | Waldemar Oxholm | 30 March 1920 | 5 April 1920 | Independent | |
| Minister of Public Works | N.C. Monberg | 30 March 1920 | 5 April 1920 | Independent | |
| Minister of Trade | Magnus Suenson | 30 March 1920 | 5 April 1920 | Independent | |

| Preceded by Zahle II | Cabinet of Denmark; 1920-1920 | Succeeded by Friis |
