= Frederik Carl Gram Schrøder =

Danish civil servant (1866-1936)

Frederik Carl Gram Schrøder (19 July 1866 – 13 August 1936), usually referred to as F.C.G. Schrøder and also known as Fritz Schrøder was a Danish civil servant, Governor of Danmarks Nationalbank from 1925 and until his death.

In 1920 he served briefly as Minister of Justice in the Cabinet of M.P. Friis, a caretaker cabinet mainly consisting of civil servants which under the leadership of Michael Pedersen Friis was in office from 5 April to 5 May triggered by the Easter Crisis of 1920.

== Private life ==
Schrøder was born in Copenhagen. His two sons were Henning Schrøder, who became director of the Ministry of Foreign Affairs, and Povl Schrøder, a painter. His daughter Karen Margrethe Schrøder married the architect, urban planner and writer Steen Eiler Rasmussen and was the mother of the linguist Una Canger.
