= Hans Peter Prior =

Danish industrialist (1866–1936)

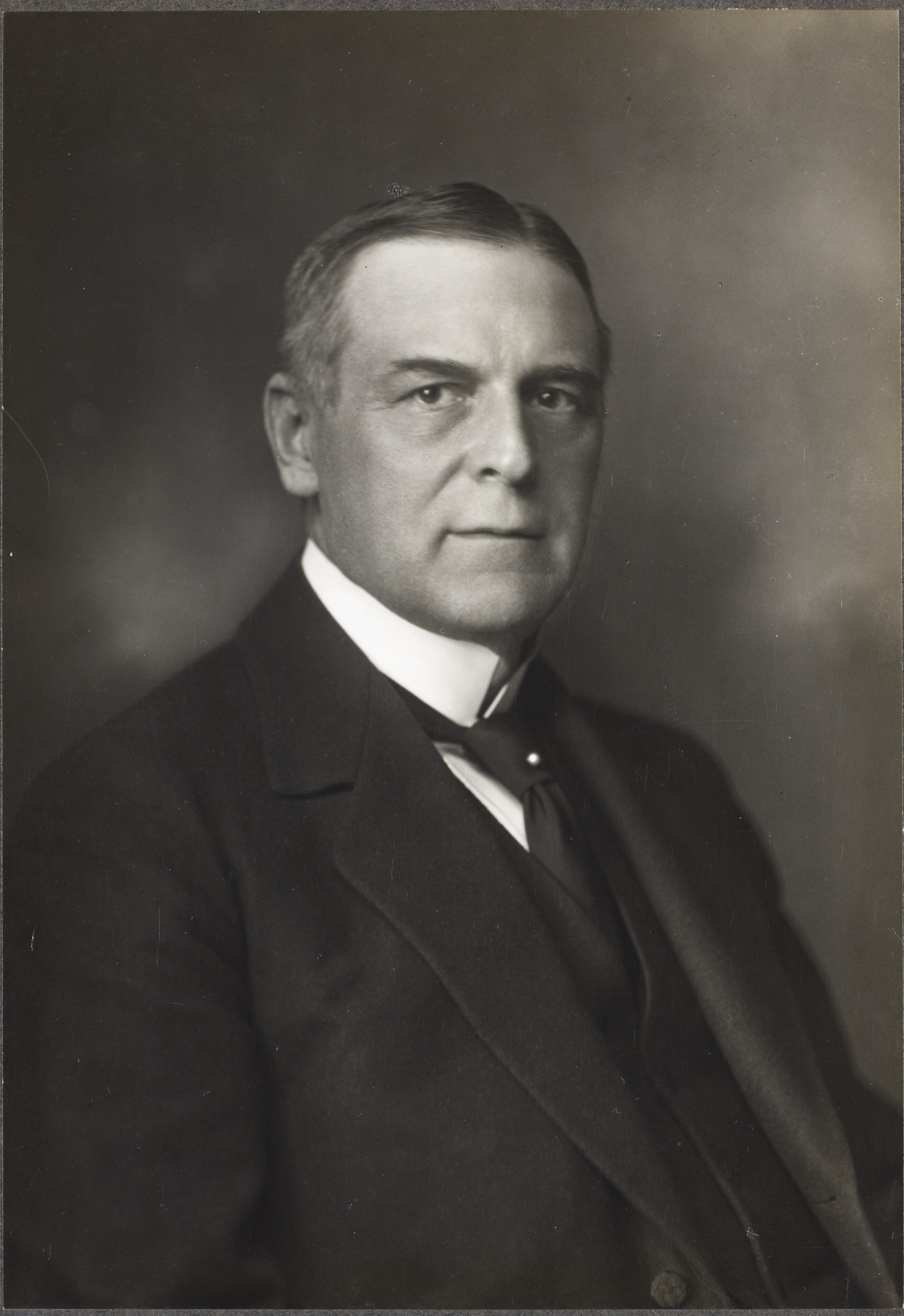
H. P. Prior photographed by Peter Elfelt.

Hans Peter Prior (25 February 1866 – 27 September 1936) was a Danish industrialist who founded NKT A/S.

== Early life and education ==
Prior was born on 25 February 1866 in Copenhagen, the son of shipbuilding engineer Johannes Andreas Prior (1840–1905) and Fernanda Frederikke Louise Jacobine Ekman (1843–93). His paternal grandfather was DFDS-founder Hans Peter Prior (1813–1875). The family lived in the Prior House on Bredgade in Copenhagen. He had four younger brothers and two younger sisters. His brothers were bank manager Ferdinand Prior, business executive Viggo Prior, lawyer Otto Prior and architect Alexis Prior.

Prior attended Borgerdyd School and later received a technical education in C. P. Jürgensens Mekaniske Etablissement which was later supplemented with a couple of years of theoretical studies. In 1888, he traveled to the US where he worked for some time at the Edison Machine Works.

== Career ==
Upon his return to Copenhagen in 1891, Prior started a small-scale production of cables and electrical wires in a basement at Store Kannikestræde 14. In 1893, he inaugurated a new factory at Ryesgade 105. The name of the firm was changed to Nordisk Kabelfabrik. On 21 February 1898, it was merged with another enterprise as Aktieselskabet Nordiske Kabel- og Traadfabriker with Prior as the merger's first managing director.

From 1908 to 1912, Prior served as president of the Danish Electro-Technical Association (Elektroteknisk Forening). In 1910, he became president of Industriforeningen. In the same year, when the Danish Industry Council (Industrirådet) was established, Prior was appointed as its first president. For health reasons, he gave up the chairmanship as early as 1911, and he was instead replaced by Alexander Foss. During the First World War, from 1914 1918, Prior was instrumental in promoting the council's trade policy tasks. He was a member of the England committee and signed the first of the council's agreements with the belligerent powers as an envoy for the Industrial Council in London in 1915. During the world war, he also held a number of chairmanships in the special committees that were set up to distribute the imported goods among the individual industrial enterprises, and after the establishment of the German submarine blockade, he traveled with director Christian Cold to America to obtain an arrangement with the United Nations.

In January 1920, when decease forced Alexander Foss to retire, Prior returned to the post as president of the Industry Council. In April 1920, he was appointed as Minister of Trade in the interin Cabinet of M. P. Friis. The collapse of Landmandsbanken in 1922, Prior became part of the investigations. He was ultimately sentenced to three months in prison. Prior was ultimately sentenced to 120 days in prison for complicity in these transactions by the Supreme Court (the high Rastern High Court had merely sentenced him to a fine of DKK 800 for violating the Danish Companies Act). As a result of his involvement in the Landmandsbanken affair, Prior resigned in 1923 as managing director of Nordisk Kabel- og Traad, just as he also had to give up his post as chairman of the Industrial Council.

After serving his sentence, in 1925 Prior established the Danish Galosche- and Gummifabrik (now Codan Rubber) in Køge, He was the managing director of the company until 1931. Until his death, he also served on the boards of the Joint Representation of Danish Industry and Crafts and the Danish Technological Institute. He also remained a member of the Danish Electrotechnical Committee.

== Personal life ==
On 22 September 1893, in Kristiania, Prior married to Margarethe Cathrine Bergh (1866–1927). She was a daughter of Supreme Court attorney Johannes Bergh (1837–1906) and Anna Johanne (Hanne) Borchgrevink (1838–1906). After the death of his first wife, on 27 January 1929 in Vrejlev, he was married to Inger Adelhaid Kaas (1894–1971). She had previously been married to Hans Kaj Niels Rand (1891–1944). She was the daughter of landowner and hotel owner Niels Adolph Christoph K. (1868–1936) and Sarah Henriette adopt. Heiberg (born 1853).

Orior died in Gellerup on 27 September 1936. He is buried at Copenhagen's Western Cemetery.

== Awards ==
In 1916, Prior was created a Knight of the Order of the Dannebrog. In 1920, he was awarded the Cross of Gonour.
