= Michael Pedersen Friis =

Danish civil servant (1857–1944)

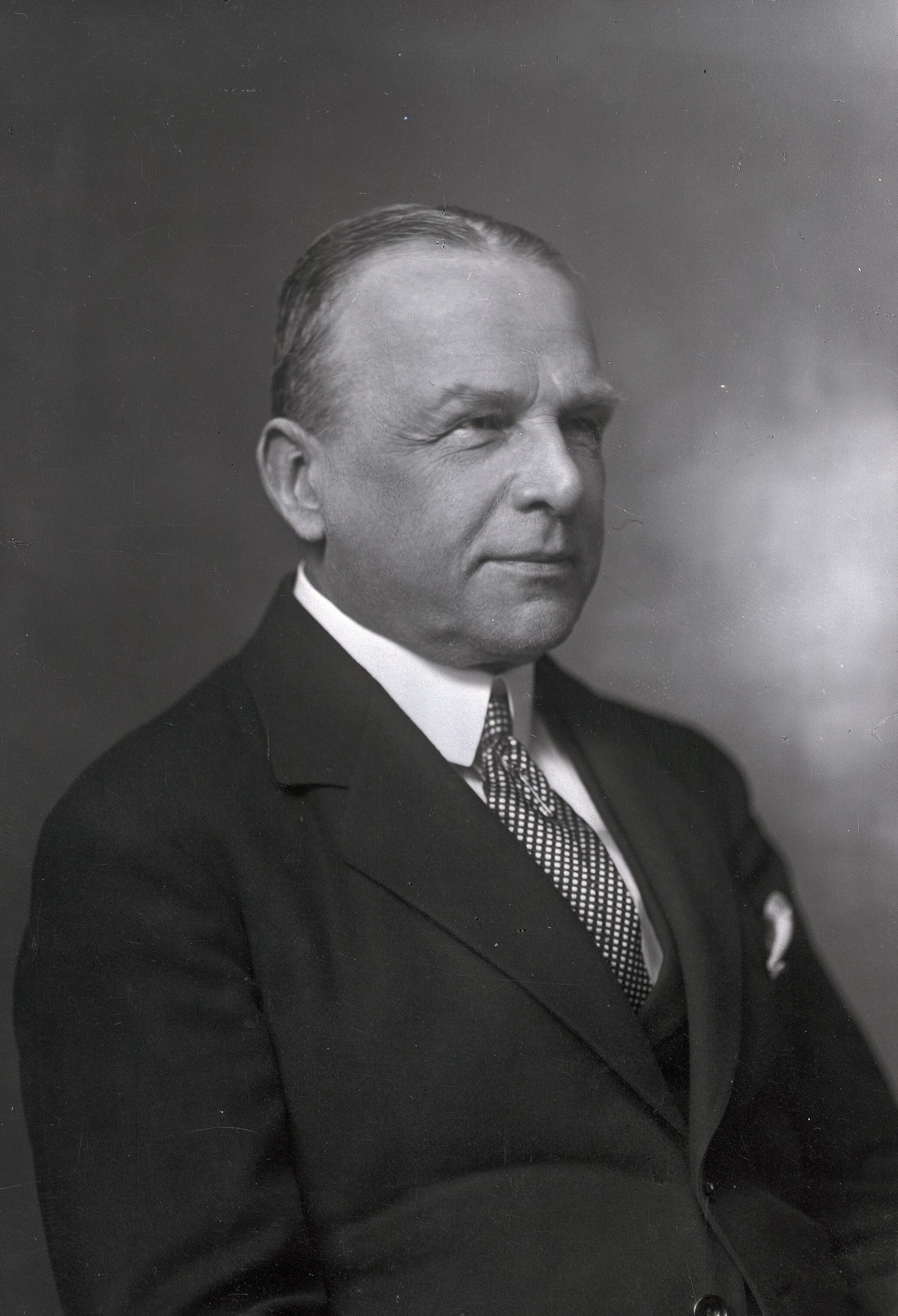

Prime Minister of Denmark
- In office 5 April 1920 – 5 May 1920
- Monarch: Christian X
- Preceded by: Otto Liebe
- Succeeded by: Niels Neergaard

Minister of Defence
- In office 5 April 1920 – 5 May 1920
- Prime Minister: Himself
- Preceded by: Henri Konow
- Succeeded by: Klaus Berntsen

Personal details
- Born: 22 October 1857 Odense, Denmark
- Died: 24 April 1944 (aged 86) Copenhagen, Denmark
- Party: Independent
- Education: University of Copenhagen

Michael Pedersen Friis (22 October 1857 – 24 April 1944) was a Danish civil servant who served as Prime Minister of Denmark from 5 April 1920 to 5 May 1920.

== Biography ==
M.P. Friis became cand.jur. from the University of Copenhagen in 1883. From 1904 to 1911 was head of department in the Ministry of Justice. He was from 1911 to 1923 he was the public trustee of Denmark. On 29 March King Christian X had dismissed Prime Minister Carl Theodor Zahle and replaced him with Otto Liebe, but this use of power by the king triggered the Easter Crisis of 1920 (Påskekrisen 1920) and Otto Liebe resigned 5 days later. Michael Pedersen Friis was then appointed head of a caretaker cabinet (forretningsministerium) to lead Denmark until elections could be held and a new government appointed.

Under Michael Pedersen Friis, the necessary changes were made to integrate the land acquired in the Schleswig Plebiscite into the election rules, and new elections were held. On 5 May 1920 Niels Neergaard became the new prime minister in a government consisting only of the Liberal party (Venstre).

Political offices
| Preceded by Otto Liebe | Prime Minister of Denmark; 5 April 1920 – 5 May 1920 | Succeeded by Niels Neergaard |
| Preceded by Henri Konow | Defence Minister of Denmark; 5 April 1920 – 5 May 1920 | Succeeded by Klaus Berntsen |
