= Otto Scavenius =

Danish diplomat and politician (1875–1945)

Otto Christian Jakob Jørgen Brønnum Scavenius (in Danish usually referred to as O.C. Scavenius) (10 December 1875 – 10 September 1945) was Danish Foreign Minister from 5 April 1920 - 5 May 1920, during the Danish 1920 Easter Crisis.

Before this appointment, he served as a high-ranking diplomat, occupying one of the Foreign Ministry's two positions as Permanent Secretary. Following his brief career in politics, he returned to the diplomatic scene and in 1921, he was appointed the first Director of the Foreign Ministry (1921–22). He advocated a more active and more trade-oriented Danish foreign policy, and was considered to be pro-British.

He was succeeded as foreign minister by one of his relatives, Harald Scavenius.

Political offices
Preceded by Henri Konow	Foreign Minister of Denmark; 5 April 1920 – 5 May 1920	Succeeded by Harald Scavenius
