= Ove Rode =

Danish politician, newspaper editor and minister

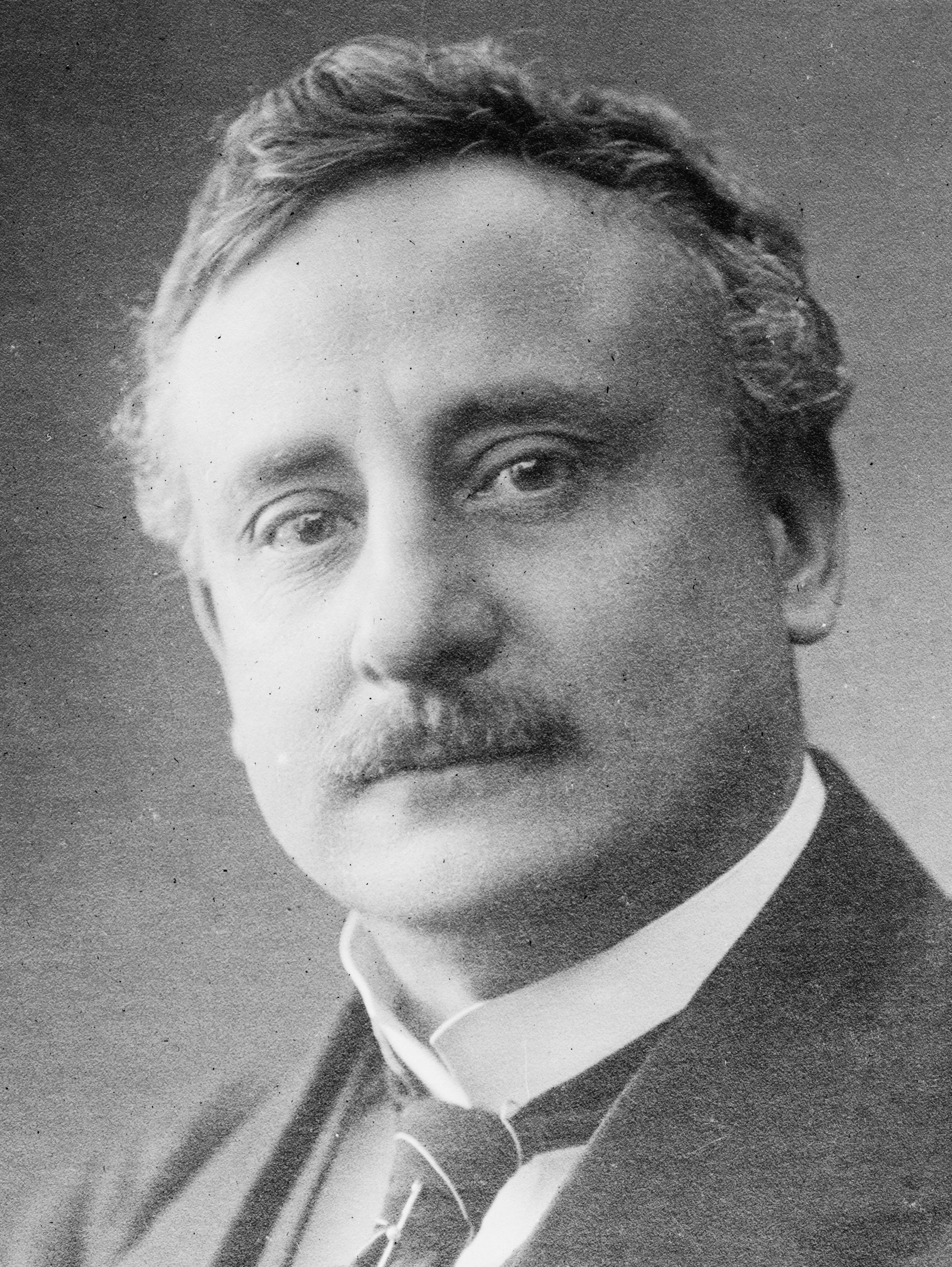
Ove Rode

Ove Rode (31 August 1867 – 11 July 1933) was a Danish politician, writer, newspaper editor, and Minister of Interior Affairs for Det Radikale Venstre.

== Biography ==
As a young journalist, Rode was editor of his own newspaper, København, from 1889 until 1892. He was later hired at the newspaper Politiken, where he was political editor from 1905 to 1913.

He first ran for member of the Folketing—a chamber of the Danish parliament, the Rigsdag—in 1897, and he was a member of the Folketing from 1909 to 1927.

In 1913, he became minister of interior affairs in the Cabinet of Zahle II, and being responsible for interior politics during World War I, he became a controversial figure. With the August laws of 1914, he introduced an until then unseen government control of the supply and cost of a number of goods, intending to counteract the effects of the war.

In 1927, he left politics and became editor-in-chief of Politiken, a position he held until 1933.

He was the son of Margrethe Rode and a brother of writer Helge Rode.

Political offices
Preceded by Jens Jensen-Sønderup	Minister for Interior Affairs of Denmark; 21 June 1913 – 30 March 1920	Succeeded by Waldemar Henry Theodor Oxholm
Party political offices
Preceded by Carl Theodor Zahle	Parliamentary group leader of the Danish Social Liberal Party; 1909–1910	Succeeded by Carl Theodor Zahle
