= NKT A/S =

Power company in Denmark

- Company type: Publicly traded Aktieselskab
- Traded as: Nasdaq Copenhagen: NKT
- Industry: Power cables
- Founded: 1891
- Founder: H.P. Prior
- Headquarters: Copenhagen, Denmark
- Key people: Claes Westerlind (CEO), Jens Due Olsen (Chairman)
- Products: Power cables
- Revenue: EUR 3.3bn (2024)
- Number of employees: app. 6,000 (2024)
- Website: https://www.nkt.com/

NKT A/S (formerly NKT Holding A/S) is a Danish power cable producer and accessory manufacturer based in Copenhagen. The company is listed on the Nasdaq Copenhagen and has approximately 6000 employees with production facilities in 10 European countries.

It is best known for its offshore high-voltage DC cables that are used to connect offshore wind farms to onshore grids. They have also supplied projects with high voltage power highways and are a specialist within building wires for residential, business, and industrial sites.

== History ==
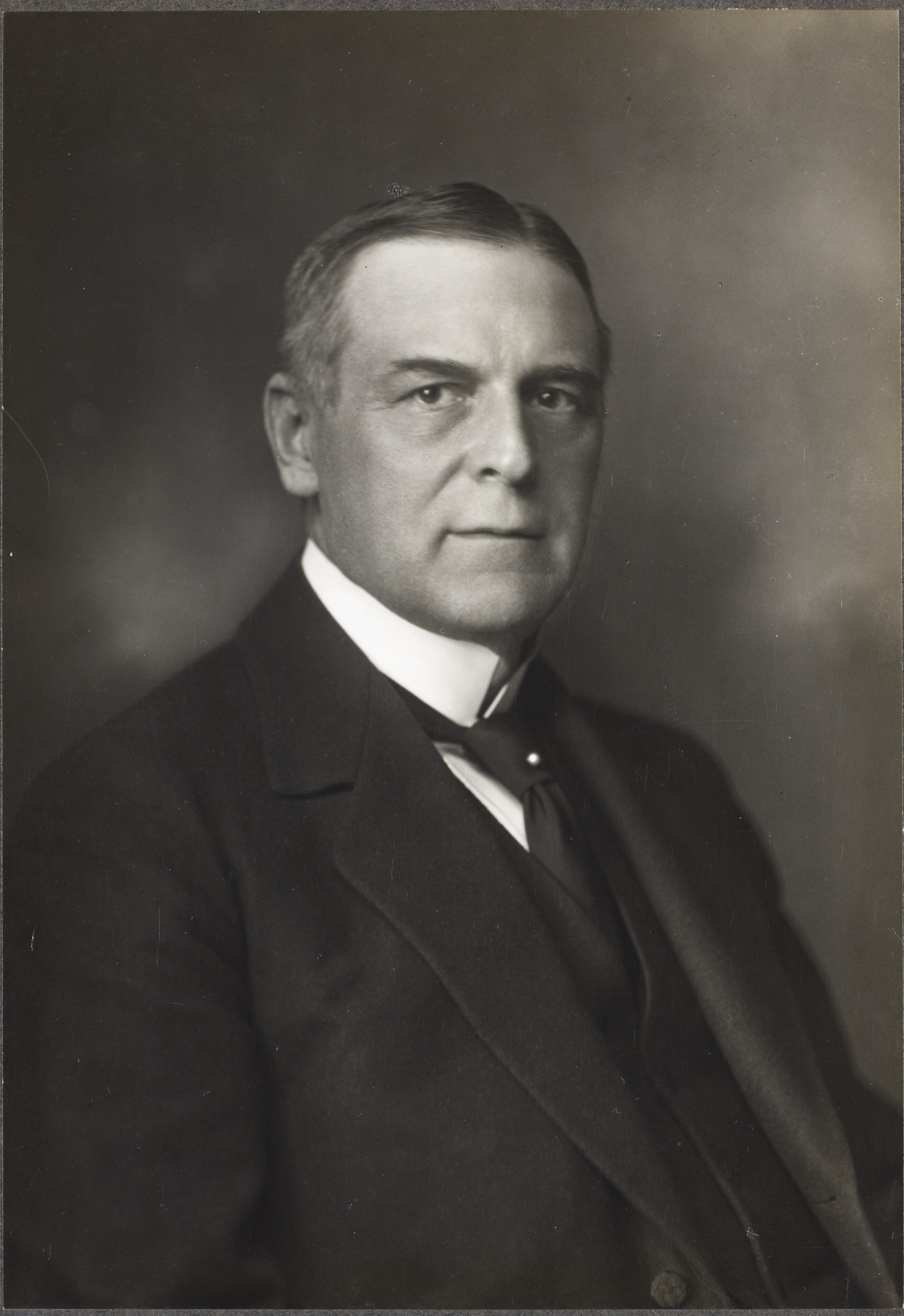
Hans Peter Prior

The company was founded in 1891 by Hans Peter Prior, who would later become chairman of the Danish industry council, under the name of Nordisk Elektrisk Ledningstraad og Kabel-Fabrik. It quickly expanded, buying up other companies. A new factory on Ryesgade was inaugurated. In 1898, it was named Nordiske Kabel og Traadfabrik, from which is derived its current name: NKT.

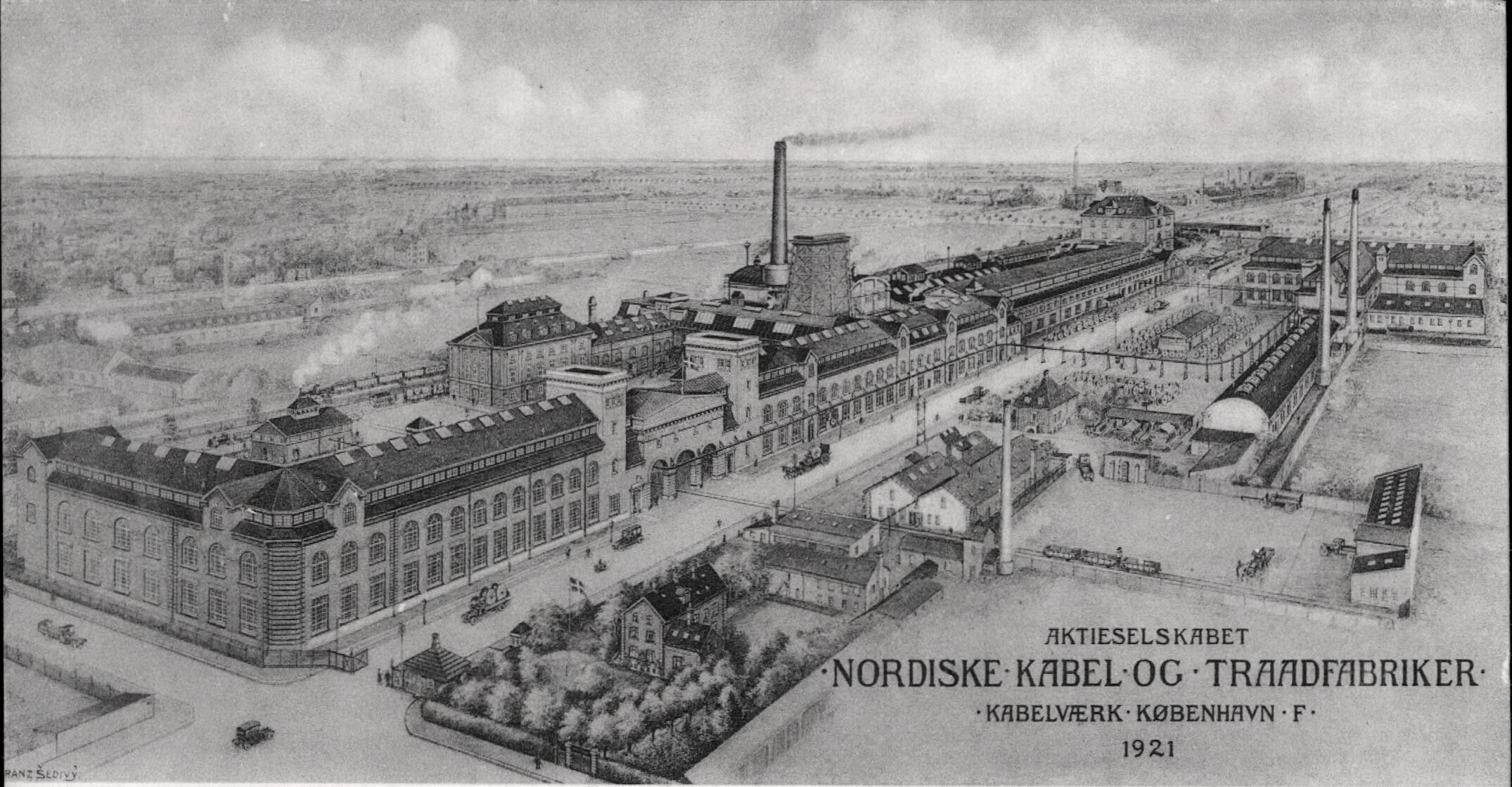
The former NKT cable factory on La Coursvej in Copenhagen.

A new cable factory was constructed at La Cour Vej in 1907 and a new head office was constructed next to the factory in the 1930s.

Over the next decades the company was active in a number of sectors outside the cable industry, including glass, aluminium, steel, nails, fasteners etc., primarily for the Danish market. In the 1960s, NKT started recycling scrap from cable production in its facility in Stenlille, Denmark. The company introduced lead-free cables and halogen and PVC-free cables as part of a renewed environmental focus in the 1990s.

In 1990 the current company structure was established. Over the next 10 years, a series of mergers and sell offs were made with the aim of concentrating on a smaller number of core businesses. NKT Holding sold the electricity distribution manufacturer Lauritz Knudsen to Schneider in 1999, the semi-conductor manufacturer GIGA to Intel in 2000, and the underwater pipe manufacturer NKT Flexibles in 2012.

In 1999 NKT acquired German cable manufacturer Felten & Guilleaume, doubling the production capacity and adding businesses in the Czech Republic, China, and Austria. NKT headquarters subsequently moved to Cologne. In 2013, NKT acquired Swedish cable manufacturer Ericsson Cables in Falun, Sweden.

In 2016, the NKT Board of Directors announced the intent to split NKT Holding A/S into two separately listed companies, NKT (incl. NKT Photonics) and Nilfisk, as a consequence of the acquisition of ABB HV Cables business. The split took place in October 2017.

In 2017, NKT acquired Swedish-Swiss High-Voltage Cable Manufacturer, ABB HV Cables from the ABB Group including the high-voltage plant in Karlskrona and the cable-laying vessel NKT Victoria along with offices in Karlskrona, Alingsås, and part of the offices in Malmö, Rotterdam and Mannheim.

In 2024, NKT sold NKT Photonics to focus 100% on electricity cables. In the same year, NKT acquired SolidAl, a Portugal-based power cable manufacturer, adding medium- and high-voltage capacity to meet the growing demand from grid upgrades and renewable energy projects across Europe.

== Business areas ==
NKT is split into four business lines:

- Solutions focuses on HVDC and HVAC power cable solutions for interconnectors, offshore wind, and power-from-shore applications.
- Applications focuses on building wires, low- and medium-voltage power cables as well as renewable projects.
- Accessories focuses on cable joints, cable connectors, and cable terminations between 12–550 kV.
- Service and Installation focuses on cable services related to jointing, repairing and monitoring.

== Leadership ==
Members of the Board of Directors of NKT A/S:

- Jens Due Olsen, Chairman of the Board of Directors
- René Svendsen-Tune, Vice Chairman of the Board of Directors
- Anne Vedel
- Nebahat Albayrak
- Andreas Nauen
- Karla Marianne Lindahl
