= Otto Liebe =

Danish politician

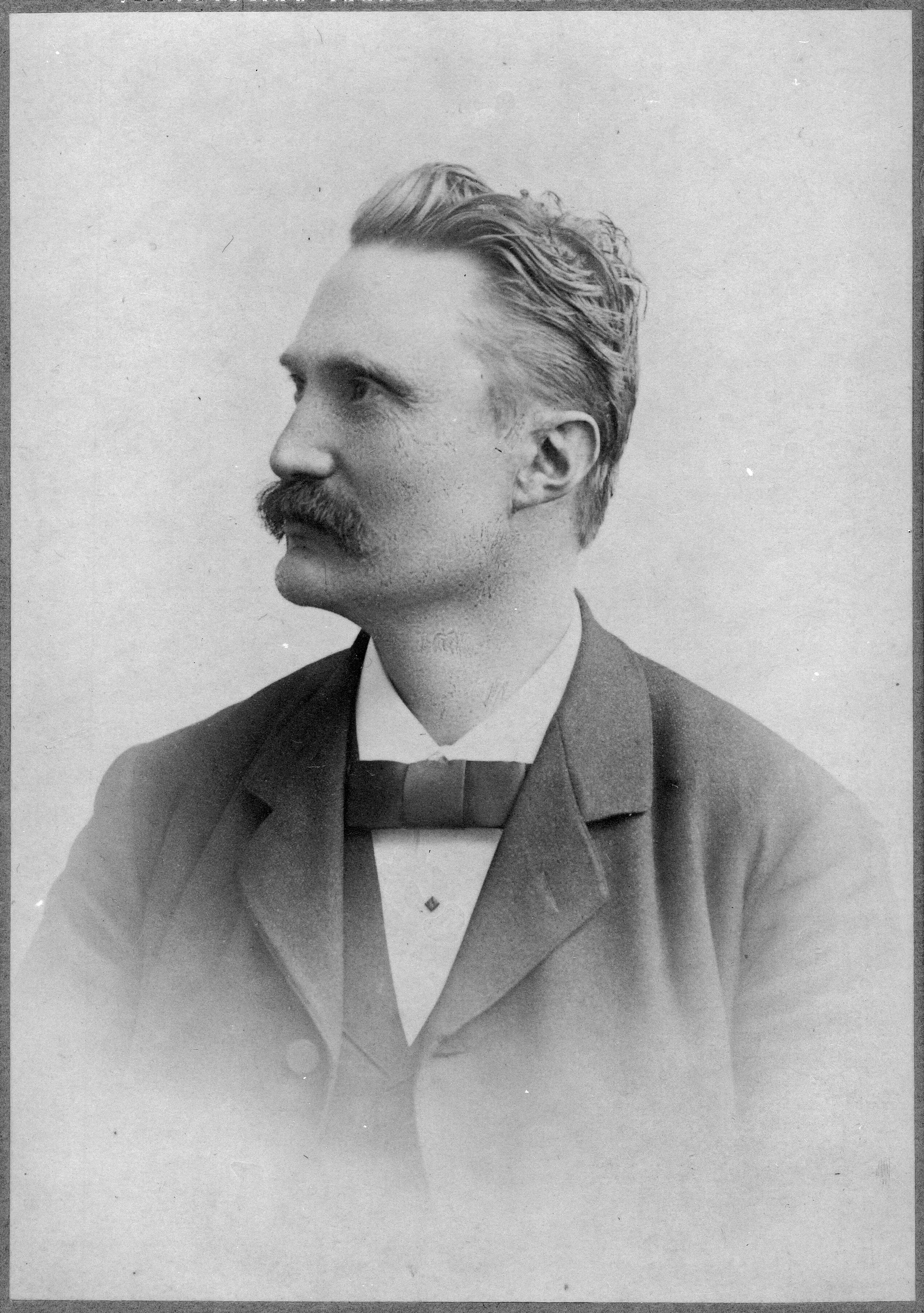
- Liebe circa 1915–1920

Prime Minister of Denmark
- In office 30 March 1920 – 5 April 1920
- Monarch: Christian X
- Preceded by: Carl Theodor Zahle
- Succeeded by: Michael Pedersen Friis

Minister of Justice
- In office 30 March 1920 – 2 April 1920
- Prime Minister: Himself
- Preceded by: Carl Theodor Zahle
- Succeeded by: Kristian Sindballe

Personal details
- Born: 24 May 1860 Copenhagen, Denmark
- Died: 21 March 1929 (aged 68) Copenhagen, Denmark
- Party: Independent
- Education: University of Copenhagen

Carl Julius Otto Liebe (24 May 1860 – 21 March 1929) was a Danish jurist who served as Prime Minister of Denmark from 30 March 1920 to 5 April 1920. Liebe was appointed prime minister after King Christian X had dismissed Carl Theodor Zahle and his cabinet because of dissatisfaction with the amount of land ceded to Denmark in the Schleswig Plebiscite. This use of power by the king, which was based in the Danish constitution, led to the Easter Crisis of 1920, and Otto Liebe was replaced by Michael Pedersen Friis after 5 days. The incident also led to a revision of the Danish constitution later in 1920.

== Biography ==
Carl Julius Otto Liebe was born in Copenhagen. He was the son of Anna Sophy Pedersen and Carl Christian Vilhelm Liebe. His father was a prominent lawyer and politician. He graduated from Metropolitanskolen in 1877 and became cand.jur. from the University of Copenhagen in 1882. He was a Supreme Court Attorney 1885 and Supreme Court Attorney in 1889. From 1910 until 1919, he served as chairman of the Danish Bar Association. Liebe became Knight of the Order of the Dannebrog 1900, Dannebrogsmand 1906, Commander of the 2nd degree 1917 and of the 1st degree 1920. In 1927 he received the Grand Cross.

Political offices
Preceded by Carl Theodor Zahle	Prime Minister of Denmark; 30 March 1920 – 5 April 1920	Succeeded by Michael Pedersen Friis
Preceded by Carl Theodor Zahle	Justice Minister of Denmark; 30 March 1920 – 5 April 1920	Succeeded by Kristian Sindballe
