= Klaus Berntsen =

Danish politician

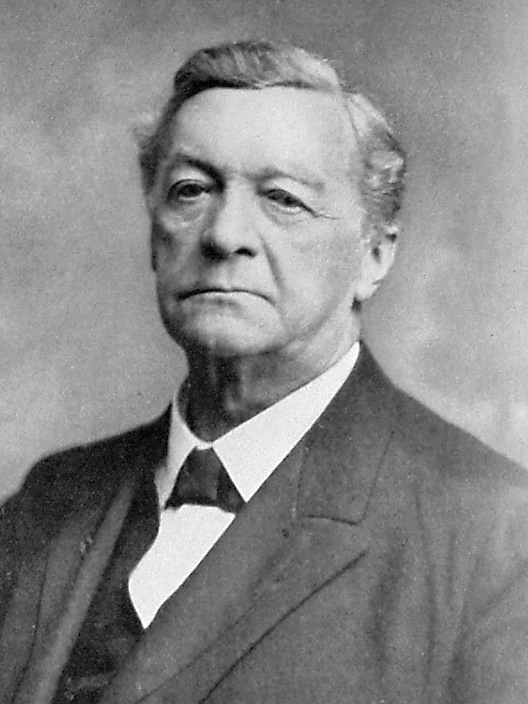

Council President of Denmark
- In office 5 July 1910 – 21 June 1913
- Monarchs: Frederik VIII; Christian X
- Preceded by: Carl Theodor Zahle
- Succeeded by: Carl Theodor Zahle

Minister of Defence
- In office 5 May 1920 – 9 October 1922
- Prime Minister: Niels Neergaard
- Preceded by: Michael Petersen Friis
- Succeeded by: Søren Brorsen
- In office 5 July 1910 – 21 June 1913
- Prime Minister: Himself
- Preceded by: Christopher Krabbe
- Succeeded by: Peter Rochegune Munch

Minister of the Interior
- In office 12 October 1908 – 28 October 1909
- Prime Minister: Niels Neergaard; Ludvig Holstein-Holsteinborg
- Preceded by: Sigurd Berg
- Succeeded by: Peter Rochegune Munch

Personal details
- Born: 12 June 1844 Eskildstrup, Denmark
- Died: 27 March 1927 (aged 82) Copenhagen, Denmark
- Party: Venstre

Klaus Berntsen (12 June 1844 – 27 March 1927) was a Danish politician, representing the Liberal party, Venstre. He was Council President of Denmark from 1910 to 1913. He served as minister of defence from 1910 to 1913 and again from 1920 to 1922. He was also minister of the interior from 1908 to 1909.

== Biography ==
He was born on 12 June 1844. He was the father of Aage Berntsen and Oluf Berntsen.

Very early he took part in politics as a quick-witted and popular agitator but belonging to the Moderate Venstre he was for many years without much political influence. After the beginning reunion of the old Venstre groups he played a greater role as a minister that led to the forming of his own cabinet. He was a personal friend of King Frederik VIII and enjoyed the king's support but his government was accused of lacking social understanding. 1913 he proposed the revision of the Constitution that was carried through by the second Zahle Cabinet. When he retired from politics in 1926 he was one of the oldest Danish active parliamentarian politicians ever.

As a member of the Folketing 1873-1884 and again 1886-1926 he remains the longest-serving member of the Danish Parliament and the only member for over 50 years.

He died on 27 March 1927.

Political offices
Preceded by Sigurd Berg	Interior Minister of Denmark; 12 October 1908 – 28 October 1909	Succeeded by Peter Rochegune Munch
Preceded by Carl Theodor Zahle	Council President of Denmark; 5 July 1910 – 21 June 1913	Succeeded by Carl Theodor Zahle
Preceded by Christopher Krabbe	Defence Minister of Denmark; 5 July 1910 – 21 June 1913	Succeeded by Peter Rochegune Munch
Preceded by Michael Pedersen Friis	Defence Minister of Denmark; 5 May 1920 – 9 October 1922	Succeeded by Søren Brorsen
