= Christian X =

King of Denmark (1912–1947) and Iceland (1918–1944)

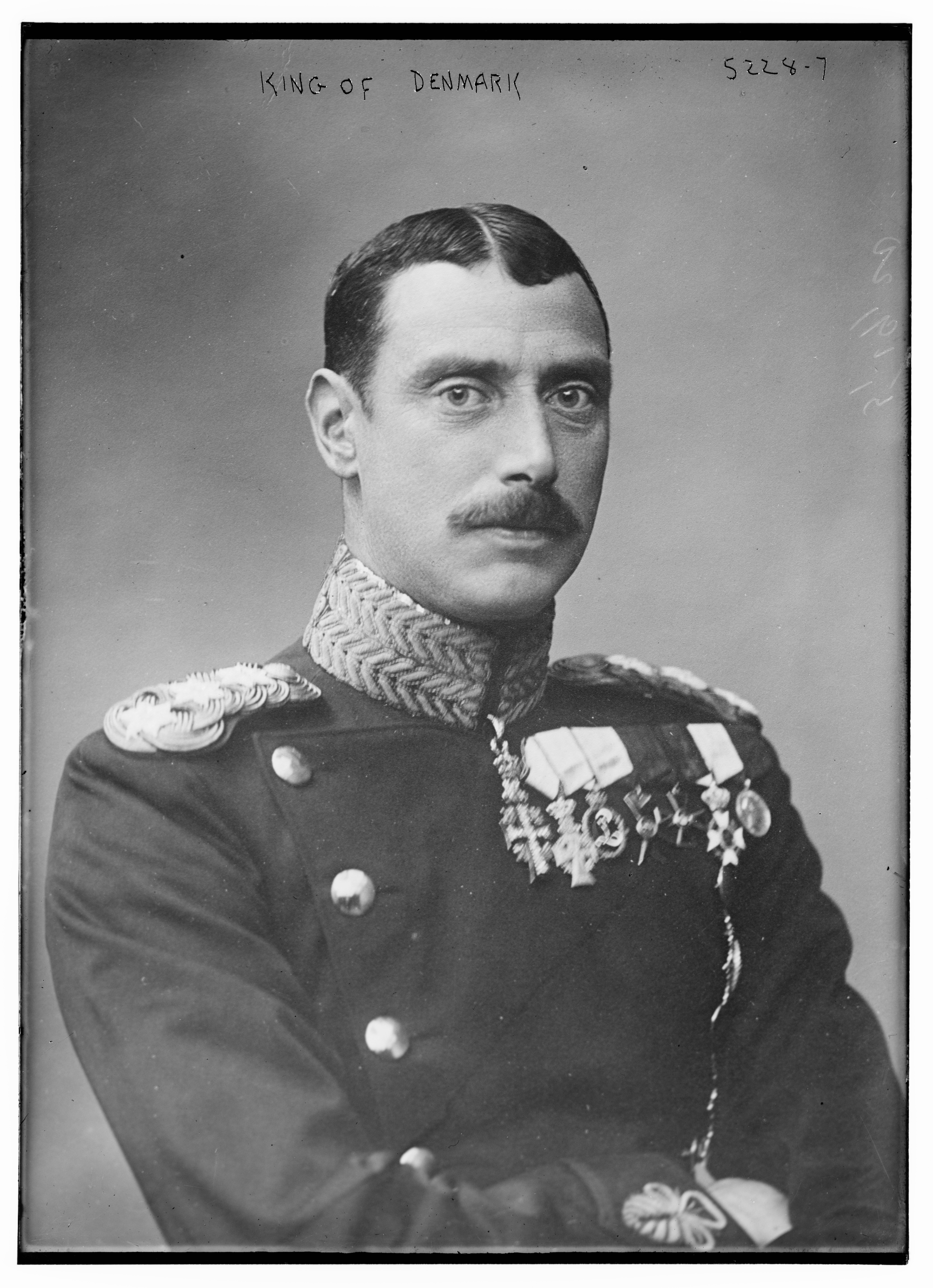
- Official portrait, c. 1915

King of Denmark
- Reign: 14 May 1912 – 20 April 1947
- Predecessor: Frederik VIII
- Successor: Frederik IX

King of Iceland
- Reign: 1 December 1918 – 17 June 1944
- Predecessor: Title created
- Successor: Monarchy abolished (Sveinn Björnsson as President)
- Regent: Sveinn Björnsson (1941–1944)
- Born: 26 September 1870; Charlottenlund Palace, Copenhagen, Denmark
- Died: 20 April 1947 (aged 76); Amalienborg Palace, Copenhagen, Denmark
- Burial: Roskilde Cathedral, Roskilde, Denmark
- Spouse: Alexandrine of Mecklenburg-Schwerin (m. 1898)
- Issue: Frederik IX; Knud, Hereditary Prince of Denmark
Names
- Christian Carl Frederik Albert Alexander Vilhelm
- House: Glücksburg
- Father: Frederik VIII
- Mother: Louise of Sweden

Christian X (Danish: Christian Carl Frederik Albert Alexander Vilhelm; 26 September 1870 – 20 April 1947) was King of Denmark from 1912 until his death in 1947, and the only King of Iceland as Kristján X, holding the title as a result of the personal union between Denmark and independent Iceland between 1918 and 1944.

He was a member of the House of Glücksburg, a branch of the House of Oldenburg, and the first monarch since King Frederik VII born into the Danish royal family; both his father and his grandfather were born as princes of a ducal family from Schleswig. Among his siblings was King Haakon VII of Norway. His son became King Frederik IX of Denmark. Among his cousins were King George V of the United Kingdom, Emperor Nicholas II of Russia, and King Constantine I of Greece, while Queen Maud of Norway, was both his cousin and sister-in-law.

His character has been described as authoritarian and he strongly stressed the importance of royal dignity and power. His reluctance to fully embrace democracy resulted in the Easter Crisis of 1920, in which he dismissed the democratically elected Social Liberal cabinet with which he disagreed, and installed one of his own choosing. This was in accordance with the letter of the constitution, but the principle of parliamentarianism had been considered a constitutional custom since 1901. Faced with mass demonstrations, a general strike organized by the Social Democrats, and the risk of the monarchy being overthrown, he was forced to accept that a monarch could not keep a government in office against the will of parliament as well as his reduced role as a symbolic head of state.

During the German occupation of Denmark, Christian became a popular symbol of resistance, particularly because of the symbolic value of the fact that he rode every day through the streets of Copenhagen unaccompanied by guards. With a reign spanning two world wars, and his role as a rallying symbol for Danish national sentiment during the German occupation, he became one of the most popular Danish monarchs of modern times. In Iceland however, the Danish government's capitulation to the Germans was seen as an abandonment of the agreed defensive relationship that the Danish crown was to hold over the island. As head of state, Christian became deeply unpopular in Iceland, contributing to the country's redesignation as the modern Republic of Iceland.

== Early life ==
=== Birth ===
Christian was born on 26 September 1870 at his parents' country residence, the Charlottenlund Palace, located on the shores of the Øresund Strait 10 kilometers north of Copenhagen on the island of Zealand in Denmark, during the reign of his paternal grandfather, King Christian IX. He was the first child of Crown Prince Frederick of Denmark and his wife Louise of Sweden. His father was the eldest son of King Christian IX of Denmark and Louise of Hesse-Kassel, and his mother was the only daughter of King Charles XV of Sweden and Norway and Louise of the Netherlands. The Danish author Hans Christian Andersen wrote the next day in his diary: "The night before 12 a Prince was born by the Crown Princess, the whole city flagged today in the beautiful weather." He was baptised with the names Christian Carl Frederik Albert Alexander Vilhelm in the chapel of Christiansborg Palace on 31 October 1870 by the Bishop of Zealand, Hans Lassen Martensen. The royal christening gown, which has been used for the baptism of almost all royal children in Denmark ever since, was used for the first time at his christening. This gown is made of Brussels lace, and was bought by Crown Princess Louise in Belgium for her eldest son's christening.

Prince Christian was raised with his siblings in the royal household in Copenhagen, and grew up between his parents' residence in Copenhagen, the Frederick VIII's Palace, an 18th-century palace which forms part of the Amalienborg Palace complex in central Copenhagen, and their country residence, the Charlottenlund Palace, located by the coastline of the Øresund strait north of the city. As a grandchild of the reigning Danish monarch in the male line and the eldest son of the Crown Prince, he was second in line to the throne, after his father. In contrast to the usual practise of the period, where royal children were brought up by governesses, the children were raised by Crown Princess Louise herself. Under the supervision of their mother, the children of the Crown Princess received a rather strict Christian-dominated upbringing, which was characterized by severity, the fulfillment of duties, care and order. Prince Christian was less than two years older than his brother Prince Carl, and the two princes had a joint confirmation at the chapel of Christiansborg Palace in 1887. The two princes were educated at home by private tutors. In 1889 Prince Christian passed the examen artium (the university entrance examination in Denmark) in 1889 as the first member of the Danish royal family. Afterwards he started a military education as was customary for princes at that time. He subsequently served with the 5th Dragoon Regiment and later studied at the Officers Academy in Randers from 1891 to 1892.

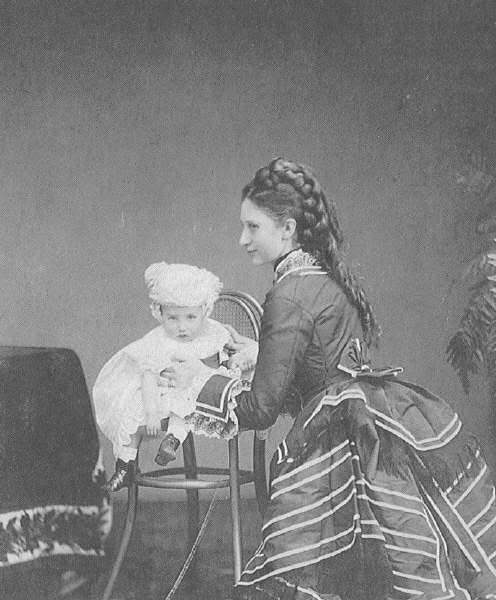
Crown Princess Louise with her eldest child, early 1870s

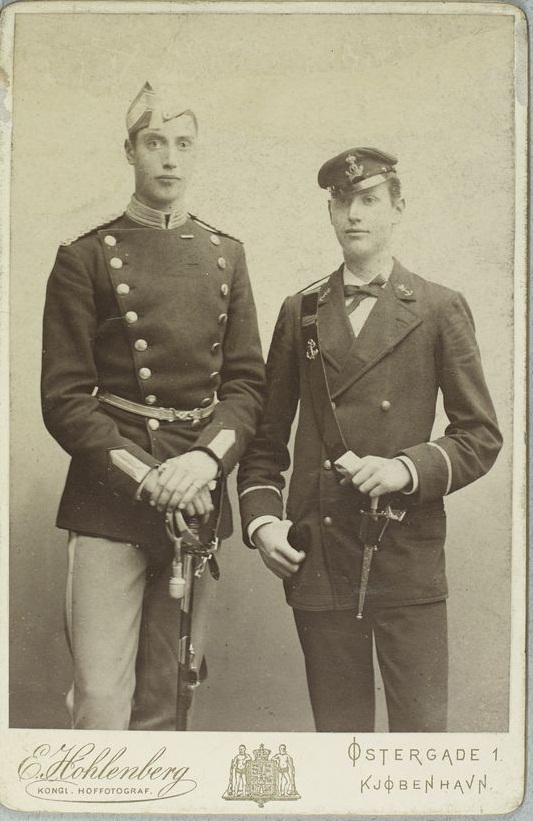
Prince Christian with his younger brother, the then Prince Carl in 1887

=== Marriage ===
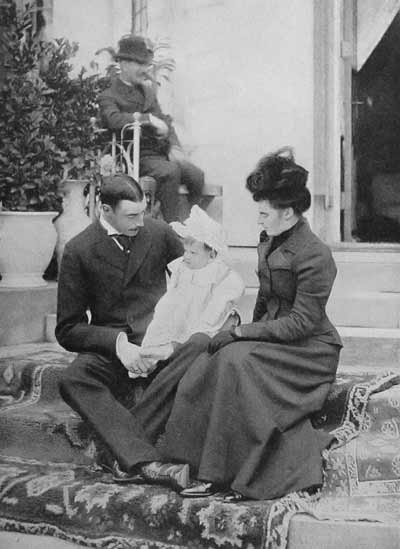
Prince Christian and Princess Alexandrine with their son Frederik in 1900

As a young man, Prince Christian fell in love with the French Princess Marguerite of Orléans, who was the younger sister of his uncle Prince Valdemar's wife Princess Marie of Orléans. The feelings, however, were not reciprocated, and after a few years of unhappy infatuation, she married in 1896 Marie Armand Patrice de Mac Mahon, 2nd Duke of Magenta, son of the French Marshal and President Patrice de MacMahon.

During a stay in Cannes in March 1897, Christian met and fell in love with Duchess Alexandrine of Mecklenburg-Schwerin; she was a daughter of Frederick Francis III, Grand Duke of Mecklenburg-Schwerin, and Grand Duchess Anastasia Mikhailovna of Russia. They were engaged in Schwerin on 24 March 1897 and married in Cannes on 26 April 1898. She eventually became his queen consort. They had two sons:

- Prince Frederik (1899–1972), later King Frederick IX of Denmark
- Prince Knud (1900–1976), later Knud, Hereditary Prince of Denmark

The couple were given Christian VIII's Palace at Amalienborg Palace in Copenhagen as their residence and Sorgenfri Palace north of Copenhagen as a summer residence. Furthermore, the couple received Marselisborg Palace in Aarhus as a wedding present from the people of Denmark in 1898. In 1914, the King also built the villa Klitgården in Skagen.

=== Crown Prince ===
On 29 January 1906, King Christian IX died, and Christian's father ascended the throne as King Frederick VIII. Christian himself became crown prince.

== Reign ==
=== Accession ===
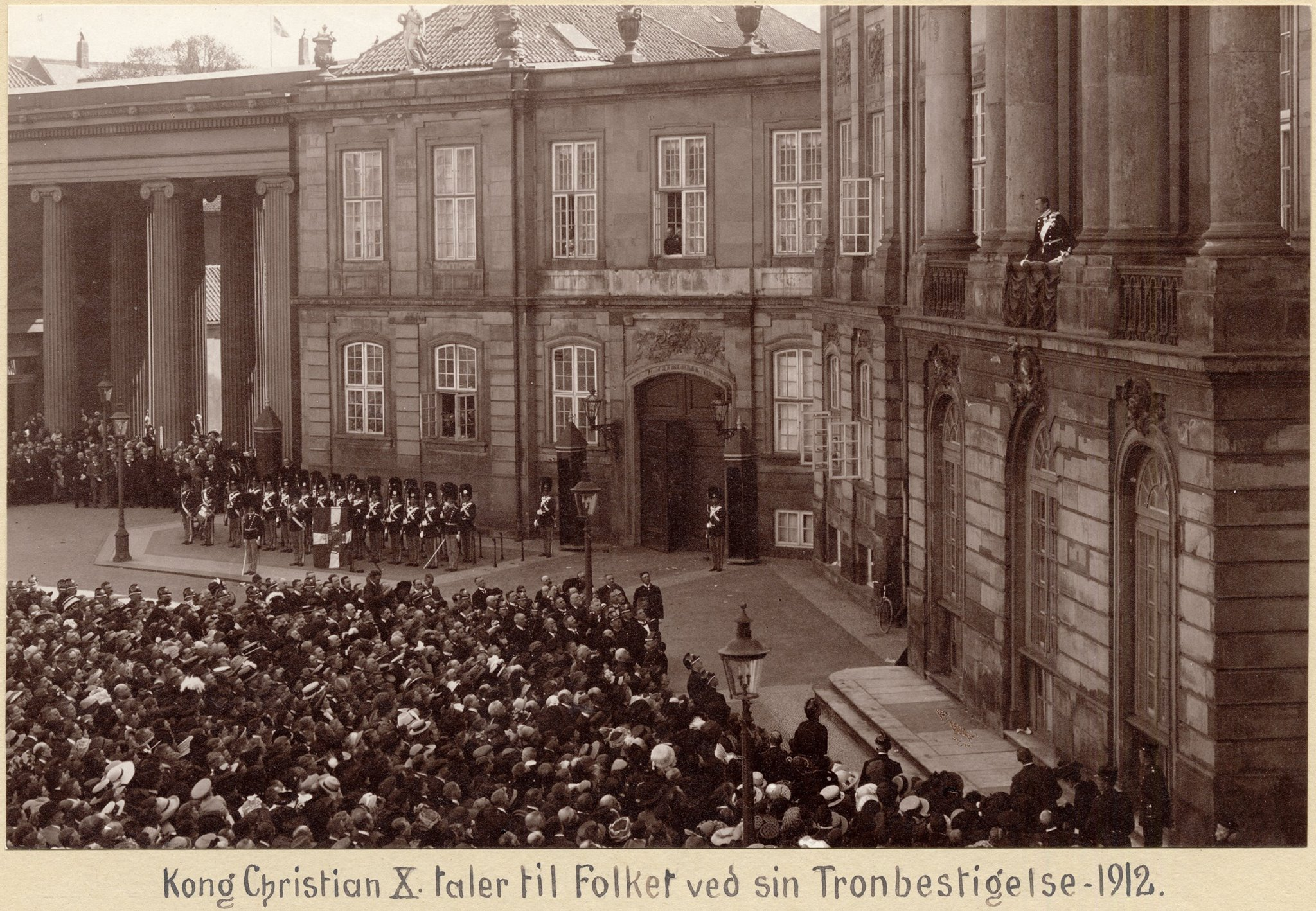
Christian X addressing the people at his Accession to the throne in 1912.

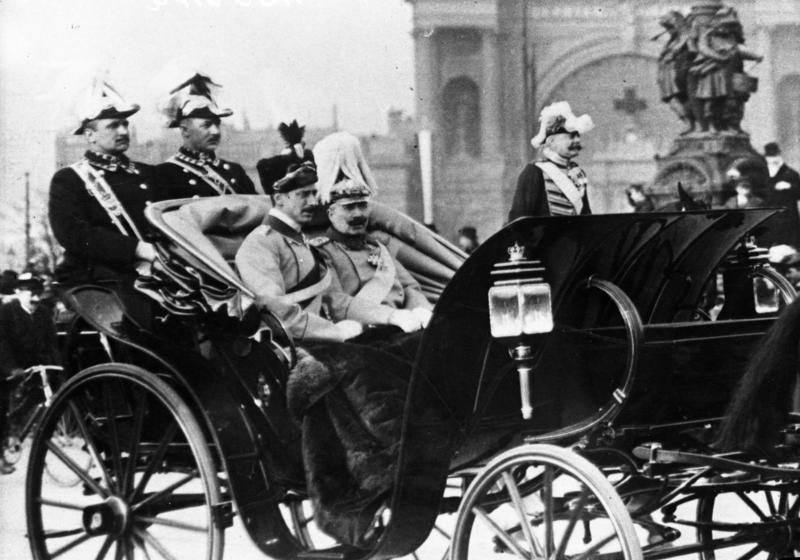
King Christian and the German Emperor during a visit to Berlin in 1913

On 14 May 1912, King Frederick VIII died at the age of 68 after collapsing during an evening walk in Hamburg, Germany. He had just returned from a recuperation stay in Nice, France, and was staying in Germany before continuing to Copenhagen. Christian, who was in Copenhagen when he heard about his father's demise, succeeded to the throne at the age of 41. He was proclaimed king from the balcony of Christian VII's Palace at Amalienborg by the Prime Minister Klaus Berntsen as King Christian X.

=== World War I ===
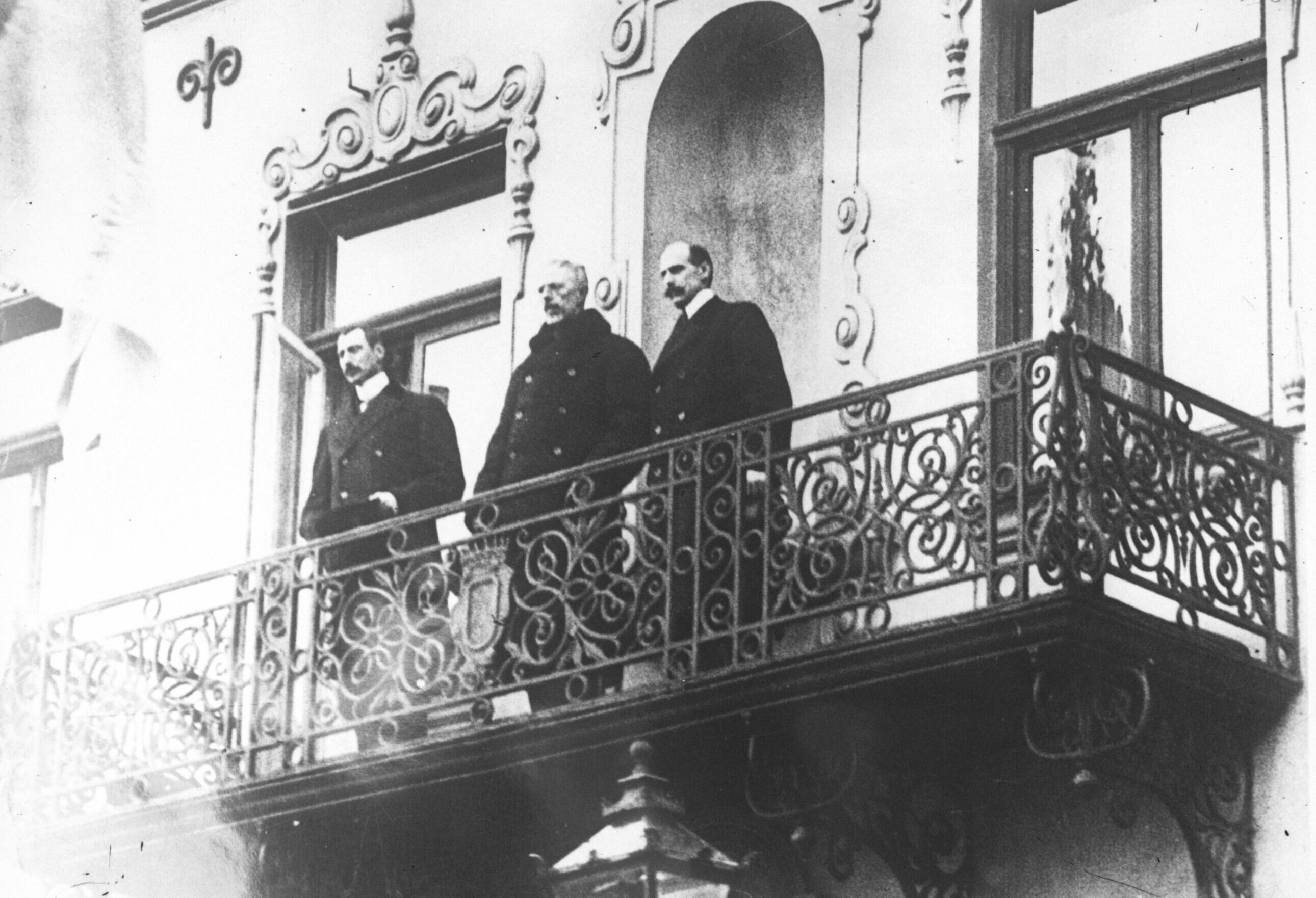
Christian X of Denmark, Gustav V of Sweden and Haakon VII of Norway at the meeting of the three Scandinavian kings in Malmö in December 1914.

At the start of the First World War in 1914, King Christian and the Danish government advocated that Denmark pursue a policy of neutrality. The King supported the policy of neutrality by participating in the so-called meeting of the Three Kings held on 18 December 1914 in Malmö in Sweden. There, the three Scandinavian monarchs King Christian X of Denmark, King Haakon VII of Norway (Christian's brother) and King Gustav V of Sweden (Christian's mother's cousin) met along with their foreign ministers to discuss and emphasize the neutrality of the Nordic countries, and in a joint declaration, confirmed the three states' strict neutrality during the war. The meeting in 1914 was followed by another three-kings meeting in Kristiania in November 1917.

Denmark in fact managed to maintain its neutrality during the war. However, the Danish government bowed to pressure from Germany, and had naval mines laid in Danish waters with tacit British acceptance, despite the fact that Denmark was obliged under international law to keep its territorial waters open.

In 1915, the Constitution of Denmark was changed to introduce universal suffrage, and women were given the right to vote along with domestic servants. Although the king was reluctant to the constitutional changes, the Danish Women's Society organized a procession with approximately 20,000 participants who went to Amalienborg to thank the king. In his address to the procession, the king stated, among other things:

In one place, women cannot be dispensed with, and that is in the homes. Here, the influence of women cannot be replaced, because through the child's love for the home, the one for our common home, Denmark, is awakened.

=== Easter Crisis of 1920 ===
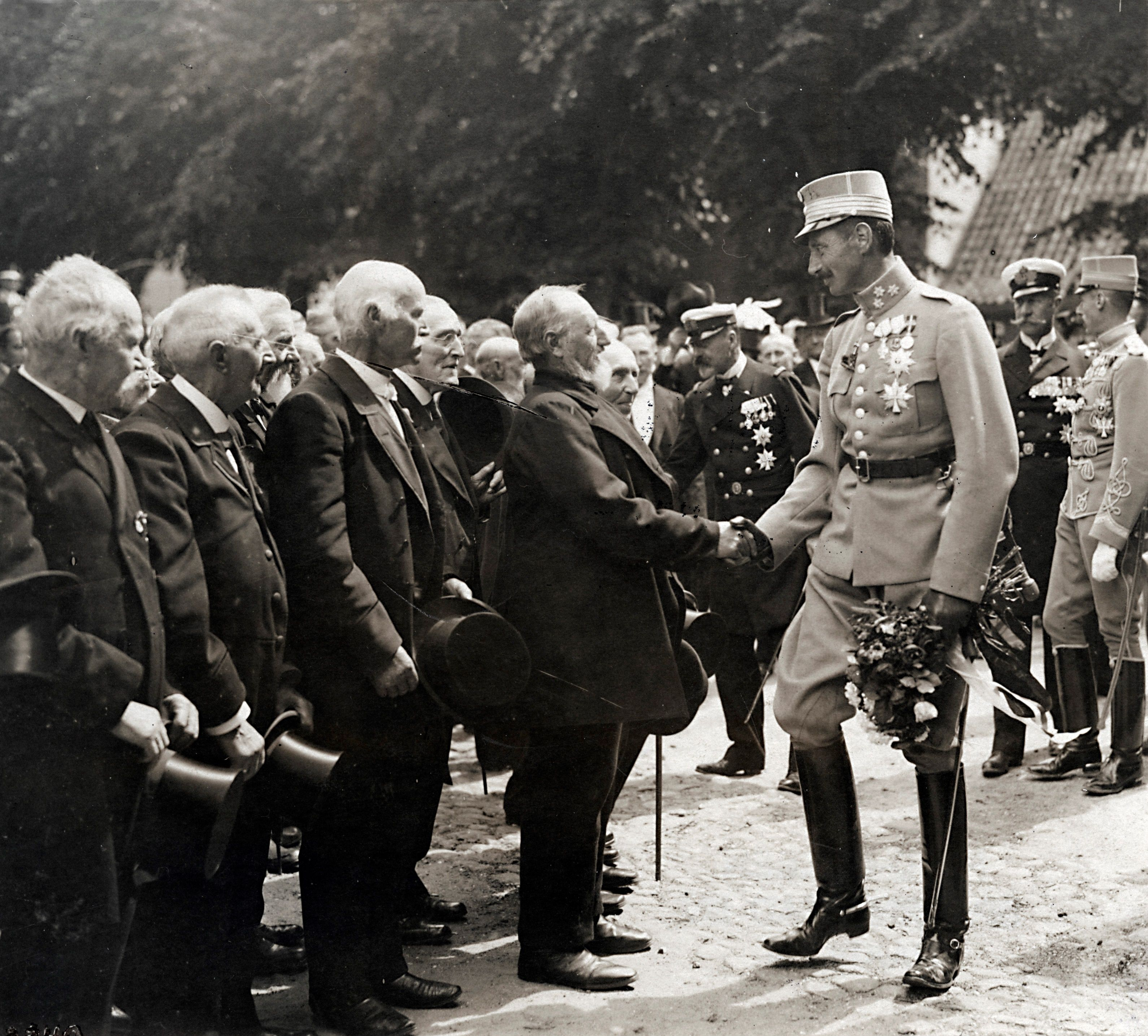
Christian X greeting Danish veterans of the Second Schleswig War in Christiansfeld, July 1920, following the reunification of Northern Schleswig with Denmark

In April 1920, Christian instigated the Easter Crisis, perhaps the most decisive event in the evolution of the Danish monarchy in the twentieth century. The immediate cause was a conflict between the King and the cabinet over the reunification with Denmark of Schleswig, a former Danish fiefdom, which had been lost to Prussia during the Second War of Schleswig. Danish claims to the region persisted to the end of World War I, at which time the defeat of the Germans made it possible to resolve the dispute. According to the terms of the Treaty of Versailles, the disposition of Schleswig was to be determined by two plebiscites: one in Northern Schleswig (Denmark's South Jutland County 1971–2006), the other in Central Schleswig (today part of the German state of Schleswig-Holstein). No plebiscite was planned for Southern Schleswig, as it was dominated by an ethnic German majority and, in accordance with prevailing sentiment of the times, remained part of the post-war German state.

In Northern Schleswig, seventy-five percent voted for reunification with Denmark and twenty-five percent for remaining with Germany. In this vote, the entire region was considered to be an indivisible unit, and the entire region was awarded to Denmark. In Central Schleswig, the situation was reversed with eighty percent voting for Germany and twenty percent for Denmark. In this vote, each municipality decided its own future, and German majorities prevailed everywhere. In light of these results, the government of Prime Minister Carl Theodor Zahle determined that reunification with Northern Schleswig could go forward, while Central Schleswig would remain under German control.

Many Danish nationalists felt that at least the city of Flensburg, in Central Schleswig, should be returned to Denmark regardless of the plebiscite's results, due to the sizeable Danish minority there and a general desire to see Germany permanently weakened in the future. Christian X agreed with these sentiments, and ordered Prime Minister Zahle to include Flensburg in the re-unification process. As Denmark had been operating as a parliamentary democracy since the Cabinet of Deuntzer in 1901, Zahle felt he was under no obligation to comply. He refused the order and resigned several days later after a heated exchange with the King.

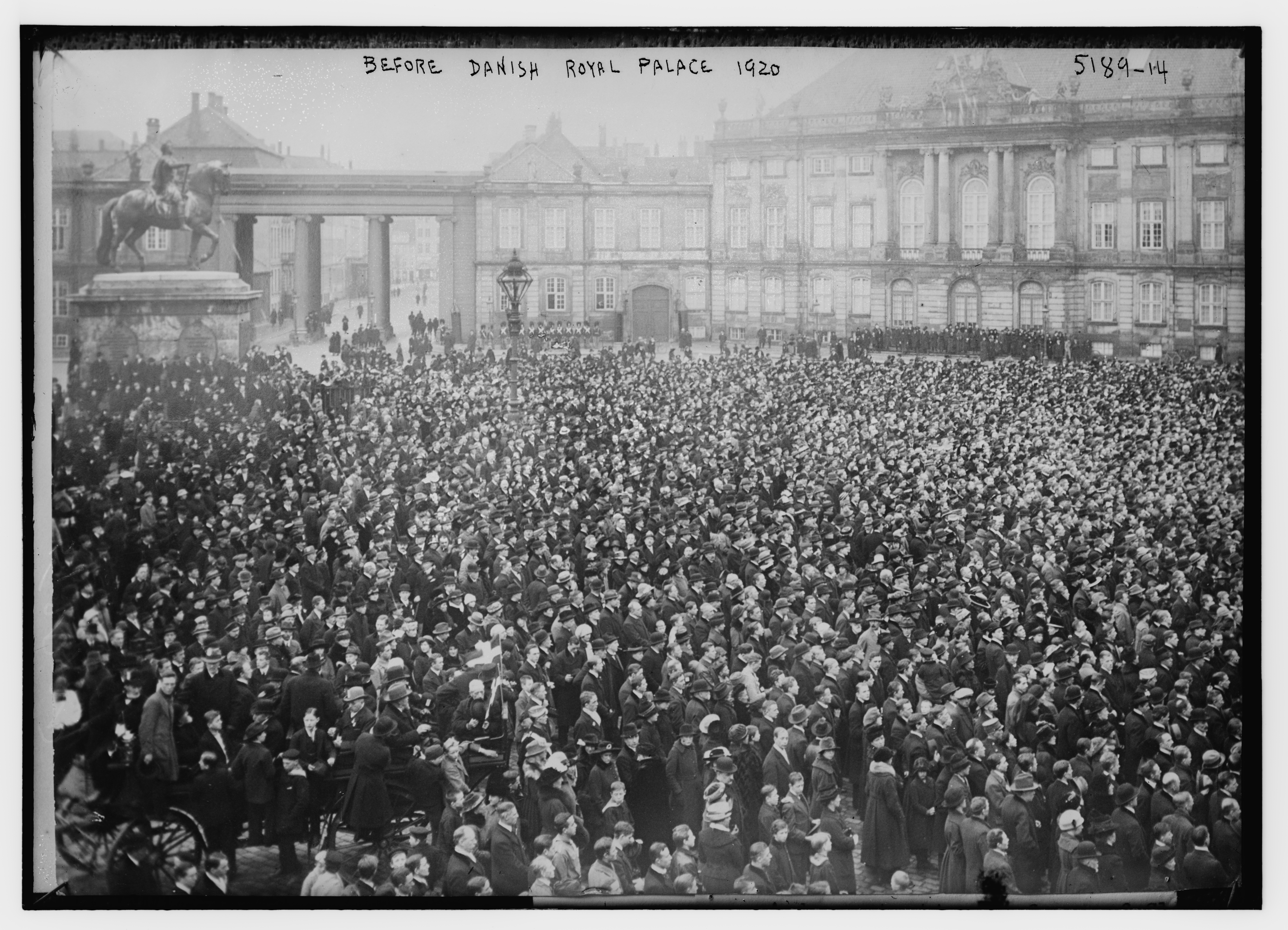
Demonstrations against the king at Amalienborg Square in 1920

Subsequently, Christian X dismissed the rest of the cabinet and replaced it with a de facto conservative caretaker cabinet. The dismissal caused demonstrations and an almost revolutionary atmosphere in Denmark, and for several days the future of the monarchy seemed very much in doubt. In light of this, negotiations were opened between the King and members of the Social Democrats. Faced with the potential overthrow of the Danish Crown, Christian X stood down and dismissed his own government, installing a compromise cabinet until elections could be held later that year.

To date, this is the last time a reigning Danish monarch has attempted to take political action without the full support of parliament. Following the crisis, Christian X bowed fully to his drastically reduced status, and spent the last quarter-century of his rule as a model constitutional monarch.

=== World War II ===
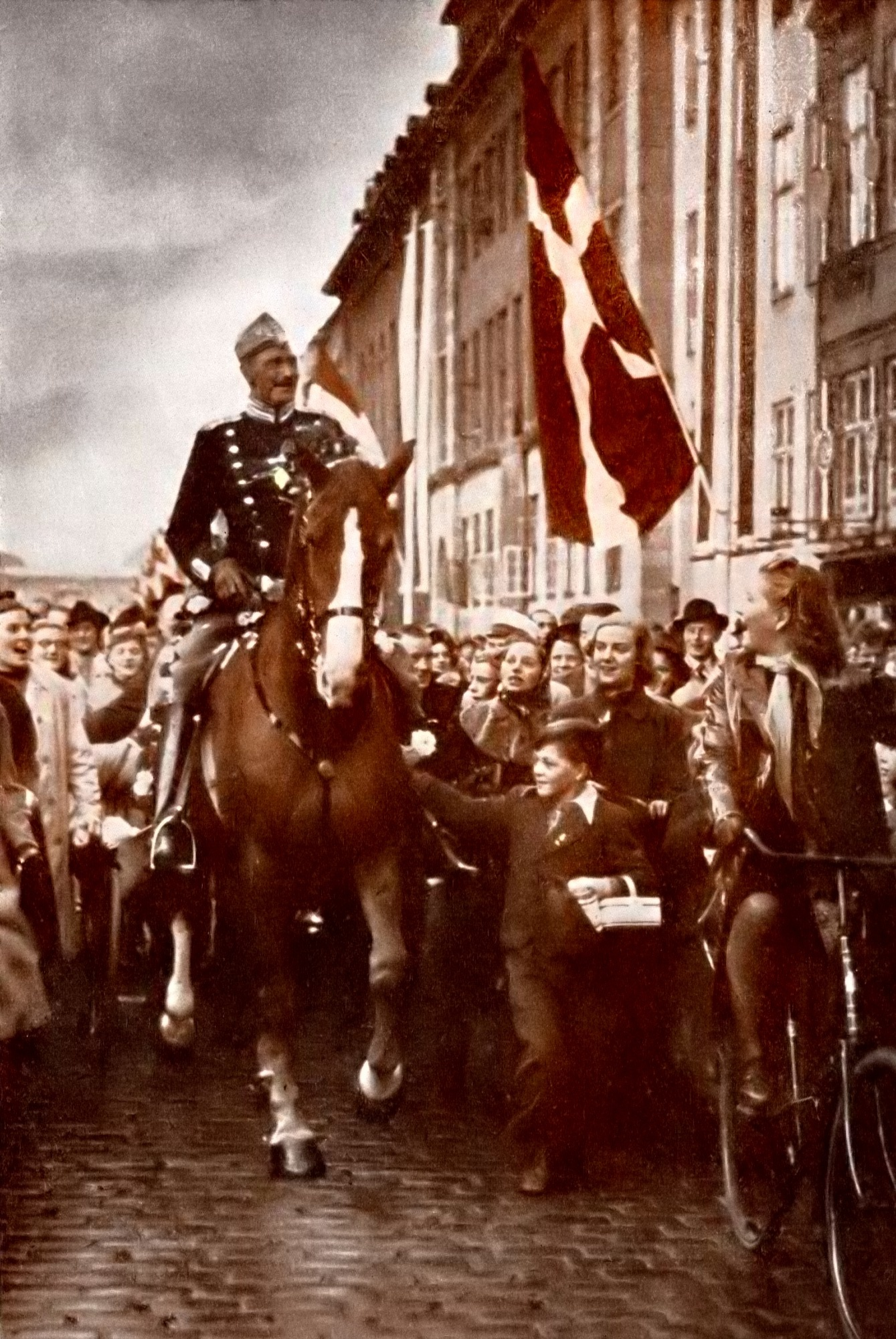
During the German occupation of Denmark, the King's daily ride through Copenhagen became a symbol of Danish sovereignty. This picture was taken on his birthday in 1940

On 9 April 1940 at 4 am Nazi Germany invaded Denmark in a surprise attack, overwhelming Denmark's Army and Navy and destroying the Danish Army Air Corps. Christian X quickly realized that Denmark was in an impossible position. Its territory and population were far too small to hold out against Germany for any sustained period of time. Its flat land would have resulted in it being easily overrun by German panzers; Jutland, for instance, would have been overrun in short order by a panzer attack from Schleswig-Holstein immediately to the south. Unlike its Nordic neighbours, Denmark had no mountain ranges from which a drawn-out resistance could be mounted against the German army. With no prospect of being able to hold out for any length of time, and faced with the explicit threat of the Luftwaffe bombing the civilian population of Copenhagen, and with only one general in favour of continuing to fight, Christian X and the entire Danish government capitulated at about 6 am, in exchange for retaining political independence in domestic matters, beginning the occupation of Denmark, which lasted until 5 May 1945.

In contrast to his brother King Haakon VII of Norway and Queen Wilhelmina of the Netherlands, King George II of Greece, Grand Duchess Charlotte of Luxembourg, King Peter II of Yugoslavia and President Władysław Raczkiewicz of Poland, all of whom went into exile during the Nazi occupation of their countries, Christian X (like King Leopold III of the Belgians, unlike President Albert Lebrun of France who was deposed) remained in his capital throughout the occupation of Denmark, being to the Danish people a visible symbol of the national cause (Haakon escaped the German advance after refusing to accept a Nazi-friendly puppet regime).

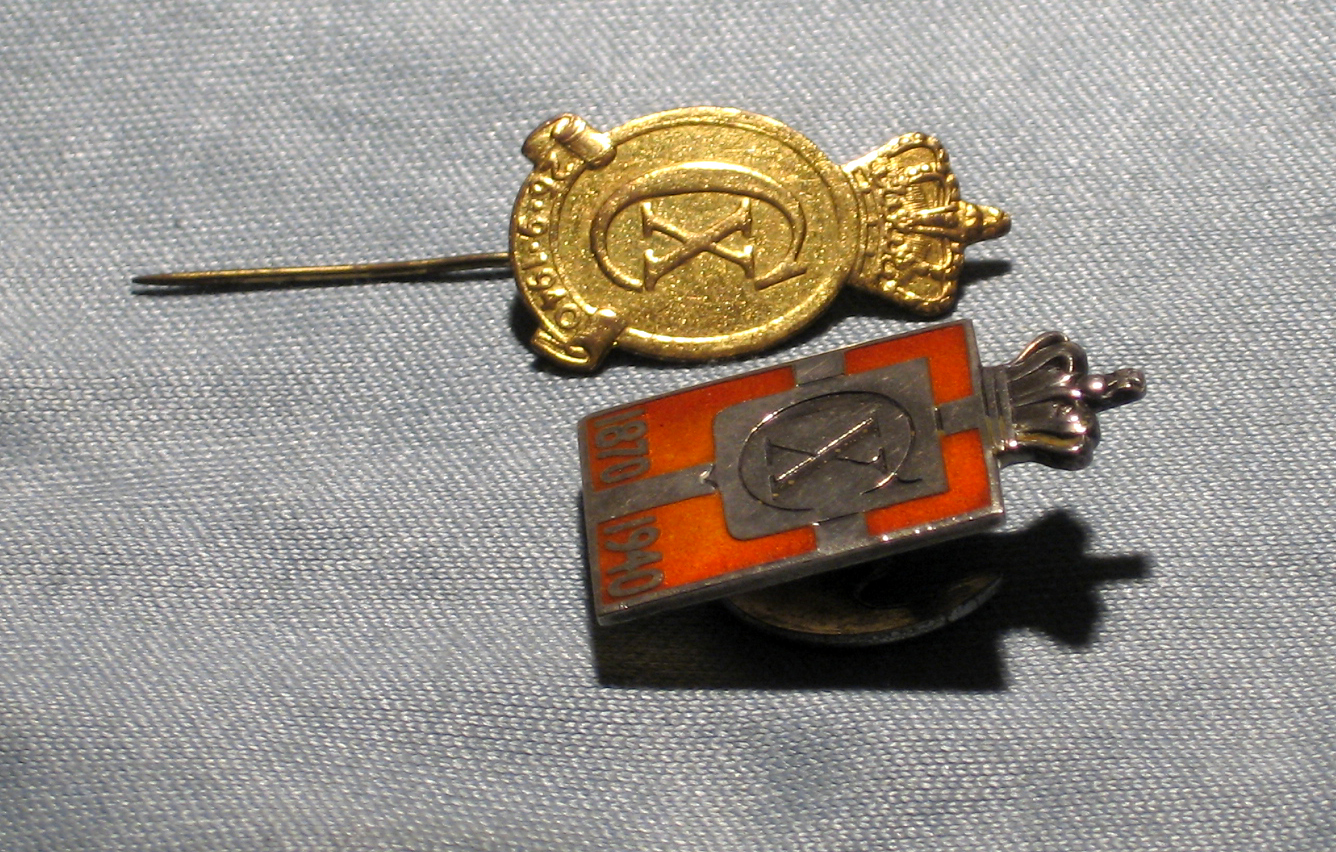
Two versions of the King's Emblem Pin (Kongemærket), showing Christian's CX cypher; a popular symbol of patriotism during the war

Until the imposition of martial law by Germany in August 1943, Christian's official speeches reflected the government's official policy of cooperation with the occupying forces, but this did not prevent his being seen by the Danish people as a man of "mental resistance." During the first two years of the German occupation, despite his age and the precarious situation, he took a daily ride on his horse, Jubilee, through Copenhagen, unaccompanied by a groom, let alone a guard. A popular way for Danes to display patriotism and silent resistance to the German occupation was wearing a small square button with the Danish flag and the crowned insignia of the king. This symbol was called the Kongemærket (King's Emblem pin). In addition, he helped finance the transport of Danish Jews to unoccupied Sweden, where they would be safe from Nazi persecution.

In 1942, Adolf Hitler sent Christian a long telegram congratulating him on his seventy-second birthday. The king's reply telegram was a mere, Spreche Meinen besten Dank aus. Chr. Rex (Giving my best thanks, King Christian). This perceived slight, known as the Telegram Crisis, greatly outraged Hitler and he immediately recalled his ambassador from Copenhagen and expelled the Danish ambassador from Germany. German pressure then resulted in the dismissal of the government led by Vilhelm Buhl and its replacement with a new cabinet led by non-party member and veteran diplomat Erik Scavenius, whom the Germans expected to be more cooperative. (In any event, whatever independence Denmark had been able to maintain during the first years of the occupation ended abruptly with the German Putsch in August 1943.) After a fall with his horse on 19 October 1942, Christian was more or less an invalid for the rest of his reign. The role he played in creating the Easter Crisis of 1920 had greatly reduced his popularity, but his daily rides, the Telegram Crisis, and the admiring stories spread by Danish-American circles once again made him popular to the point of being a beloved national symbol.

=== Reign over Iceland ===
Royal Standard of Kristján X as King of Iceland

The accession of a new Danish–Icelandic Act of Union in late 1918 redefined Iceland, a longtime part of the Danish realm, as a sovereign state in a personal union with the Kingdom of Denmark. This made Christian the king of the mostly autonomous Kingdom of Iceland in addition to being King of Denmark. Christian (whose name in Iceland was officially Kristján X) was the first and only monarch to ever reign over Iceland as a sovereign kingdom as opposed to ruling it as a province of a larger kingdom. In 1941, after the German occupation of Denmark and the Allied occupation of Iceland, the Icelandic government concluded that Christian was unable to perform his duties as head of state of Iceland, and thus appointed Sveinn Björnsson as regent to act as provisional head of state. Sveinn had previously been Iceland's ambassador in Copenhagen.

In 1944, while Denmark was still under German occupation, Icelanders voted in a plebiscite to sever all ties with the King of Denmark and to found a republic. Thus, Christian's title as King of Iceland became null and void and Sveinn Björnsson was elected the first President of Iceland by the Icelandic parliament. Christian, who believed that Sveinn had given him assurances that Iceland would not make further moves toward independence while the occupation was ongoing, felt quite badly betrayed. However, at the urging of his relative, the King of Sweden, Christian still accepted the outcome and sent a message of congratulations to Iceland during the celebration of the founding of the Republic on 17 June 1944. The reading of the King's letter provoked cheers at Þingvellir during the celebration. Despite this implicit acceptance of Iceland's independence, Christian never actually stopped using the title "King of Iceland", and continued including it in his regnal name until his death in 1947.

=== Death ===
Christian X died at the Amalienborg Palace in Copenhagen, on 20 April 1947, at the age of 76. Christian X was interred along with other members of the Danish royal family in Roskilde Cathedral near Copenhagen. A cloth armband of the type worn by members of the Danish resistance movement was placed on his coffin under a castrum doloris.

== Legends ==
On 22 November 1942, The Washington Post published a photograph of Christian X, facetiously calling him a victim of Hitler, and stated that the nation of this monarch did not oppose German occupation with arms. It then became important for Danish Americans to prove the contrary, and a number of stories were invented in the turmoil of the war. The most successful of these was the legend of the King wearing the yellow star to support the Jews.

King Christian used to ride daily through the streets of Copenhagen unaccompanied while the people stood and waved to him. One apocryphal story relates that one day, a German soldier remarked to a young boy that he found it odd that the King would ride with no bodyguard. The boy reportedly replied, "All of Denmark is his bodyguard." This story was recounted in Nathaniel Benchley's bestselling book Bright Candles as well as in Lois Lowry's book Number the Stars. The contemporary patriotic song "Der rider en Konge" ("There Rides a King") centers on the King's rides. In this song, the narrator replies to a foreigner's inquiry about the King's lack of a guard that "he is our freest man" and that the King is not shielded by physical force but that "hearts guard the king of Denmark."

Another popular, but apocryphal, legend carried by the American press concerned the supposed flying of the German flag over the Hotel d'Angleterre (then being used as the German military headquarters in Copenhagen). The King, riding by and seeing the flag, told a German sentry that it was a violation of the armistice agreement and that the flag must be taken down. The sentry replied that this would not be done. The King then said that if the flag was not taken down, he would send a Danish soldier to take it down. The sentry responded, "The soldier will be shot." The King replied, "the Danish soldier will be me." According to the story, the flag was taken down.

King Christian X became the hero of a number of myths about his defense of the Danish Jews. He became the subject of a persistent urban legend according to which, during Nazi occupation, Nazis forced the Jews to wear the Star of David and the king donned the Star of David himself as a symbol of solidarity with them. However, in Denmark, unlike other Nazi-controlled territories, Jews were never forced to wear the Star of David. The legend likely stems from a 1942 British report that claimed he threatened to don the star if this was forced upon Danish Jews, and was popularised when it was included in Leon Uris's best-selling novel Exodus.

It is true, however, that the King intended to wear the star in case the Danish Jews were forced to do so. In his personal diary, he wrote this entry: "When you look at the inhumane treatment of Jews, not only in Germany but occupied countries as well, you start worrying that such a demand might also be put on us, but we must clearly refuse such this due to their protection under the Danish constitution. I stated that I could not meet such a demand towards Danish citizens. If such a demand is made, we would best meet it by all wearing the Star of David."

The myth may originate from a Swedish newspaper cartoon, in which the King is asked what to do if Nazi-supported prime minister Erik Scavenius makes the Jews wear yellow stars. The King replied that in that case, all Danes would have to wear such stars.

== Titles, styles and honours ==
=== Titles and styles ===
Royal Monogram of King Christian X of Denmark

- 26 September 1870 – 29 January 1906: His Royal Highness Prince Christian of Denmark
- 29 January 1906 – 14 May 1912: His Royal Highness The Crown Prince of Denmark
- 14 May 1912 – 1 December 1918: His Majesty The King of Denmark
- 1 December 1918 – 17 June 1944: His Majesty The King of Denmark and Iceland
- 17 June 1944 – 20 April 1947: His Majesty The King of Denmark

=== Honours ===
King Christian X Land in Greenland is named after him.

Danish and Icelandic honours

- Knight of the Elephant, 26 September 1888
- Cross of Honour of the Order of the Dannebrog, 26 September 1888
- Commemorative Medal for the Golden Wedding of King Christian IX and Queen Louise
- Grand Commander of the Dannebrog, in Diamonds, 14 May 1912
- Founder and Grand Master of the Order of the Falcon, 3 July 1921 – 17 June 1944

Foreign honours

- Austria: Grand Star of the Decoration of Honour for Services to the Republic of Austria
- Belgium: Grand Cordon of the Order of Leopold, 22 July 1897
- Chile: Grand Cross of the Order of Merit, with Collar
- Colombia: Extraordinary Grand Cross of the Order of Boyacá
- Czechoslovakia: Collar of the White Lion, 1933
- Estonia: Cross of Liberty, Grade I Class I, 29 April 1925
- Finland: Collar of the White Rose, 1919
- France: Grand Cross of the Legion of Honour
- German Empire:
  - Knight of the Black Eagle, 29 June 1890; with Collar
  - Grand Cross of the Red Eagle
  - Bavaria: Knight of St. Hubert
  - Mecklenburg:
    - Cross of Honour of the Order of the Griffon
    - Grand Cross of the Wendish Crown, with Crown in Ore
  - Oldenburg: Grand Cross of the Order of Duke Peter Friedrich Ludwig, with Golden Crown
  - Saxe-Weimar-Eisenach: Grand Cross of the White Falcon, 1897
  - Schaumburg-Lippe: Cross of Honour of the House Order of Lippe, 1st Class
- Kingdom of Greece:
  - Grand Cross of the Redeemer
  - Grand Cross of Saints George and Constantine
- Regency Hungary: Grand Cross of the Order of Merit, with Holy Crown and Collar, 26 September 1940
- Kingdom of Italy: Knight of the Annunciation, 26 January 1910
- Iranian Empire: Collar of the Order of Pahlavi
- Empire of Japan: Collar of the Order of the Chrysanthemum
- Monaco: Grand Cross of St. Charles
- Netherlands: Grand Cross of the Netherlands Lion
- Norway:
  - Grand Cross of St. Olav, with Collar, 22 June 1906
  - Commemorative Medal for the Coronation of King Haakon VII and Queen Maud
  - King Haakon VII 1905–1930 Jubilee Medal
- Peru: Grand Cross of the Sun of Peru, in Diamonds
- Poland: Knight of the White Eagle, 1923
- Kingdom of Romania: Collar of the Order of Carol I, 1912
- Russian Empire:
  - Knight of St. Andrew
  - Knight of St. Alexander Nevsky
  - Knight of the White Eagle
  - Knight of St. Anna, 1st Class
  - Knight of St. Stanislaus, 1st Class
  - Knight of St. Vladimir, 4th Class
- Kingdom of Serbia: Grand Cross of the Star of Karađorđe
- (Thailand) Siam:
  - Knight of the Order of the Royal House of Chakri, 15 July 1897
  - Commemorative Medal for the Coronation of King Rama VII
- Spain:
  - Knight of the Golden Fleece, 4 July 1901
  - Grand Cross of the Order of Charles III, with Collar, 15 May 1902
- Sweden:
  - Knight of the Seraphim, with Collar, 15 November 1888
  - Knight of the Order of Charles XIII, 1912
  - Gold Medal for Commendable Deeds
- United Kingdom:
  - Honorary Grand Cross of the Royal Victorian Order, 11 October 1901
  - Honorary Grand Cross of the Bath (civil), 22 April 1908
  - Stranger Knight Companion of the Garter, 9 May 1914
  - Royal Victorian Chain
  - Bailiff Grand Cross of St. John
- Venezuela: Collar of the Order of the Liberator

Honorary military appointments

- 1912–1914: Colonel-in-Chief of the 14th (2nd Kurhessian) Hussars "Landgrave Frederick II of Hesse-Homburg"
- 1914–1947: Colonel-in-Chief of the Buffs (Royal East Kent Regiment)

== Issue ==
Name	Birth	Death	Spouse	Children
Frederik IX of Denmark	11 March 1899	14 January 1972	Princess Ingrid of Sweden	Margrethe II of Denmark; Benedikte, Dowager Princess of Sayn-Wittgenstein-Berleburg; Anne-Marie, Queen of the Hellenes
Knud, Hereditary Prince of Denmark	27 July 1900	14 June 1976	Princess Caroline-Mathilde of Denmark	Princess Elisabeth of Denmark; Count Ingolf of Rosenborg; Count Christian of Rosenborg

Christian X House of Schleswig-Holstein-Sonderburg-Glücksburg Cadet branch of the House of Oldenburg Born: 26 September 1870 Died: 20 April 1947
Regnal titles
Preceded by Frederik VIII	King of Denmark; 1912–1947	Succeeded by Frederik IX
New title Kingdom of Iceland created	King of Iceland; 1918–1944	Vacant Republic of Iceland created
