= Carl Theodor Zahle =

Prime Minister of Denmark (1909–1910; 1913–1920)

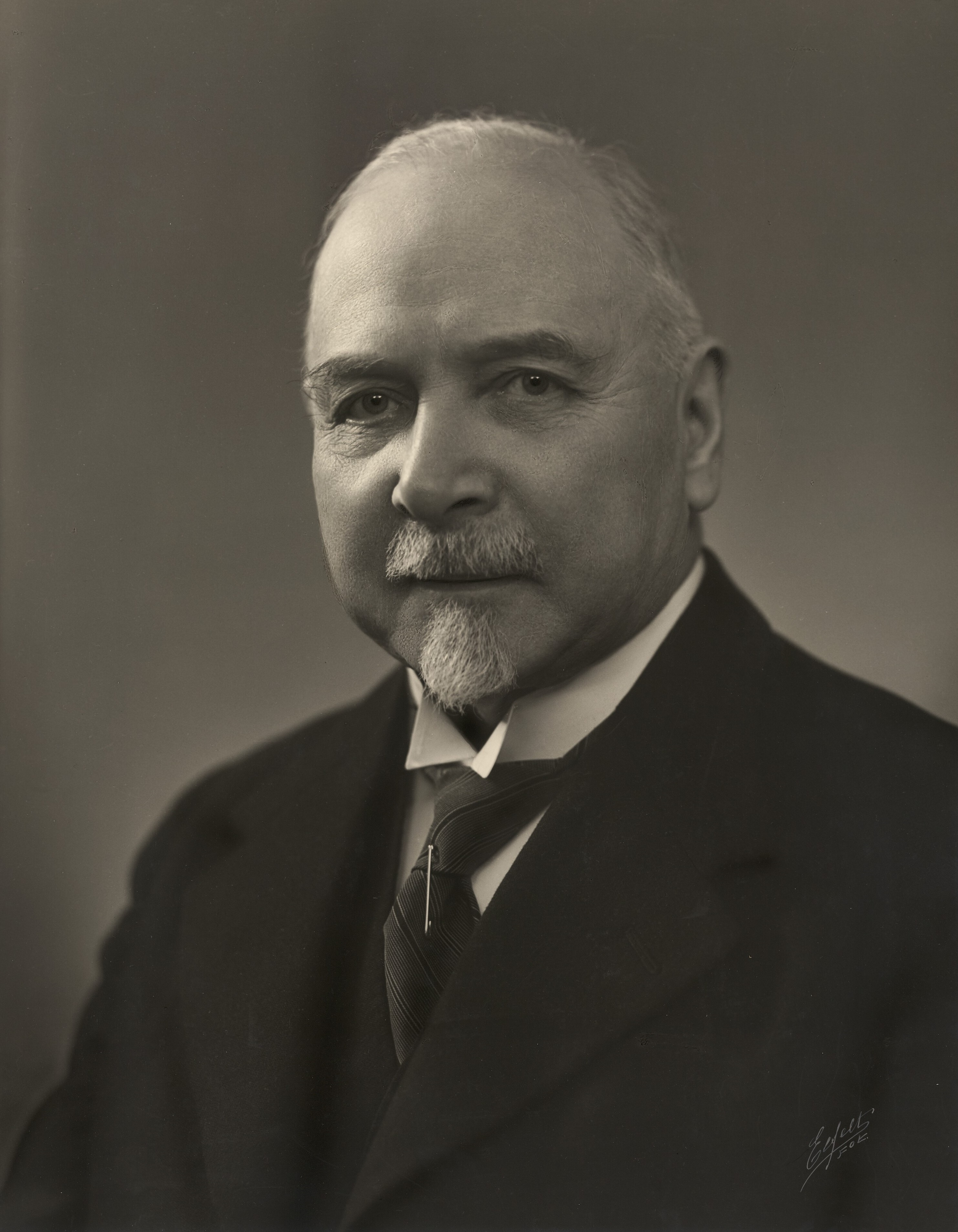

Prime Minister of Denmark
- In office 21 April 1918 – 30 March 1920
- Monarch: Christian X
- Preceded by: Himself (as council president)
- Succeeded by: Otto Liebe

Council President of Denmark
- In office 28 October 1909 – 5 July 1910
- Monarch: Frederik VIII
- Preceded by: Ludvig Holstein-Ledreborg
- Succeeded by: Klaus Berntsen
- In office 21 June 1913 – 20 April 1918
- Monarch: Christian X
- Preceded by: Klaus Berntsen
- Succeeded by: Himself (as Prime Minister)

Minister of Justice
- In office 30 April 1929 – 4 November 1935
- Prime Minister: Thorvald Stauning
- Preceded by: Svenning Rytter
- Succeeded by: Karl Kristian Steincke
- In office 21 June 1913 – 30 March 1920
- Prime Minister: Himself
- Preceded by: Frits Bülow
- Succeeded by: Otto Liebe
- In office 28 October 1909 – 5 July 1910
- Prime Minister: Himself
- Preceded by: Svend Høgsbro
- Succeeded by: Frits Bülow

Personal details
- Born: 19 January 1866 Roskilde, Denmark
- Died: 3 February 1946 (aged 80) Copenhagen, Denmark
- Party: Social Liberal
- Education: University of Copenhagen

Carl Theodor Zahle (19 January 1866 in Roskilde – 3 February 1946 in Copenhagen), was a Danish lawyer and politician who served as the prime minister of Denmark from 1909 to 1910 and again from 1913 to 1920.

In 1895, he was elected as a member of the lower chamber of the Danish parliament, the Folketing, for the Liberal Party (Venstrereformpartiet). A campaigner for peace, in 1905 he co-founded the Social Liberal Party (Det Radikale Venstre) together with other (mostly pacifistic) disgruntled members of Venstrereformpartiet. He continued on as a member of the Folketinget for Det Radikale Venstre until 1928, when he became a member of the upper chamber of parliament (Landsting). In 1929 he became justice minister, a post which he held until 1935.

Zahle was instrumental in starting negotiations for a new Danish–Icelandic Act of Union (Dansk-Islandsk Forbundslov) in 1917, which resulted in Iceland being recognized as a sovereign nation in a personal union with the king of Denmark the following year.

== Early life ==
C. Th. Zahle was born in Roskilde as the son of cobbler Christian Lauritz Gottlieb Zahle and his wife Karen Emilie. He was interested in politics already in high school and saw himself as a convinced democrat in opposition to the Estrup government. He took a degree in law in 1890 and worked for some time at newspapers for instance the newspaper Politiken. In 1894 he passed the bar exam to the high courts.

== Political career ==
In 1895 he was elected to the lower house of the Danish Rigsdag in the Ringsted election district. He won the seat and kept it in subsequent elections until 1928 where he was elected to the upper house of parliament. He kept his seat there until 1939. He was a co-founder of the Left Reform Party (Venstrereformpartiet) in 1895 and became a member of the parliamentary finance committee in 1901.

After disagreements with party leader Jens Christian Christensen (1856–1930) on the defence budget Zahle broke with his party and co-founded the Social Liberal Party (Det Radikale Venstre) in 1905 and became the first chairman of the new party. In 1909 he was able to form a minority government but had to resign as prime minister the year later following an electoral defeat for his party. In 1911 he became mayor of Stege. In 1913 the Social Liberal Party and the Social Democrats got a majority in the lower house and Zahle was able to form a government backed by the Social Democrats. This government was in office until 1920.

Zahle was prime minister during World War I and the main objective for his administration during the war was to keep Denmark neutral. Zahle succeeded in this thanks to foreign minister Erik Scavenius (1877–1962). Although Denmark was neutral the war meant a scarcity of goods and materials and regulation of the economy became necessary. Danish foreign minister Ove Rode (1867–1933) was in charge of these policies.

After the war the opposition had accumulated great anger towards the Zahle government. The government was accused of having been too friendly towards Germany during the war and the economic regulations limited the profits of business life. On top of that came the question about northern Schleswig and in particular Flensburg in Southern Schleswig. A referendum was held on the return of parts of Schleswig to Denmark from Germany and it was demanded that Germany should cede the city of Flensburg with no regards to the result of the referendum. Zahle refused to call for an election on this question and was deposed by King Christian X in 1920. This resulted in the Easter Crisis of 1920 (Påskekrisen 1920) where social liberals, social democrats and socialists saw the king's dismissal of Zahle as unconstitutional.

Zahle never became prime minister again but he became minister of justice under Prime Minister Thorvald Stauning (1873–1942) from 1929 to 1935. He held this portfolio in his own governments and had worked for legal reforms. From 1936 to 1939 he was speaker of the upper house. From 1936 until 1945 he was a board member of nationwide daily Politiken.

== Related reading ==
- Af Jan Baltzersen (2005) Denmark and Southern Jutland during the First World War (Dansk Center for Byhistorie)

Political offices
Preceded by Ludvig Holstein-Ledreborg	Council President of Denmark; 28 October 1909 – 5 July 1910	Succeeded by Klaus Berntsen
Preceded by Svend Høgsbro	Justice Minister of Denmark; 28 October 1909 – 5 July 1910	Succeeded by Frits Bülow
Preceded by Frits Bülow	Justice Minister of Denmark; 21 June 1913 – 30 March 1920	Succeeded by Otto Liebe
Preceded by Klaus Berntsen	Council President of Denmark; 21 June 1913 – 20 April 1918	Succeeded by Office renamed to "Prime Minister"
Preceded by Office renamed from "Council President"	Prime Minister of Denmark; 21 April 1918 – 30 March 1920	Succeeded by Otto Liebe
Preceded by Svenning Rytter	Justice Minister of Denmark; 30 April 1929 – 4 November 1935	Succeeded by Karl Kristian Steincke
Preceded by Jørgen Jensen-Klejs	Speaker of the Landsting; 7 October 1936 – 2 October 1939	Succeeded by C. F. Sørensen
Party political offices
Preceded by New office	Political leader of the Danish Social Liberal Party; 1905–1928	Succeeded by Peter Rochegune Munch
