= Easter Crisis =

Danish constitutional crisis

- Location: Denmark
- Participants: King Christian X Carl Theodor Zahle
- Outcome: The king's role reduced to a symbolic head of state.

The Easter Crisis (Danish: Påskekrisen) was a constitutional crisis in Denmark around Easter in 1920. It was a significant event in the development of constitutional monarchy in Denmark. It began with the dismissal of the elected government by the reigning monarch, King Christian X, a reserve power which was granted to him by the Danish constitution, because he thought that the government did not try to reclaim enough land from Germany in Schleswig. After protests, the King agreed to install a caretaker government who could hold a general election, and no Danish monarch has since interfered in politics.

== Long-running Schleswig-Holstein question ==
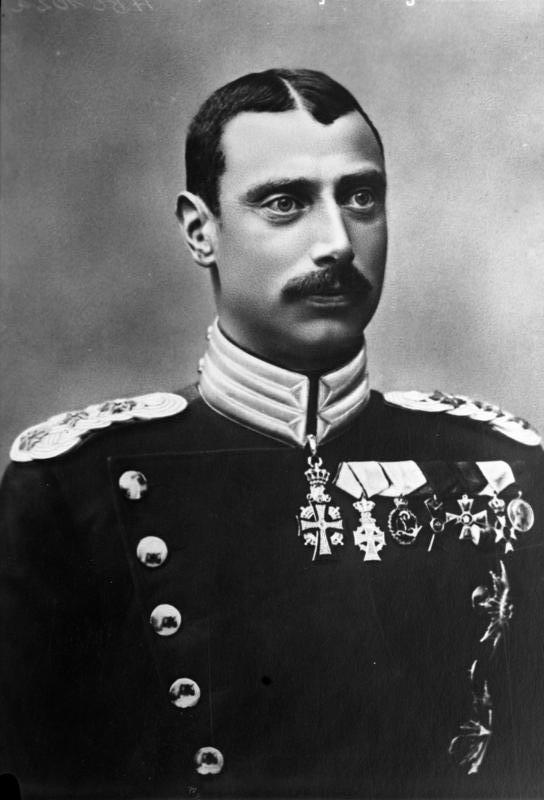
King Christian X in 1925

The immediate cause was a conflict between the king and the cabinet over the reunification with Denmark of Schleswig, a former Danish fiefdom which had been lost to Prussia during the Second War of Schleswig. Danish claims to the region persisted to the end of World War I, at which time the defeat of the Germans made it possible to resolve the dispute. According to the terms of the Treaty of Versailles, the disposition of Schleswig was to be determined by two Schleswig Plebiscites: one in Northern Schleswig (today Denmark's South Jutland County), the other in Central Schleswig (today part of the German state of Schleswig-Holstein). No plebiscite was planned for Southern Schleswig, as it was dominated by an ethnic German majority and, in accordance with prevailing sentiment of the times in favour of the nation state, remained part of the post-war German state.

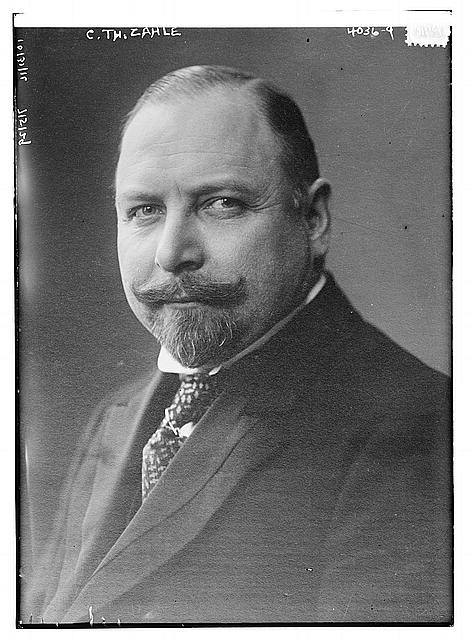
Prime Minister Carl Theodor Zahle

In Northern Schleswig, 75% voted for reunification with Denmark and 25% for remaining with Germany. In Central Schleswig, the situation was reversed with 80% voting for Germany and 20% for Denmark. In light of these results, the government of Prime Minister Carl Theodor Zahle determined that reunification with Northern Schleswig could go forward, while Central Schleswig would remain under German control.

Many Danish nationalists felt that Central Schleswig should be returned to Denmark regardless of the plebiscite's results, generally motivated by a desire to see Germany permanently weakened in the future. Christian agreed with these sentiments, and ordered Prime Minister Zahle to include Central Schleswig in the re-unification process. As Denmark had been operating as a parliamentary democracy since the Cabinet of Deuntzer in 1901, Zahle felt he was under no obligation to comply. He refused the order and resigned several days later, after a heated exchange with the king.

== Christian X dismisses government ==
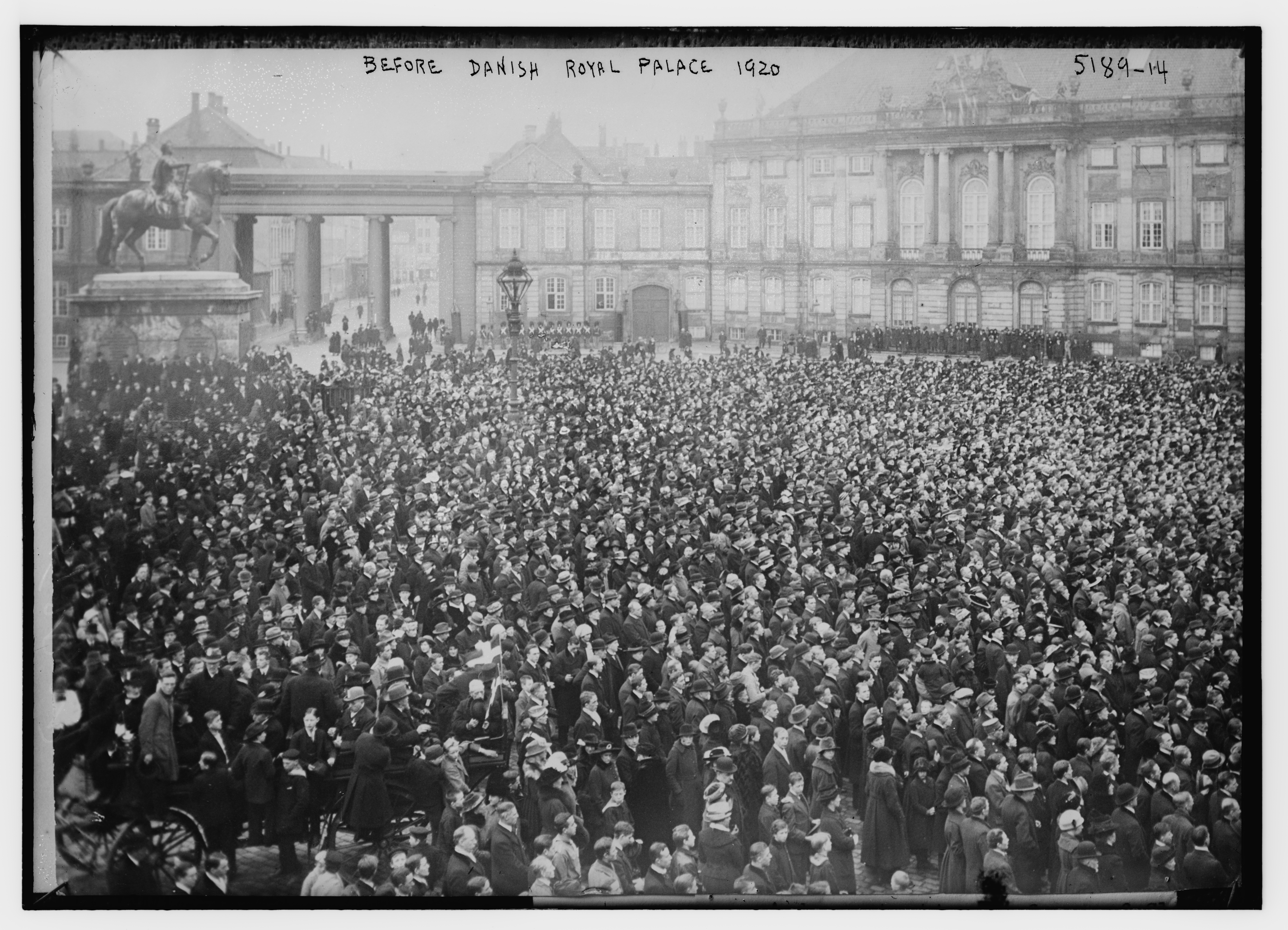
Demonstrations against the king at Amalienborg Square in 1920.

Subsequently, Christian dismissed the rest of the government and replaced it with a de facto conservative caretaker cabinet under Otto Liebe. The dismissal caused demonstrations and an almost revolutionary atmosphere in Denmark, and for several days, the future of the monarchy seemed very much in doubt. In light of this, negotiations were opened between the king and members of the Social Democrats.

== Christian X appoints more widely accepted prime minister ==
Faced with the potential overthrow of the Danish crown, Christian backed down and dismissed his own government, installing as a compromise cabinet under Michael Pedersen Friis until elections could be held later that year.

This was the most recent time that a sitting Danish monarch took political action without the full support of parliament. Following the crisis, Christian accepted his drastically reduced role as symbolic head of state. The Danish constitution remains largely unchanged in this area, giving the same powers to the current monarch that Christian used.

== See also ==
- King–Byng Affair
- 1975 Australian constitutional crisis
- King Baudouin

== Other sources ==
- Tage Kaarsted (1968) Påskekrisen 1920 (Skrifter udgivet af Jysk Selskab for Historie, Number 23. Aarhus: Universitetsforlaget. p. 426)
