= Jacob Scavenius =

Danish politician (1838–1915)

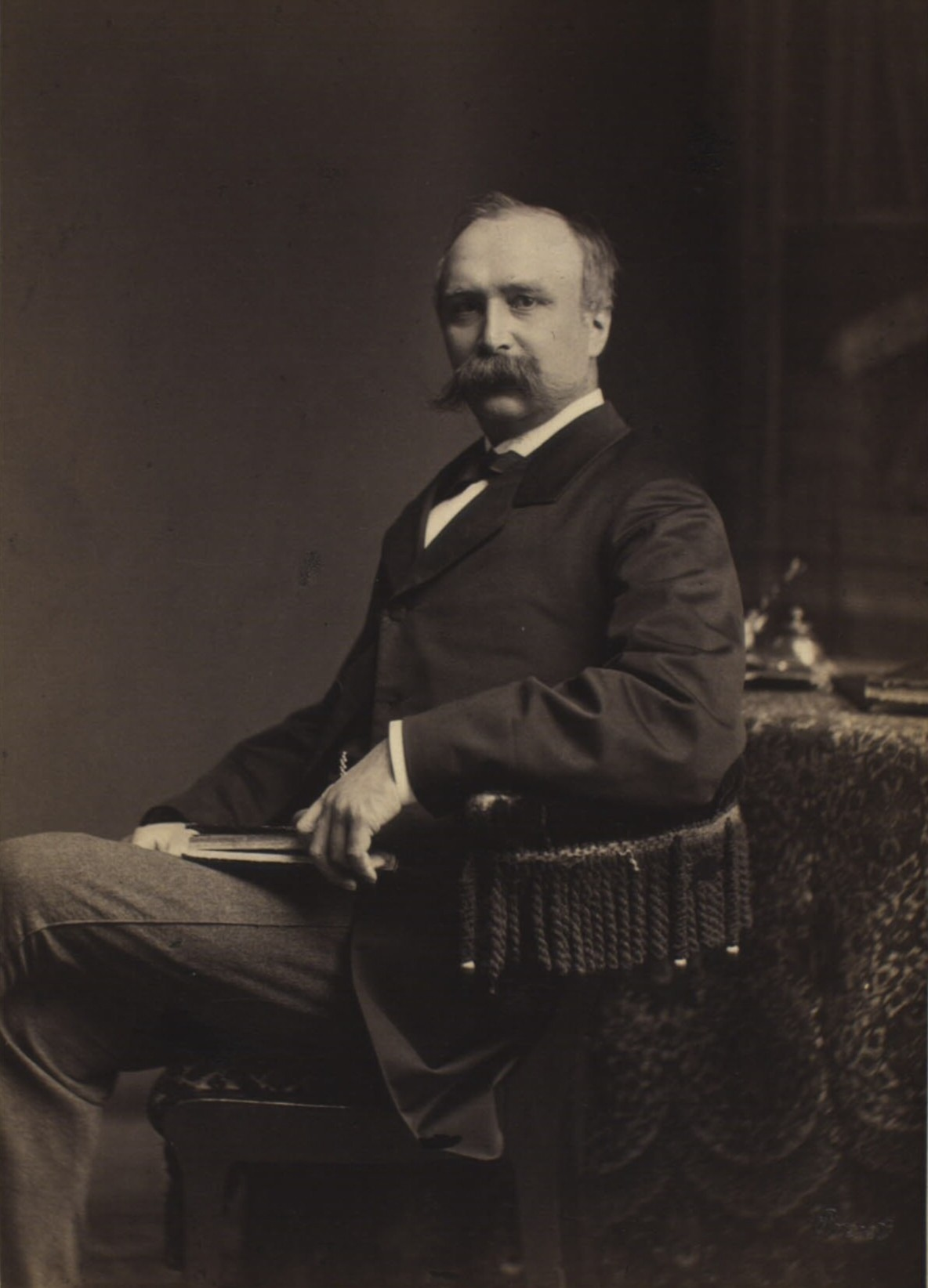

Kultus Minister of Denmark
- In office 24 August 1880 – 6 July 1891
- Monarch: Christian IX
- Preceded by: Johan Christian Henrik Fischer
- Succeeded by: Johannes Nellemann

Personal details
- Born: 12 September 1838 Copenhagen
- Died: 26 November 1915 (aged 77) Copenhagen, Denmark
- Party: Højre

Jacob (Jakob) Frederik Scavenius (12 September 1838 – 26 November 1915) was a Danish landowner and politician. A member of the Folketinget, he served as Minister of Education from 1880 to 1891.

== Early life and education ==
Scavenius was born on 12 September 1838 in Copenhagen, the son of Peder Brønnum Scavenius and Charlotte S. Meincke. He graduated from Metropolitanskolen in 1857 and earned a degree in economics in 1867.

== Career ==
Scavenius inherited Gjorslev in 1868. Scavenius was first elected for Folketinget in 1865. He served as Minister of Education from 24 August 1880 to 6 July 1891.

== Personal life and death ==
Scavenius married Louise Sophie Castonier on 21 June 1865. He was the father of Harald Scavenius. He died on 26 November 1915 and is buried at Holtug Cemetery.

== Honours ==
- Cross of Honour, 1864
- Knight in the Order of the Dannebrog, 1878
- Commander of the 2nd Class, 1881
- Commander of the 1st Class, 1884
- Grand Cross, 1888
- Medal of Merit in Gold, 1903
