= Lindencrone Mansion =

Building in Copenhagen, Denmark

- Lindencrones Palæ
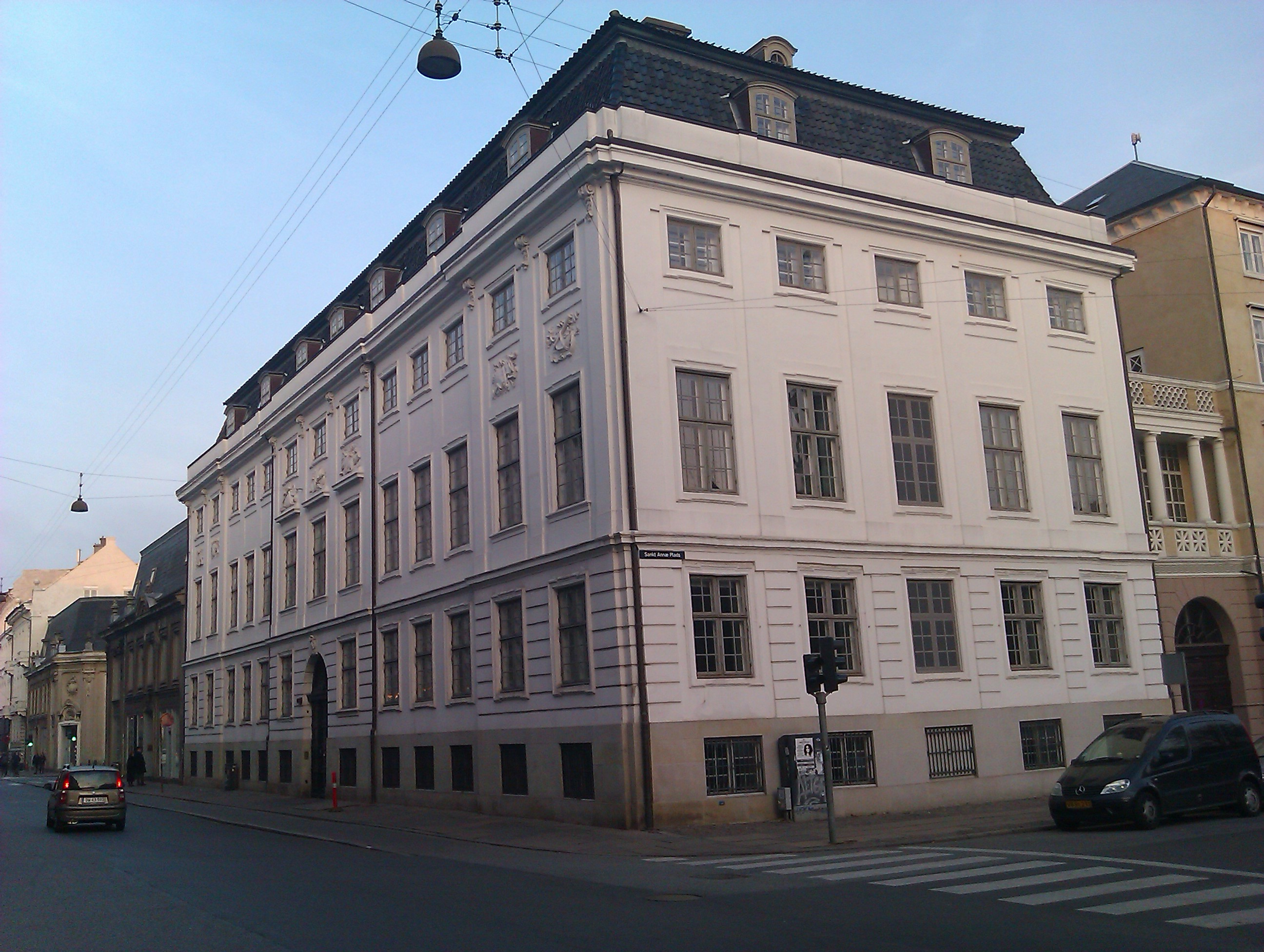
- Interactive map of the Lindencrone Mansion area

General information
- Architectural style: Rococo
- Location: Frederiksstaden, Copenhagen, Denmark
- Coordinates: 55°40′57.35″N 12°35′20.49″E
- Construction started: 1751
- Completed: 1753
- Client: Christen Lindencrone
- Owner: Troels Holch Povlsen

Design and construction
- Architect: Nicolai Eigtved

The Lindencrone Mansion (Danish: Lindencrones Palæ) is a historic building located on the corner of Bredgade and Sankt Annæ Plads in central Copenhagen, Denmark. Completed in 1753, it is one of many town mansions which were built for wealthy citizens in the district Frederiksstaden in the years after its foundation in the middle of the 18th century.

== History ==
=== Lindencrone family ===
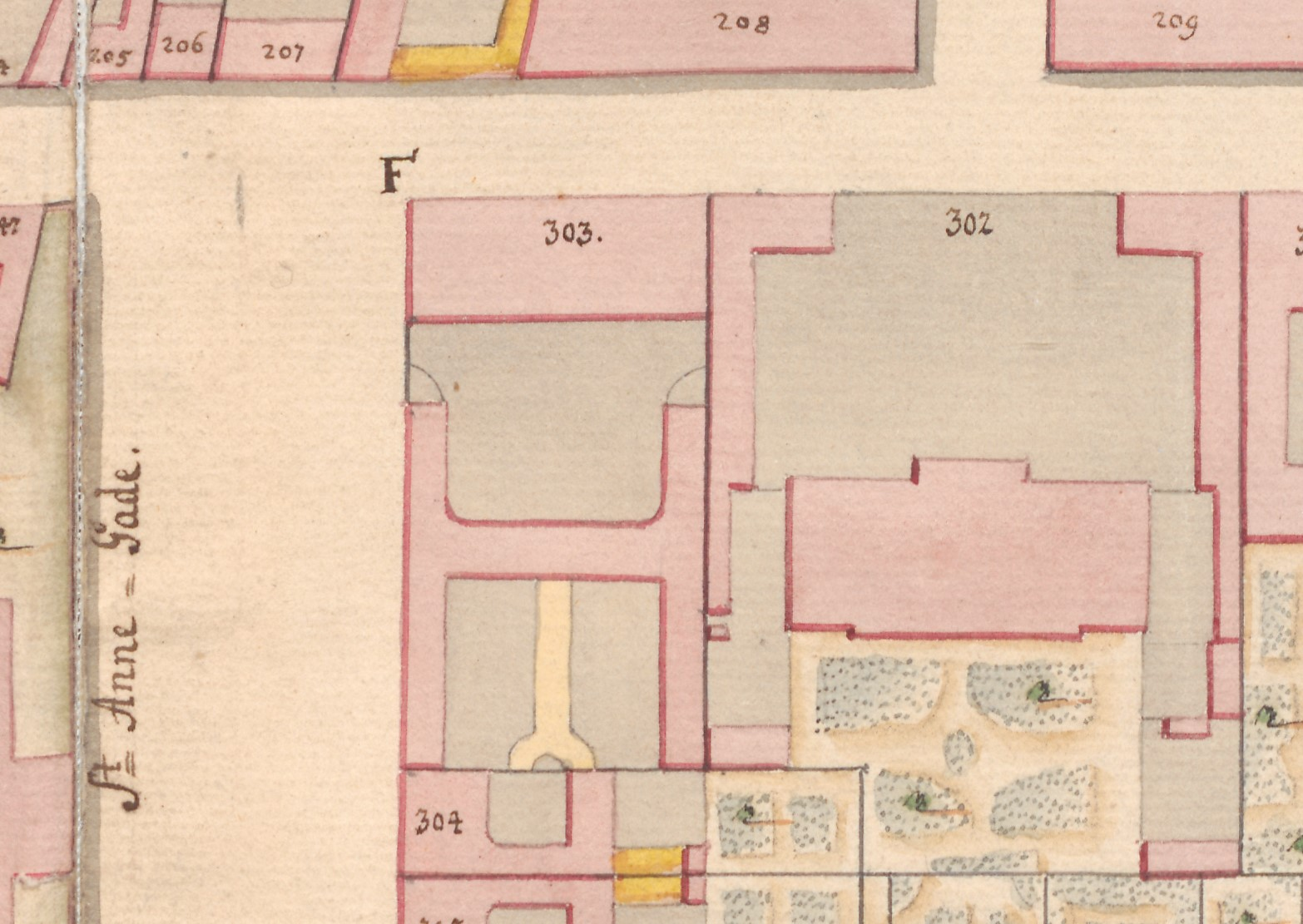
No. 303 seen in a detail from Christian Gedde's map of St. Ann's East Quarter, 1757

The Lindencrone Mansion was one of the earliest town mansions that was completed in Copenhagen's new Frederiksstaden neighbourhood. It was built in 1751-53 as a new city residence for Christen Lintrup, supercargo in Danish Asia Company, who already owned Gjorslev Manor on Stevns and was raised to the peerage under the name Lindencrone in 1756. The building was constructed by the master builder Christian Conradi to a design or concept by Niels Eigtved who had also created the masterplan for the new district. Court sculptor Jacob Fortling was responsible for creating the decorations on the facade. Lindencrone rented out part of his mansion to foreign envoys.

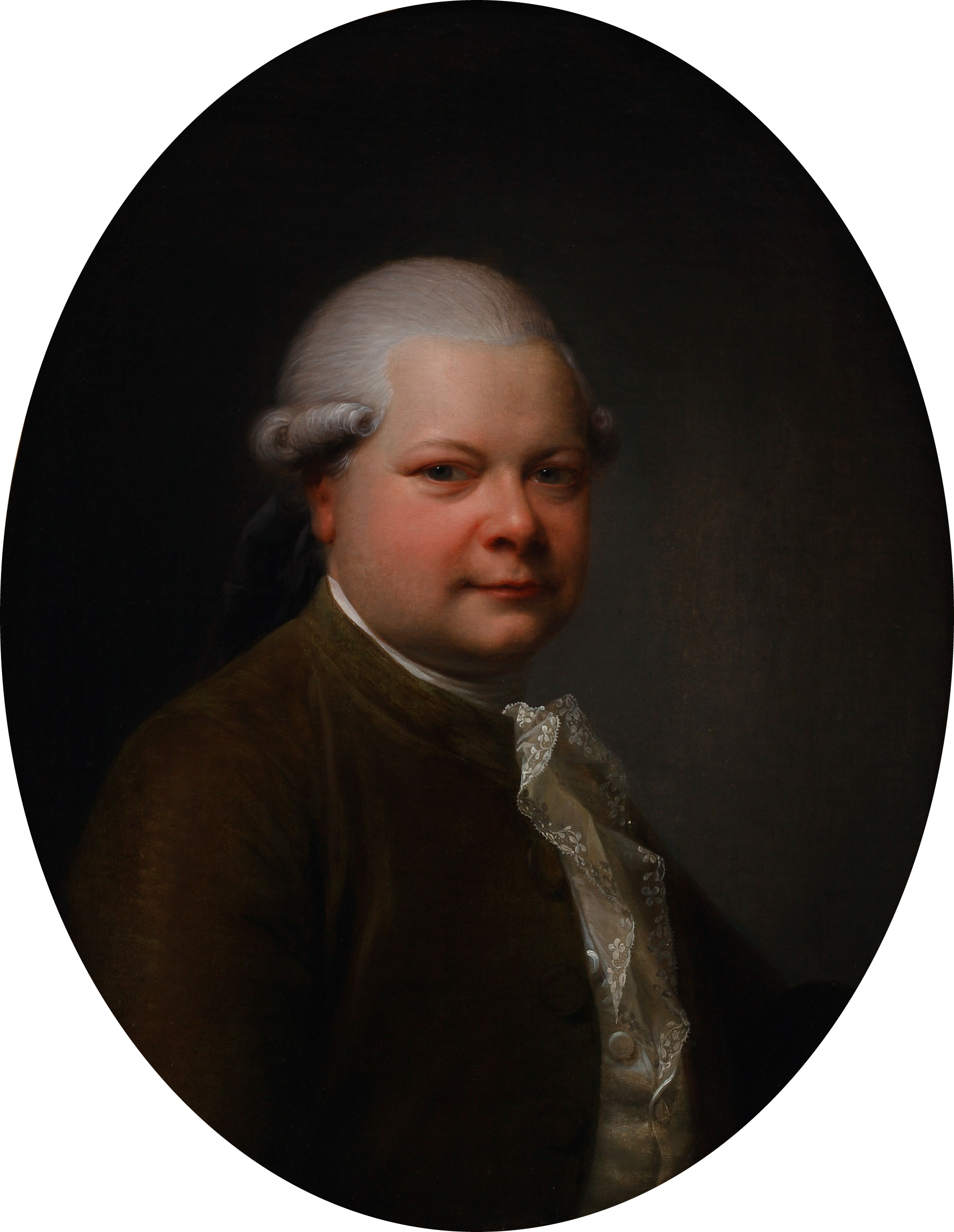
Johan Frederik Lindencrone

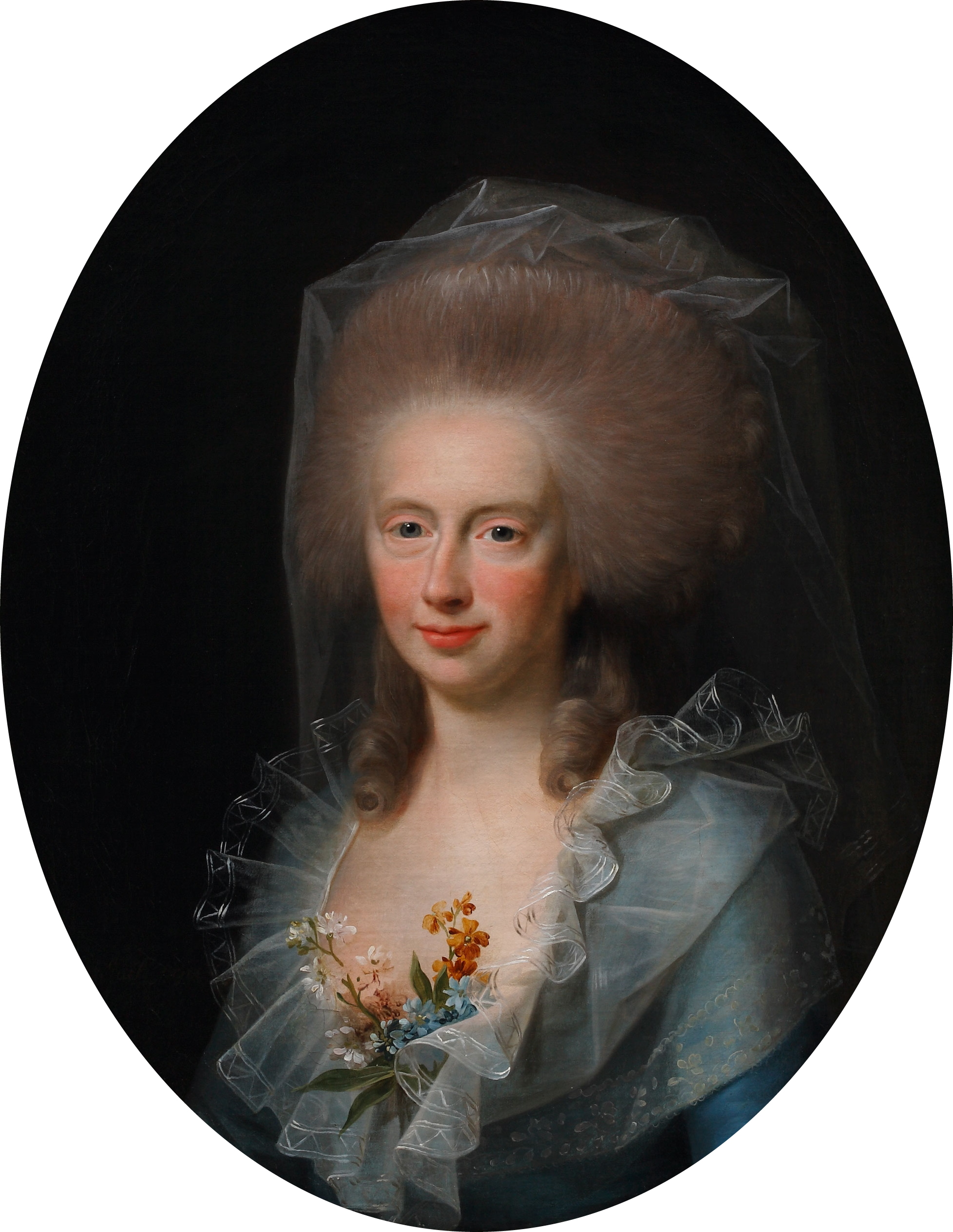
Bolette Lindencrone by Juel

Lindencrone's widow, Mette Holmsted, kept the property on Bredgade as her winter residence after her husband's death. Their son, Johan Friedrich Lindencrone, lived in the mansion from 1772 and became its owner after his mother died in 1789. He suffered from economic difficulties and sold off a portion of the garden to city builder Jørgen Henrich Rawert in 1794.

=== 19th century: Raben, Fibiger, Broch and Næser ===
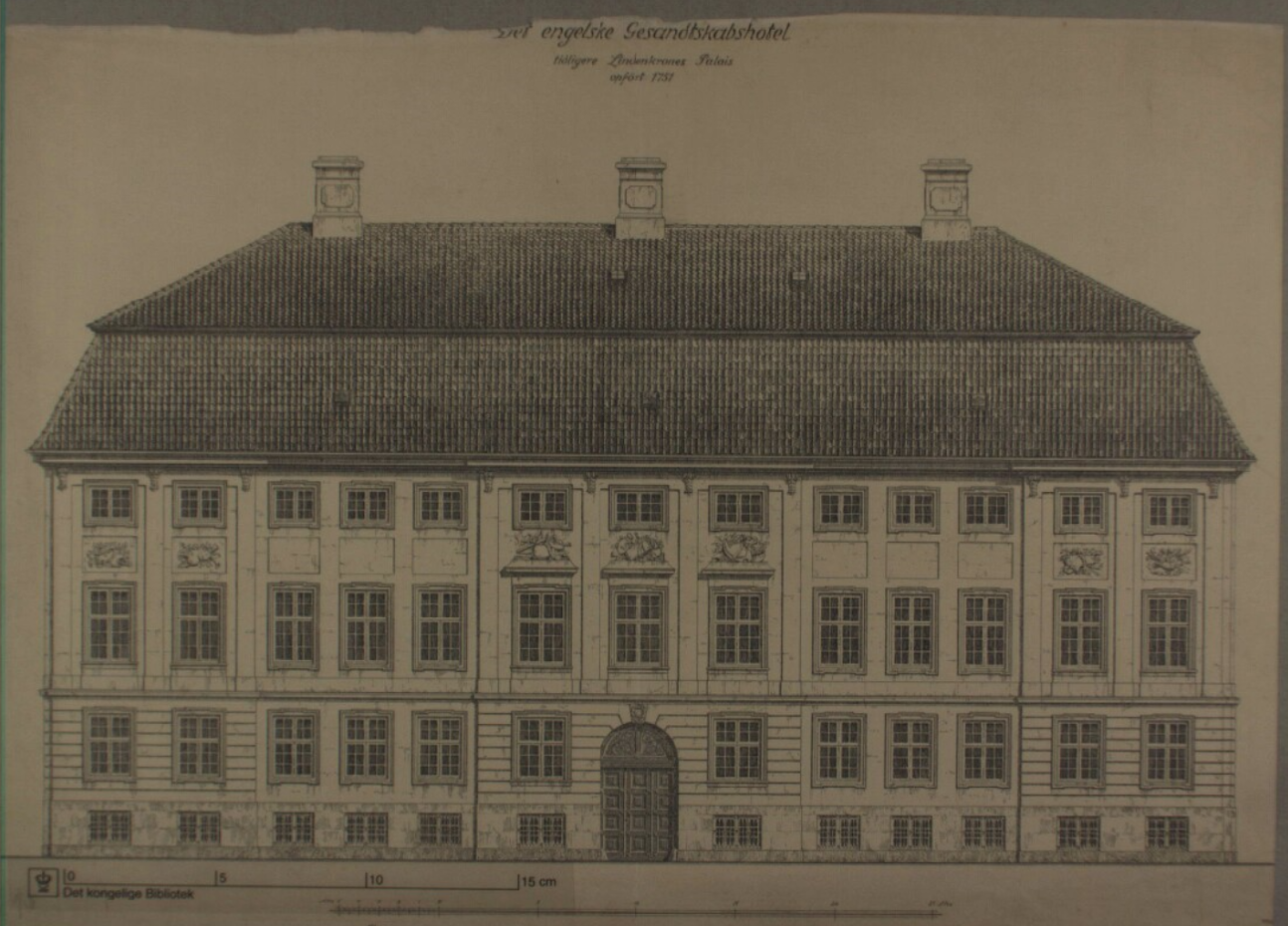
Lindencrone Mansion

Lindencrone did not recover from his economic difficulties and had to part with the property in 1811. The buyer was count Frederik Christian Raben, a widely traveled amateur naturalist, who owned the Christiansholm estate on Lolland. In 1816, he rented the building out to the Swedish state as a new home for their diplomatic mission in Copenhagen but the embassy moved again after a few years.

The Raben family owned the Lindencrone Mansion until 1840. It was then acquired by Adolph Christian Fibiger, a manufacturer of ship sails, who built the neighbouring property at Sankt Annæ Plads 1–3. The following owners were Caroline Fibiger, his widow, Gustav E. Broch, a lawyer, and the merchant Albert Næser.

The property was home to 23 residents in three households at the 1840 census. Adolph Christian Fibiger resided in the building with his wife Caroline Hedevig Klingberg, their four-year-old twin sons Adolph Wilhelm Fibiger and Peter Christian Fibiger, one male servant and two maids. Five sercants for grand Minister Baron Schoultz von Aschenraden were also residing together in the building. Søren Petersen, a carriage maker, resided in the rear wing with his wife Johanne Søeholm, their two-year-old daughter Ane Hansine Petersen, one maid, three carriage makers (employees) and four apprentices.

Søren Petersen was still based in the rear wing at the 1845 census.

=== 20th century to present ===
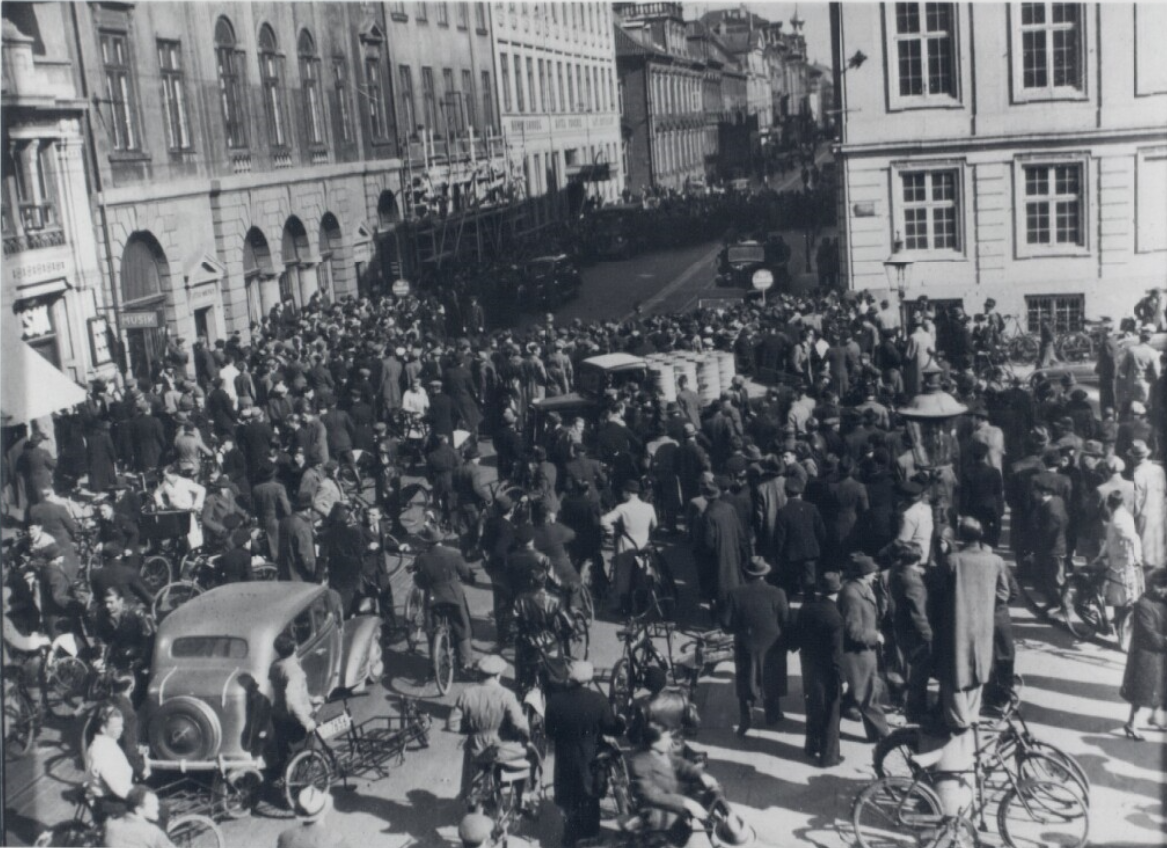
9 April 1940: German soldiers arresting employees at the British embassy

The British embassy was based in the building from circa 1850 and the British State acquired the building in 1898. The embassy closed temporarily when Denmark was occupied by Nazi Germany during World War II. The embassy reopened after the end of the war in 1945. Winston Churchill stayed in the building during his visit to Copenhagen in 1950 to receive the Order of the Elephant.

The British embassy relocated to Kastelsvej in Østerbro in 1979 and the British state then sold the building to Niels Stellan Høm. It was then home to an insurance company for many years.

Bestseller-founder Troels Holch Povlsen purchased the building in 2003. It was then subject to a major restoration with the assistance of the architects Bue Beck and arkitekt Leif Jørgen. It was completed in 2006.

== Architecture ==
The mansion is built in a restrained Rococo style and consists of three storeys and a high cellar under a black mansard roof. The facade is constructed in limestone ashlars from Lindencrone's estate at Stevns.

The main facade on Bredgade is 13 bays long. It has slightly projecting central and corner bays but is brought together by a horizontal moulding along its full length above the ground floor. The projections are decorated with lesenes with square "ears", a feature often used by Eigtved, corbels and reliefs above the ground floor which in turn have horizontal grooves. The sections between the projections have shallow niches but no lesenes.

The facade on Annæ Plads is five bays long. It has niches and lesenes, which unlike those of the main facade run along the full height of the building, also on the ground floor where they carry the horizontal grooves.

== List of owners ==
- 1750-1772. Christen Jensen Lintrup Lindencrone
- 1772-1772: Mette Holmsted, married name Lindencrone
- 1772-1812: Johan Frederik Christensen Lindencrone
- 1812-1838: Frederik Christian Raben
- 1838-1840: Raben family
- 1840-1863: Adolph Christian Fibiger
- 1863-1878: Gustav Edvard Brock
- 1878-1879: Estate after Gustav Edvard Brock
- 1879-1898: Carl Albert Næser
- 1898-1980: United Kingdom
- 1980-1980: Pilot- og Navigatørforeningen
- 1980-2003: Niels Stellan Høm
- 2003–present: Troels Holch Povlsen

== See also ==
- Prince William Mansion, Copenhagen
