= Christoffer Urne =

Danish statesman

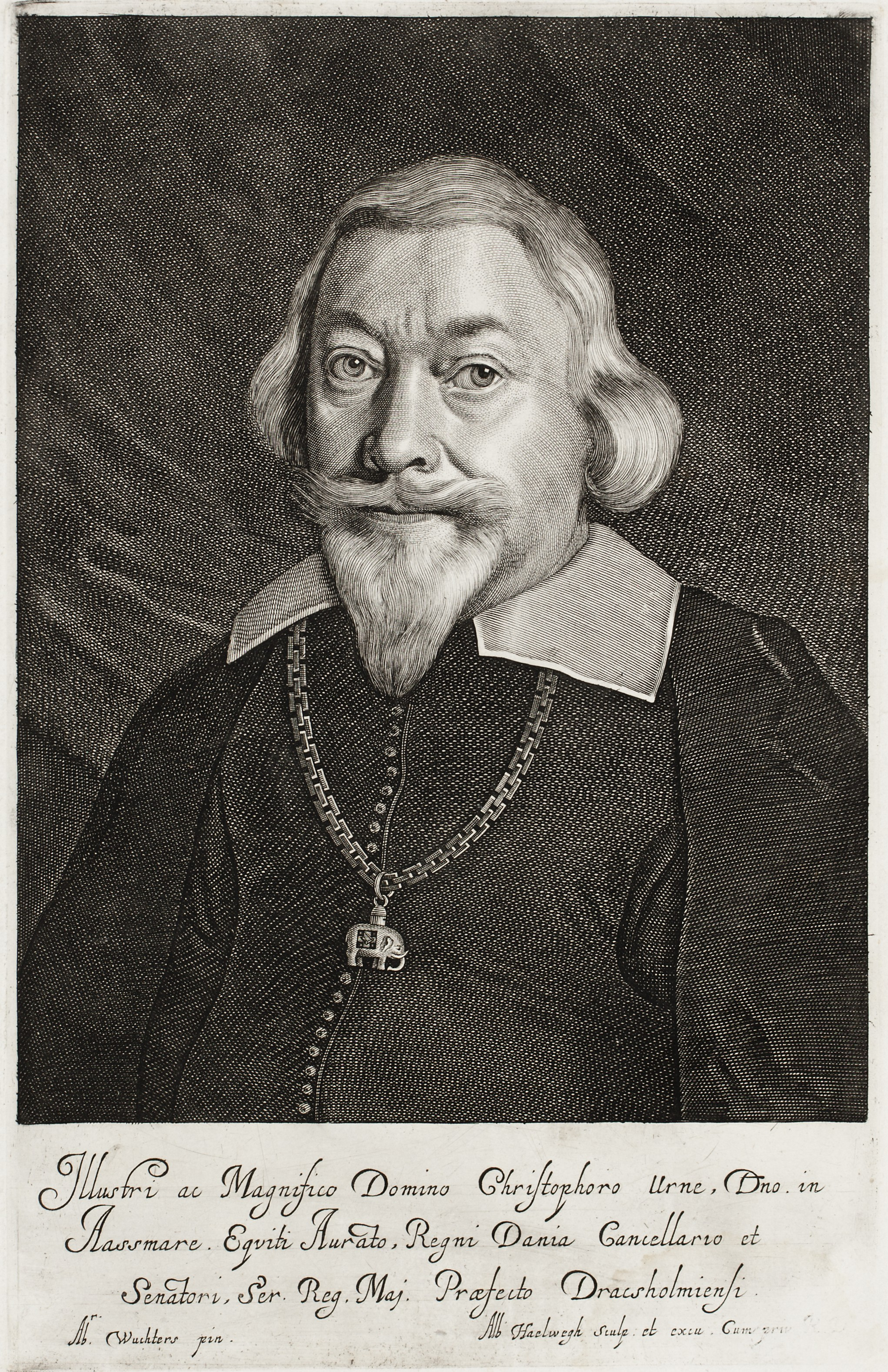
- Portrait by Albert Haelwegh, c. 1650

Governor-general of Norway
- In office 1629–1642
- Monarch: Christian IV
- Preceded by: Jens Hermansson Juel
- Succeeded by: Hannibal Sehested

Chancellor of the Realm
- In office 1646–1663
- Preceded by: Just Høg
- Succeeded by: Peder Reedtz

Personal details
- Born: Christoffer Knudsson Urne; 27 October 1593 Halsted Priory, Denmark
- Died: 27 September 1663 (aged 69) Nielstrup, Denmark
- Resting place: Nykøbing Falster
- Relations: Jørgen Knudsen Urne (brother)
- Awards: Knight of the Elephant (1648)

Christoffer Knudsson Urne of Årsmarke (27 October 1593 – 27 September 1663) was a Danish statesman and landholder. He served as Royal Treasurer from 1617 to 1627, Governor-General of Norway from 1629 to 1642 and as Chancellor of the Realm from 1646.

== Early life and education ==
Urne was born at Halsted Priory on the island of Lolland, Denmark. He was a son of Knud Axelsen Urne til Årsmarke (1564–1622) and Margrethe Eilersdatter Grubbe til Alslev (1568–1654). He was a brother-in-law of Ove Gjedde who married his sister Dorothy Knudsdatter Urne (1600-1667). He attended Sorø Academy 1605-09 and travelled 6 years in Europe.

== Career ==
Urne became secretary of the chancellor of Denmark until he became a treasurer in 1617, which he remained until 1627. In 1627 was granted supervision of Nykøbing and Ålholm and made commissioner-general of the market towns of Lolland and Falster. He served as Steward of Norway from 1629 to 1642. After 13 years in Norway he returned to Denmark.

In 1646, Urne succeeded Just Høg as Chancellor of the Realm (rigskansler). He escorted Christian IV to the Norwegian herredag in Christiania.

== Property ==
Urne inherited KnuthenborgÅrsmarke from his father. His wife brought Søbysøgård into the marriage. He also bought Nielstrup and Fårevejle.

Throughout his career he was rewarded with numerous royal fiefs. They included Aalholm, Akershus, Tranekær and Dragsholm. From 1658 he was granted Lyse Abbey which he exchanged the year after for Halsnøy Abbey which he retained until his death in 1663.

== Personal life ==
On 18 July 1624 Urne married Sophie Hansdatter Lindenov (1608–1652), daughter of Hans Johansen Lindenov and Lisbeth Sophie Rantzau. In 1628 they became the parents of Christian Urne (1628–1669) later a magistrate on Funen.

Christoffer Urne donated a new altarpiece to the church Egebjerg Church in Odsherred. He died on 27 September 1663 and was buried in Nykøbing Falster.
