= Klintholm Manor =

Manor house in Vordingborg Municipality, Denmark

Klintholm
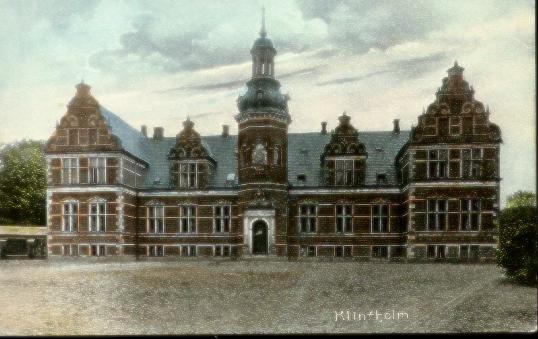
- Interactive map of the Klintholm area

General information
- Location: Klintholm Allé 1B; 4791 Borre, Denmark
- Coordinates: 54°58′42″N 11°30′10″E
- Completed: 1873

Design and construction
- Architect: August Klein

Klintholm is an estate near Mons Klint on the Danish island of Møn. Originally owned by the Crown, since 1798 the estate has belonged to the Scavenius family. In 1838, a three-winged stone complex was built by G.F. Hetsch in the Neoclassical style. In 1875, a new manor house designed by August Klein in the Renaissance Revival style was completed, but it was demolished in 2000.

== History ==
=== 17th century ===
In the middle of the 18th century, the area was part of the crown estate of Højemøn. The crown land on Møn was in 1769 divided into five estates and sold at public auction. Estate No. 5 was sold to Hans Tersling from Falster for 50,000 rigsdaler.

In 1774, Tersling sold the estate to Ditlev Staal, a merchant from Stubbejøbing, for 42,358 rigsdaler. He also purchased Pølsegården, a farm that Tersling had failed to acquire, where he most likely resided until the buildings on the Klintholm estate had been completed. In 1779, he started out by constructing stables, a dairy, a barn, a grainery and a house for the manager (forvalterbolig). In 1788, he was able to move into the new main building. The dairy was 48 m (157 ft) long and 13 m (43 ft) wide. It was around this period that the name Klintholm appeared for the first time. Until then, the estate had been known as Klintegodset (the cliff estate). Staal maintained ownership for only 10 years until his death in 1797.

=== Jacob and Kathrine Brønnum Scavenius ===
In June 1798, Staal's widow sold Klintholm to Jacob Brønnum Scavenius for 102,000 rigsdaler. Scavenius was already the owner of Gjorslev, Søholm and Erikstrup manors. He resided at Gjorslev and in an apartment in Skindergade in Copenhagen.

Scavenius purchased numerous properties in the surroundings, extending the estate to an area of some 3,000 ha (7,400 acres).

In 1819, all the Klintholm buildings were destroyed by fire but were quickly reconstructed by Scavenius' widow Kathrine in 1820. The new complex included a brick factory and a limestone plant.

=== Peder Brønnum Scavenius ===
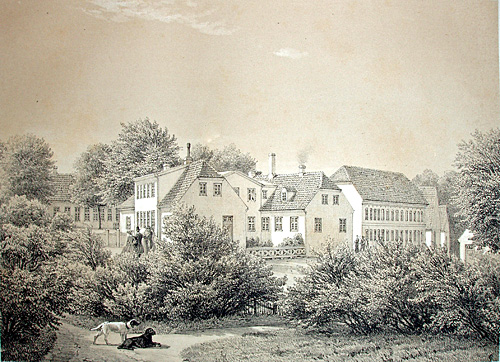
Klintholm in 1861

On Kathrine Scavenius' death in 1825, Klintholm passed to her second eldest son, Lucas Frederik Scavenius. In 1826, he sold it to his elder brother, Peder Brønnum Scavenius. In 1737, he constructed a new main building as a replacement for the one that had been destroyed in 1819. In 1842, he also constructed a large new barn.

=== Carl Scavenius and his new main building ===
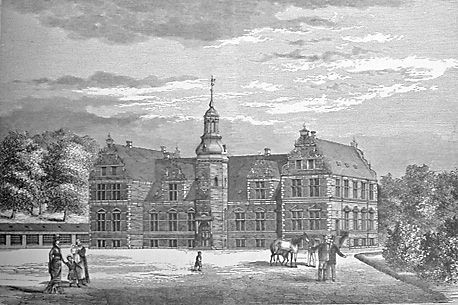
The new main building

On Peder Brønnum Scavenius' death in 1878, Klintholm went to Carl Sophus Scavenius while his brother Jacob received Gjorslev. Carl and his wife Thyra Castonier made the estate their principal home in 1869, as the first owners since Staal's death in 1797.

Carl Scavenius, who found the main building too small for his wife and 10 children, built a grandiose new manor in 1873–75. In 1878, he started the construction of Klintholm Havn, which served to transport the estate's products. The complex comprised a warehouse, an inn and a ship chandler.

=== Later history ===
In 1945, the estate came into the hands of Carl Christian Scavenius. He managed it with great enthusiasm, acquiring Denmark's first herd of Hereford cattle. He encouraged tourism by setting up the Møns Klint Camping and the Ålekroen, a restaurant in Klinthom Havn.

== Architecture ==
The manor house built in 1873 was known as Kammerherreboligen. It was designed by August Klein in the so-called Rosenborg style, a Renaissance variant based on the architecture of Rosenborg Castle. With its tower, projecting lateral wings, mansard roof, Dutch gables, large windows and sculpted limestone decorations, the grandiose building fully reflected the Historicist trends of the time. Inside, the main entrance below the tower led into a large vaulted hall with rich stucco decorations, similar those in the other ground-floor rooms with their fine parquet floors. The library was particularly impressive, with its carved shelving. The decorations were the work of Adolph Hellesen (1831–1890).

Dry rot first began to appear in the building in the 1940s. After the family moved out in 1964, it spread more quickly. In 1983, many of the furnishings and artefacts were auctioned off. Judged unsafe by the authorities, the building was demolished in the spring of 2000.

== List of owners ==
- ( –1769) Kronen
- (1769–1798) Ditlev Staal
- (1798–1820) Jacob Brønnum Scavenius
- (1820–1825) Karina Lucia Debes, gift Scavenius
- (1825–1826) Lucas Frederik Scavenius
- (1826–1868) Peder Brønnum Scavenius
- (1868–1901) Carl Sophus Scavenius
- (1901–1918) Annie Julie Emely Gustave Thyra Scavemois (née de Castonier)
- (1918–1946) Carl Sophus Scavenius
- (1946– ) Carl Christian Brønnum Scavenius
- (2007– ) Peter Scavenius
- (2007–present) Carl Gustav Scavenius

== Literature ==
- Bibliotek, Møn (2006). Hundrede år med Møn. Møn Bibliotek. ISBN 978-87-990731-1-5.
