= Peder Brønnum Scavenius =

Danish politician

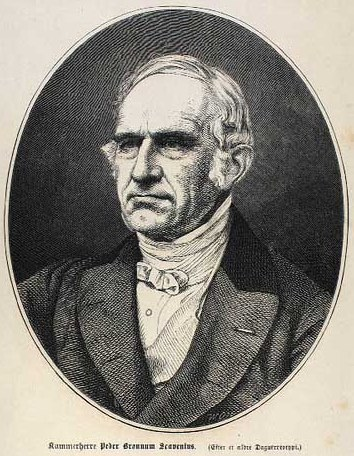
- Born: 6 January 1795; Copenhagen, Denmark
- Died: 4 December 1868 (aged 73); Gjorslev, Denmark
- Occupations: Landowner and politician
- Awards: Commander of the Dannebrog

Peder Brønnum Scavenius (6 January 1795 - 4 December 1868) was a Danish landowner and politician. He was the owner of Gjorslev on the Stevns Peninsula, Klintholm on Møn and Petersgaard at Vordingborg. He was an also involved in politics and by royal appointment a member of the Danish Constituent Assembly.

== Early life and career ==
Scavenius was born on 6 January 1795 in Copenhagen, the eldest son of Jacob Brønnum Scavenius and Karine L. Debes. His father had purchased Gjorslev, Erikstrup and Søholm on Stevns from the Lindencrone family in 1793 after spending 14 years in the service of the Danish Asiatic Company in Bengal. Peder Brønnum Scavenius earned a law degree (cand.jur.) in 1816 and then worked for the Treasury until 1834.

== Property and titles ==
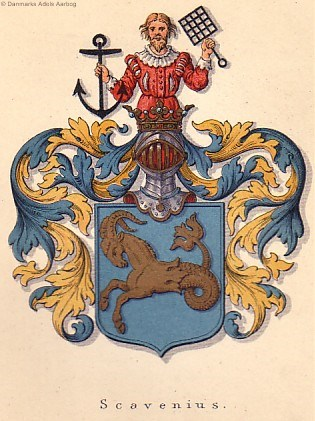
Scavenius' coat of arms

Scavenius inherited Gjorslev and the other estates on Stevns upon his mother's death in 1825. He purchased Klintholm Manor on Møn from his younger brother in 1926. He purchased Petersgaard at [[Vordingborg[]] in 1864.

He was appointed as Kammerjunker in 1818 and chamberlain (Kammerherre) in 1840. He was ennobled in 1843. He was made a Knight in the Order of the Dannebrog in 1945 and a Commander in the Order of the Dannebrog in 1854.

== Politics and public offices ==
In June 1837, Scavenius was elected as one of 15 board members of a committee that worked for the creation of the Thorvaldsen Museum in Copenhagen. He was for a while president of Præstø Amts Landøkonomiske Forening and a member of Præstø County Council in 1842–54. He instigated the construction of Rødvig Harbour9. He was a member of Roskilde Constituent Assembly (Roskilde Stænderforsamling) in 1835– 48 and was later appointed by the king for the Danish Constituent Asscembly in 1848–49. He was a defensor of the estate owners' rights, arguing in favour of a model which only converted half of all copyholds into freeholds while the other half should remain in the free ownership of estate owners. He opposed the idea of a free constitution, arguing in favour of keeping kongeloven in a modified form and describing the king's position in the new constitution as "an automat...[...]...a decorated Puppet which for festive occasions could be displayed in Processions for the amusement of the public". Scavenius' proposal was only supported by six votes. He was not elected for the new rigsdag but was appointed for rigsrådet by the king in 1854–59. He was one of the founders of the October Association in 1865.

== Personal life ==
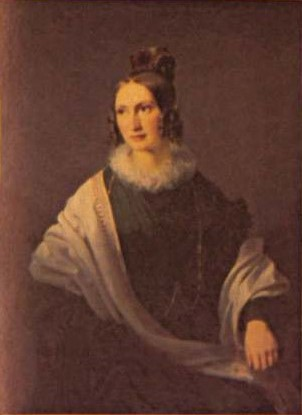
Charlotte Scavenius, née Meincke

Scavenius married Charlotte Sophie Meincke (8 December 1811 – 24 June 1872) on 12 May 1837 in the Church of Our Lady in Copenhagen. She was a daughter of military prosecutor Carl Henrik Lydius Meincke (1787–1862) and Anna Elisabeth Dorothea Falck (1784–1863). He was the father of Jacob Scavenius (1838–1915).

Scavenius was an amateur astronomer and the owner of an extensive collection of maps and books. He died on 4 December 1868 and is buried at Holtug Cemetery.

His eldest son Jacob Scavenius inherited Ghorslev, his second son Carl Scavenius inherited Klintholm and the youngest son inherited Petersgaard. Klintholm is still owned by the family.
