= Peder Svave =

Pomerania-born Danish-Norwegian diplomat and privy councillor

Peder Svave (1496 – 16 March 1552) was a Pomerania-born Danish diplomat, privy councillor and rector of the University of Copenhagen. He owned Gjorslev Manor south of Copenhagen.

== Early life and education ==
Scave was born in Stolp, Pomerania, the son of Gregor Svave and Elisabeth von Zitzewitz. His parents intended him for a career as a clergy. He received his schooling in Stolp and Stettin before studying at the universities in Leuwen and Leipzig. He then continued to Wittenberg, where he became a devoted supporter of Martin Luther, whom he in 1521 accompanied to the Diet of Worms. He then returned to Pomerania where his friend Johannes Bugenhagen had invited him to lecture at Belbuck Abbey. Back in his home town Stolp, he was later imprisoned by Duke Bugislav X, but soon released with the assistance of friends. After his immatriculation in 1524, he became a lecturer at the University of Greifswald.

== Career in Denmark ==
By early 1526, Svave had been called to Denmark by Frederick I. The king may either have become aware of Svave through Duke Christian (III) and Johan Rantzau, who had been present at the Diet of Worms, or through his queen consort, Sophie, a daughter of Bogislaw X, Duke of Pomerania. In the summer of 1526 he wrote a reply (Friderici Daniæ Regis ... ad Christierni Patruelis calumnias responsio) to Cornelius Scepper's defense of Christian II. Svave also served as tutor for the king's second eldest son, Duke John. With title of secretary, he was later sent on diplomatic missions, for instance to France in 1528 and 1531 and to England in 1531. In early 1532, after Christian II had started a campaign in Norway, Svave was again sent to France in early 1532 to gain the support of Francis I against him.

In 1530–31, Svave was appointed as rector of the University of Copenhagen. At the outbreak of the Count's Feud in 1534, Svave was together with Duke John and his hoffmeister Oluf Nielsen Rosenkrantz present at Nyborg Castle. He accompanied them to Sønderborg Castle where Duke Christian started to use him as a diplomat. In early 1535, he was sent on a mostly unsuccessful diplomatic mission to the Netherlands, England and Scotland. In September that same year he was sent to France. On the way back, in December, he attended the Schmalkaldic League's conference at Schmalkalden.

In 1536, 1538 and 1541, he was again sent to France. in early 1538, he was present at the Schmalkaldic League's conference at Braunschweig. In April 1544, he participated in the negotiations of the Treaty of Ghent. In 1544, he participated in the negotiation of the Treaty of Speyer. He was appointed as a member of the Privy Council of Denmark in 1546 or earlier.

== Property ==
Svave was granted Gjorslev on the Stevns Peninsula for life in 1537 and as free property in 1740.

== Personal life ==
Svave married Else Skave (died c. 1563), a daughter of Maurids Skave (died 1532) and Elline Steensdatter Bille (død 1559). They ha one daughter, Elsebe Pedersdatter Svave, who married Vincens Juel. Svave died on 16 March 1552 and is buried in Holtug Church.
