= Holtug Church =

Church building in Stevns Municipality, Denmark

Coordinates: 55.3449°N 12.4054°E

- Holtug Kirke
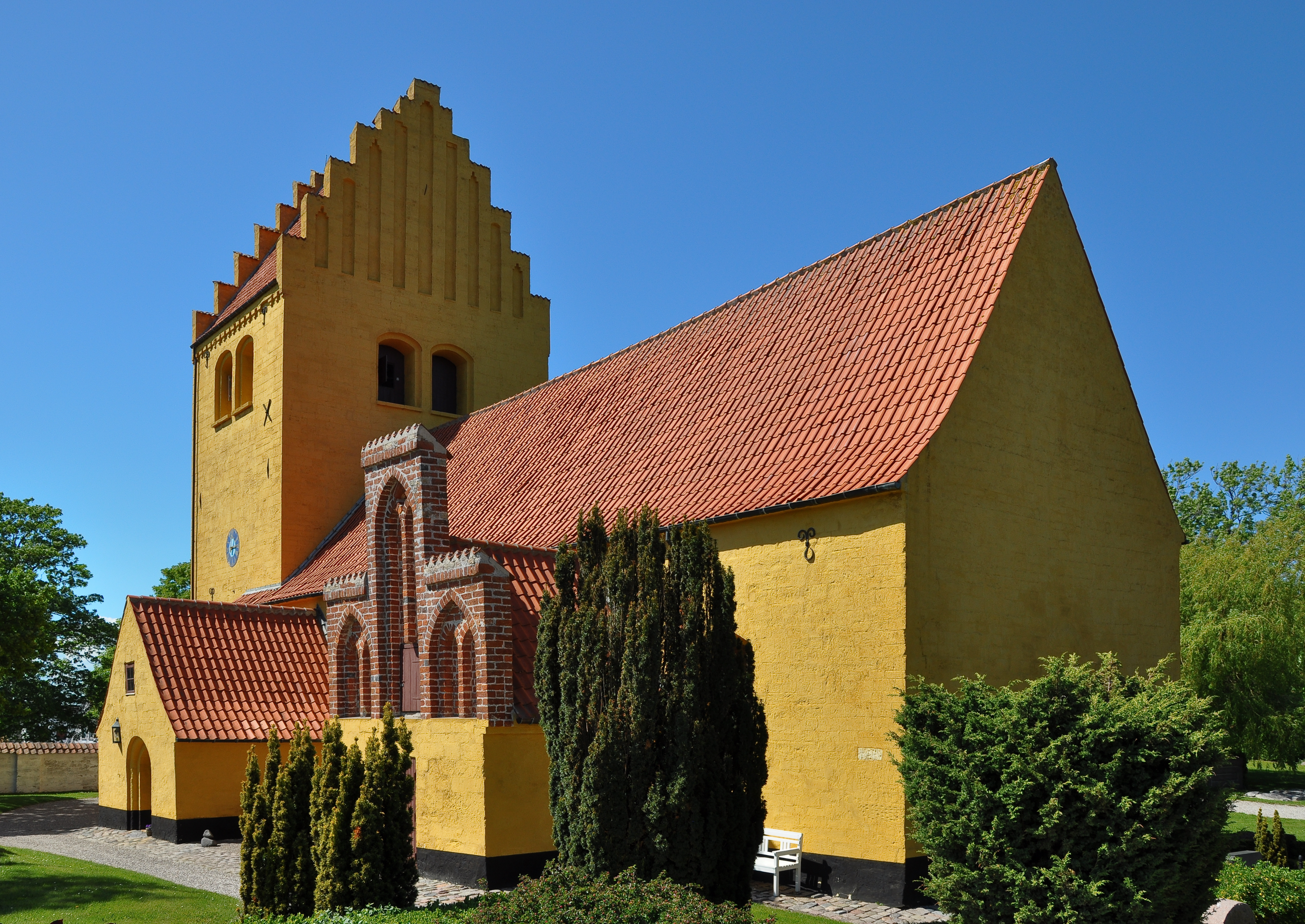
- Holtug Church
- Location: Holtug, Denmark
- Denomination: Church of Denmark

Architecture
- Architectural type: Romanesque style
- Years built: c. 1150

Administration
- Diocese: Diocese of Roskilde
- Parish: Holtug Sogn

Holtug Church (Danish: Holtug Kirke) is a church in Holtug on the Stevns Peninsula, Stevns Municipality, Denmark. The church dates from the middle of the 12th century, but only the walls of the nave from the original Romanesque church have survived.

== History ==
The church was constructed from limestone ashlars in the Romanesque style around 1150. In the 15th century, the chancel was replaced with a newer and larger one. A limestone ashlar from the original chancel, which was reused in the south wall of the new one, features the runal inscription Tirad rist ("Tirad wrote [this]"). The tower was added between 1500 and 1525, and the porch from around 1600.

== Interior and furnishings ==
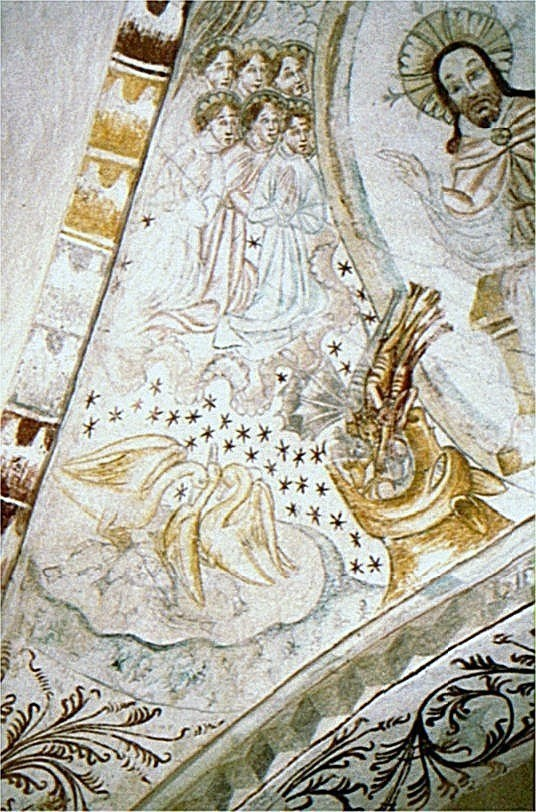
Fresco

The western cross vault features murals attributed to the so-called Høvelse Master.

The altarpiece is from 1821 and was painted by J.L. Lund. The font was returned to the church in connection with a restoration in 1984. The pulpit is from c. 1825 and is made of wood. In 1946, it was decorated with paintings of the Evangelists and Paul by Erik Petersen. The organ is a Ramus organ from 1861 and was expanded by Starup in 1932.

== Cemetery ==
The church is surrounded by a cemetery. Notable burials include:

- Jacob Brønnum Scavenius (1749–1820), landowner
- Peder Brønnum Scavenius (1795–1868), landowner and politician
- Jacob Scavenius (1838–1915), landowner and politician
- Harald Scavenius (1873–1939), diplomat and Minister of Foreign Affairs
