= Rane Jonsen =

Danish esquire and camerarius

Rane Jonsen (died 1294) was a Danish esquire and camerarius, known for his role in the murder of Eric V of Denmark. He is mentioned in a traditional Medieval ballad as the traitor "warding his master with deceit". He owned Gjorslev Manor on the Stevns Peninsula.

== Biography ==
Jonsen was born to Jon Ranesen og Elisabeth (daughter of Niels Falster). The family, which was later referred to as the Rane family, had close ties to the Hvide family. The historian Arild Huitfeldt (1546-1609) mentions him as the owner of Gjorselv Manor, but without mentioning his sources. He is only sparsely mentioned in contemporary sources. He was squire at the time of the murder of king Eric V and seems also briefly to have served as his Jonsen camerarius.

He participated in attacks on Denmark by Stig Andersen Hvide and other outlaws, circa 1289. He was in court for trial during 1294 and placed on the breaking wheel outside Roskilde.
