= Just Høg =

Danish statesman and landowner

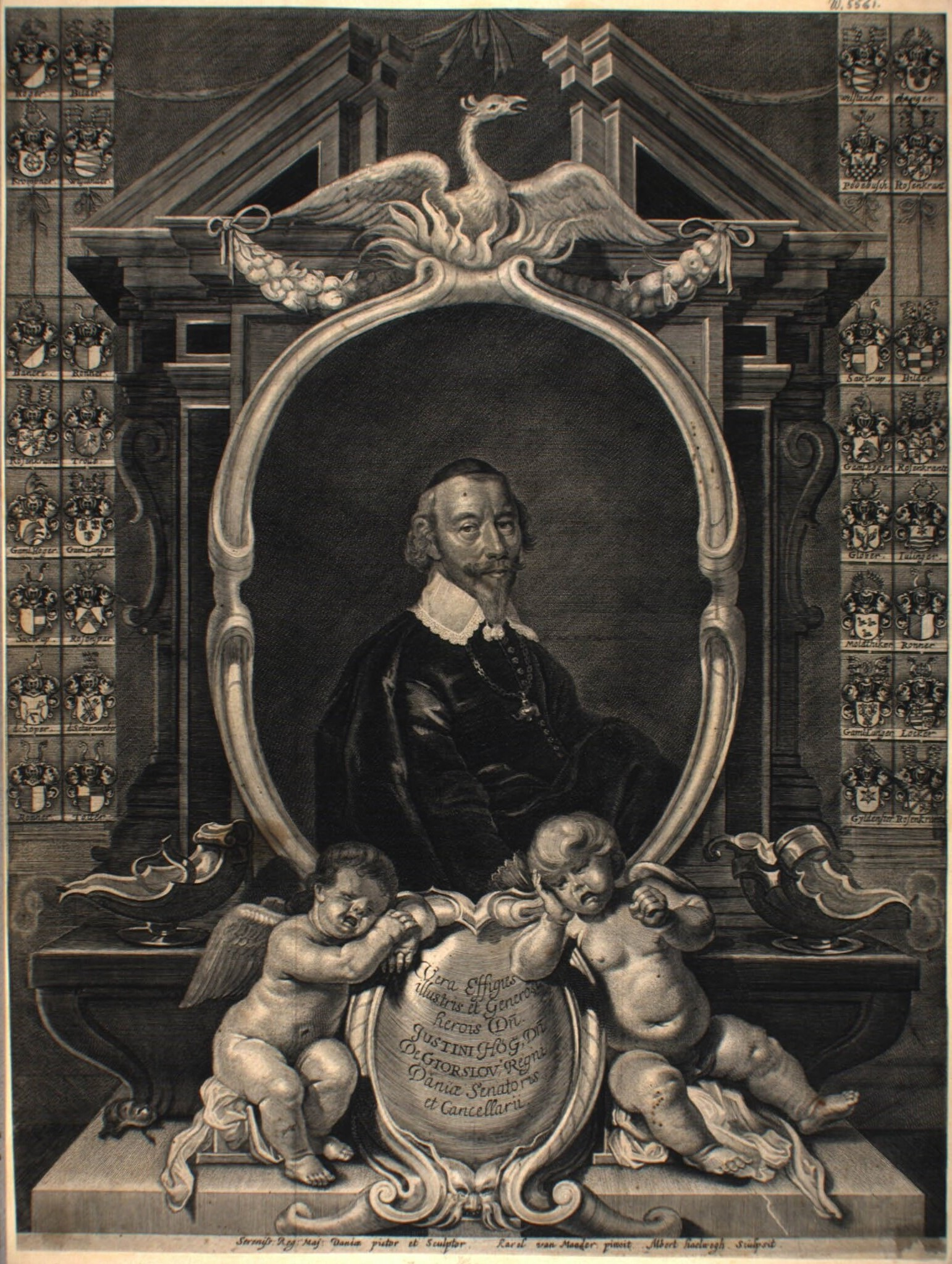
- Just Høg on a posthumous copperplate engraving

Chancellor of the Realm
- In office 1640–1646
- Monarch: Christian IVV
- Preceded by: Christen Thomesen Sehested
- Succeeded by: Christoffer Urne

Personal details
- Born: 8 September 1584 Vamg, Denmark
- Died: 25 May 1646 (aged 61)
- Children: Stygge Høg, Just Høg
- Awards: Knight of the Elephant

Just Høg (8 September 1584 – 25 May 1646) was a Danish statesman and landowner. He served as the first Hofmeister of Sorø Academy from 1629 to 1640 and then as Chancellor of the Realm from 1640 to 1646. He was the owner of Ghorslev Manor on Stevns.

== Early life and education ==
Høeg was born on 8 September 1584 at Vang, Nørresundby, the son of Stygge Høeg (died c. 1630) og Anne Gregersdatter Ulfstand (død 1627). He went to school in Aalborg and Aarhus and was in 1601 sent to Hamburg before studying at the universities in Wittenberg (1606), Angers (1609), Siena (1611) and Padua (1617). In 1612, he served on a Florentine eskadre against the Ottoman Navy. In 1613, he visited Constantinople, Cyprus, Rhodes and Alexandria on board a Venetian ship. He then returned to Denmark by way of Spain and England.

== Career ==
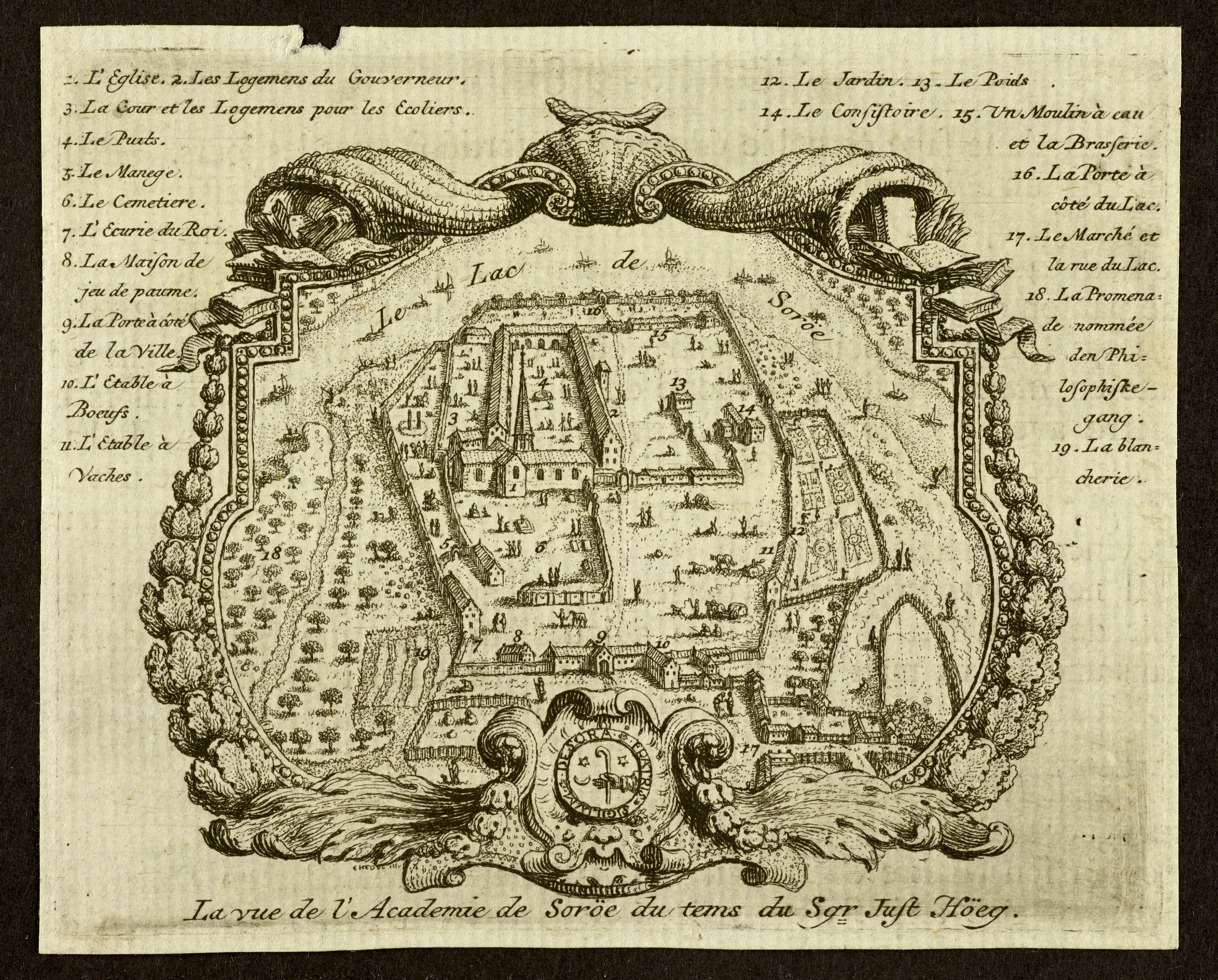
La vue de l'Academie de Soröe du tems du Sgr. Just Höeg

Høg was appointed hofjunker in 1615 and drabanthøvedsmand in 1618. He then spent a few years in Bremen after in 1519 being granted a prebend at the cathedral chapter by Christian IV, He worked for Duke John Frederick's appointment to coadjutor and Administrator successor.

In 1623, Høg was appointed as the first Hofmeister of the new Sorø Academy. The office holder was granted the archdeaconship of Roskilde (1629-). In 1627, Christian IV made him a Privy Counsellor. In 1629, he accompanied the king to his conference with Gustav Adolf at Ulfsbäck.

In 1630 and 1531, Høg acted as Chancellor of the Realm (Rigskansler) during Christen Thomesen Sehested's journeys abroad. When Thomesen was appointed as Royal Chancellor (Kongens Kansler) in 1640, Høg succeeded him as Chancellor of the Realm. Ge resigned as hoffmeister at Sorø Academy and was granted Kalø Fief as a replacement of the fiefs that his former office had been associated with. In 1643, together with Gregers Krabbe and Christopher v. d. Lippe, Høg represented Denmark-Norway at the Osnabrück Congress. In 1645, he was part of the negotiations with the British envoy.

== Property ==
Høg bought Gjorslev from Vincens Bille in 1630. He expanded the estate with land from the associated village. The smaller of the two side wings was probably constructed by him.

== Personal life ==
Høg married Anne Lunge (1 February 1610 – 6 August 1652), a daughter of rigsmarsk Jørgen Ovesen L. of Odden (1577–1619) and Sophie Brahe (1588–1659), on 9 March 1628. He was the father of Just Høg (1640–94) and Stygge Høg. He died on 25 May 1646.
