= Harald Scavenius =

Danish politician and diplomat (1873–1939)

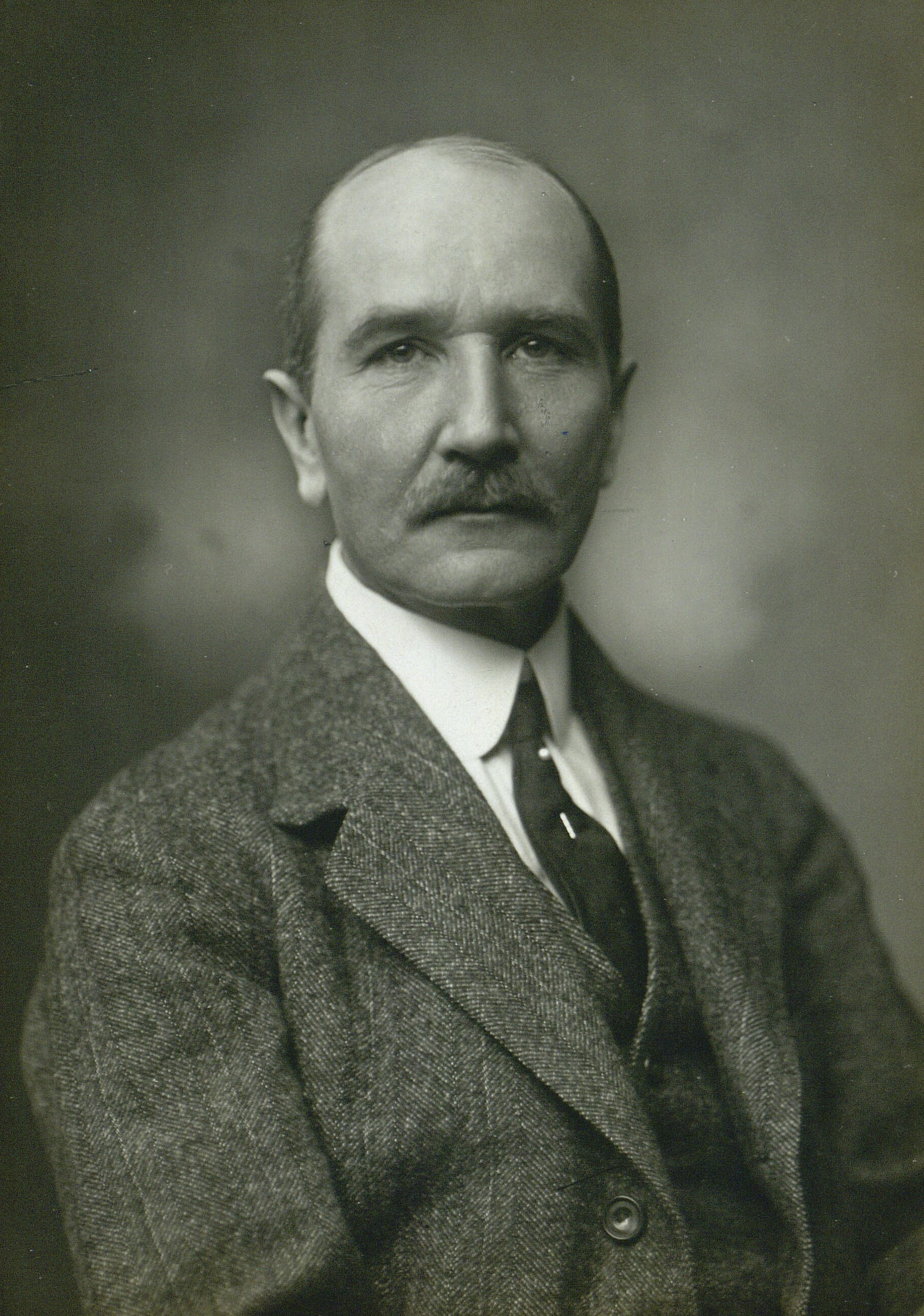

Minister of Foreign Affairs
- In office 5 May 1920 – 9 October 1922
- Prime Minister: Niels Neergaard
- Preceded by: Otto Scavenius
- Succeeded by: Christian Cold

Personal details
- Born: 27 May 1873 Gjorslev, Denmark
- Died: 24 April 1939 (aged 65) The Hague, Netherlands
- Party: Independent
- Parents: Jacob Scavenius (father); Louise Sophie Castonier (mother)

Harald Roger Erik Julius Christian de Scavenius (27 May 1873 – 24 April 1939) was Danish foreign minister from 5 May 1920 to 9 October 1922.

Before this appointment, he had previously occupied the position of Danish ambassador to Russia. Unlike his first cousin, Erik Scavenius, he advocated a strong anti-Communist policy and opposed Danish diplomatic recognition of the Soviet Union. Regarding the Schleswig issue, he advocated a minimalist strategy, arguing that Denmark should only regain areas in which Danes were in a majority, believing that any other policy of action would place Denmark in great risk of German revanchism.

Political offices
Preceded by Otto Scavenius	Foreign Minister of Denmark; 5 May 1920 – 9 October 1922	Succeeded by Christian Cold
