= Christen Lindencrone =

Danish landowner and supercargo (1703–1772)

Christen Lindencrone (24 December 1703 – 17 August 1772) was a Danish landowner and supercargo of the Danish Asia Company. He owned Gjorslev Manor on Stevns and constructed the Lindencrone Mansion (Lindencrones Palæ) on Bredgade in Copenhagen. He was ennobled in 1757 with the surname Lindencrone.

== Biography ==
He was born Christian Jensen Lintrup on 24 December 1703 in the village of Løgstør in Vesthimmerland, Denmark. His parents were Jens Christensen Lendrup (ca. 1668–1716) and Anne Povelsdatter. He participated as a second assistant on the ship Cron Printz Christian on Danish Asiatic Company's first voyage to China in 1730. By 1738 he had been promoted to 1st supercargo with responsibility of loading and purchase of goods. He had become a wealthy man by the time he completed his fifth voyage to China in 1740–1742.

== Honours ==
He was appointed counselor (kammerråd) in 1743, appointed to the Justice Council (justitsråd) in 1750 and granted the title etatsråd in 1766. He was ennobled in 1756 with the surname Lindencrone. His estate was turned into a title estate (stamhus), meaning that it could not be sold or divided between heirs.

== Property ==
After completing his last voyage to China in 1742, he purchased the three estates Gjorslev, Søholm and Erikstrup. He refurbished the neglected buildings on the estates which had been part of Tryggevælde cavalry district. He was known for treating the peasants on his estates well, introducing agricultural reforms and building schools for their children.

He constructed a town mansion in Copenhagen's new Frederiksstaden neighbourhood in 1751. It was built at the corner of Bredgade and Sankt Annæ Plads to design by the leading architect Nicolai Eigtved and with the use of limestone from his estates on Stevns.

== Personal life ==
He married Mette Holmsted (172–-1793) on 7 November 1742 in the Church of Holmen in Copenhagen. She was a daughter of the mayor of Copenhagen Frederik Holmsted (1683–1758) and his wife Anna Martha Holmsted née Brinck (c. 1696–1758).
