= Frederik Christian Raben =

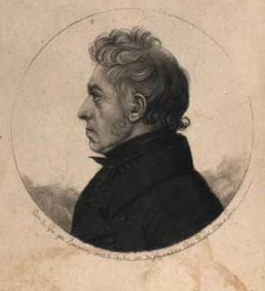
Frederik Christian Raben

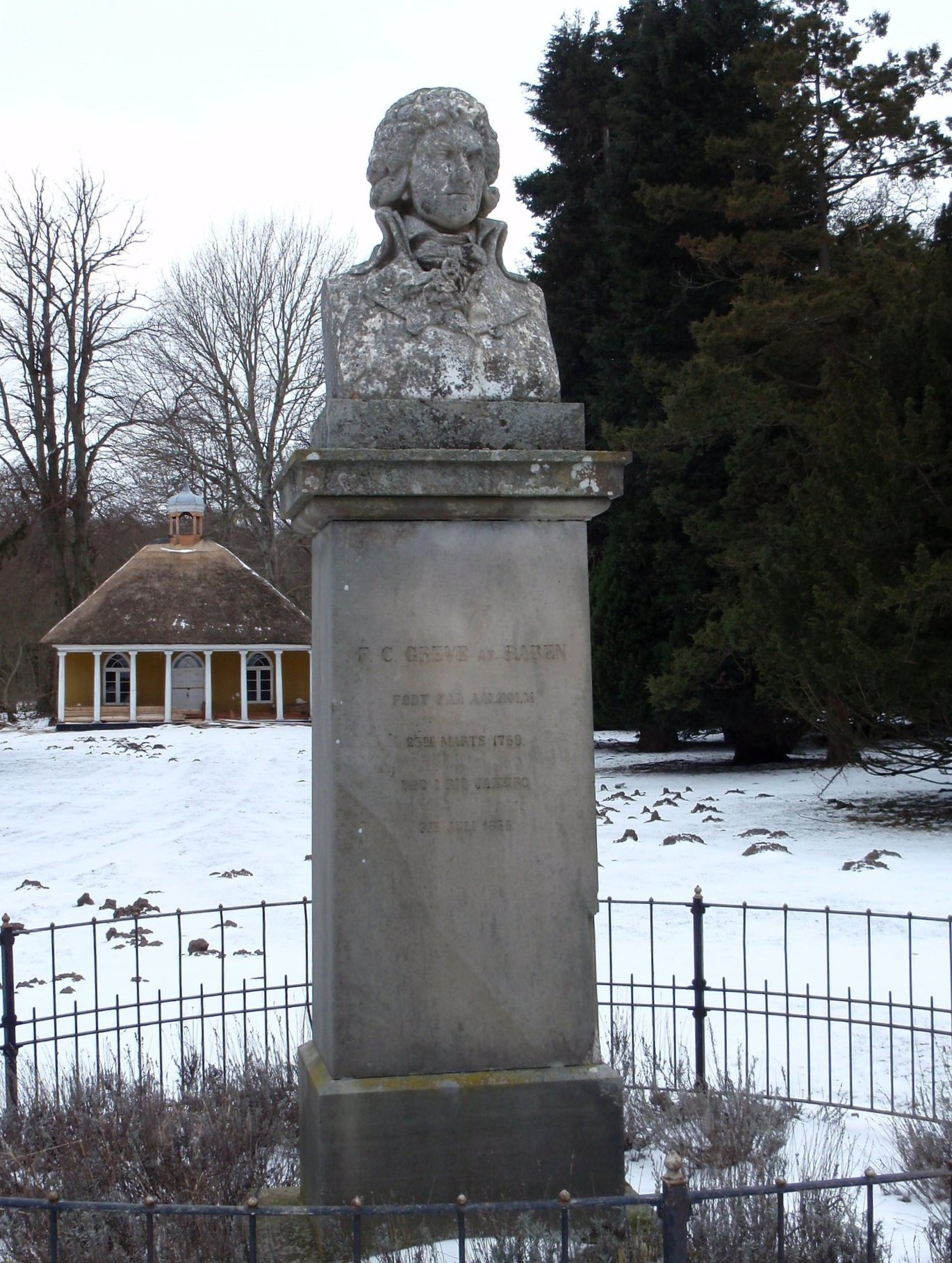
Bust of Frederik Christian Raben in the garden of Ålholm Estate

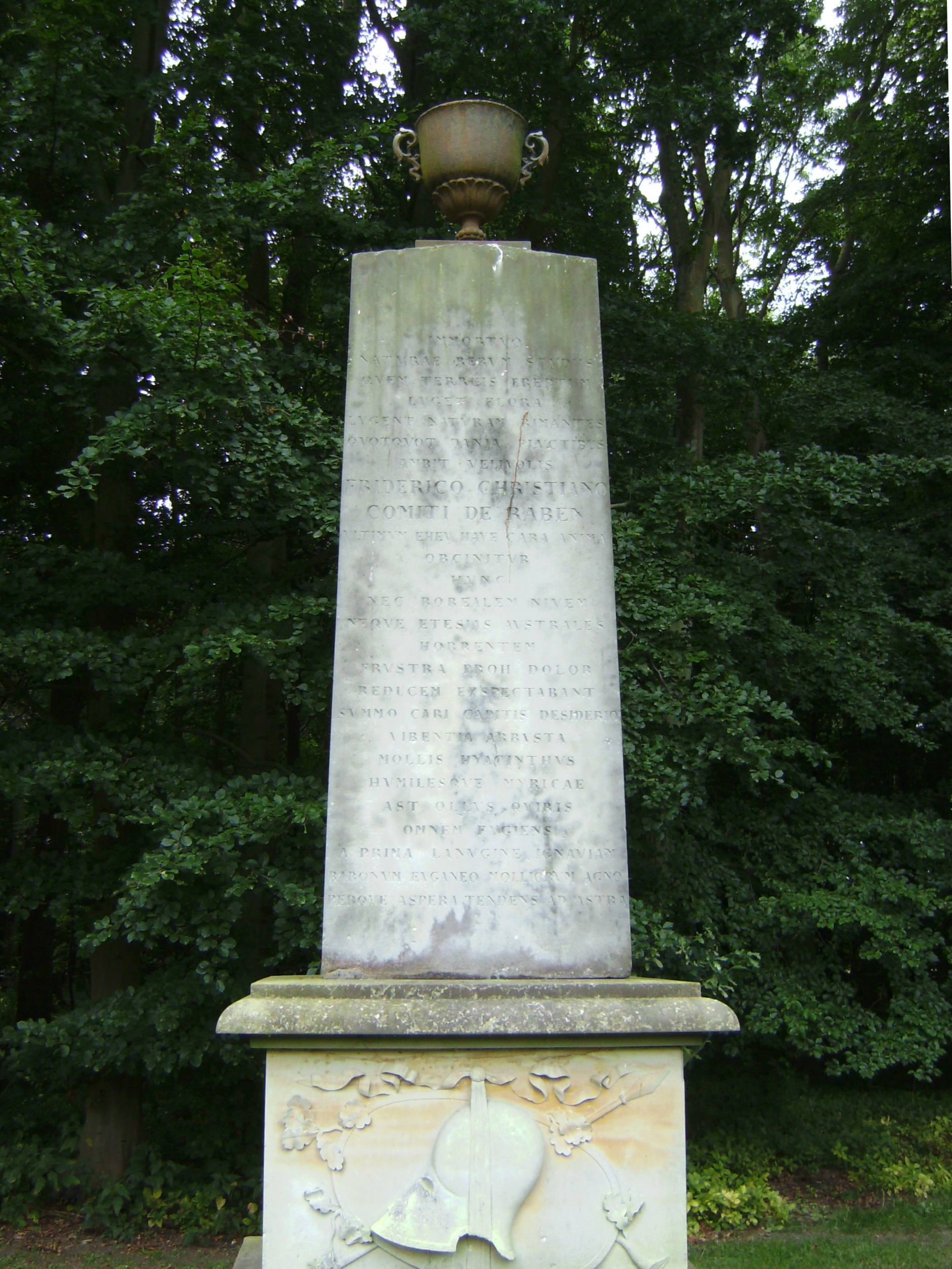
Memorial for Frederik Christian Raben, erected by his son Gregers Christian Raben

Frederik Christian Raben (23 March 1769 – 6 July 1838) was a Danish count, traveller and amateur naturalist. He owned Aalholm Castle on Lolland as well as the Lindencrone Mansion in Copenhagen.

== Early life ==
Frederik Christian Raben was born at Aalholm Castle in 1769 as the son of Otto Ludvig Raben, 2nd Count of Christiansholm. He graduated in law from the University of Copenhagen in 1788 and inherited the family estate when he was 21 years old.

== Travels ==
F. C. Raben was the owner of the estate Christiansholm (now "Ålholm") on Lolland and amateur botanist. He travelled in Europe and, unusual for his time, to Greenland and Brazil (1835-1838). He collected many plant specimens during his journey to Brazil. More than 1100 of his herbarium specimens now belong to the Botanical Museum at the University of Copenhagen.

== Raben's great auk ==
Raben brought a specimen of the now extinct great auk back from Iceland in 1821. In 1968, a descendant of his, Baron Raben-Levetzau to Ålholm, put it on auction at Sotheby's in London. The highest bid - £ 9,000 - was given by Finnur Gudmunsson, then director of the Icelandic Natural History Museum. This is the highest price ever paid for a zoological specimen.

== Legacy ==
A number of plant species have been named in his honour, particularly based on his own Brazilian collections, e.g. Miconia rabenii (Melastomaceae), Eleocharis rabenii (Cyperaceae) and Campomanesia rabeniana (Myrtaceae).

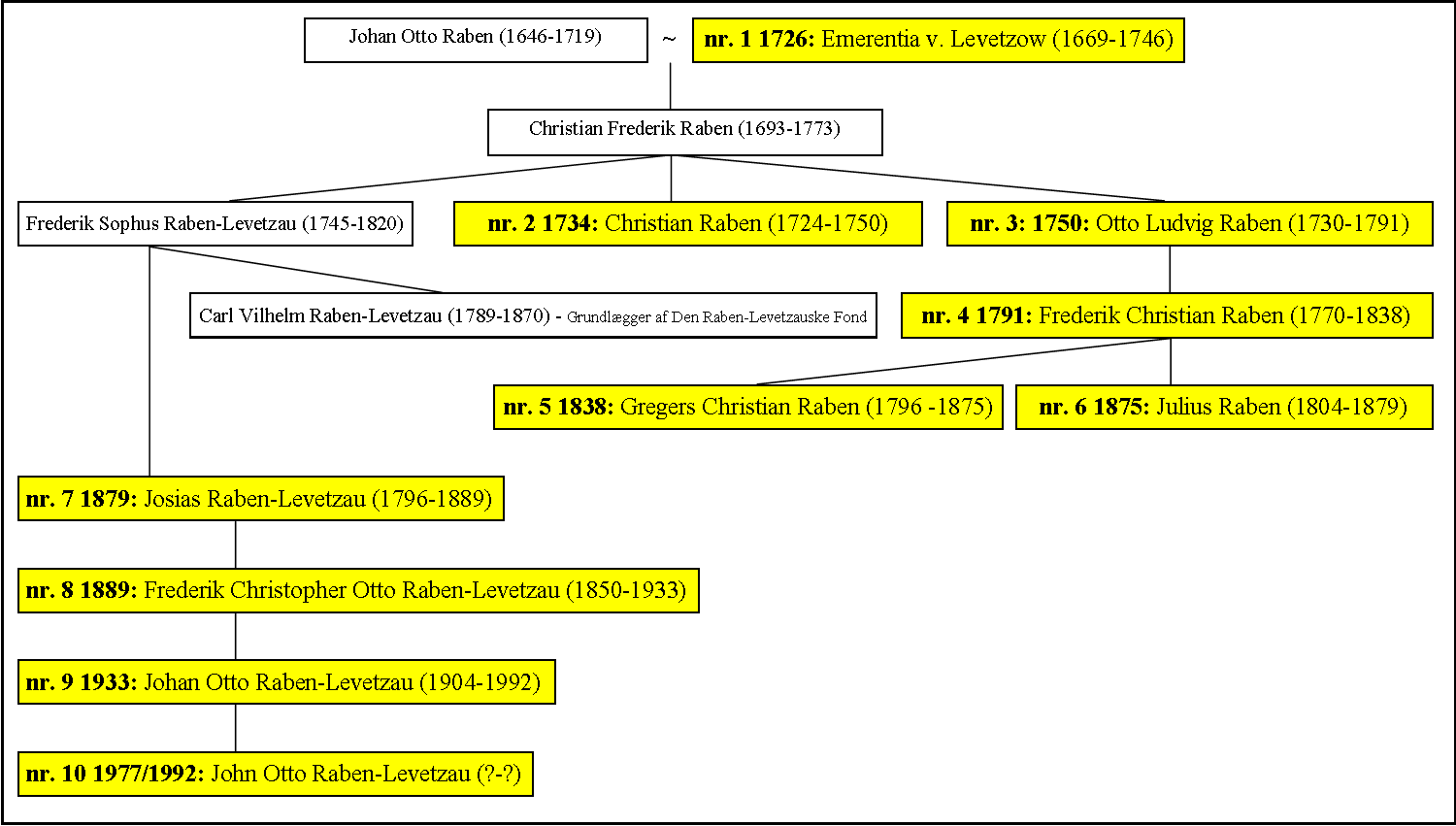
The Families Raben og Raben-Levezau of Ålholm

== Ancestry ==
Ancestors of Frederik Christian Raben

16. Victor von Raben
8. Johan Otto Raben
17. Sophie Hedevig von Walschleben, zur Stück
4. Christian Frederik Raben
18. Hans Frederik von Levetzow
9. Emerentia von Levetzow
19. Lucia Emerentia von Brockdorff
2. Otto Ludvig von Raben
20. Christian Siegfried von Plessen
10. Christian Ludvig von Plessen
21. Sophie Agnes von Lepel
5. Berte Scheel von Plessen
22. Mogens Skeel
11. Charlotte Amalie Skeel
23. Helle Helene Baronesse Rosenkrantz
1. Frederik Christian Raben
24. Caspar von Buchwald
12. Henning Buchwald
25. Magdalene von Buchwald
6. Friederich Christian von Buchwald
26. Hans Rantzau
13. Magdalene Blome
27. Birgitte von Buchwald
3. Anna Catharina Buchwaldt
28. Asmus Rumohr
14. Ditlev von Rumohr
29. Dorothea von Ahlefeldt
7. Margrethe Dorothea Dorethea Rumohr
30. Vilhelm Von von Ahlefeldt
15. Ida Emerentia Rumohr
31. Anna Emerentia Rumohr
