= Jacob Brønnum Scavenius =

Danish landowner (1749–1820)

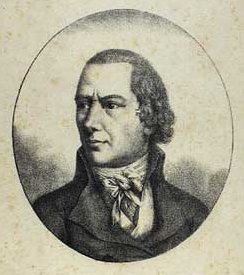
Jacob Brønnum Scavenius

Jacob Brønnum Scavenius (2 April 1749 – 20 June 1820) was a Danish landowner.

== Early life and career ==
Scavenius was born in Skagen in 1749 as the 9th of 11 children of merchant Peder Christensen Brønnum (or Brøndum) and Anne Ibsdatter. He graduated from Aalborg Grammar School in 1770 and assumed the name Scavenius (a latinification of Skagbo 'person from Skagen').

Scavenius was a volunteer in Rentekammeret (the treasury) until 1776 when he was employed as an assistant for the Danish Asiatic Company in India. He returned to Denmark as a wealthy man in 1792 after spending 15 years in Bengal.

== Property and titles ==
Scavenius purchased Gjorslev, Erikstrup and Søholm on Stevns from the Lindencrone family in 1793. In 1798 he also purchased Klintholm on the island of Møn. He made a turn-around on Gjorslev and established a chalk plant at Bøgeskov.

He was appointed to justitsråd in 1793 and etatsråd in 1711. He created a large collection of books but much of it was lost in the fire of Christiansborg Palace in 1794 as well as in a fire caused by the British bombardment of Copenhagen in 1807.

== Personal life ==
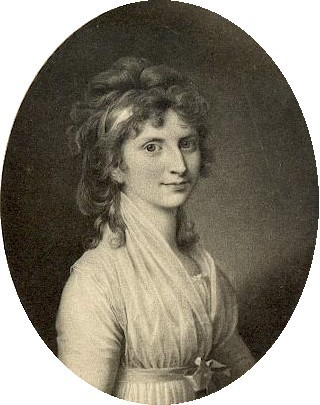
Karine Lucie Debes

He married Karine Lucie Debes (1775–1825) in 1794. She was a daughter of Supreme Court justice Lucas Debes and Christine née Suhr. Two sons died young. Their daughter Jacobine married headmaster at Sorø Academy, Hector Estrup, and became the mother of later prime minister Jacob Brønnum Scavenius Estrup.

Scavenius died at Gjorslev on 20 June 1820 and is buried at Holtug Cemetery.
