= Aalholm =

Manor house in Guldborgsund Municipality, Denmark

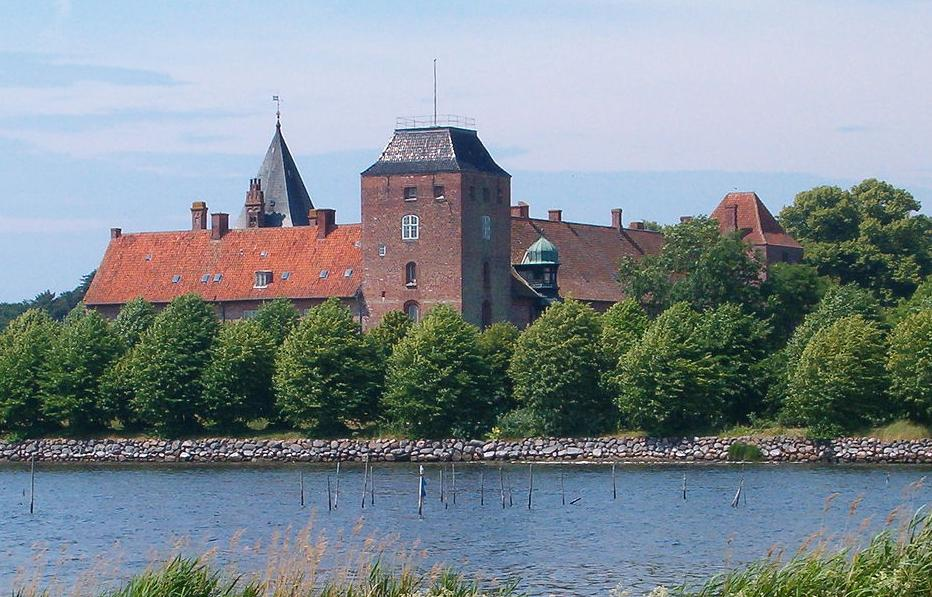
- Aalholm
- Interactive map of the Aalholm area

General information
- Location: Nysted rural parish, Guldborgsund Municipality, Region Zealand, Denmark
- Coordinates: 54°39′52″N 11°43′25″E
- Construction started: 1300-1585
- Renovated: 1768

Aalholm, also Aalholm Castle (Danish: Aalholm Slot), is a castle and country estate in Nysted in the municipality of Guldborgsund, on the south coast of the island of Lolland, Denmark. It is the oldest castle on the island, first mentioned in 1329. The main building was built in 1300–1585, with major rebuilding especially in 1768 and in 1889 under Hans Jørgen Holm and Gotfred Tvede. Inscriptions in the building show that it was originally completed in 1585.

== History ==
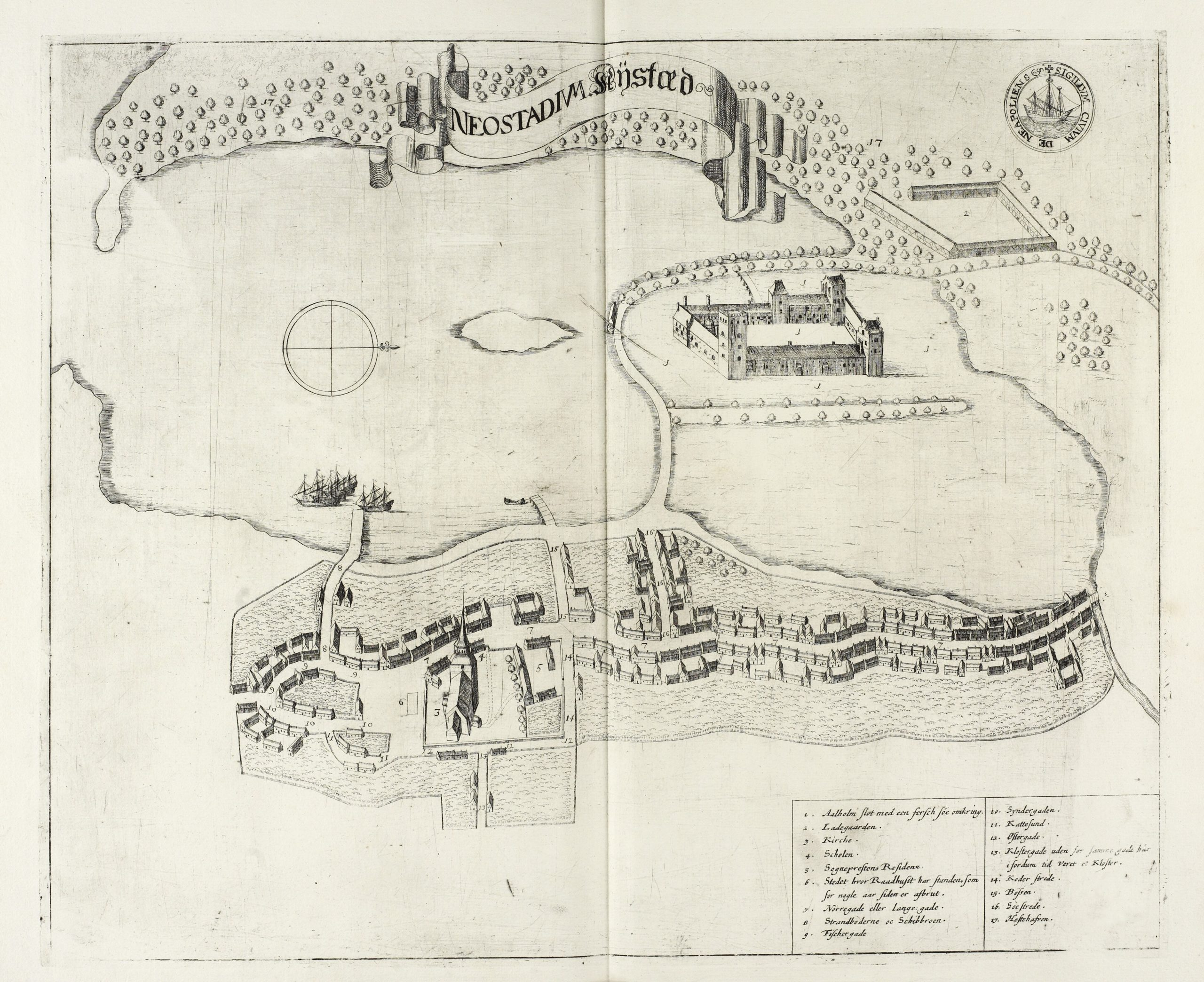
Plan of Aalholm Castle.

The castle was initially the seat of the king's vassal or lensmand, and thus the centre of local government. It is not known when the castle was founded, but for historical reasons, it was probably around 1200. During this period, a number of royal castles were built across the country to strengthen the king's power in the regions and guard against attack. They include Koldinghus, Riberhus, Copenhagen Castle, Næsbyhoved Castle near Odense, Sønderborg and Nordborg on the island of Als, Tårnborg near Korsør, Nyborg, Gurre Castle and Søborg in the north of Zealand, Ravnsborg in northern Lolland and many more.

Aalholm was located on a very favorable site, standing on a little island in the inlet known as Nysted Nor. Completely surrounded by water, it was protected from the open sea although ships of all kinds could sail right up to the island, provided they had crews conversant with the channel to be followed. Not far to the north and west, there was fertile land where produce could be grown for the castle, with a surplus for the vassal and the king. Moreover, Nysted Nor was the only suitable site for a building of the kind between Nakskov in the west of Lolland and Stubbekøbing in the northeast of Falster.

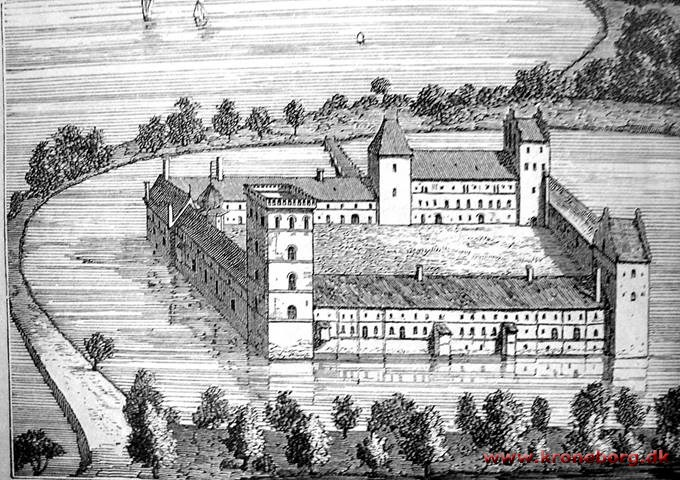
Aalholm after Peder Hansen Resens copperplate engraving from 1677.

The importance of the area at the time can also be appreciated from the fact that the Franciscan monastery in Nysted, built in 1286, was the only one on the islands, especially as the Franciscans always settled in thriving, populated areas where they could rely on the support of the inhabitants.

The king's castles which were spread across the country were run by vassals who were responsible for defending the area and either had to provide the king with produce or lend him money in return for the revenues they received. In many cases, however, the vassals appointed a representative to run the castle and its district as they often owned farms elsewhere in the country and were also required to fight in the king's wars.

We know a number of Aalholm's vassals, many of them members of the Danish nobility. Later, some of them stemmed from Mecklenburg or Holstein, simply acting in as officials. In certain periods, the kings would allow their widowed mothers to enjoy the benefits of the castles, providing them with a pension.

=== Aalholm Amt ===
After Frederik III's coup establishing an autocratic regime in Denmark, the feudal approach was abolished. Aalholm became an amt or county with an administration consisting of civil servants. These officers did not necessarily live at Aalholm. Some lived in their own homes, some in nearby Nykøbing. In 1660—11661, Ph. Barsdorff served as county governor of Aalholm. In 661—1685, Aalholm was administrated by the queen. In 1672—1722, it was administrated by the diosesan governor of Lolland-Falaster. In 1685—1735, Jørgen Ernst von Reichou served as county governor of Aalholm. From 1735, it was again administrated by the diocesan governor of Lolland-Falster.

=== Raben family, 1725–1768 ===
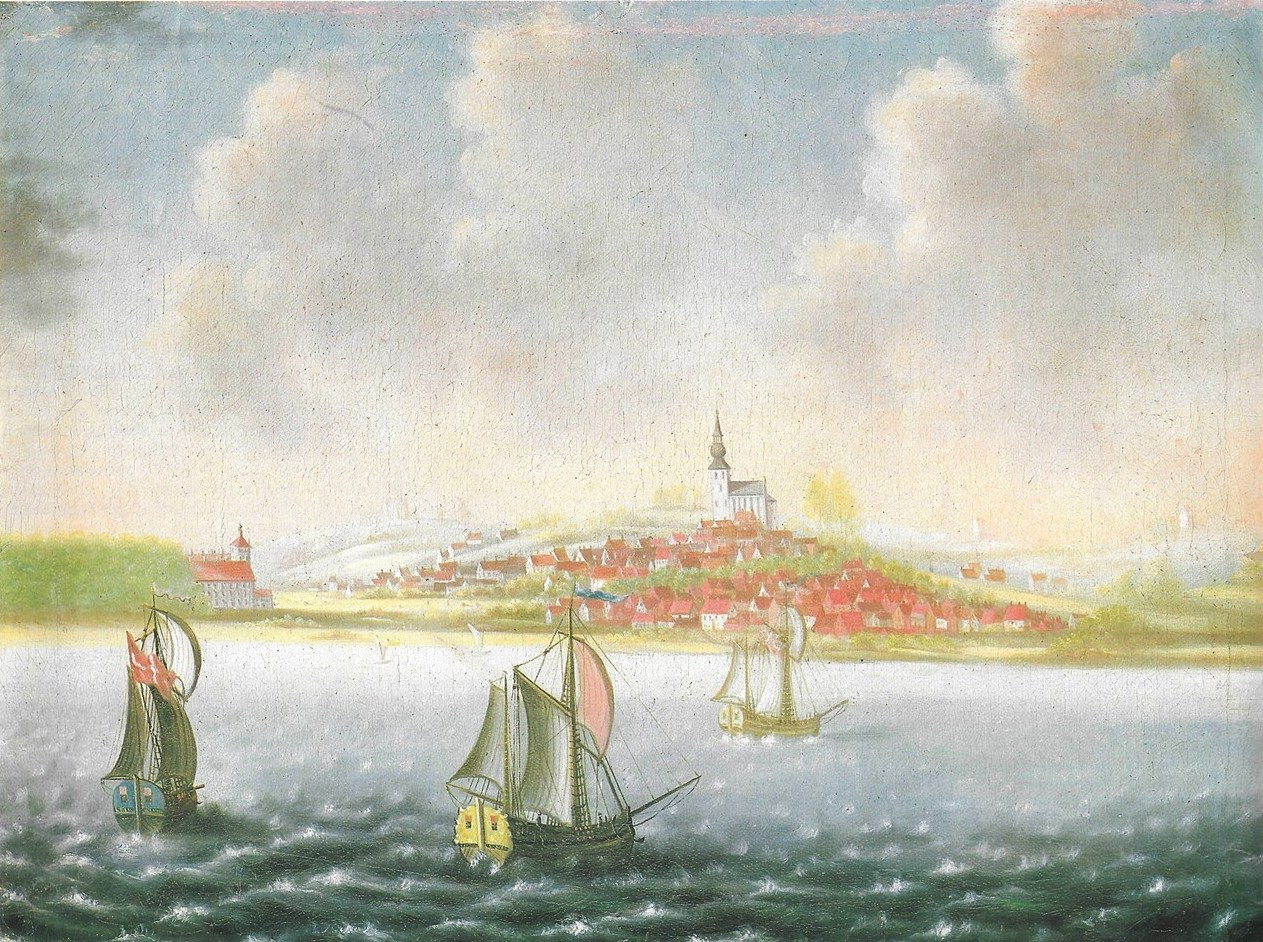
Aalholm and Nysted view from the west on a print by Johan Jacob Bruun, 1854.

In 1725, Emerentia von Raben (née Levetzow) bought the estate. She was the widow of Johan Otto Raben. She became one of the largest landowners on Lolland. Her other holdings included Bramsløkke and Kjærstrup. Prior to her death, by testament in 1734, she was able to establish the countship of Christiansholm for her grandson, Christian Raben (1724-1750).

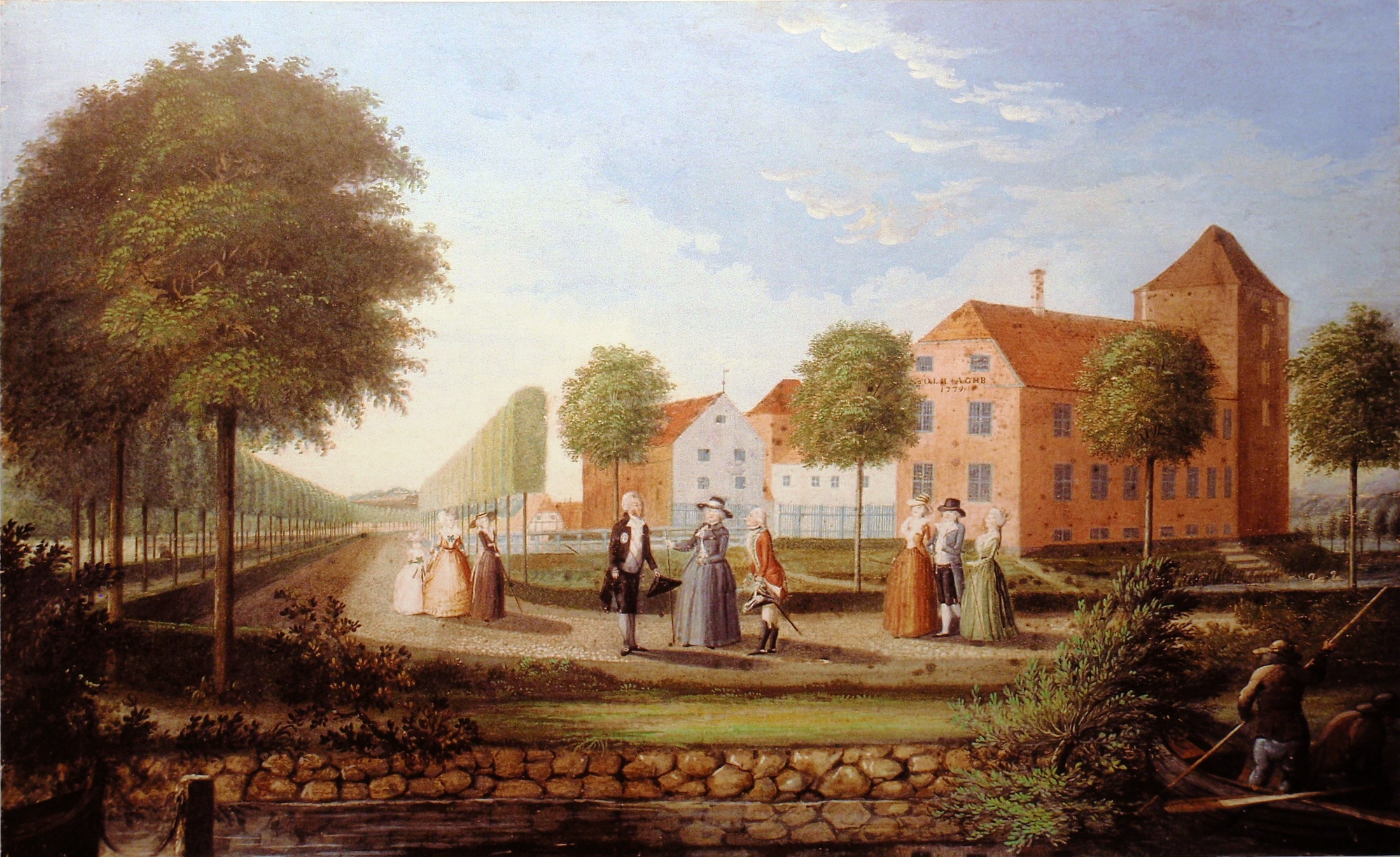
Aalholm Castle.

Christian Raben died without issue just 25 years old. He was therefore succeeded by his younger brother Otto Ludvig Raben (1729 - 1791) to the countship of Christiansholm.Otto Ludvig Raben expanded the estate through the acquisition of more land. He also established a starch and face powder factory on the estate. Otto Ludvig Taben was succeeded by his son Frederik Christian Raben. He created an astronomical observatory in the building. Frederik Christian Rabens died in 1838. He was succeeded by his sons, Gregers Christian Raben and Julius Raben, who both died without issue.

=== Raben-Levetzau, 1879–1995 ===
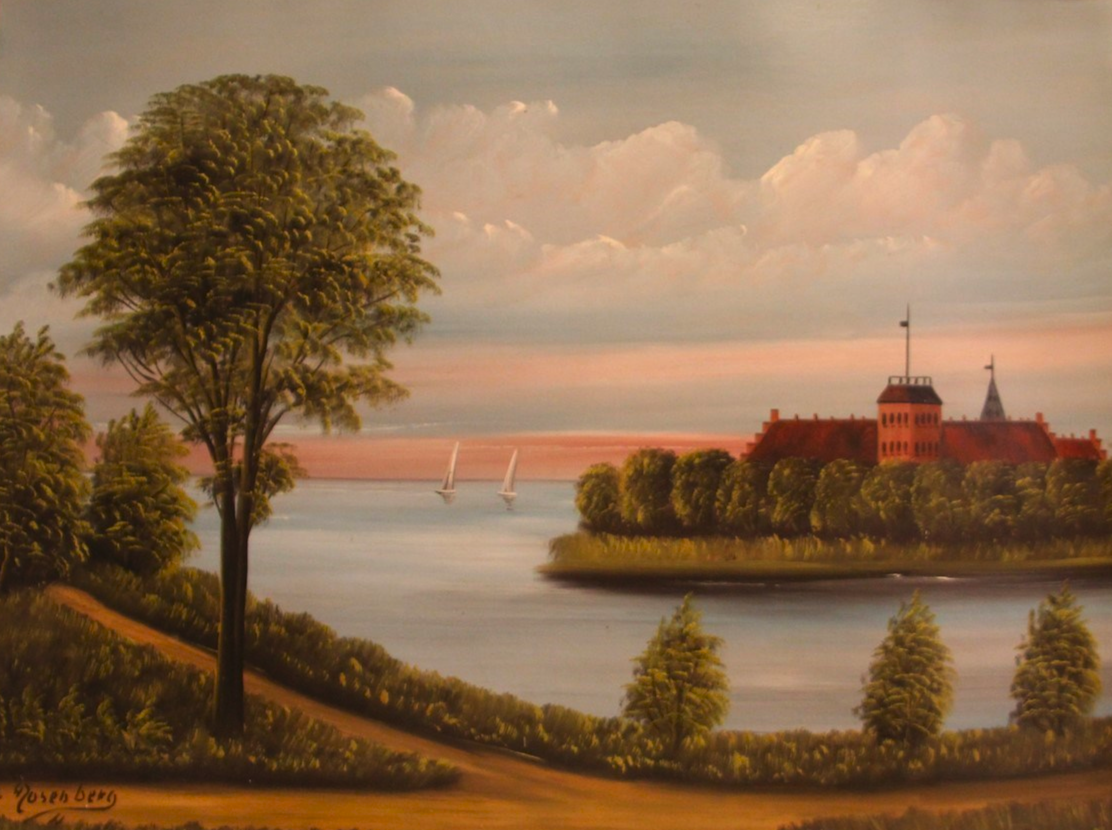
Aalholm Castle.

Julius Raben was not survived by any male descendents of the previous Raben ovners of the estate. Christians )with Aalholm) was therefore passed to a descendent of Emerentia von Raben née Levetzow's brother, Josias Levetzau, who adopted the namke Raben-Levetzau.

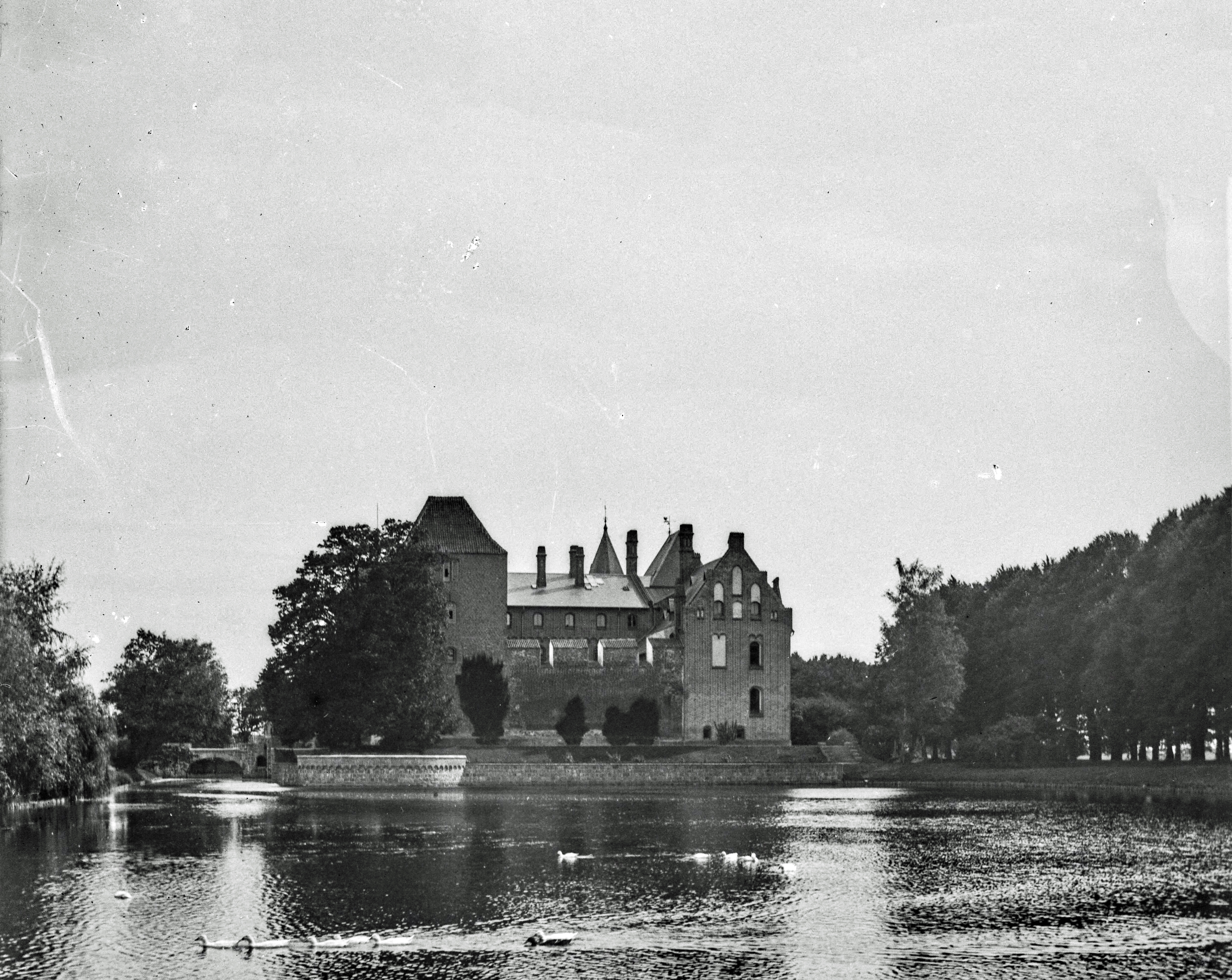
Aalholm in c. 1990.

In 1889, he was succeeded by his son Frederik Christopher Otto Raben-Levetzau. After Frederik Christopher Otto Raben's in 1933, Aalholm was passed to his son Johan Otto von Raben-Levetzau, In the 1970s, parts of the castle were opened by the then Baroness Elizabeth Raben Levetzau (Gray) to the public as a museum, while the former owner established a vintage car museum of about 350 vehicles on Stubberup Farm about one kilometer to the west of the castle.

=== Later history ===
In 1995, Aalholm was sold to Stig Hussted-Andersen. In connection with the sale of the castle and estate in 1995, all the furnishings were auctioned off while the new owner took over the automobile museum. The museum was closed in 2008 owing to the poor state of the buildings. The cars were sold by RM Auctions on August 12, 2012, realizing sales of 10.2 million Euros.

== Architecture ==
It is impossible to trace the early history of the castle as there are no written sources and any archaeological evidence is hidden beneath today's building. The castle has been built and rebuilt even since it was founded. The oldest part of the existing building is the north wing, thought to date from the 14th and 15th centuries. Thereafter, there is plenty of documentation on restoration and refurbishment, sometimes also revealing the poor state of the building. For example, in the 1550s, bricks from the Franciscan monastery were used to repair the castle while after the Swedish Wars of 1657-1660, the building had no windows and the towers no roofs. In the 18th century, parts of the south wing were demolished and the east wing was fully renovated. In 1889, a further section of the south wing was pulled down and two new lateral wings were added on the south side of the north wing. As a result, the once rectangular structure now took on a shape resembling a pair of spectacles. Since then there have been no significant changes to the castle's exterior.

== Surroundings ==
Early on, possibly from the outset, there was an access causeway from Søstræde and Slotsgade in Nysted. It traced an S-shaped course to the south of the castle, possibly all the way to the opposite bank where the castle's farm buildings once stood. Beside the south wing, there was a bridge to the dam. As time went by, groundfilling works were undertaken and in 1796 a small garden was added on the west side of the castle. In 1814 and during the 1830s, a large park-like facility was built in Hestehave Woods southwest of the farm. At some point, maybe in the 1890s, a walled garden with greenhouses and a water tower was added west of the castle.

To the north of the lake which formed after the dam was built there is now a road, No. 283 from Nysted to Sakskøbing and Rodby. It was built over rather swampy ground but it is unclear exactly when. Although it appears on a map from 1807, it is probably older. In connection with the change of ownership in 1889, the dam south of the castle was closed to the public and a new smaller dam was built on the north side in order to provide additional land. Part of the lake to the north of the new dam was drained and used for cattle. After the pumps were turned off in 2008, the area has once again become a shallow lake.

== Owners of Aalholm ==
- (1329–1725) The Crown
- (1725–1734) Emerentia von Levetzow, married name Raben
- (1734–1750) Christian Raben
- (1750–1791) Otto Ludvig Raben
- (1791–1838) Frederik Christian Raben
- (1838–1875) Gregers Christian Raben
- (1875–1879) Julius Raben
- (1879–1889) Josias Raben-Levetzau
- (1889–1933) Frederik Raben-Levetzau
- (1933–1977) Johan Otto Valdemar Raben-Levetzau
- (1977–1992) Johan Otto Valdemar baron Raben-Levetzau / John Otto Raben-Levetzau
- (1992–1995) John Otto Raben-Levetzau
- (1995–2008) Stig Husted-Andersen
- (2008–2009) Stig Husted-Andersen's estate
- (2009–2019) Estate after Stig Husted-Andersen
- (2019-) Bo Ladegaard Bendtsen
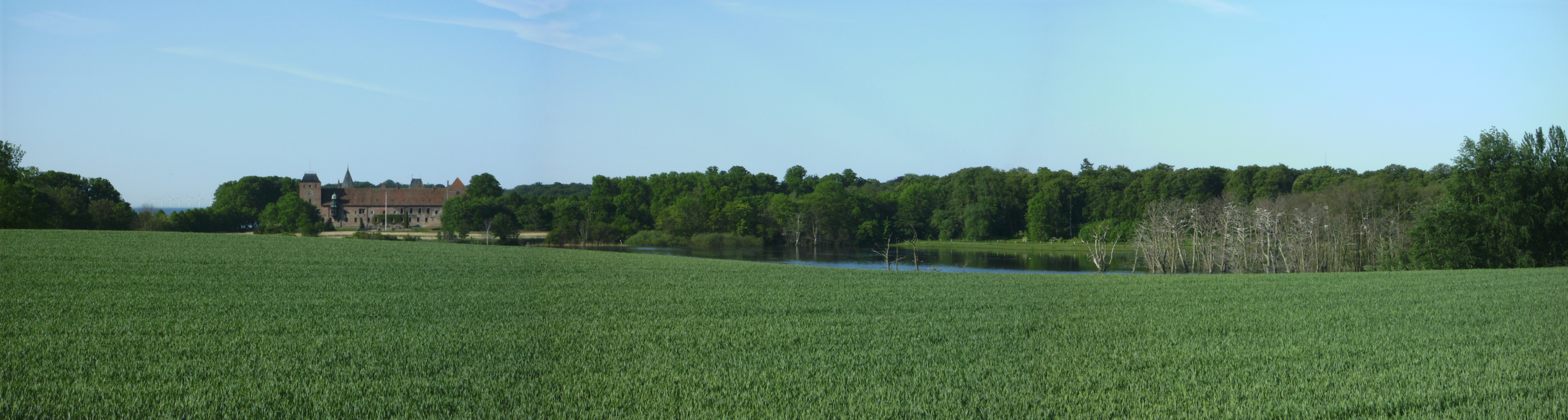
Aalholm seen from the road from north to south
