= Gjorslev =

Cruciform medieval castle in Denmark

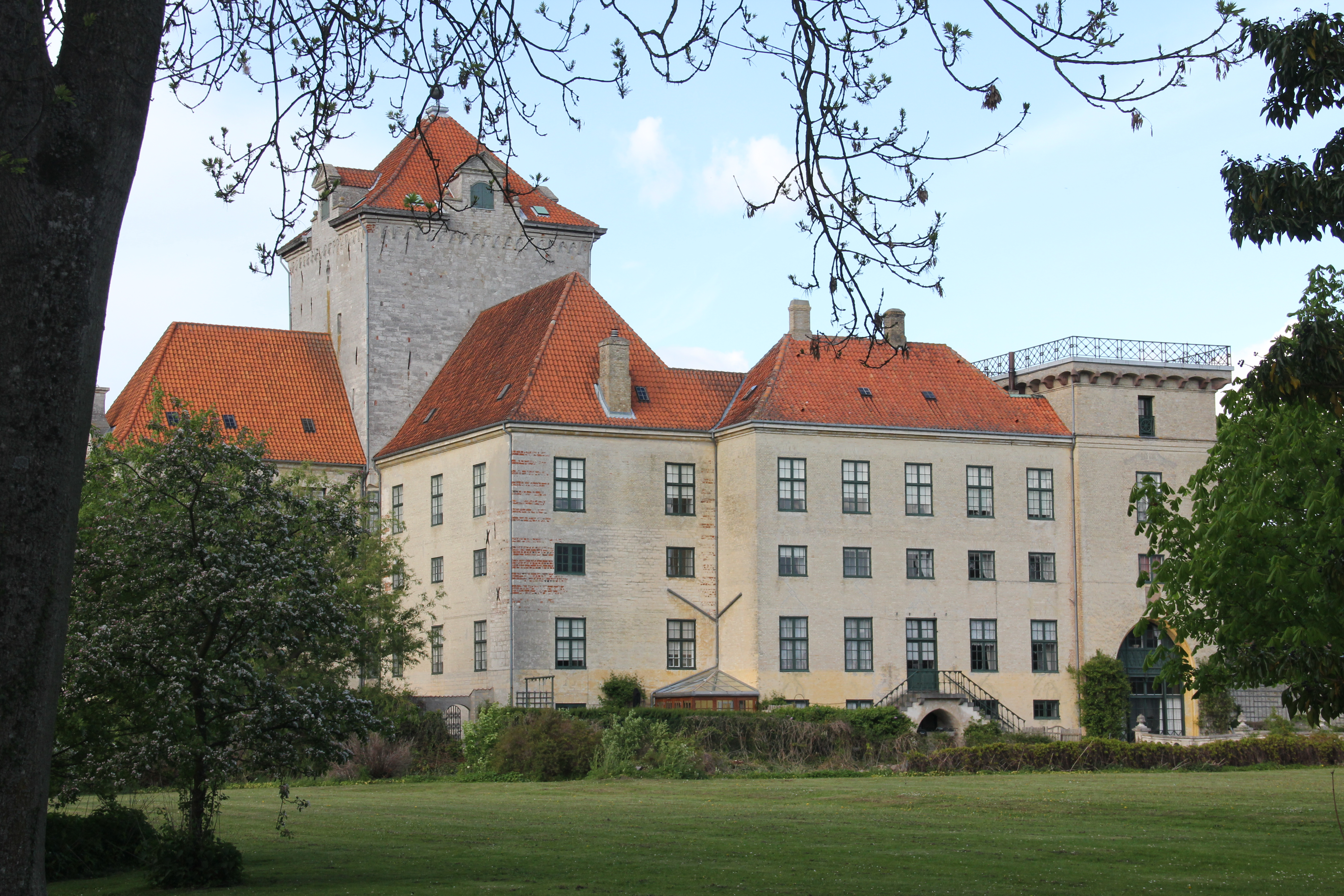
- Gjorslev
- Interactive map of the Gjorslev area

General information
- Architectural style: Gothic, Baroque
- Location: Stevns Municipality, Denmark
- Coordinates: 55.3545°N 12.3779°E
- Construction started: 1400
- Completed: 1588
- Client: Peder Jensen Lodehat

Gjorslev is a cruciform medieval castle located 17 km south-east of Køge, on the Stevns Peninsula, Stevns Municipality, some forty kilometres south of Copenhagen, Denmark. Originally owned by the Bishop of Roskilde, it is considered one of the most well-preserved examples of Gothic secular architecture in Denmark.

== History ==
=== Early history ===
Gjorslev was built in about 1400 by Peder Jensen Lodehat, Bishop of Roskilde. It remained in the possession of the Roskilde bishops until the Reformation which led to its confiscation in 1537. It was sold in 1540 and was then in the possession of changing owners until 1678 when it came under the Crown once again.

=== Lindencrone ===
In 1743, Christen Lindencrone purchased the estate. He had made a fortune as a supercargo on ships owned by the Danish Asiatic Company. In 1756, he was raised to the peerage under the name Lindencrone. He also constructed the Lindencrone Mansion at the corner of Sankt Annæ Plads and Bredgade in Copenhagen. Limestone from his estate on Stevns was used in the construction of his town mansion.

The Gjorslev estate was after Lindencrone's death passed to his son Johan Frederik Lindencrone.

=== Scavenius family ===
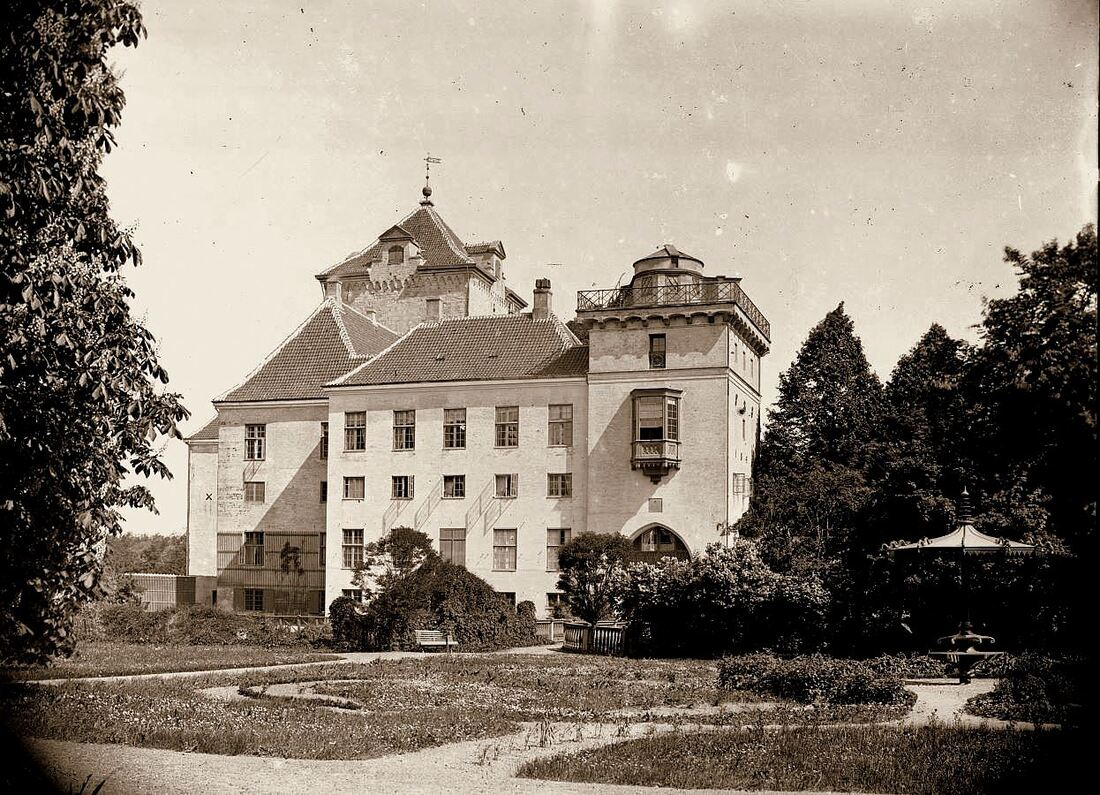
Gjorslev

In 1793, Jacob Brønnum Scavenius purchased the estate. His widow kept the estate for five years after her husband's death. In 1825, it passed to their son Peder Brønnum Scavenius. It was after his death owned by his son Jacob Frederik Brønnum Scavenius until 1915 and then by his grandson (1915–1923) Frederik Scavenius until 1922.

=== Tesdorpf family ===
In 1925, Adolph Tesdorpf purchased the estate. It has remained in the possession of the Tesdorpf family since then.

In January 2018, Peter Henrik Tesdorpf sold Gjorslev to his son Jens Edward Tesdorpf. In 2020–21, he gave up milk production on the estate.

== Architecture ==
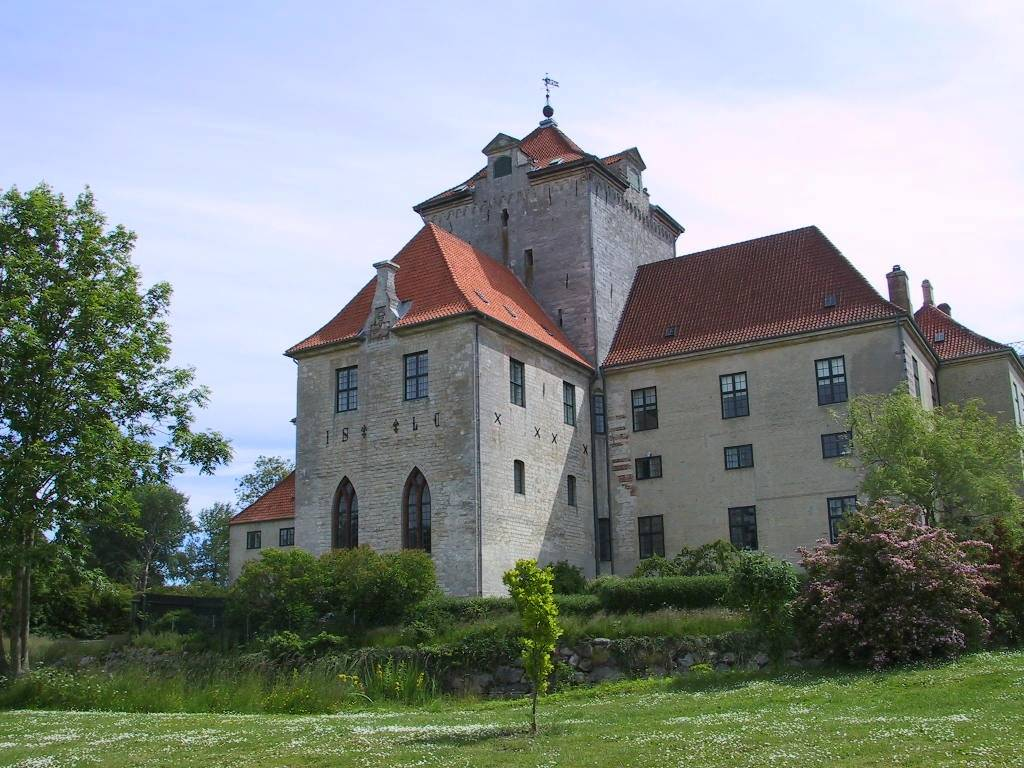
The main building.

Gjorslev is surrounded by moats and built to a cruciform design in the Gothic style. The building materials are a combination of local limestone from the Cliffs of Stevns and large bricks (Danish "monk stones").

The central tower is just under 30 m tall and has seven storeys. The south arm of the cross is slightly longer than the other three. A lower north wing was added in 1638.

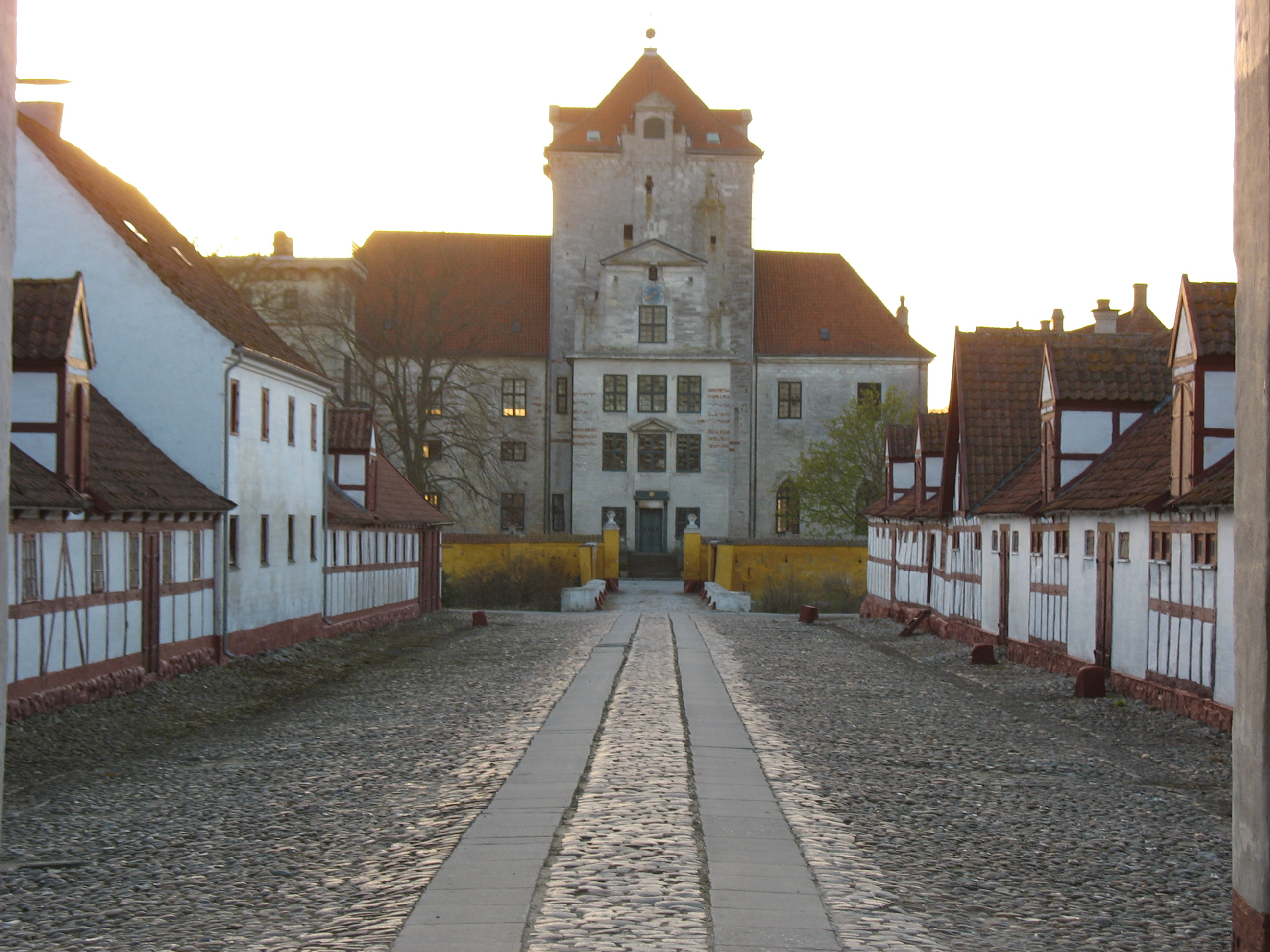
The east facade with the main entrance

Access to the main building was originally through the cellar from an entrance below the bishop's chapel which was located on the east side of the southern cross arm. From the vaulted cellar below the tower, a flight of stairs led to the domed hall in its ground floor. This arrangement was altered by Ewert Janssen between 1665 and 1676. The chapel was demolished and the entrance moved to the eastern cross arm which was also given a new facade and an internal staircase in the Baroque style.

The design of the roof was adapted in 1748 when the original crow-stepped gable with blank arches were replaced by hipped roofs and a pyramidal roof on the tower. The last time the building was altered was in 1843 when a long south wing was added.

The castle stands at the end of a street known as "Broad Street" which is lined by red timbered farm buildings from 1713.

== Estate ==
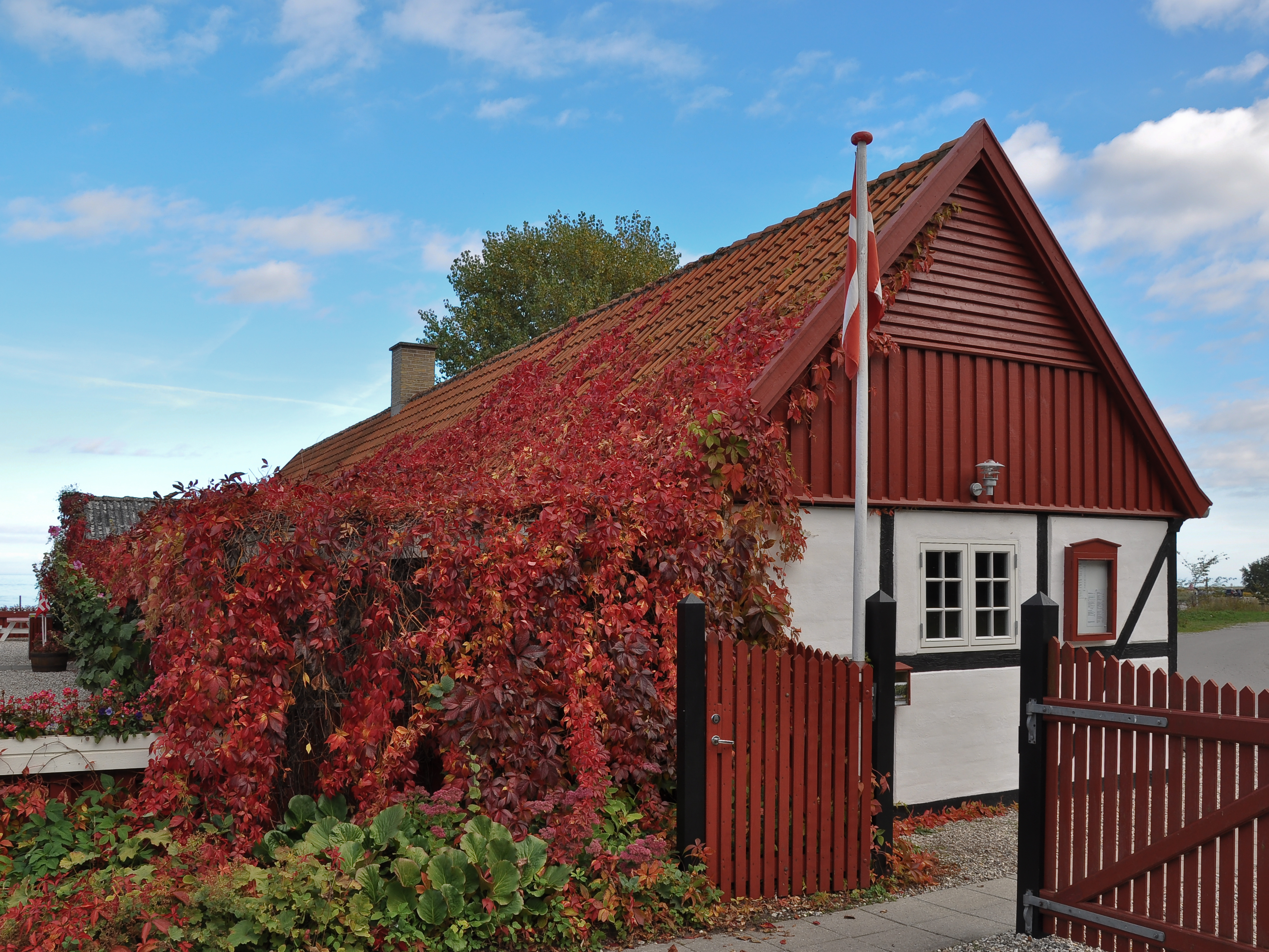
Traktørstedet Gjorslev Bøgeskov entrance

Gjorslev Beech Forest (Gjorslev Bøgeskov) belongs to the estate. The forest contains a small lake, Møllesøen ("The Mill Lake"), which has a rich bird life. An observation tower has been built at the site. The forest also contains 55 burial mounds of which the longest, Fruehøj, is 51 metre long. Access to the forest is from Traktørstedet Gjorslev Bøgeskov, a restaurant.

== List of owners ==
- (?–1294) Rane Jonsen
- (?–1536) Roskilde Bispestol
- (1536–1540) Kronen
- (1540–1552) Peder Svave
- (1552–?) Else Mouritzdatter Svave
- (?–1606) Elsebe Pedersdatter Svave, gift Juel
- (1606–1612) Peder Vincentsen Juel
- (1612–1619) Ellen Vincentsdatter Juel, gift Bille
- (1619–1630) Vincents Jensen Bille
- (1630–1646) Just Høg
- (1646–1664) Stygge Høg
- (1664–1675) Joachim Irgens von Westervick
- (1675–1678) Cornelia Bicker, gift Irgens
- (1678) Handelshuset Schardinell
- (1678–1743) Kronen
- (1743–1772) Christen Lindencrone
- (1772–1793) Johan Frederik de Lindencrone
- (1793–1820) Jacob Brønnum Scavenius
- (1820–1825) Karine Lucie Debes, gift Scavenius
- (1825–1868) Peder Brønnum Scavenius
- (1868–1915) Jacob Frederik Brønnum Scavenius
- (1915–1923) Frederik Scavenius
- (1923–1925) Else Haxthausen, gift Scavenius
- (1925–1929) Adolph Tesdorpf
- (1929–1940) Agnete Tesdorpf née Brun
- (1940–1970) Edward Tesdorpf
- (1970–2018) Peter Henrik Tesdorpf
- (2018- ) Jens Edward Tesdorpf

== See also ==
- Church of Our Lady, Kalundborg
