= Vingårdstræde 19 =

Building in Copenhagen, Denmark

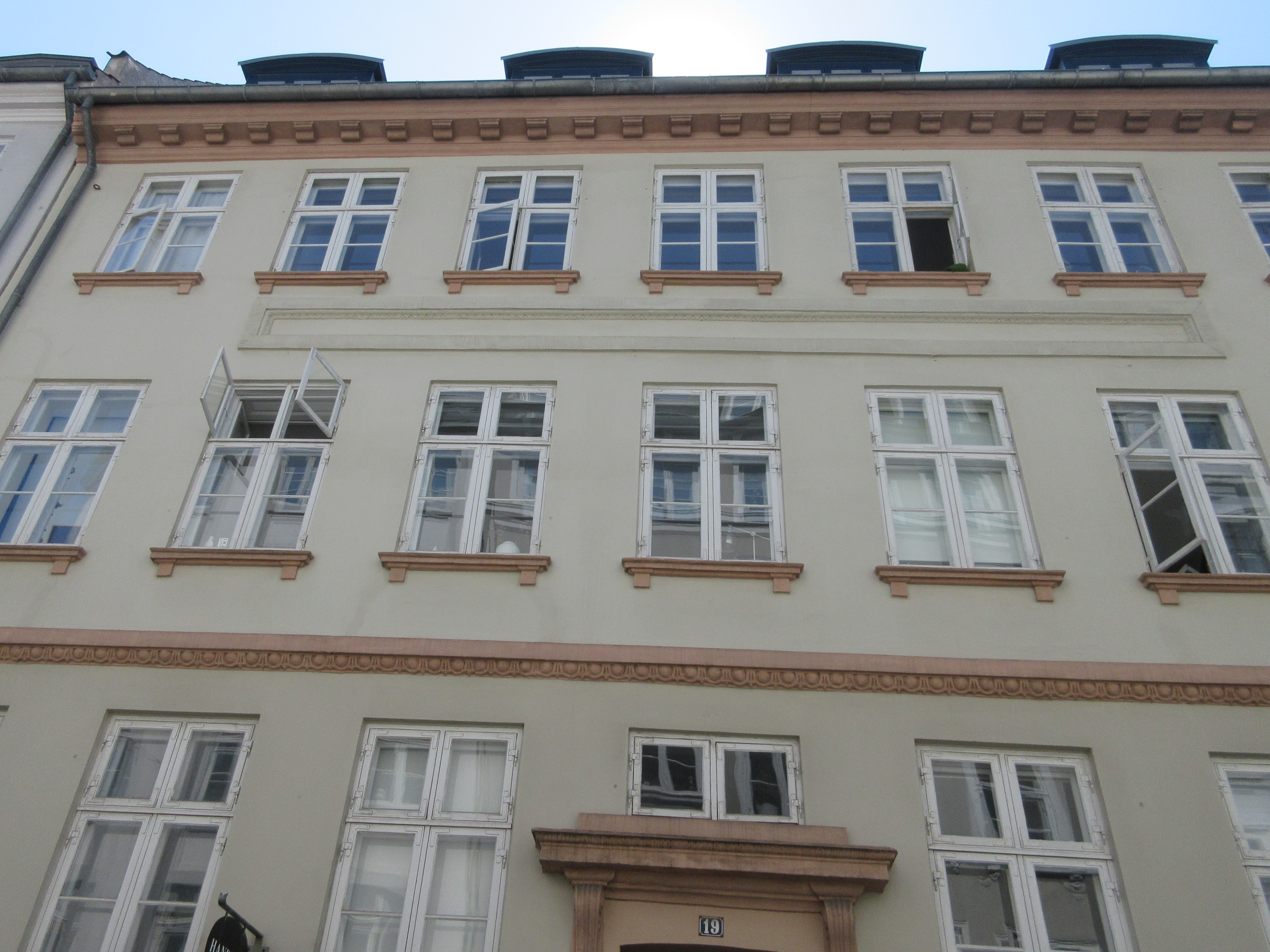

General information
- Architectural style: Neoclassical
- Location: Copenhagen
- Country: Denmark
- Coordinates: 55°40′42.42″N 12°34′58.15″E
- Completed: 1796

Vingårdstrøde 19 is a Neoclassical property situated on Vingårdstræde, between Kongens Nytorv and Nikolaj Plads, in central Copenhagen, Denmark. Like most of the other buildings in the area, the building was constructed as part of the rebuilding of the city following the Copenhagen Fire of 1795. It was listed in the Danish registry of protected buildings and places in 1959. A number of people associated with the Royal Danish Theatre have resided in the building, including ballet dancers and choreographers Antoine Bournonville, August Bournonville and Carl Dahlén, as well as a number of members of the Royal Danish Orchestra. Other notable former residents include future cookbook writer Anne Marie Mangor, portrait painter Johan Frederik Møller and sculptor Daniel Peter Støhrmann.

== History ==
=== 18th century ===
By 1689, when Copenhagen's first cadastre was launched, the property was listed as No. 144 in the city's East Quarter (Øster Kvarter) and belonged to renteskriver Ander Sørensen's widow. It was later divided into two properties. They were listed as No. 176 and No. 177 in the new cadastre of 1756, and were at that time both owned by beer seller (øltapper) Frederik Hansen,

Together with most of the other buildings in the area, the properties were destroyed in the Copenhagen Fire of 1795 and subsequently merged again into a single property. The construction of the current building on the site was commenced by Niels Hansen and later completed by Hans Christian Schmidt in 1796. Schmidt was also responsible for the construction of Bremerholm 26 (1799–1800), Bremerholm 28/Dybensgade 14 (1797–1800), Nikolaj Plads 23 (1800) and the adaptation of the ruined St. Nicolas' church tower into a combined fire station and watch tower (1821–1823).

=== 19th century ===
Future cookbook writer Anne Marie Mangor (née Bang; 1781–1865) and her husband Valentin Mangor (1770–1812) resided in the building from 1801 to 1807. Valentin Mangor was a senior clerk working for Hof- og Stadsretten.

At the time of the 1801 census, the property was also home to six other households. Johan Volf, operator of a billiards salon, resided in the building with his wife Anna Olsen, their seven children (aged two to 15), a female cook and a maid. Nicolaj Myhlin, a senior clerk (fuldmægtig), resided in the building with his wife Maren Brandenborg and one maid. Johan Maeser, a 69-year-old widower, resided in the building with his daughter Christiane Maeser. Nicolaj Kettels, manager of the royal magazines, resided in the building with his wife Nelle Jensen, their three daughters (aged five to eleven), a 24-year-old niece and one maid. Hans Møller, a butcher (slagtersvend), resided in the building with his wife Sophie Rick and one maid. Johan Dobel, an innkeeper, resided in the building with his wife Caroline Ravn.

The property was listed as No. 143 in the new cadastre of 1806. It was owned by a man named Maiser,

Ballet dancer and future ballet master Antoine Bournonville (1760–1843) resided in one of the apartments from 1814 to 1837. His son August Bournonville (1805–1879) lived there with his parents until moving to Paris in 1924. Carl Dahlén (1770–1851), another former ballet dancer, resided in the building from 1814 to 1818.

At the time of the 1840 census, the property was home to a total of 40 people distributed among seven households. Otto Kastrup, a collector at the Class Lottery, resided on the ground floor with his wife Marie Thofte, their daughter Henriette Kastrup and a maid. Johan Frederik Møller, a portrait painter, resided in the other ground-floor apartment with his wife Emilie Albertine Martens, their three children (aged one to five), his mother-in-law Bolette Cæcilie Martens and one maid. Johan Frederik Rauch, a musician in the Royal Danish Orchestra, resided on the first floor with his wife Ida Omoth, their three sons and a maid. The two eldest sons, Julius and Ferdinand, were also members of the Royal Danish Orchestra. The third son Carl was a carpenter. Carl Weil, a corn doctor, resided in the other first-floor apartment with his wife Sara Aaronse, their two daughters (aged 23 and 27) and one maid. Engel Maria Gulcke, the 73-year-old widow of a baker, resided on the second floor with her two unmarried daughters (aged 36 and 48), a 29-year-old grandson (a tanner) and a maid. Johan Fraugott Sansky, another musician playing in the Royal Danish Orchestra, resided in the other second-floor apartment with his wife Caroline Sansky née Gerlach, their five children (aged eight to ten) and one maid. Hans Peder Andresen, an innkeeper, resided in the basement with his wife Sophie Marie Svendsen, the courier Gravers Jensen (a lodger), Jensen's wife Karen Sørensen and innkeeper Anders Hansen Holm.

Johan Frederik Møller and Otto Kastrup were still living with their families in the two ground-floor apartments in 1845. Andreas Foght (1802–1878), a broker, grocer (urtekræmmer) and rodemester (a sort of district executive), resided in one of the first-floor apartments with his wife Caroline Henriette Westrup, their six children (aged four to 14), his own 76-year-old mother Magdalene Margrethe Foght and one maid. Johan Frederik Planch, a musician in the Royal Danish Orchestra, resided in the other first-floor apartment with his wife Ida Elisabeth Omotte. Niels Lund, a county clerk (amtsfuldmægtig), resided in one of the second-floor apartments with his wife Tanny Cathinea Emma Mans, their two children (aged one and five), two foster children (aged 11 and 13) and one maid. Engel Marie Gylke, a 78-year-old widow, resided in the other second-floor apartment with her two unmarried daughters (aged 38 and 52) and one maid. Christen Pedersen, an innkeeper, resided in the basement with his wife Ane Marie, their two children (aged one and three) and one maid. The other dwelling in the basement was occupied by a tailor, a Royal Life Guard, a widow with her 12-year-old son and a sacked pallbearer (kigbærer).

Andreas Foght was still residing in the first-floor apartment to the right with his wife, their four children, his mother and one maid. Frederik Severin Bøje, a grocer (urtekræmmer), resided in the apartment on the first floor to the left as well as the basement to the right with his wife Anna Elisabeth Bøje, their four children (aged three to nine), an employee in his grocery business and two servants. Niels Lund and his family was still residing in the second-floor apartment to the right. Bolette Kjerstine Jürhensen née Hvidberg, a 70-year-old widow, resided on the second floor to the left with the 29-year-old widow Johanne Lorck née Jørgensen, Lorck's five-year-old son Frantz Andreas Lorck and one maid. Rasmus Hansen, a beer vendor (øltapper), resided in the basement to the left with his wife Elisabeth Marie Hansen, two maids and a 4-year-old girl. Sophie Hjorteberg, a 66-year-old Class Lottery collector, resided in the ground-floor apartment to the left. Hans Jochim Jacobs, a master tailor, resided in the ground-floor apartment to the right with his wife Johanne Jacobs née Møller, their three children (aged two to five), an apprentice and two lodgers. One of the lodgers was sculptor Daniel Peter Støhrmann and the other one was ornament carver Johann Heinrich Pescheke.

== Architecture ==
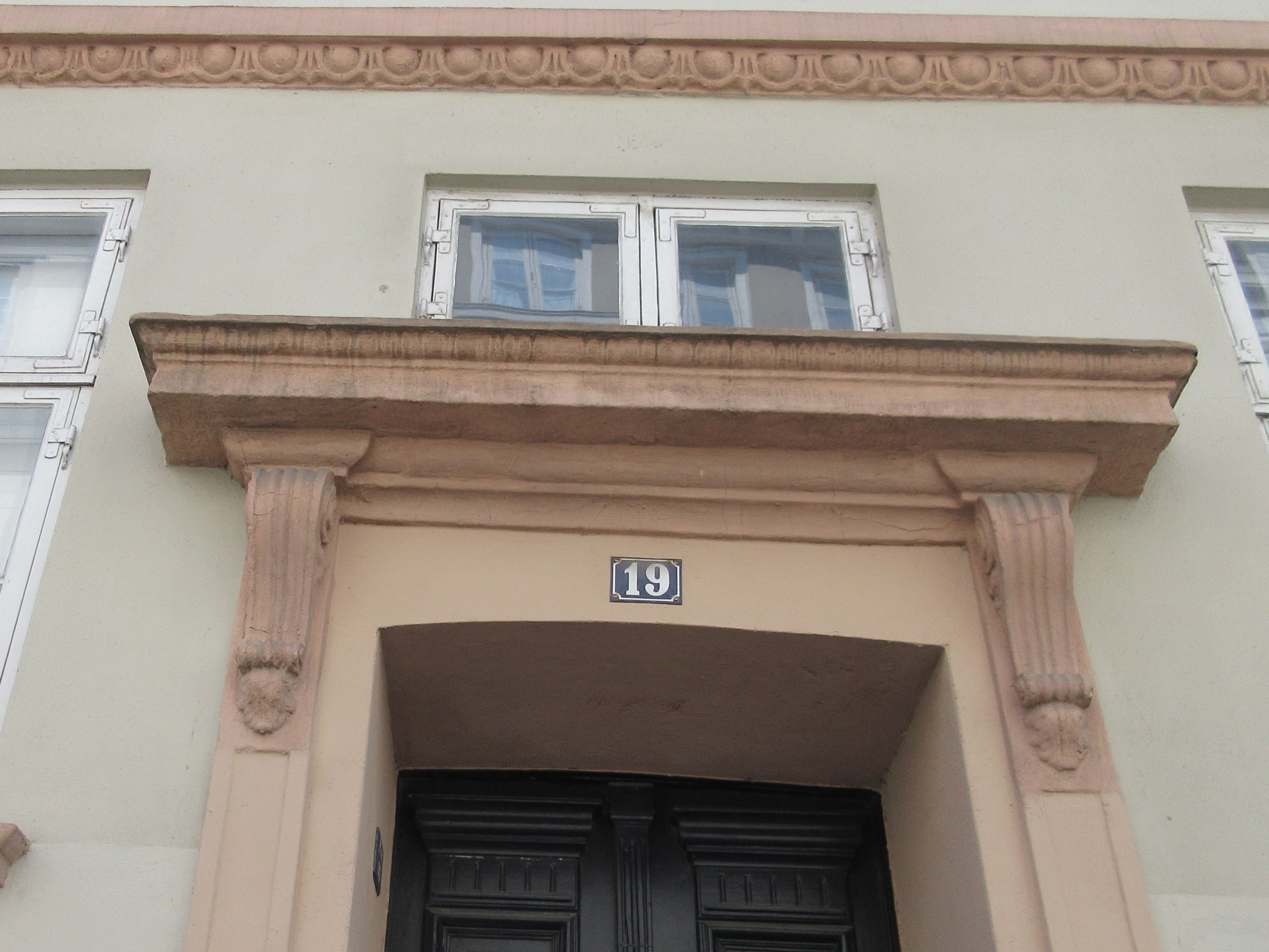
Detail of the main entrance.

Vingårdstræde 19 is constructed with three storeys over a walk-out basement and is seven bays wide. The plastered facade is finished with a belt course above the ground floor and a modillioned cornice. The main entrance in the central bay is raised four steps from street level and topped by a hood mould supported by corbels. It is flanked by two basement entrances in the third and fifth bays. All the windows are accented with sills supported by corbels and between the five central bays of the two upper floors is a depressed rectangular band.

Two single-bay appendices, one at each end, extend from the rear side of the building. The eastern appendix is the remains of a longer perpendicular wing which was shortened to the current length in connection with a renovation in 1970–1971.

== Today ==
The building is now owned by A/B Vingården. It contains two apartments on each floor.
