= Schall =

Schall may refer to:

== People ==
- Alvin Anthony Schall, American federal judge
- Claus Schall (1757-1835), Danish violinist and composer
- Dörte Schall (born 1977), German politician
- Eduardo Schall Jatyr, Brazilian basketball player
- Ekkehard Schall (1930-2005), German stage and screen actor/director
- Elizabeth Schall, American rock singer
- Elke Schall, German table tennis player
- Franz Schall (1918-1945), German World War II fighter ace
- Gene Schall, American baseball player
- George Schall (1768–1831), American politician from Pennsylvania
- James V. Schall, American Jesuit priest
- Johann Adam Schall von Bell (1591-1666), German Jesuit missionary
- Johanna Schall, German actress
- Karl Friedrich Schall (1859-1925), German precision engineer
- Kerry Schall, American mixed martial arts fighter
- Margrethe Schall (1775-1852), Danish ballerina
- Peder Schall (1762-1820), Danish composer
- Philipp Schall von Bell (?-1560), German commander-in-chief
- Thomas D. Schall (1878-1935), American lawyer and politician

== Other uses ==
- Synodontis schall, a catfish species
- Schall Circle, a census-designated place in Palm Beach County, Florida
