= List of ballets by Vincenzo Galeotti =

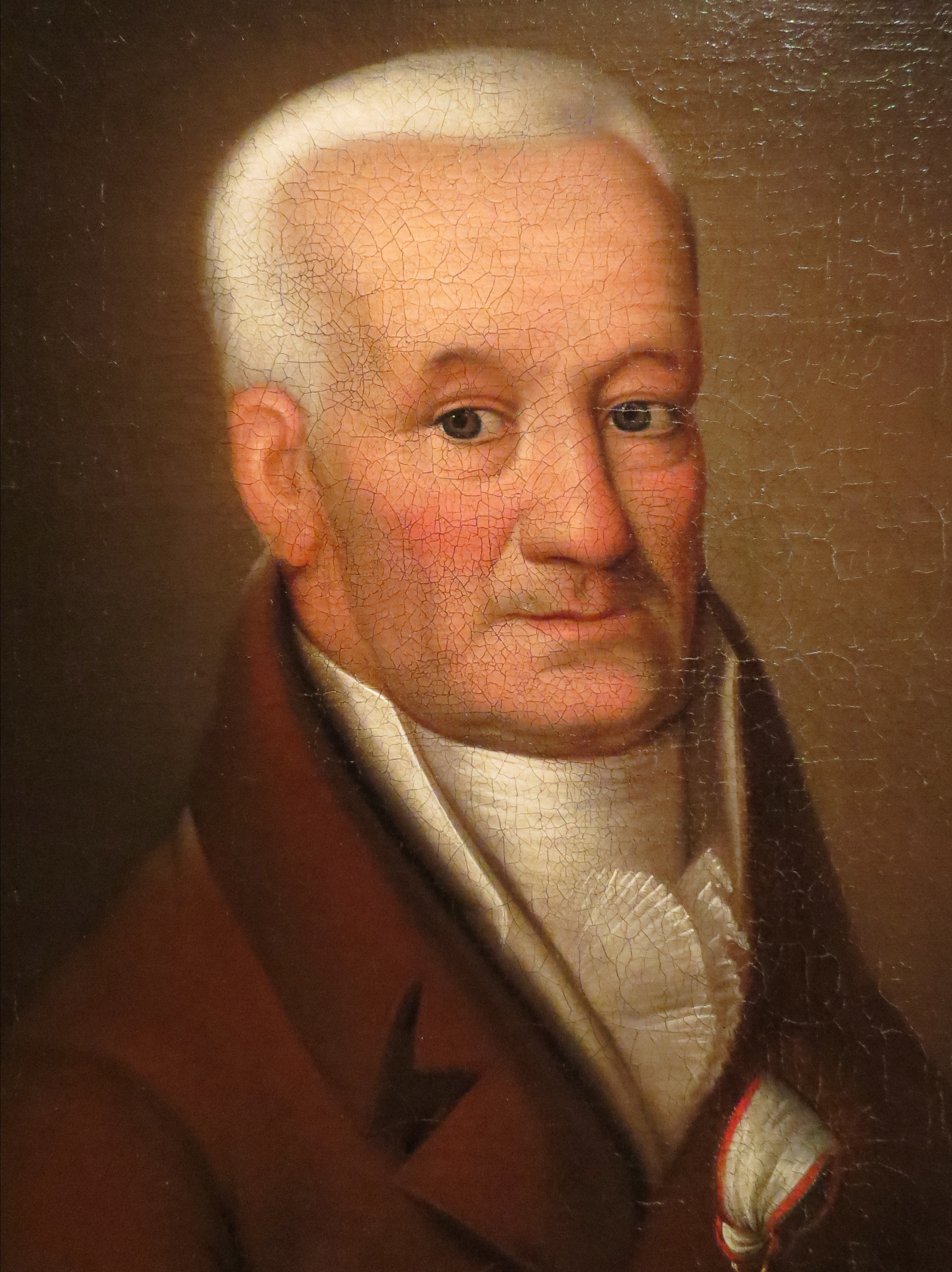
Vincenzo Galeotti

The following is a list of ballets by Danish dancer, choreographer and ballet master Vincenzo Galeotti (1733–1816).

- The King Hunting (20 October 1775), ballet in two acts
- The Peasants and the Lords of Lystgaarden (15 December 1775), ballet in one act music by Paolo Scalabrini (1713–1803)
- Zigeunernes Camp (30 January 1776), ballet in four acts
- Slavindehandleren (10 October 1776), ballet in one act
- Cupid's Sweet Revenge (29 October 1776), ballet in one act
- Mary Bones Garden in London (13 December 1776), ballet in one act
- The Victim Sofi (21 February 1777), ballet in one act
- The Disguised Dido (24 October 1777), heroic ballet in one act
- Betlersken (16 December 1777), ballet in one act
- The Art Vanquished by Love (30 January 1778), ballet in one act
- Statuen or the Useless Witchcraft (26 November 1778), ballet in one act
- Linna and Walvais (30 January 1779), ballet in one act
- The Magnanimous Turk (26 October 1779), ballet in one act
- L'Orphelin de la Chine (14 January 1780), ballet in one act
- Harp Player (2 March 1780), ballet in one act
- Love and Mista Ken Power (3 November 1780), ballet in four acts, music by Claus Schall (1757–1835)
- Milliner Indians (19 December 1780), ballet in one act
- Savoyardinderne (12 June 1781), ballet in one act, music by Claus Schall (1757–1835)
- Don Juan (29 October 1781), ballet in one act
- The Betrayed and Avenged Cupid (6 December 1781), ballet in one act, music by Claus Schall (1757–1835)
- Herman and Dolmon or Goddædighed and gratitude (11 April 1782), ballet in one act, music by Claus Schall (1757–1835)
- The Unexpected Help (6 December 1782), ballet in one act, music by Claus Schall music by Claus Schall (1757–1835)
- The Suspicious Wife (19 December 1782), ballet in one act, music by Claus Schall music by Claus Schall (1757–1835)
- Witch Master and the Charitable Fe (25 April 1783), ballet in one act
- The Lovers, Protected by Cupid (22 December 1783), ballet in one act
- Angelica and Medoro (30 January 1784), ballet in one act, music by Jens Lolle music by Jens Lolle (1751–1789)
- The Offenders Ignorance or Artists' Victory (23 September 1784), ballet in one act, music by Jens Lolle (1751–1789)
- Cupid and Psyche (3 December 1784), allegorical ballet in one act, music by Claus Schall music by Claus Schall (1757–1835)
- Laurette or The improved Seducer (11 February 1785), pantomime ballet in two acts, music by Claus Schall (1757–1835)
- Cupid and the Ballet Master Luner (31 October 1786), ballet in one act, music by Jens Lolle (1751–1789)
- Semiramis (30 January 1787), tragic pantomime-ballet in five acts, the music of darbe
- Laundry Girls and Keddelflikkeren (15 January 1788), comic ballet in three acts, music by Claus Schall (1757–1835)
- Idol of Ceylon (29 April 1788), comic ballet in four acts, music by Claus Schall music by Claus Schall (1757–1835)
- Positions Transferee (1788)
- Task Eren (30 September 1788), comic ballet in one act, Music by Claus Schall arranged by P. Larcher.
- Aline, Queen of Golkonda (2 February 1789), opera in three acts, music by JAP Schulz (1747–1800)
- The Feigned Deaf (28 October 1790), ballet in one act
- Transformation Provided or the Devil is Loose (2 September 1791), ballet in 3 Acts, music by Claus Schall (1757–1835)
- China Dangers (2 March 1792), sing piece in two acts, music by Claus Schall (1757–1835), composed by Vuncenzo Galeotti, by PA Heiberg (1758–1841)
- Telemak on Calypso's Island (28 December 1792), opera-Ballet in four acts, poetry by Chr. Barge, music of Maria Theresia Ahlefeldt- (1755–1810)
- Peter's Wedding (12 December 1793), sing piece in two acts, music by JAP Schulz (1747–1800)
- Machinisten (16 October 1795)
- Waverer or Enchanted Malerie (6 May 1796), ballet in one act of Vincenzo Galeotti, music by Claus Schall (1757–1835)
- Annette and Lubin (18 September 1797), ballet in one act by, music by Claus Schall (1757–1835)
- Herman von Unna (30 January 1800), drama in 5 Acts of AF Skjöldebrand (1757–1834, languages: Swedish ). Music by GJ Vogler (1749–1814, Language: German), Dance of Vincenzo Galeotti
- Cupid and Psyche (1801)
- Lagertha (30 January 1801), pantomime tragedy mixed with singing in three acts, verses of C. Pram, music by Claus Schall (1757–1835)
- Bjærgbøndernes Children and mirror (23 September 1802), comic ballet in two acts, music by Claus Schall (1757–1835)
- Nina or the Lunatic of Love (26 November 1802), ballet [later: Pantomime-Ballet] in 2 Acts, music by Claus Schall (1757–1835)
- Ines de Castro (30 January 1804), tragic pantomime-ballet in five acts, music by Claus Schall (1757–1835)
- Laurette or Improved Seducer (1804 )
- Gyrithe or Danmaraks Salvation Ancestral (30 January 1807), domestic drama with Corinthians in 4 Acts by Lauritz Kruse (1778–1839) with music by FLAe. Kunzen (1761–1817) and Dance of Vincenzo Galeotti
- Rolf Bluebeard (13 December 1808), tragic ballet in four acts, music by Claus Schall (1757–1835)
- Morning Hour (1809)
- Dream (29 January 1810), pantomime prologue to King Frederick certain Birthday of Vincenzo Galeotti, music by Claus Schall (1757–1835)
- Romeo and Giulietta (2 April 1811), tragic ballet in five acts, music by Claus Schall (1757–1835)
- Koromanien or Dansesygen (29 October 1811), comic ballet in two acts, music by Claus Schall (1757–1835)
- Choromanien (1811)
- Cendrillon or The Little Green Shoes (29 October 1812), lyrical magic play in 3 Acts of CG Etienne. music by George Zinck (1788–1828)
- Alma and Elfride or Forest by Hermannstad (29 January 1813), sing piece in 3 Acts, music by Claus Schall (1757–1835), Text by Sophie Cottin (1770–1807, languages: French), dance of Antoine Bournonville (1760–1843)
- Zigeuneres Camp (1813)
- The Hut in the Black Forest (31 January 1814), sing piece in 3 Acts, music by Carl Braun (1788–1835), Text of anonymous French (language: French), translated by Niels Thoroup Bruun (1778–1823)
- Macbeth (2 April 1816), tragic ballet in five acts by Vincenzo Galeotti, music by Claus Schall (1757–1835)
