= Nikolaj Plads 32 =

Building in Copenhagen

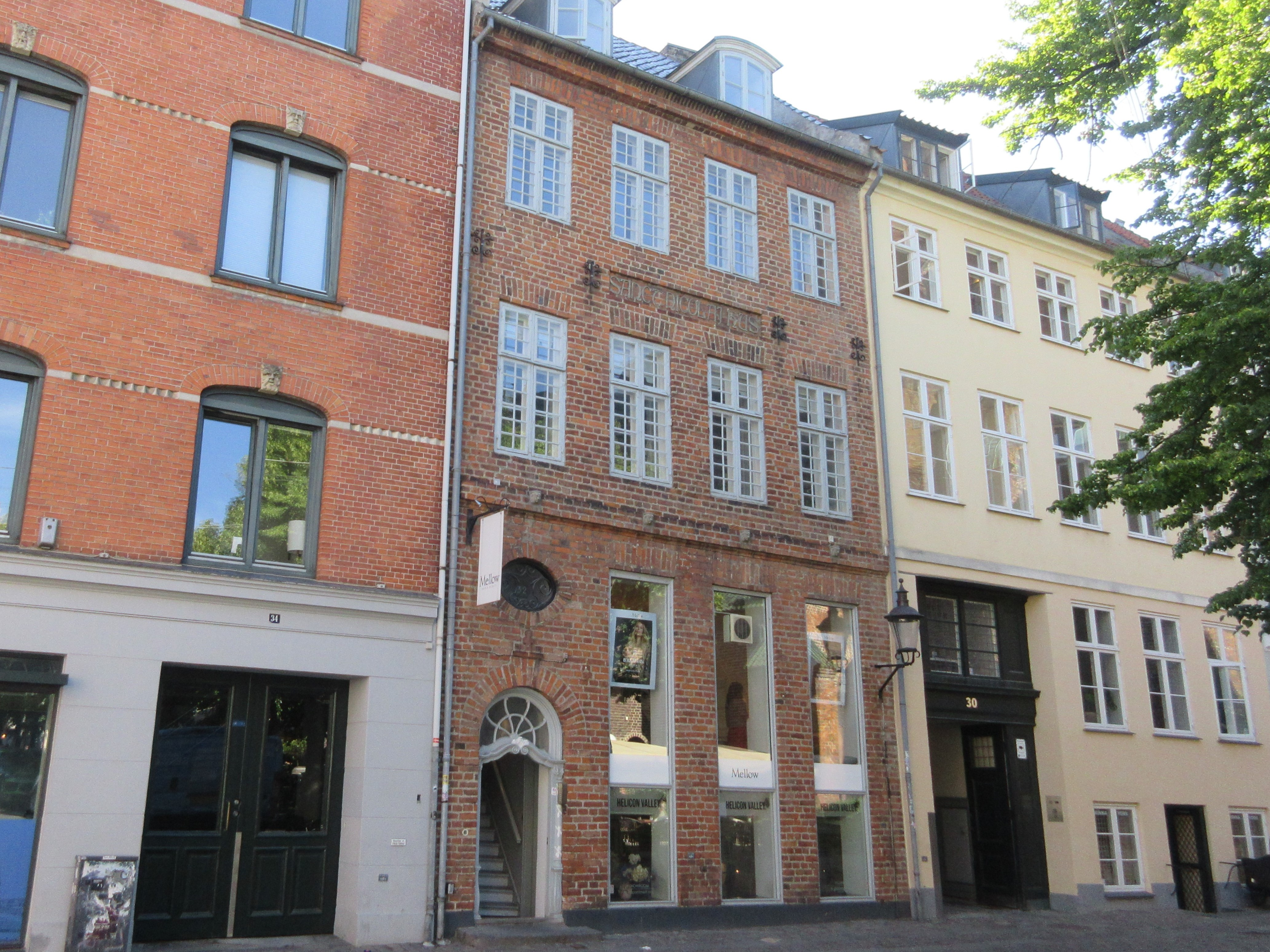
- Interactive map of the Nikolaj Plads 32 area

General information
- Architectural style: Neoclassical
- Location: Copenhagen, Denmark
- Coordinates: 55°40′41.84″N 12°34′52.5″E
- Completed: 1797

Design and construction
- Architect: Andreas Hallander

Nikolaj Plads 32, also known as Sankt Nicolai Hus, is a property situated on the west side of Nikolaj Plads in Copenhagen, Denmark. It was, like most of the other buildings in the area, constructed as part of the rebuilding of the city following the Copenhagen Fire of 1795. It was listed in the Danish registry of protected buildings and places in 1945. Former residents include the theatrical scenic painter Christian Ferdinand Christensen.

== History ==
=== 18th century ===
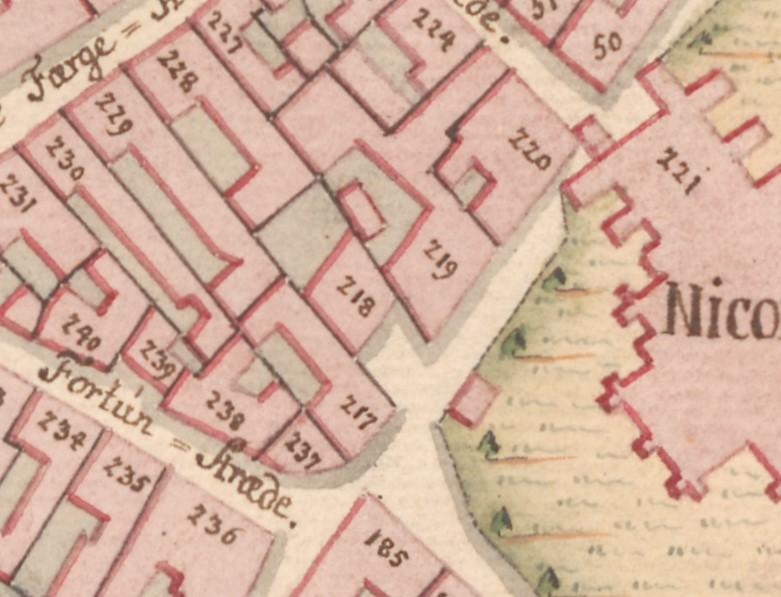
Christian Gedde's map of the East Quarter, 1757.

The property was listed as No. 189 in the city's East Quarter (Øster Kvarter) in 1689 and was owned by tailor Gregers Iversen's widow. The relatively small property was set back from the street. It was listed as No. 218 in 1756 and owned by St. Nicolas' Church and operated as a school.

Together with most of the other buildings in the area, the school building was destroyed in the Copenhagen Fire of 1795. The current building was constructed in 1796–1797 by the master builder Andreas Hallander for merchant (grosserer) Christian Thomsen (1756–1833). Thomsen was the father of the historian Christian Jürgensen Thomsen.

=== 19th century ===
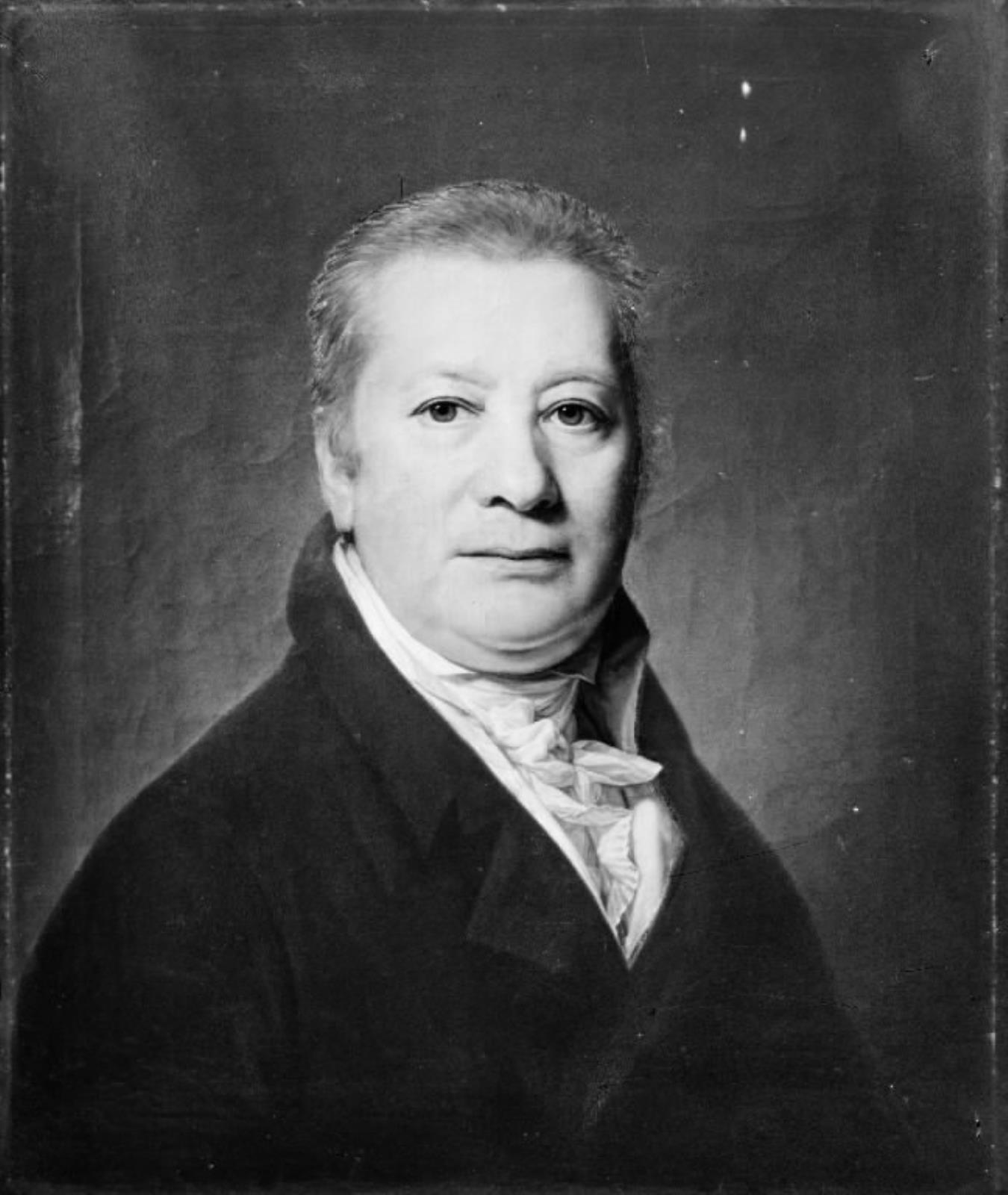
Christian Thomsen

The property was at the 1801 census home to two households. Marie Graae, a widow bookbinder, resided in the building with her three daughters (aged 16 to 30), a maid, two bookbinders working for her, the 35-year-old merchant Johan Leiner and four more maids. Henrick Habertin, a sea captain from the Danish West Indies, resided in the building with his wife Helene Sielle, a maid and a lodger.

The property was listed as No. 103 in the new cadastre of 1806. It was still owned at that time by Thomsen.

The property was, at the time of the 1840 census, home to a total of 18 residents. H. T. Amundsen, a Class Lottery collector, resided on the ground floor with his wife Christine Elisabeth Andersen née Gunnst, their four daughters (aged 12 to 18) and a maid. Their daughter Johanne C. Elise (aged 17) was a dancer at the Royal Danish Theatre. Lovise Ebel, a 54-year-old widow fashion retailer, resided on the first floor with her daughter Caroline Ebel and a lodger. Sara Jacobsen, another widow, resided on the second floor with her six children and a maid.

The number of residents had increased to 21 by 1845. The now-widowed Christiane Elisabeth Amundsen was still residing with her four children on the ground floor. J. Petersen, a courier working for Rentekammeret, was also residing on the ground floor with his two children (aged 13 and 15) and a maid. Christian Ferdinand Christensen (1805–1883), a scenic painter at the Royal Danish Theatre, resided on the second floor with his wife Ida née Thaning, their four children (aged two to eight), his mother-in-law Hedevig Thaning and two maids. Thomas Nielsen, a grocer (høker) resided in the basement with his wife Karen Marie Nielsen née Petersen and a maid.

Christian Ferdinand Christensen and his wife still resided on the second floor at the time of the 1850 census. They lived there with their now six children, the mother-in-law and two maids. Christiane Elisabeth Ammundin was still residing on the ground floor with two of her daughters. Peter Jacobsen, an innkeeper, resided in the basement with his wife Anthonia Nicoline Scheuermann, their six-year-old son Peter Emiel Jacobsen and a maid.

=== 20th century ===
The property was acquired by Danske Kvinders Velfærd (DLV) in 1845. The organisation had until then been based at Kronprinsessegade 4.

== Architecture ==
Nikolaj Plads 32 is constructed in red brick with three storeys over a walk-out basement and is just four bays wide. The undressed brick facade features a belt course with four sandstone heads above the ground floor and a simple cornice below the roof. The name of the building, Sankt Nicolai Hus, is now written with metal letters on a depressed rectangular wall section, flanked by four decorative wall anchors, two on each side, between the two upper floors. The doorway is topped by an arched fanlight and above it is an oval window. The roof is clad with brack tile and features two dormer windows towards the street. The roof ridge is pierced by a chimney.

A seven-bay-long perpendicular wing extends from the rear side of the building. The first bay is acanted, improving its integration with the front wing. The perpendicular wing is roofed with red tile and its facade is plastered in a pale sand colour.

== Today ==
Nikolaj Plads 32 is owned today by Søren Holger Toft. It contains commercial spaces on the three lower floors and a residential apartment on the second floor and another one in the garret.

== Gallery ==
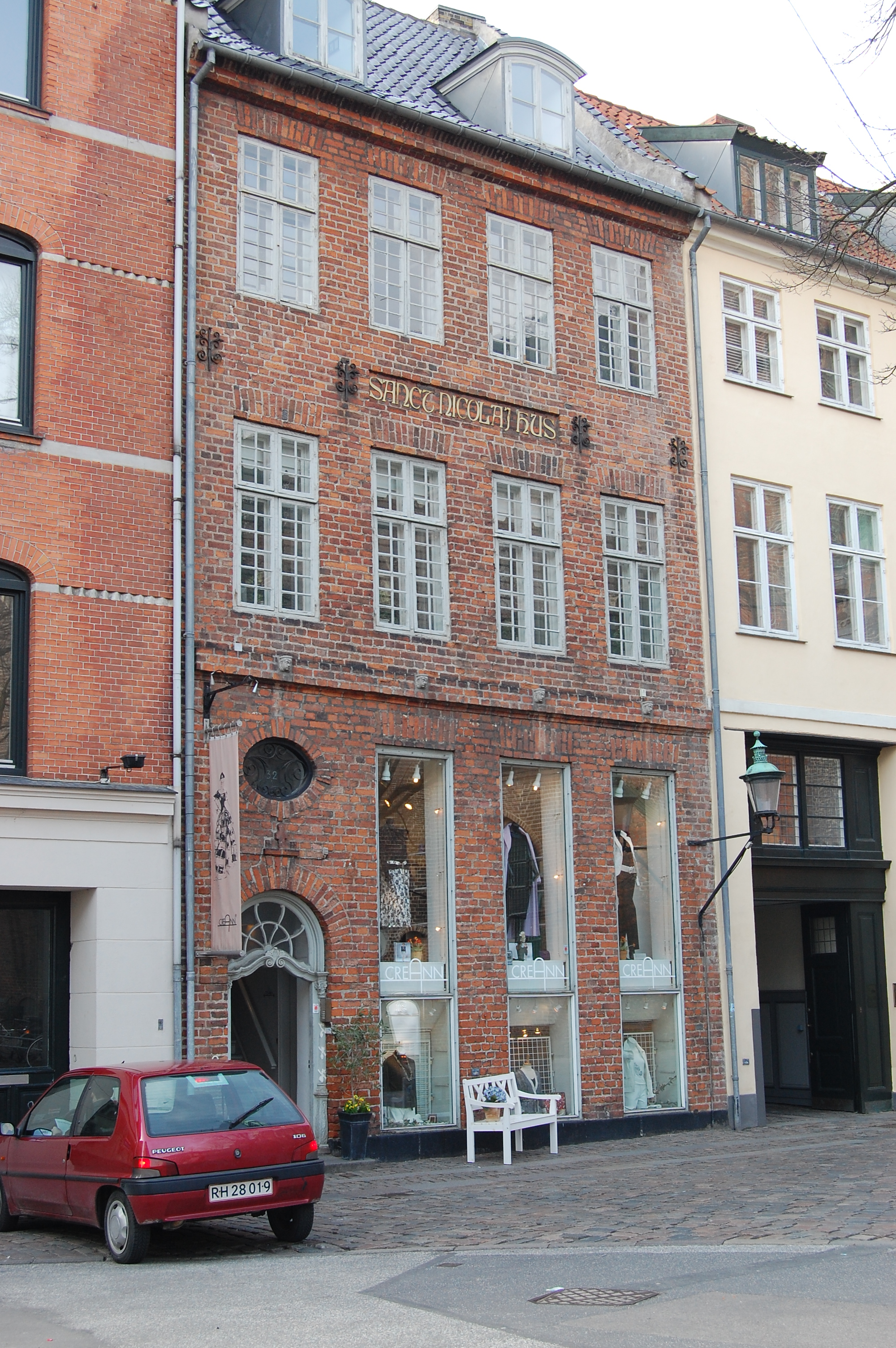

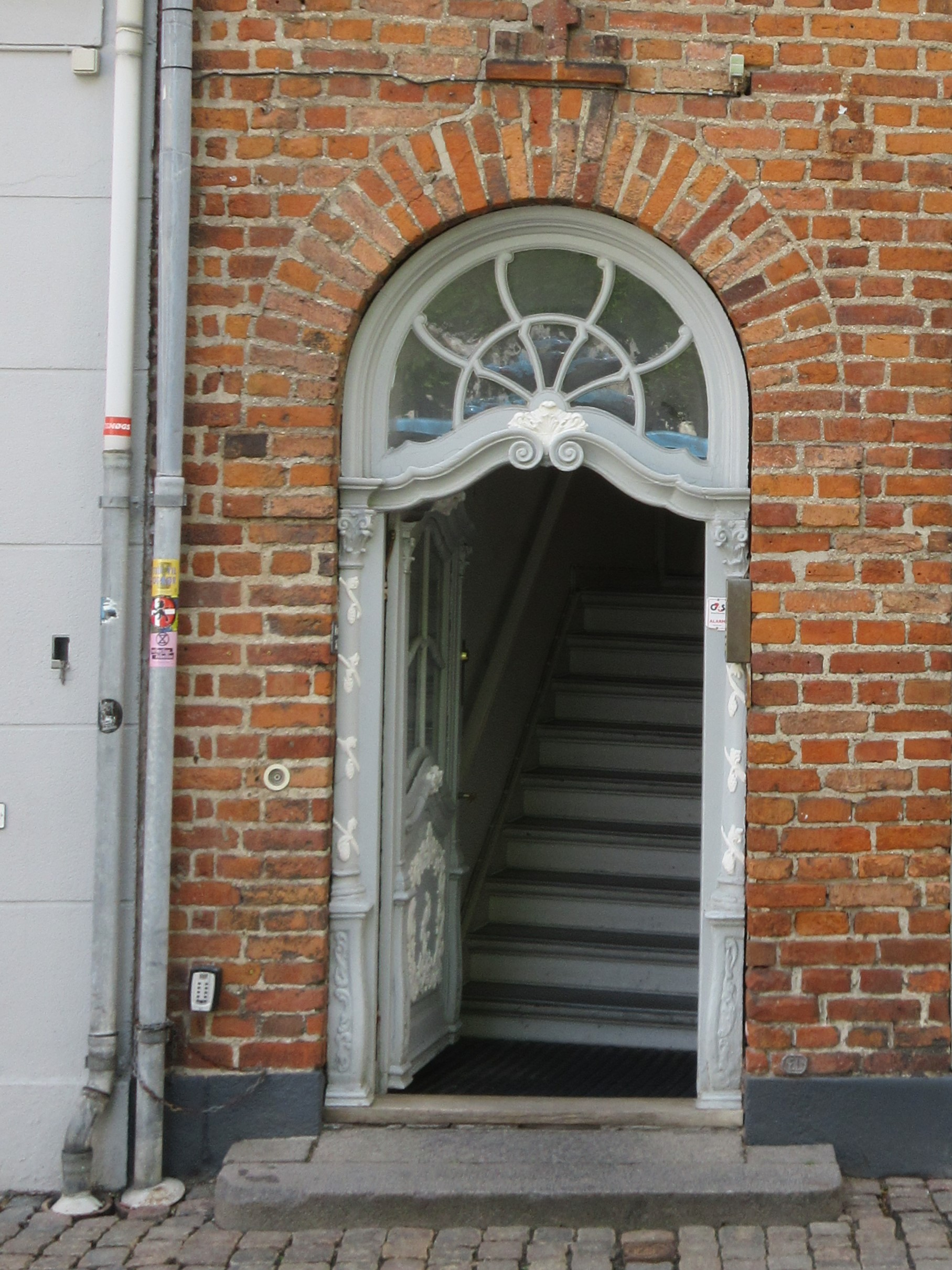
Main entrance

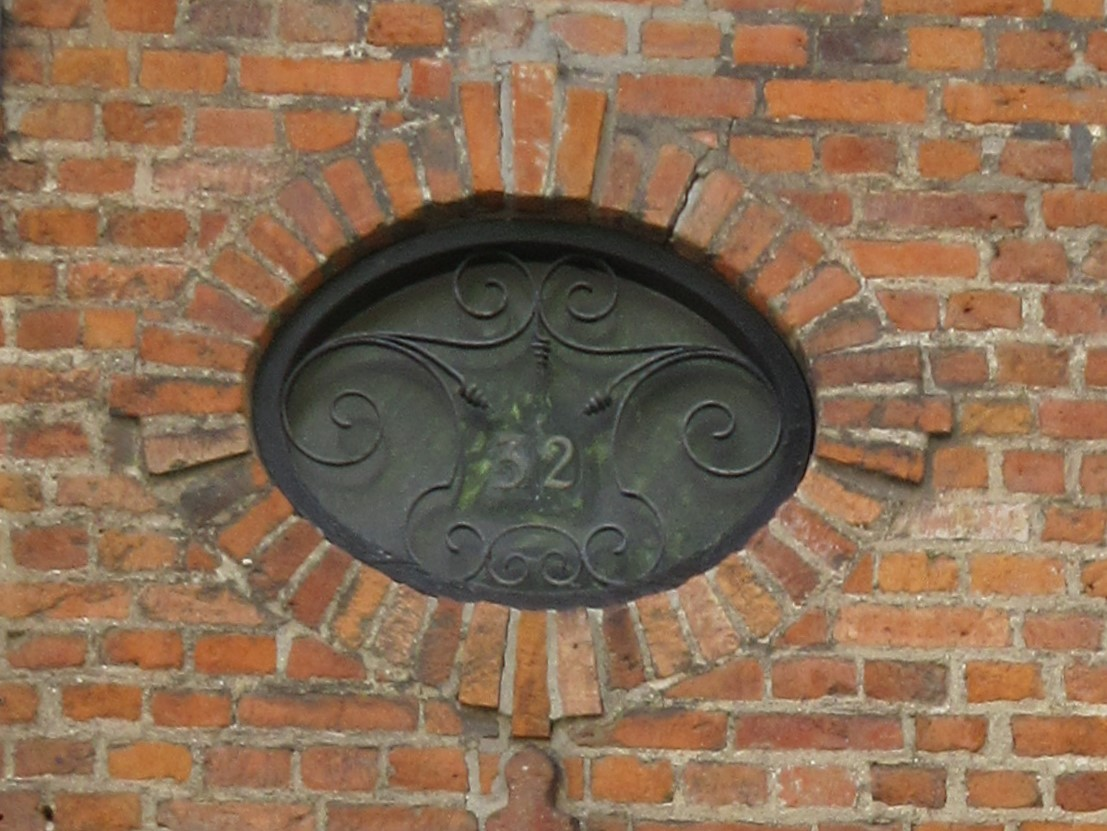
