= Marie Christine Björn =

Danish ballet dancer (1763–1837)

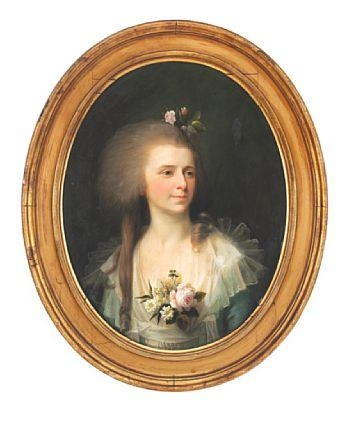
Portrait of Marie Christine Björn by Jens Juel

Marie Christine Björn (March 18, 1763 – 15 April 1837) was a Danish ballerina and actress. She was regarded one of the greatest stars within Danish ballet.

Marie Christine Björn was the wife of secretary Christian Björn. She became a student in the ballet of Vincenzo Galeotti at the Royal Danish Theatre in Copenhagen in 1778 and debuted as a solo dancer in 1781.

She became popular and replaced Anine Frølich as the female star of the Danish ballet. She was admired for her mimique and her combination of dignity and softness. She also acted in dramatic plays and made a success in the part of a page boy in 1786. She was considered a worthy dance partner by Antoine Bournonville, who performed with her the first time in 1792. She was made premier dancer in 1802 and retired in 1804.
