= Mariane Bournonville =

Danish actress

Mariane Bournonville née Jensen (1768–1797), was a Danish ballerina. She was active at the Royal Danish Ballet in 1784-1796, and is counted as among the elite of her profession at the time, famed for her performance within comedie ballet. She ended her ballet career in 1796, and worked her last year as an actress. She was a student of Vincenzo Galeotti. She was married to Antoine Bournonville. She died in Childbirth in 1797.
