= Grotesque dance =

Dance

Grotesque dance (French: danse grotesque; Italian: ballo grottesco or danza grottesca) is a category of theatrical dance that became more clearly differentiated in the 18th century and was incorporated into ballet, although it had its roots in earlier centuries. As opposed to the danse noble or "noble dance" performed in royal courts which emphasized beauty of movement and noble themes, grotesque dances were comic or lighthearted and created for buffoons and commedia dell'arte characters to amuse and entertain spectators or patrons. In 16th and 17th centuries grotesque dances were often presented as an anti-masque, performed between the acts of more serious courtly entertainments. Likewise, the 17th century entrée de ballet (a series of loosely connected tableaux rather than a continuous dramatic narrative) sometimes contained grotesque sequences, most notably those devised by the Duke of Nemours for the court of Louis XIII.

Some of the grotesque performers were physically deformed, but the Italian tradition of ballo grottesco, typified by the dancer and choreographer Gennaro Magri whose career was at its apex in the 1760s, involved a high degree of virtuosity and athleticism. Ballets which contain grotesque dances or consist solely of grotesque dance include Campra's Le jaloux trompé and Ravel's Daphnis et Chloé (Dorcon's dance in Part 1). Dancers who excelled in the grotesque genre besides Magri included Margrethe Schall and John D'Auban.

== Magri's Grotteschi ==
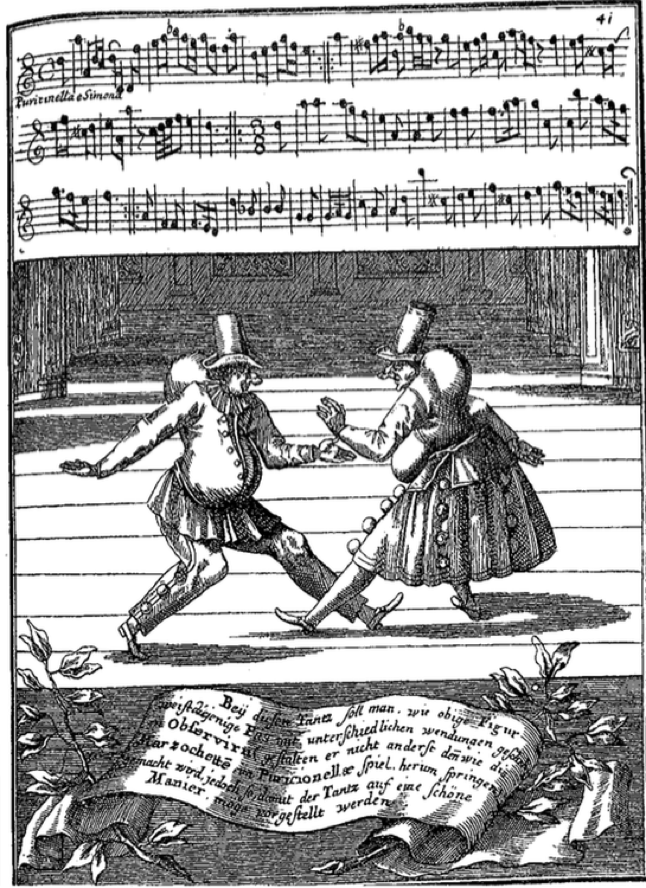
Grotesque Dancers - Plate from Gregorio Lambranzi's New and Curious School of Theatrical Dancing (Nuremberg, 1716)

Gennaro Magri's 1779 treatise, Trattato teorico-prattico di ballo, one of the leading publications about dance technique from the 18th century, offers a rare view of the grotesque style of theatrical dance. One of the achievements of Magri's treatise is that is makes the argument for placing the ballerini grotteschi on the same level of appreciation as ballerini seri. According to Magri, false positions (inwardly turned) or Spanish positions (neutral in turnout) were more often used by ballerini grotteschi, as opposed to the normative French turned out positions. Magri asserts pirouettes on one foot, revolving for as many turns as possible, as part of the repertory of the grotteschi, whereas pirouettes on two feet were for amateurs. He also links the grotteschi's dance vocabulary with the cabrioles. One interesting such airborne step, salto dell'impiccato (translated as: hangman's jump) requires great elevation in order to create contrast between the trunk and the falling arms, and then a one-foot landing with the second leg detached into the air as much as possible. Magri assigns wrapping steps, sprung steps, steps of multiple turns, and airborne steps interweaving and beating the legs into the grotteschi's repertory of movements. However, he makes the distinction that it is not these steps that make the ballerini grotteschi, but rather the body as a "vortex of force" that articulates kinetic principles to get energy out into physical movement in a controlled and concentrated manner. The grotesque bodies are bodies that constantly concentrate and release energy as a characteristic part of their activity.

== Sources ==
- Astington, John (1999). English Court Theatre, 1558-1642 English court theatre, 1558-1642]. Cambridge University Press. ISBN 0-521-64065-2
- Buch, David Joseph (1993). Dance music from the Ballets de cour 1575-1651. Pendragon Press. ISBN 0-945193-33-5
- Harris-Warrick, Rebecca (2005). The grotesque dancer on the eighteenth-century stage: Gennaro Magri and his world. University of Wisconsin Press. ISBN 0-299-20354-9
- Kisselgoff, Anna (April 15, 1984). "Grotesque Imagery Has Come to Dance". The New York Times.
- Thorp, Jennifer (2005). "Eloquent bodies: humanist and grotesque dance", Early Music, November 2005, 33 (4) pp. 702-704.
