= Mill at Lobachsville =

- U.S. National Register of Historic Places
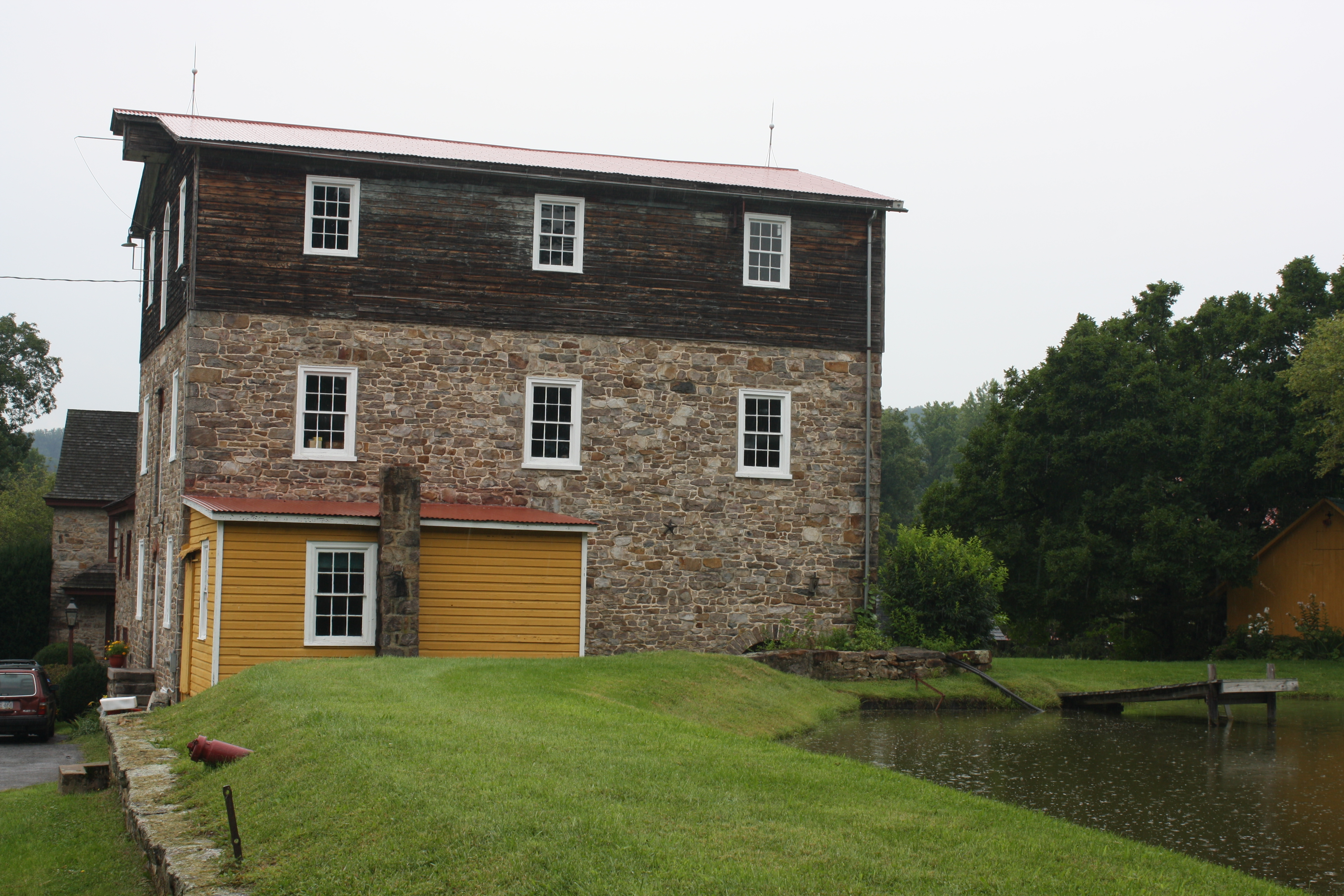
- Mill at Lobachsville. August 2013.

- Location within Pennsylvania Location within the United States
- Location: Mill Rd. at Pine Creek, Pike Township, Pennsylvania
- Coordinates: 40°24′43″N 75°43′51″W
- Area: 31 acres (13 ha)
- Built: 1887
- MPS: Gristmills in Berks County MPS
- NRHP reference No.: 90001624
- Added to NRHP: November 8, 1990

The Mill at Lobachsville is an historic grist mill complex in Pike Township, Berks County, Pennsylvania, United States.

It was listed on the National Register of Historic Places in 1990.

== History and architectural features ==
This historic complex consists of a three-story, stone-and-frame, banked mill with corrugated steel gable roof (1887), a 2 1/2-story, stone-and-frame, farmhouse (c. 1745), a 2 1/2-story, stone settler's cabin that dates to the eighteenth century, a one-story, frame, summer kitchen, a one-story, frame, ice house, a one-story, frame, wagon shed, a two-story, stone-and-frame barn (1814), a one seat privy, a stone-and-frame pig sty, and the millraces and pond. The mill ceased operation in 1965. The custom mill was built as part of a working farm.
