= Anine Frølich =

- Born: Anine Marie Magdalene Frølich; 13 March 1762; Copenhagen, Denmark
- Died: 6 November 1784 (aged 22); Copenhagen, Denmark
- Occupation: Ballerina

Anine Marie Magdalene Frølich (13 March 1762 – 6 November 1784) was a Danish ballerina, one of the first professional native ballet dancers in Denmark and the first native star within the Royal Danish Ballet. Anine Frølich was perhaps the principal figure in the emergence of classical ballet as a distinct art-form in Denmark.

== Biography ==
Frølich was born in Copenhagen, and was accepted as a student in the ballet school of the Court-Theater Hofteatret in 1771. The Court-Theater had been founded in 1767 at the Christiansborg Palace by Pierre Laurent of the French theater troupe employed there: it was to be merged with the Royal Danish Theatre when the French troupe was fired in 1772–73.

At this time, Ballet had only very recently been performed by native ballet dancers in Denmark. At the Royal Danish Theatre, native dancers had only performed since the season of 1758–59, which became the debut of Marie Barch and Carl Vilhelm Barch.

Frølich debuted in 1773 and became an instant success on account of her astonishing beauty, technical accomplishment and dramatic technique, which separated her from the more formal and stiff mannerisms adopted by most of contemporaries.

From 1775, Frølich came under the influence of the Italian dancer Vincenzo Galeotti. Having been made ballet-master of the Court Theater, he completely reformed the Danish ballet and stimulated a new enthusiasm for the art among the public. Until then, Danish ballet had been abstract and undramatic, formal and stilted. The idea of ballet as a dramatic art was introduced into Denmark by Galeotti, who made Frølich the star vehicle of his innovative choreography. With her expressive manner of dancing she complemented perfectly the new style of ballet under his direction. Under his leadership she became the ruling ballerina of the Danish ballet. One of her most famous roles was in the ballet Den forlodte Dido in 1777.

She and Galeotti also became lovers, but the relationship ended unhappily. Exhausted by the intense physical demands of her art, Frohlich's health deteriorated quickly. In 1784, she collapsed during a performance and was carried home, but died shortly afterwards in Copenhagen.

== See also ==
- Margrethe Schall
