= Hartman Cider Press =

- U.S. National Register of Historic Places
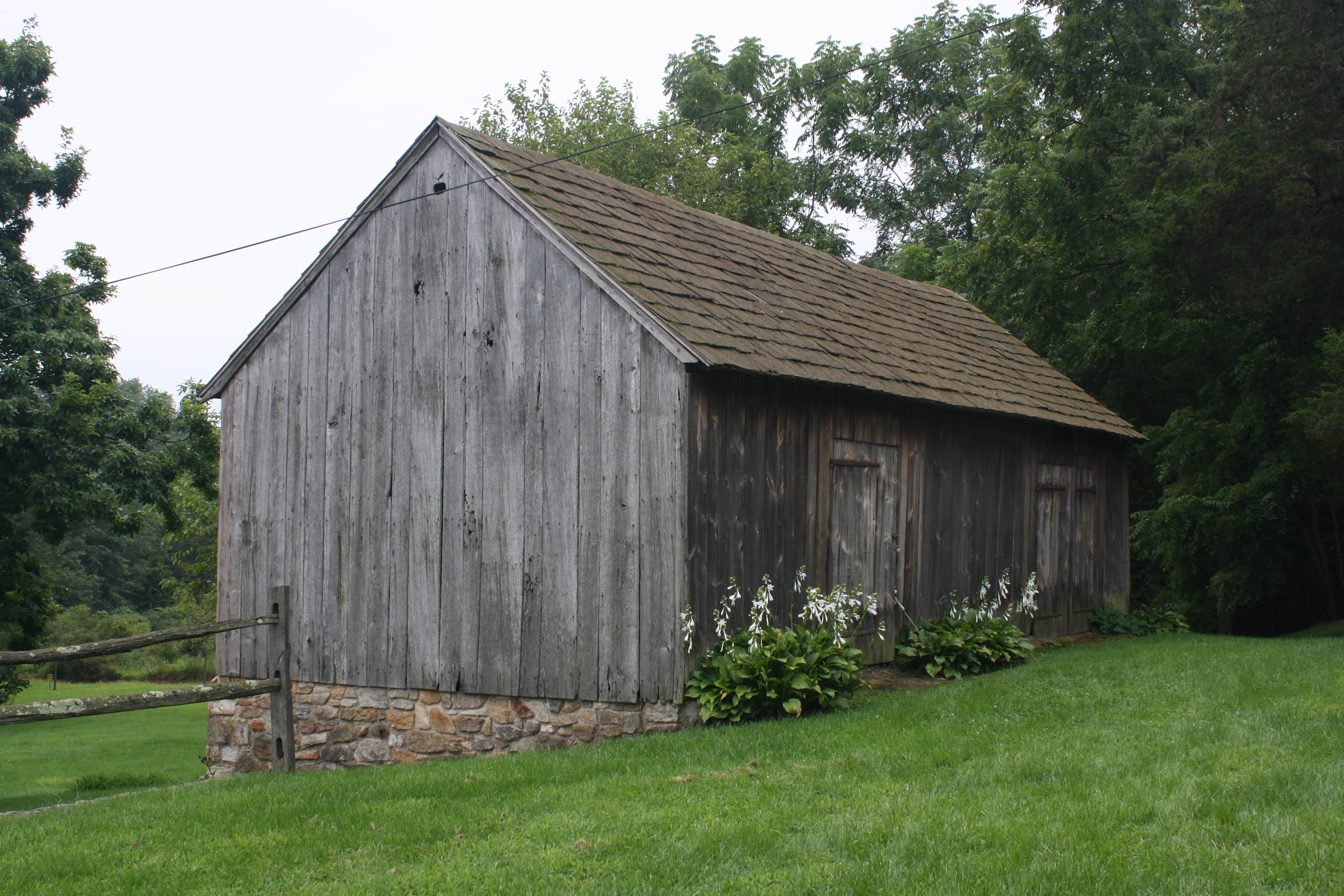
- Hartman Cider Press. August 2013.

- Location within Pennsylvania Location within the United States
- Location: Keim Road, 1.1 miles (1.8 km) west of Lobachsville, Pike Township, Pennsylvania
- Coordinates: 40°24′39″N 75°44′58″W
- Area: less than one acre
- Built: 1835
- NRHP reference No.: 87002205
- Added to NRHP: January 7, 1988

The Hartman Cider Press is an historic cider press which is located in Pike Township, Berks County, Pennsylvania.

It was listed on the National Register of Historic Places in 1988.

== History and architectural features ==
The cider press and one-story, plain, wood-frame building sits on a stone foundation, and was built circa 1835. The building measures thirty-five feet by fifteen feet, and has a gable roof.

The cider press had been in the Hartman family for five generations. It was donated by Edward Hartman and John Hartman to the American Folklore Society of Oley in March 1975. It was moved from its original location in Muhlenberg Township, 11 miles to the Keim Homestead in May 1975.
