= Gennaro Magri =

Italian dancer, choreographer, pedagogue, and writer

Gennaro Magri was an Italian dancer, choreographer, pedagogue, and writer. Although the exact dates of his birth and death are unknown, it is assumed that Magri was born in Naples, Italy during the 1730s, and died in Madrid. Magri is best known for his work surrounding grotesque dance, a style of theatrical dance characterized by comedy, athleticism and acrobatics, whose roots lie in the Italian street tradition of Commedia dell'arte.

== Career ==
Although very few records exist regarding Gennaro Magri's early life, it is assumed that his early training occurred in his home city of Naples, Italy. The first known record of Magri's dance career dates to 1758, where he performed as a principal dancer, or primo ballerino grottesco, at the Teatro Nuovo dell’Accademia Filarmonica in Verona.

Following his time as a dancer in Verona, Magri's career expanded to the international stage. From 1759 to 1760, Magri danced with the Kärntnertortheater ballet company, a prestigious Viennese company replete with dancers from across Europe, especially Italy. Magri later returned to a second season in Vienna (1763–64), where he danced in court operas, as well as ballets. Many of the choreographic constructs found in the Kärntnertortheater's productions proved formative to Magri's later work as a choreographer and pedagogue, such as the powerful relationship between dance and pantomime, and the importance of geographic location in creating a work. Throughout his itinerant career, Magri interacted with a variety of geographically and choreographically diverse influencers of the dance world who shaped his own choreographic style significantly.

Despite the international scope of his career, Magri spent much of his time as a dancer and choreographer in his homeland of Italy. Following his first and second seasons in Vienna, Magri spent time as a grotesque dancer for Padua's Teatro Nuovo (1760, 1761, 1762, 1764), Venice's Teatro San Angelo (1760–61, 1764), Rome's Teatro Argentina (1761–62), Reggio Emilia's Teatro Publicco (1761–62), Florence's Teatro Pergola (1764), and Turin's Teatro Regio (1762–65, 1767–78). During this time, Magri began to choreograph pieces of his own, most notably during his stay in Venice. After Magri's second season dancing in Vienna, he returned to Naples, and choreographed multiple ballets at the Teatro San Carlo (1765–66, 1766–67, 1768–74) that showcased the wide range of virtuosic steps found in the grotesque repertoire. Many of these works were entr’acte ballets, performed between the acts of an opera with an unrelated plot. Magri then traveled to Milan, where he performed grotesque roles at the prestigious Regio Ducal Teatro (1767). During this time, Magri married the Milanese prima ballerina Teresa Stafani, although the exact date of their marriage is unknown. Magri continued to perform throughout Italy before returning to Naples in 1773. There is no record of Magri performing or choreographing after 1774, although he published a highly influential treatise on grotesque dance, Trattato teorico-prattico di ballo, in 1779.

== Major works ==
Magri is perhaps best known for his treatise on grotesque dance (1779). This work provides a detailed description of the virtuosic and athletic steps required of a ballerino grottesco, and analyzes the movements that facilitate the execution of steps such as caprioles, pirouettes and other types of intricate footwork. In addition, this treatise distinguishes between different types of theatrical dancers: ballerini seri (serious dancers), mezzo carattere (character dancers), and ballerini grotteschi (grotesque dancers). Although grotesque dance is characterized by humorous and athletic stock characters, a defining feature of Magri's Trattato is the fact that he presents the ballerini grotteschi as equally important and esteemed as the ballerini seri. On this Trattato, see the recent research led by A. B. Fabbricatore. In terms of choreography, Magri primarily created entr'acte ballets performed between opera acts.

=== Choreographic works ===
Choreographic works are as follows:

- Mascherata dedicata a Bacco (1761)
- Mercato del pesce in Amsterdam (1765)
- Ritorno di soldati piemontesi alle loro case (1765)
- Arrivo de viaggiatori nella posta di Vienna (1765)
- Di diversi caratteri (1765)
- Di spagnoli e mori (1766)
- Di zingari e scozzesi (1766)
- Daglia amici di Rodrigo (1766)
- Ballo di mestieri (1766)
- Festa di silvano (1766)
- Festa da ballo (ballo analogo) (1767)
- Un bassa turco (1767)
- Pantomimo tra Pulcinella, Alrecchino e Coviello (1767)
- La Festa della lanterna (1773)
- Pantomino con maschere: Pantalone e sua figlia, Truffaldino, Pulcinella, Flaminia (1774)
