= Keim Homestead =

Historic house in Pennsylvania, United States

- U.S. National Register of Historic Places
- U.S. National Historic Landmark
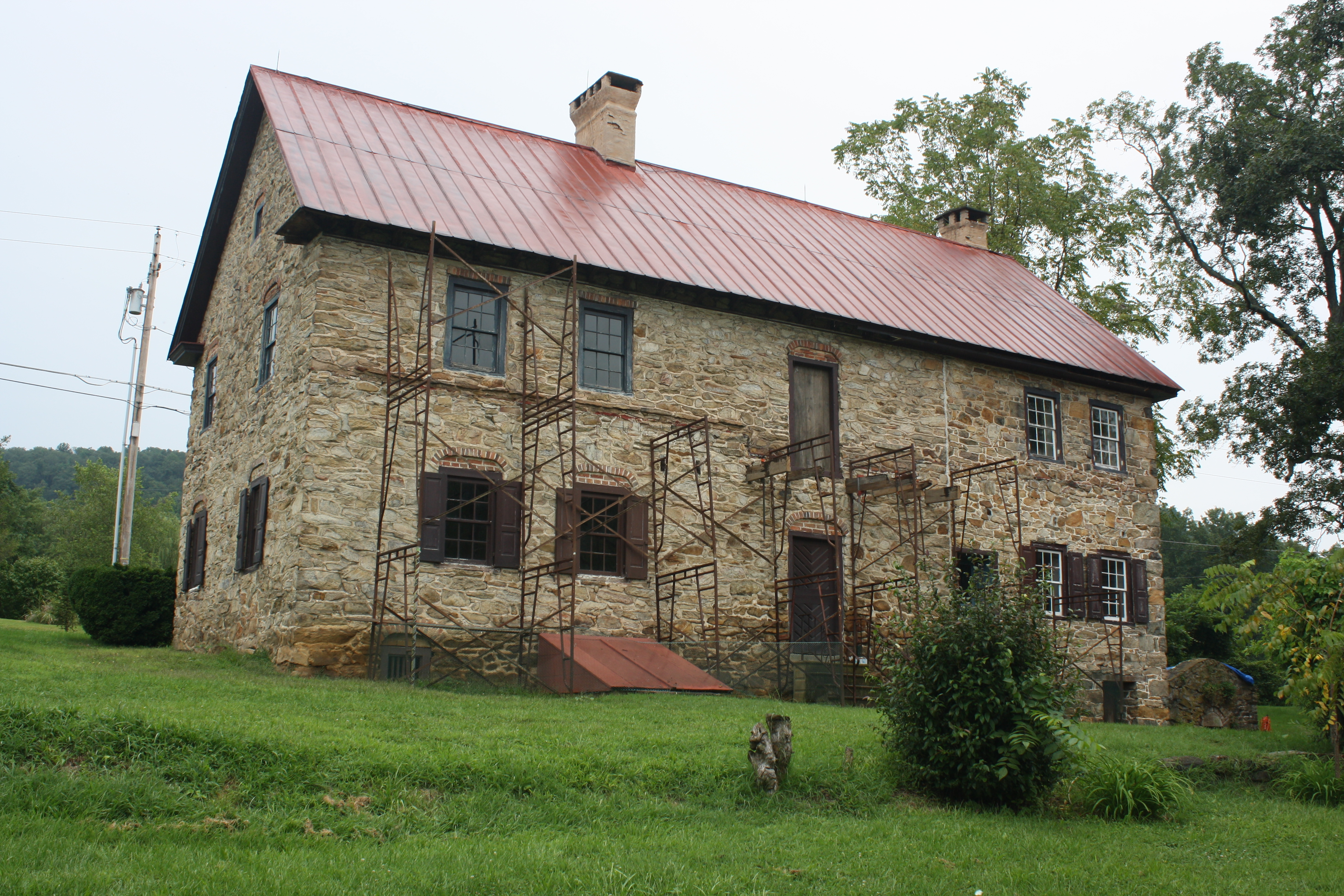
- Keim Homestead. August 2013.

- Location within Pennsylvania Location within the United States
- Location: West of Lobachsville, Pike Township, Pennsylvania
- Coordinates: 40°24′41″N 75°44′54″W
- Area: 20 acres (8.1 ha)
- Built: 1750
- Architect: Keim, Johannes; Keim, Jacob
- Architectural style: Germanic Influence
- NRHP reference No.: 74001752

Significant dates
- Added to NRHP: May 01, 1974
- Designated NHL: December 23, 2016

The Keim Homestead is a historic farm on Boyer Road in Pike Township, Berks County, Pennsylvania. It was built in 1753 for Jacob Keim and his wife Magdalena Hoch on land given to the couple by her father. Jacob was the son of Johannes Keim, who immigrated from Germany in 1689 and scouted the Pennsylvania countryside for land that was similar in richness to the soil from the Black Forest of Germany. He thought he found it and returned to Germany, married his wife, Katarina. They came to America in 1707. Keim originally built a log structure for his family's housing and later a stone home along Keim Road in Pike Township. The main section of the Jacob and Magdelena Keim house on Boyer Road was built in two phases and it is, "replete with early German construction features ... including[an] extremely original second floor Chevron door." The exterior building material (cladding) is limestone. The finishings and trimmings are mostly original to the house; relatively unusual in a home of this period.

The Historic Preservation Trust of Berks County describes the house in this way:

It is a two and a half story limestone structure. The building originally had a red clay tile roof but currently is covered by a standing metal seam roof. The walk-in fireplaces and much of the woodwork and hardware are intact. The foundation and walls are made of native limestone. It is a stove-room house with facades that have a balanced look and interiors illuminated by many windows. A stove-room house has a three room first floor plan that includes a kitchen on one side of a centrally located fireplace and a "stove" room or family space and a bedroom on the opposite side of this fireplace. The central stone chimney is capped by a brick section which protrudes the roof line. The original house block has segmented arches over all exterior openings.

There have been subsequent additions to the house, especially porches in later centuries. The Hartman Cider Press was moved from its original location in Muhlenberg Township, 11 miles to the Keim Homestead in 1975.

The Keim Homestead was listed on the National Register of Historic Places in 1974. It was designated a National Historic Landmark in 2016 as a nationally significant example of German colonial architecture.

== See also ==
- National Register of Historic Places listings in Berks County, Pennsylvania
- List of National Historic Landmarks in Pennsylvania
