= Margrethe Schall =

Danish ballerina (1775–1852)

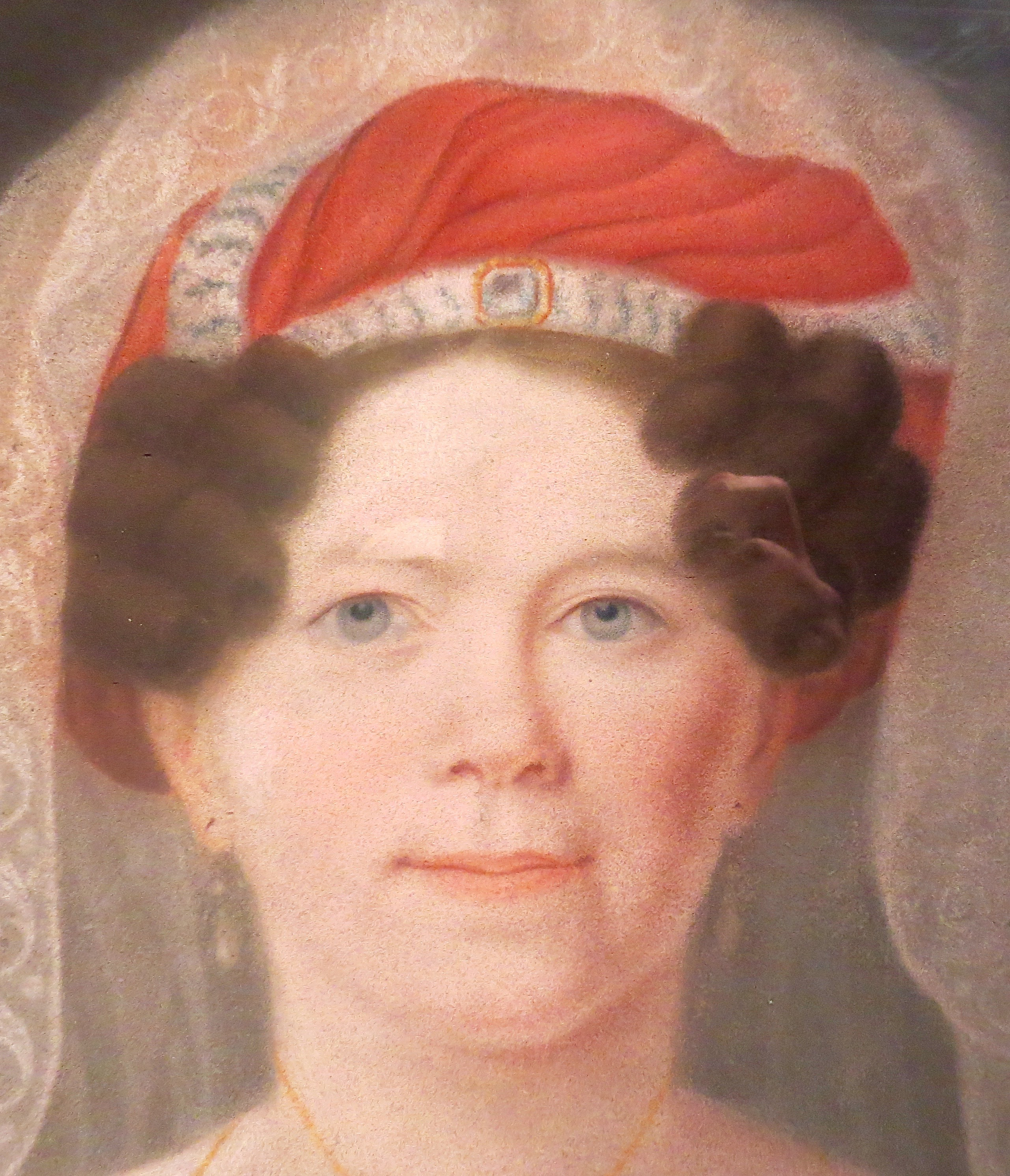
- Portrait of Anna Margrethe Schall by Niels Bredal, 1827
- Born: Anna Margrethe Scheuther; September 17, 1775; Copenhagen, Denmark
- Died: November 24, 1852 (aged 77); Frederiksberg, Denmark
- Resting place: Assistens Cemetery
- Spouse: Andreas Schall (m. 1795; div. 1796)

Anna Margrethe Schall (17 September 1775 – 24 November 1852) was a Danish ballerina. She was one of the most notable ballet dancers in Denmark at the turn of the 19th century.

Schall became a star of the Royal Danish Ballet under the leadership of Vincenzo Galeotti. She was not described as beautiful or technically skilful, but was rather admired for her swiftness and expressive mimique, the later of which made her perfect for the style of the Galeotti Ballet.

== Early life and education ==
Anna Margrethe Scheuther was born on 17 September 1775 in Copenhagen, Denmark. She was the daughter of the sailor Rasmus Schleuther and Anna Kirstine Mortensdatter. She became a student in the Royal Danish Ballet school in 1787.

== Career ==
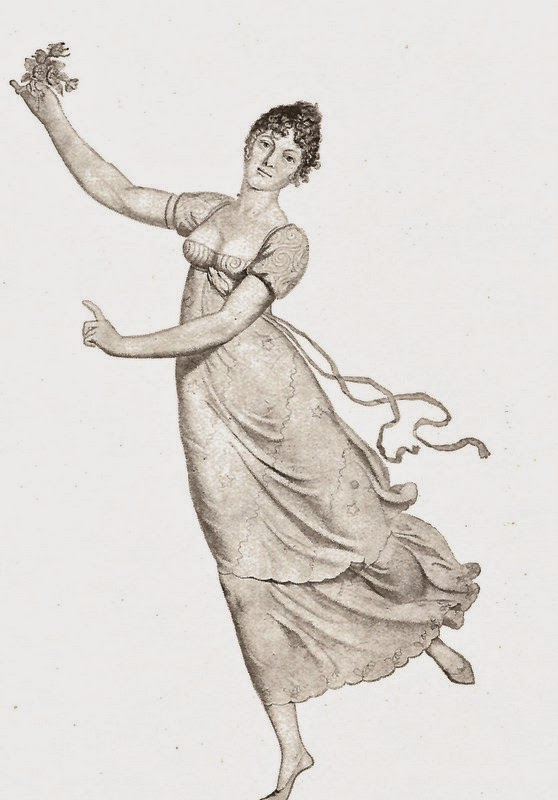
Illustration of Schall in Nina or the Lunatic of Love, 1860

In 1798, Schall was appointed a solo dancer at the Royal Danish Ballet. Initially, she distinguished herself in comedic roles, becoming known as a "grotesque dancer", within comedy ballet. She eventually grew into more mature roles, such as Hertha in Lagertha (1811) and Isaura in Rolf Blaaskæg (1817). The leading role in Galeotti's play Nina or the Lunatic of Love (Danish: Nina eller den vanvittige af Kierlighed) was composed by Claus Schall (her brother-in-law) with her specifically in mind. When the play debuted in 1802 it was the greatest success of her career. The role so closely fit her abilities, that even when she performed it for the final time at the age of 49, critics noted that she was still able to convincingly play 16-year-old Nina.

Historian Erich Christian Werlauff believed that she and Galeotti had a relationship for many years. After his death in 1816, her position as a leading figure in the ballet faded, though she continued to perform. Schall allegedly also had an affair with Prime Minister Frederik Julius Kaas, who often visited her dressing room after her performances. It is believed that it was through Kaas' influence that Schall managed to continue performing in the ballet after Galeotti's death—long after other ballerinas of her age had been forced to retire. It was only after Kaas himself died in 1827 that Schall retired. She left the Royal Ballet at the age of 52, having performed there for 40 years.

== Personal life ==
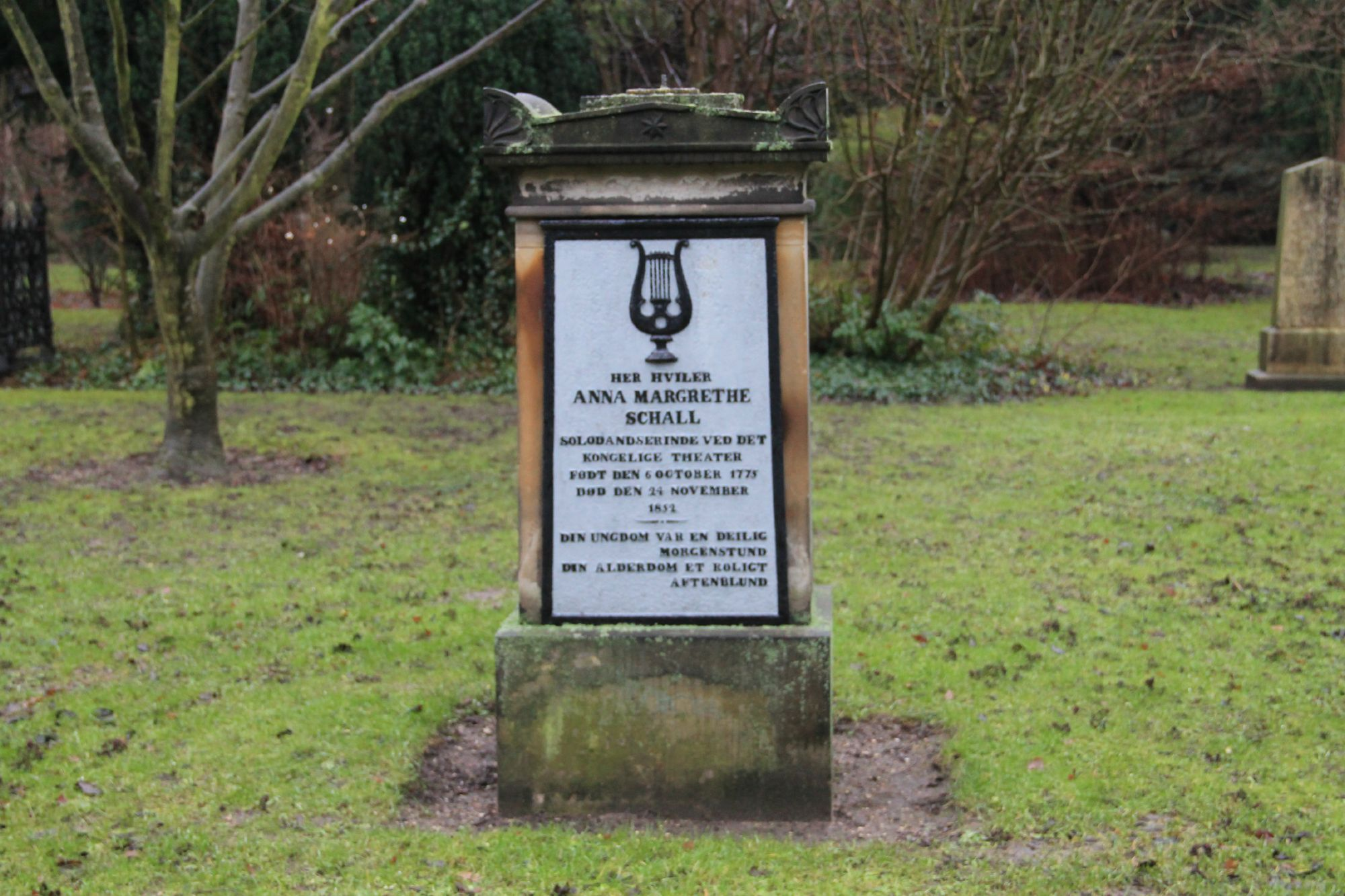
Anna Margrethe Schall's tomb at Assistens Cemetery in Copenhagen.

She married violinist Andreas Schall (1772–1810) on 16 December 1795, though they divorced the very next year. According to some sources, the marriage failed only a few days after their wedding.

In 1820, a young Hans Christian Andersen presented himself at Schall's doorstep, hoping to audition for a career on the stage. Her maid, initially believing that he was a beggar offered him change and asked him to be on his way. Eventually persuading the staff to give him an audience with Schall, he performed for her to little success. Believing him to be mad, she had him thrown out.

Following her retirement in 1827, she is said to have lived a quiet, philanthropic life. She died on 24 November 1852 in Copenhagen and is buried in Assistens Cemetery.
