= Yoder Mill =

- U.S. National Register of Historic Places
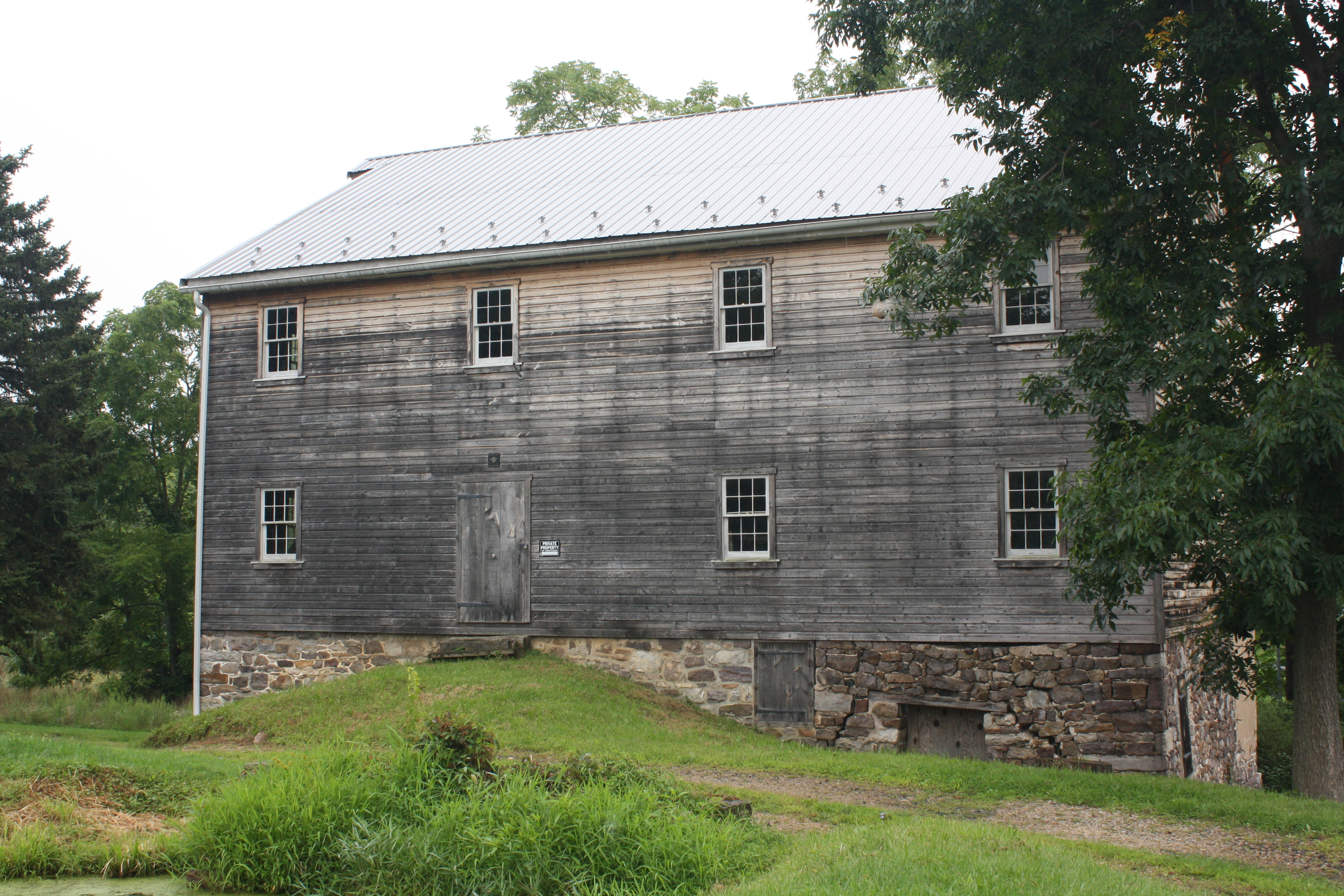
- Yoder Mill. August 2013.

- Location within Pennsylvania Location within the United States
- Location: Yoder Rd. at Oysterville Cr., Pike Township, Pennsylvania
- Coordinates: 40°23′48″N 75°43′14″W
- Area: 13 acres (5.3 ha)
- Built: 1796, c. 1885
- Architectural style: Gristmill
- MPS: Gristmills in Berks County MPS
- NRHP reference No.: 90001636
- Added to NRHP: November 8, 1990

The Yoder Mill, also known as the Renninger Mill, is an historic grist mill in Pike Township, Berks County, Pennsylvania, United States.

It was listed on the National Register of Historic Places in 1990.

== History and architectural features ==
Built in 1796, this mill is a 2 1/2-story, frame building, which measures forty-one feet by fifty feet and sits on a stone basement. It was rebuilt in 1885 after a fire.

Also located on the property is a contributing, 2 1/2-story, stuccoed, stone miller's house (c. 1885), the headrace and a millpond. The merchant mill ceased operation during the 1940s.

== Gallery ==
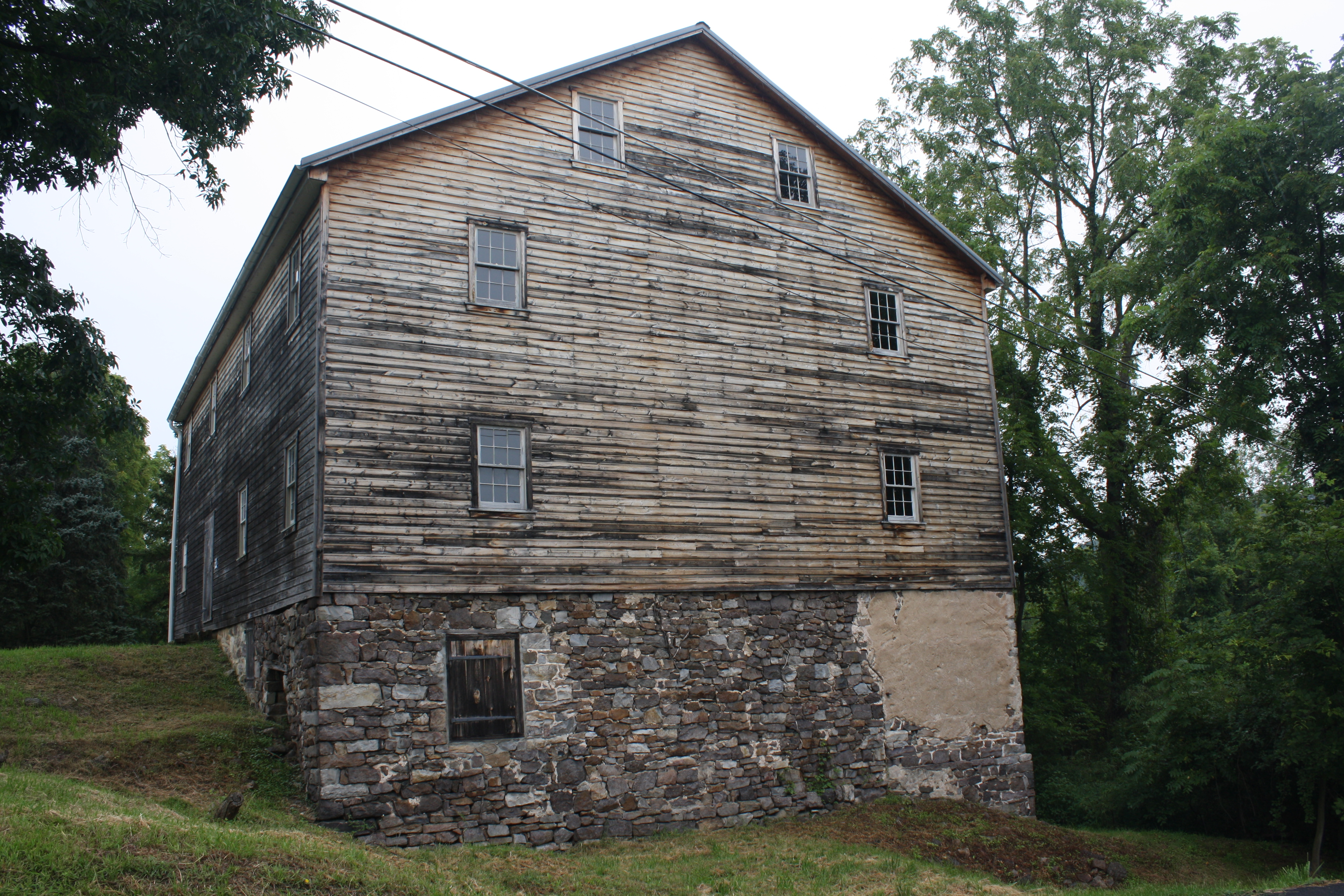
Mill, south side

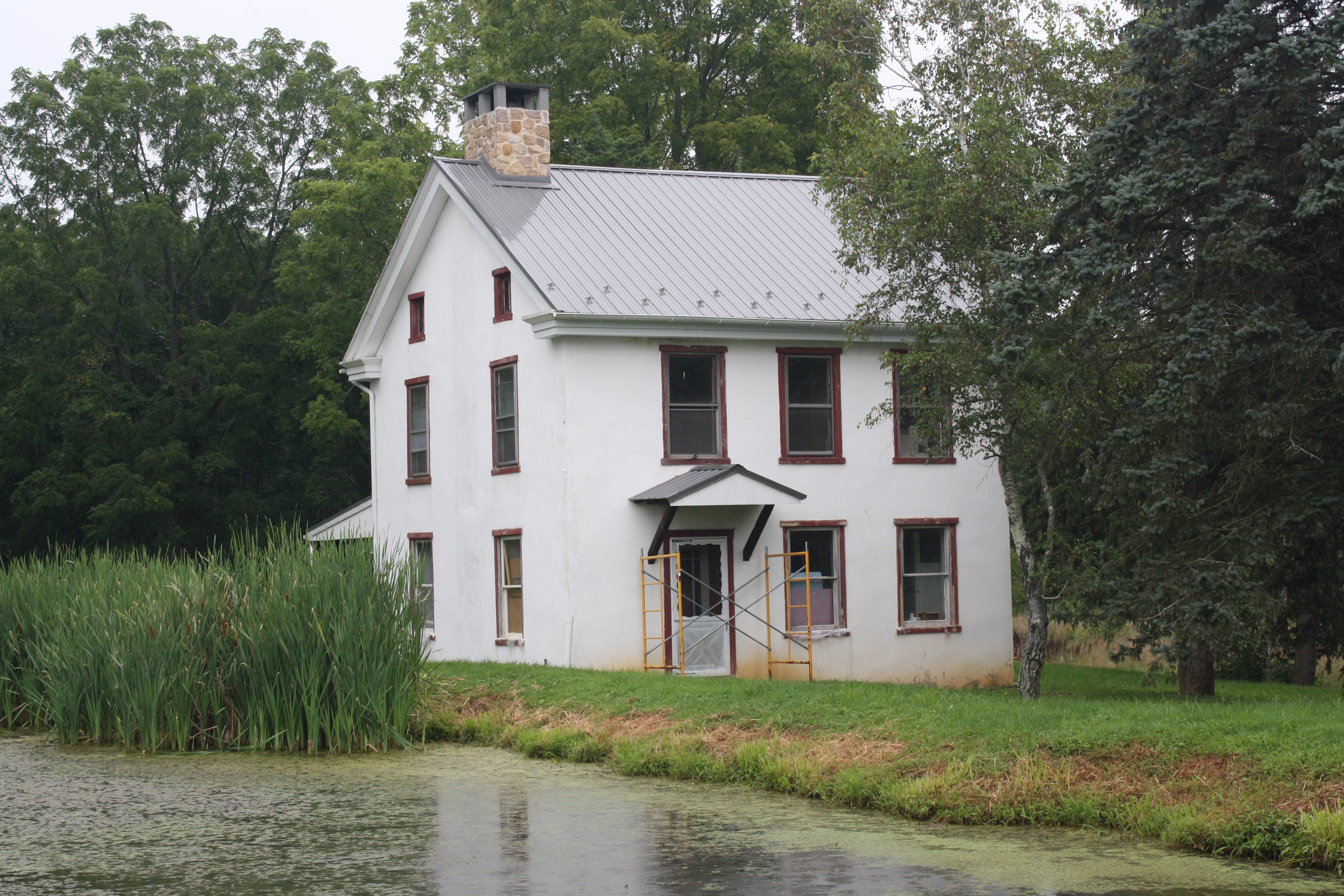
Miller's House
