= Antimasque =

Dance

An antimasque (also spelled antemasque) is a comic or grotesque dance presented before or between the acts of a masque, a type of dramatic composition. The antimasque is a spectacle of disorder which usually starts or precedes the masque itself and was played by professional actors while members of the court primarily performed the roles of the masque. It is characterized by impropriety and is transformed by the masque into goodness, propriety, and order, typically by the King's presence alone. It was also contrasted with the masque by the use of the lower class as characters. This then was supposed to harmonize with the king and the higher class. In later years, the antimasque developed into a farce or pantomime. The concept of the antemasque, or anti-masque, was originated by Ben Jonson. Masques originally usually had one antemasque before the main masque, but later it became common to have several antemasques preceding the main masque.
