= George Schall =

American politician (1768–1831)

George Schall Jr.

Member of the Pennsylvania Senate
- In office 1825–1828
- Constituency: Berks and Schuylkill counties

Personal details
- Born: December 26, 1768 Pike Township, Berks County, Pennsylvania, British America
- Died: May 22, 1831 (aged 62) Pike Township, Berks County, Pennsylvania, U.S.
- Resting place: Church Union Cemetery; Boyertown, Pennsylvania, U.S.
- Party: Democratic
- Spouse: Catharine Oyster (m. 1789)
- Children: 9
- Occupation: Politician; farmer; blacksmith

George Schall Jr. (December 26, 1768 – May 22, 1831) was an American politician from Pennsylvania.

== Early life ==
George Schall Jr. was born on December 26, 1768, in Pike Township, Berks County, Pennsylvania, to Catherine (née Newhard or Neuhard) and George Schall. His father immigrated from Germany and served in the Revolutionary War.

== Career ==
Schall worked as a farmer and blacksmith. In 1796, he built a grist and saw mill on the Schall homestead.

Schall was a Democrat. He served as a member of the Pennsylvania Senate, representing Berks and Schuylkill counties from 1824 to 1828.

== Personal life ==
Schall married Catharine Oyster on November 10, 1789. His wife died in 1846. They had nine children, David (1790–1792), George, John, Hannah, Catharine, David (1801–1877), Mary, William (1805–1805) and William (born 1810). His sixth child, David, served as associate judge of Berks County and his grandson William A. Schall served in the Civil War. He was a member of the Reformed Church.

Schall died on May 22, 1831, in Pike Township. He was buried in Church Union Cemetery in Boyertown.
