= Johan Frederik Møller =

Danish painter and photographer

- Born: 20 August 1797; Helsingør
- Died: 14 October 1871 (aged 74); Copenhagen
- Education: Royal Danish Academy of Fine Arts
- Known for: Painting

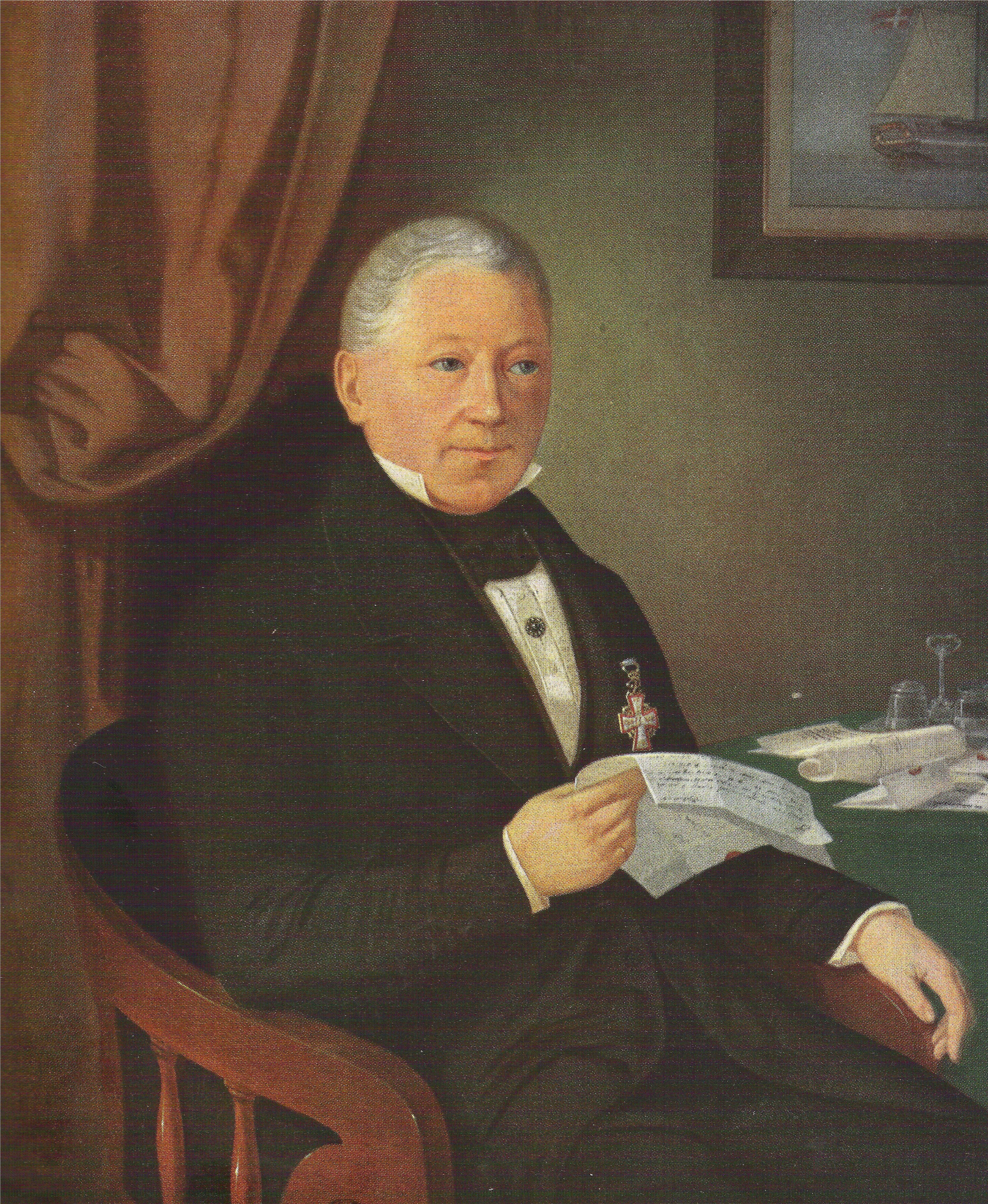
Portrait of Jacob Holm by Johan Frederik Møller, 1834

Johan Frederik Møller, also J. F. Møller, (20 August 1797 - 14 October 1871) was a Danish painter and photographer.

== Biography ==
Møller was born in Helsingør. He was the son of Peter Møller and Christine Olsdatter. His father was a customs officer. He trained as a clerk at the District office in Aarhus, and in 1824 trained as a portrait painter at the Royal Danish Academy of Fine Arts. He exhibited at the Charlottenborg Spring Exhibition between 1828 and 1867.

Møller primarily painted portraits. Notable portraits included those of Crown Prince Frederik Carl Christian (1836, Jægerspris Castle), author Hans Christian Andersen (1847), playwright Adam Oehlenschläger (1830, Frederiksborg Museum), industrialist Jacob Holm and opera soprano Eleonora Zrza.

He served in 1844 as daguerreotypist in Elsinore, and in 1850 as a photographer, both in Elsinore and Copenhagen.

He was married in 1834 to Emilie Albertine Martens (1810-1882). He was the father of Johan Christian Møller (1835-1902) who became Head of the Army Medical Corps and in 1895 served as Surgeon General.

Johan Frederik Møller died in Copenhagen and was buried in Assistants Cemetery.
