= Pike Township, Berks County, Pennsylvania =

Township in Pennsylvania, US

Pike Township
- Township
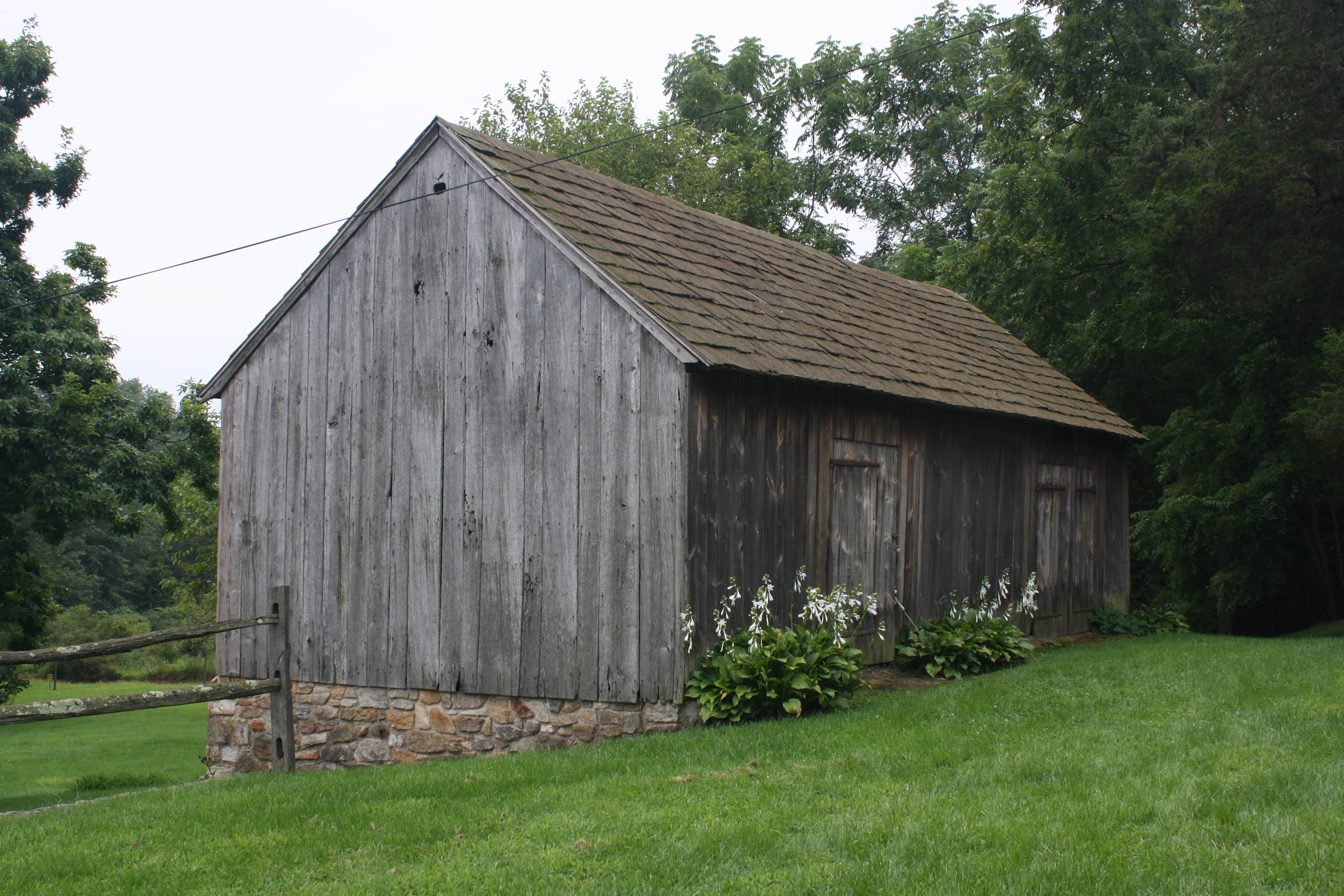
- Hartman Cider Press

- Location of Pike Township in Pennsylvania Pike Township (the United States)
- Coordinates: 40°24′38″N 75°45′00″W
- Country: United States
- State: Pennsylvania
- County: Berks

Area
  - Total: 14.02 sq mi (36.32 km^{2})
  - Land: 13.98 sq mi (36.22 km^{2})
  - Water: 0.039 sq mi (0.10 km^{2})
- Elevation: 413 ft (126 m)

Population (2010)
  - Total: 1,723
  - Estimate (2016): 1,749
  - Density: 125.0/sq mi (48.28/km^{2})
- Time zone: UTC-5 (EST)
  - Summer (DST): UTC-4 (EDT)
- Area code: 610
- FIPS code: 42-011-60176

Pike Township is a township in Berks County, Pennsylvania, United States. The population was 1,723 at the 2010 census.

== History ==
Pike Township was created in August 1813 from sections of District, Rockland, Oley, and Earl townships.

The Hartman Cider Press, Keim Homestead, Mill at Lobachsville, and Yoder Mill are listed on the National Register of Historic Places.

== Geography ==
According to the United States Census Bureau, the township has a total area of 13.9 square miles (36.1 km^{2}), all land. It is drained by the Schuylkill River via the Manatawny Creek and the Swamp Creek. Its villages include Hill Church, Lobachsville, Pikeville, and Pine Waters.

Adjacent townships

- Rockland Township (northwest)
- District Township (northeast)
- Washington Township (east)
- Colebrookdale Township (southeast)
- Earl Township (south)
- Oley Township (west)

== Demographics ==
Historical population
Census	Pop.	Note	%±
1980	1,056		—
1990	1,359		28.7%
2000	1,677		23.4%
2010	1,723		2.7%
2016 (est.)	1,749		1.5%
Source: US Census Bureau

At the 2000 census there were 1,677 people, 605 households, and 474 families living in the township. The population density was 120.4 inhabitants per square mile (46.5/km^{2}). There were 627 housing units at an average density of 45.0 per square mile (17.4/km^{2}). The racial makeup of the township was 99.46% White, 0.18% African American, 0.06% Native American, 0.24% Asian, and 0.06% from two or more races. Hispanic or Latino of any race were 0.18%.

There were 605 households, 37.4% had children under the age of 18 living with them, 70.9% were married couples living together, 4.1% had a female householder with no husband present, and 21.5% were non-families. 16.5% of households were made up of individuals, and 6.3% were one person aged 65 or older. The average household size was 2.77 and the average family size was 3.13.

The age distribution was 26.7% under the age of 18, 5.8% from 18 to 24, 29.6% from 25 to 44, 28.0% from 45 to 64, and 9.9% 65 or older. The median age was 39 years. For every 100 females, there were 105.5 males. For every 100 females age 18 and over, there were 104.0 males.

The median household income was $58,036 and the median family income was $62,885. Males had a median income of $42,865 versus $26,354 for females. The per capita income for the township was $23,857. About 1.5% of families and 2.1% of the population were below the poverty line, including none of those under age 18 and 7.6% of those age 65 or over.

== Transportation ==
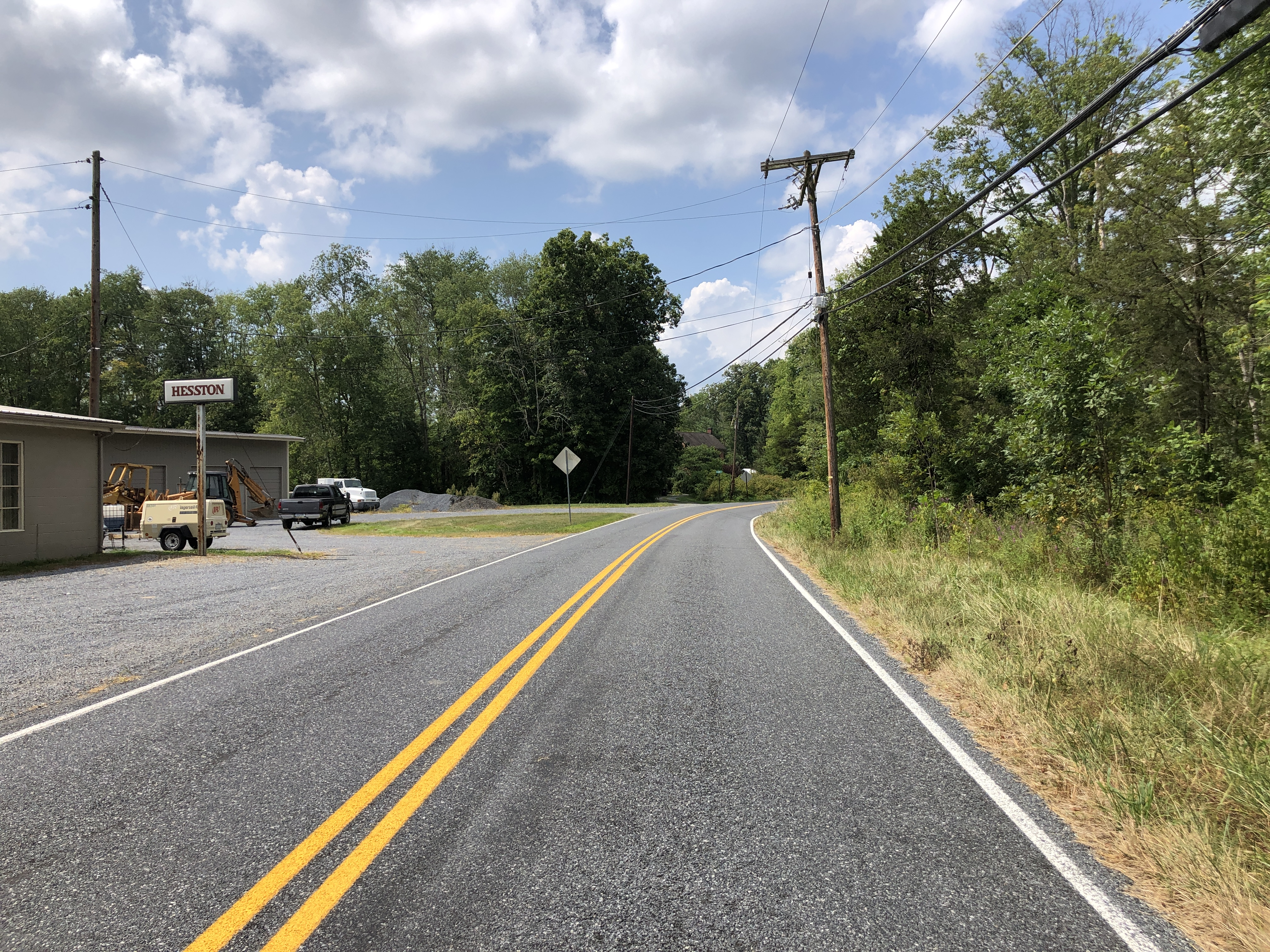
Lobachsville Road in Pike Township

As of 2019, there were 42.57 miles (68.51 km) of public roads in Pike Township, of which 14.34 miles (23.08 km) were maintained by the Pennsylvania Department of Transportation (PennDOT) and 28.23 miles (45.43 km) were maintained by the township.

No numbered highways pass through Pike Township. Main thoroughfares in the township include Bertolet Mill Road, Hill Church Road, Landis Store Road, Lobachsville Road, Long Lane and Oysterdale Road.
