= Det Danske Klasselotteri =

Det Danske Klasselotteri is a state-owned lottery in Denmark.

== History ==
The lottery was launched as the Royal Copenhagen Class Lottery by the Royal Orphanage (Det Kongelige Opfostringshjem) and authorized by Frederick V by royal resolution of 29 June 1753. The first lottery draw took place on 25 February 1754 at Charlottenborg Palace on Kongens Nytorv.

The Royal Orphanage was in 1771 deprived of its royal warrant by Johann Friedrich Struensee. Since 1 February 1771 it has been organized by the Danish government. Eggert Balthazar-Christensen (1885) was appointed as managing director of the lottery in 1936. It was based at Suomisvej 2 in 1950.

In 1921, it was converted into an aktieselskab under the name Danske Klasselotteri A/S.

== Today ==
In 2006, Det Danske Klasselotteri generated total revenues of DKK 650 million.

Two lotteries are arranged each year, one in April and one in October. Each lottery is divided into monthly renewals and draws (classes). 1/1, 1/2, 1/4 and 1/8 lottery tickets are available. The prize fund consists of 65% of the stakes.
