= Antoine Bournonville =

French ballet dancer and choreographer

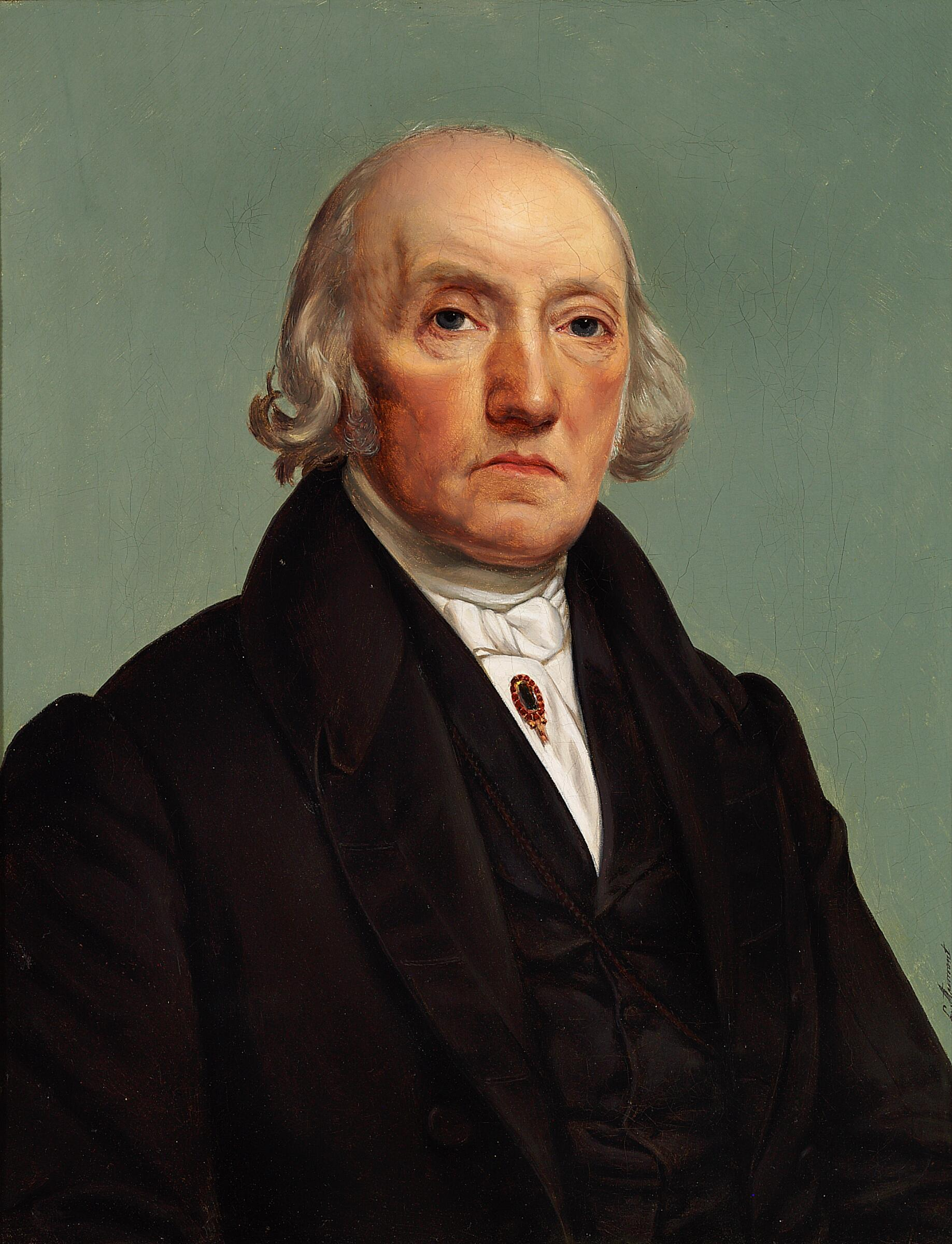
- Born: 19 May 1760; Lyon, France
- Died: 11 January 1843 (aged 82); Fredensborg, Denmark
- Known for: ballet dancer
- Spouses: Mariane Jensen; Lovisa Sundberg
- Children: August Bournonville

Antoine Bournonville (19 May 1760 – 11 January 1843) was a French ballet dancer and choreographer, active in the Royal Swedish Ballet and the Royal Danish Ballet and eventually ballet master in the latter. He is considered to have played a great role in the development of the ballet in Scandinavia. He was the father of August Bournonville.

== Early life ==
Bournonville was the son of the actors Louis-Amable Bournonville and Jeanne Evrard, born as the twin of his brother Guillame. He became the student of Jean Georges Noverre in 1769, at the age of nine, and toured in Vienna, Paris and London before he was employed in the Royal Swedish Ballet at the Royal Swedish Opera in Stockholm with his sister Julie Alix de la Fay in 1782.

== Career ==
=== Sweden ===
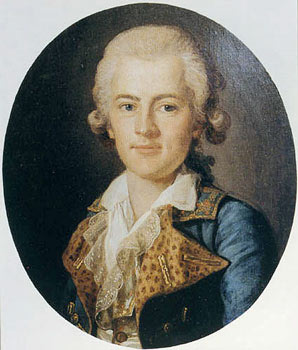
Portrait of Bournonville by Per Krafft the Elder, c. 1782–92

Bournonville was premier dancer and ballet instructor at the Royal Swedish Opera in Stockholm until 1792. During his time in Sweden, he was described as beautiful as Apollo: "His appearance was that of a true Apollo. On top of that he had a form of virtuosity in all kinds of dance, which he used with the finest taste". King Gustav III of Sweden was at one point so enthusiastic about his performance and beauty that he called out to him to untie the ribbon of his hair so that he could see his loose hair fly during his pirouette.

His favourite student and dancing partner in Sweden was Charlotte Slottsberg, with whom he made a successful pair in the ballets. It was Antoine Bournonville himself who asked to have her as his partner, after he recognized her talent as an artist and, in 1784, by his own initiative gave her a part in Les Meunieres Provencaux, which is considered to have been the starting point of Slottberg's true maturity as an artist. Charlotte Slottsberg was said to have been infatuated by his beauty, which at one occasion made her lover, Prince Charles to scream at Bournonville in his jealousy.

He was also active as an actor, a singer, and a choreographer. During his stay in Sweden he wrote the ballets Les Meuniers provençaux (1785) and Les Pêcheurs (1789).

=== Denmark ===
He left Sweden in 1792 after the assassination of king Gustav III of Sweden and was employed at the Royal Danish Ballet in Copenhagen in Denmark after a guest performance there. His favourite dance partner in Denmark was Marie Christine Björn. From 1816 to 1823, he was the ballet master of the Royal Danish Ballet.

== Private life ==
Bournonville was married first to the Danish dancer Mariane Jensen, second to his Swedish housekeeper Lovisa Sundberg (the mother of August Bournonville) and also had a child with the Danish dancer Karen Olsen.

He died on 11 January 1843 and is buried in Asminderød Churchyard in Fredensborg.
