= Vincenzo Galeotti =

Italian-born Danish dancer, choreographer and ballet master

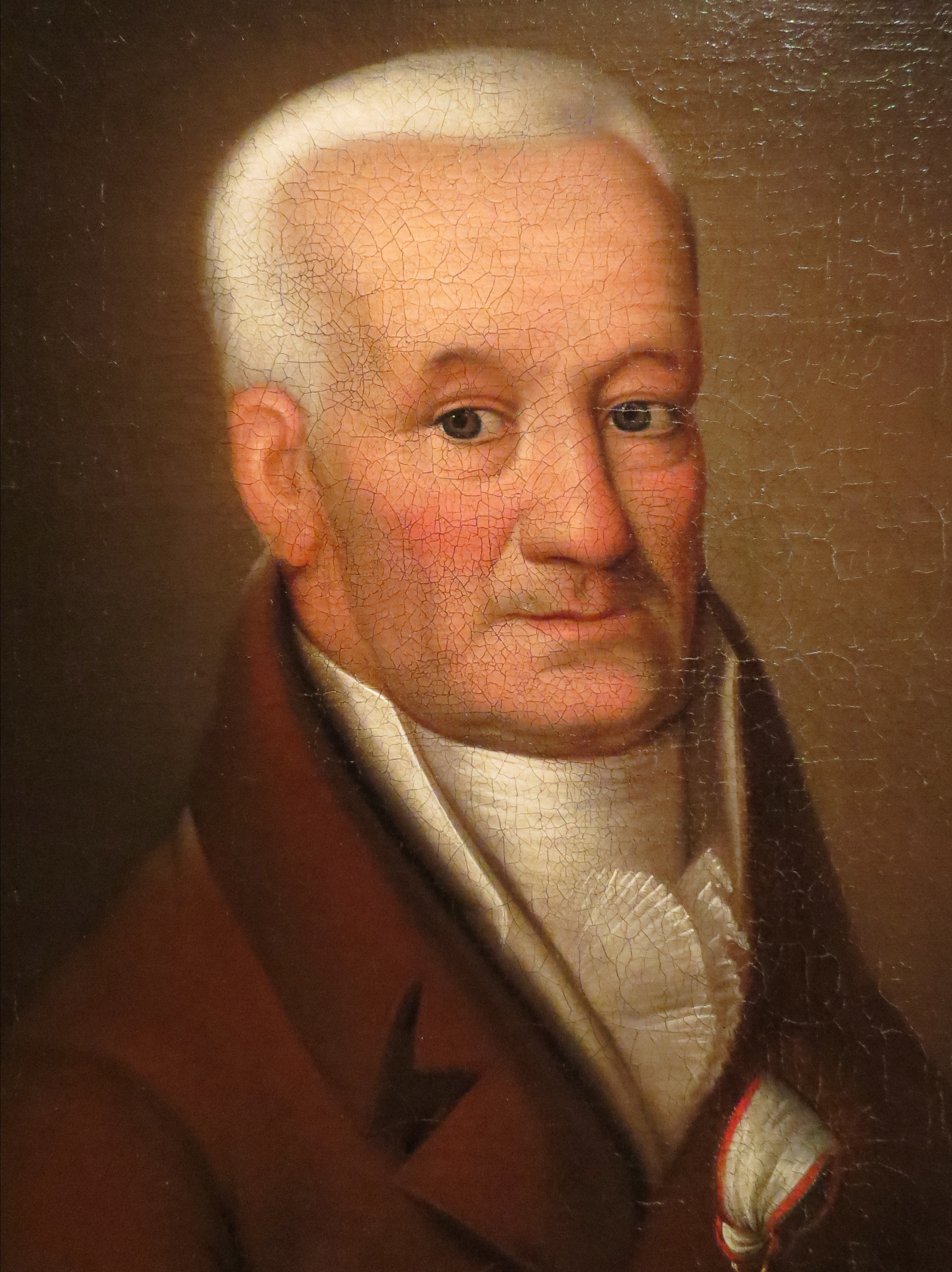
- Born: 5 March 1733; Florence, Grand Duchy of Tuscany
- Died: 16 December 1816 (aged 83); Copenhagen, Denmark
- Resting place: Assistens Cemetery, Copenhagen
- Occupations: Ballet master, choreographer

Vincenzo Galeotti (5 March 1733 – 16 December 1816) was an Italian-born Danish dancer, choreographer and ballet master, who was influential as the director of the Royal Danish Ballet from 1775 until his death.

== Life ==
Vincenzo Tomasselli was born in Florence. He studied medicine but then decided to be a dancer and was trained by Gasparo Angiolini, who was just two years older than Vincenzo. In 1759, he joined the company of Giuseppe Forti, which performed in Venice at the Teatro San Moisè, with the stage name Galeotti. In 1761, he joined the dance company of another Venice theatre, San Benedetto. In 1763, he married the principal dancer Antonia Guidi, who was trained in Stuttgart by Jean-Georges Noverre.

In 1765, at the Teatro San Benedetto, he choreographed his first works. Next season, he worked at the Teatro San Luca. In 1766–1767, the couple performed in Torino Opera and in 1767–1769 again in Venice, in San Benedetto. In 1769–1770 they were in London at the Haymarket Opera where Galeotti choreographed dances for Christoph Willibald Gluck's Orfeo ed Euridice. In 1771–1772 they worked in Milan under direction of Jean-Georges Noverre. In 1772–1773 they went back to Venice, to the Teatro San Moisè and in 1773, moved to Genoa.

In 1775, Galeotti was called to Copenhagen to assume the directorship of the Royal Danish Ballet, replacing another Italian, Antonio Sacco. His wife Antonia entered the company a year later but soon left the stage in order to teach. Galeotti remained in Copenhagen for the rest of his life, obtaining Danish citizenship and a lifetime directorship in 1781. Galeotti continued to perform in mime roles until 1812. In that year, very unusually for a performing artist, he was made a Knight of the Order of the Dannebrog. In 1814, he was also awarded a titulary professorship.

Galeotti was the teacher of the noted ballerina Anine Frølich, making her the star of his innovative choreography. They were also romantically involved, but the relationship ended unhappily.

== Works ==
Galeotti was a leading innovator of ballet in Scandinavia and was instrumental in introducing the Ballet d'action to Denmark. He created the first ballet with a Nordic subject (Lagertha, 1801, based on the legendary Viking shieldmaiden), as well as the first choreographies inspired by William Shakespeare (Romeo and Juliet, 1811, and Macbeth, 1816), with music written by Claus Schall.

He created more than 50 works, often adapting French tragedies or moral dramas for ballet. Galeotti's most lasting success, and the only work by him still commonly performed today, is Amors og Balletmesterens Luner (The Whims of Cupid and the Ballet Master, 1786), which is the oldest European ballet still danced to its original choreography and music (by Jens Lolle); it has been staged more than 500 times.
