= Claus Schall =

Danish violinist and composer

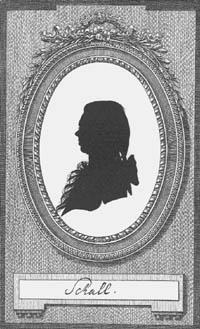
Claus Schall

Claus Nielsen Schall (28 April 1757 – 10 August 1835) was a Danish violinist and composer living much of his life as a subject of Denmark–Norway.

== Life and career ==
Niels Pedersen Schall's father, initially a cobbler's apprentice, later established his own dance school. His mother was Christiane Pedersdatter, née Salling. He had two brothers, Andreas Schall and Peder Schall, who were also musicians.

=== Early years ===
His father, keen on involving him in dance, arranged violin lessons for him. Later, he briefly worked in an office but found it unsuitable. In 1772, he independently enrolled in the Theatre's dance school, becoming a supernumerary in 1773. Engaging in ballets, he had the opportunity to hear various pieces of music, which he memorized on the violin due to his excellent musical memory. He supported himself by teaching dance in Roskilde and Holbæk during summers and giving music lessons in Copenhagen during winters.

In 1776, during a rehearsal for the ballet "Kongen paa Jagt," the rehearsal director fell ill, and the key to the music cabinet was misplaced. Schall played the entire music from memory and even conducted the ballet that evening when no violinist from the orchestra dared to lead due to unfamiliarity with the tempos. This incident brought him attention, leading to his appointment as a rehearsal director later that year.

=== Early Composer Career ===
In 1778, Schall composed most of the melodies for the ballet The Peasants and the Gentlemen at the Manor, orchestrated by Scalabrini. He also wrote themes with variations for the violin, an instrument in which he had become proficient enough to perform solo, earning a place in the orchestra by 1779. On August 27 of that year, he married the actress Catharina Margarethe Salathé (born April 4, 1755).

In 1780, when Vincenzo Galeotti planned to compose The Power of Love and Suspicion, he encouraged Schall to write the music, which received general acclaim. However, this prompted Schall to acknowledge his lack of formal theory and composition knowledge, leading him to seek guidance from concertmaster Johann Hartmann.

While Hartmann could not spare many hours due to age, Schall later received further instruction from Schulz. Nevertheless, his primary education was through self-study; he never gained a deep understanding of music theory, and Kuhlau's critique that "he couldn't write 8 bars without error" was not entirely unfounded. From then on, however, he became the most sought-after ballet composer, producing music for numerous ballets, particularly those by Galeotti, such as The Savoyard Women (1781), The Washerwomen and the Kettle Repairer (1788), The Idol in Ceylon (1788), The Recruiter (1788), Annette and Lubin (1797), Lagertha (1801), Ines de Castro (1804), Rolf Bluebeard (1808), and Macbeth (1816), among others.

Though Schall's ballet music, known for its light and melodious style, significantly enhanced his reputation, it has largely faded into obscurity alongside the ballets themselves. For its time, it represented a notable advancement from earlier ballet music due to its liveliness and character. Less successful, however, were Schall's ventures into opera composition. His initial work, Claudina of Villa Bella (1787), received little acclaim, and subsequent efforts like The Chinamen (1792), The Evening (1795), The Canon in Milan (1802), Niels Lembak (1804), and Alma and Elfride (1813) did not achieve significant recognition.

== Notable works ==
- Bønderne og herrerne på lystgården (ballet 1778)
- Kjærlighedens og Mistankens Magt (ballet 1780)
- Savoyardinderne (ballet 1781)
- Andante Con Variattioni pour le Violin (1786)
- Claudina af Villa bella (syngespil 1787)
- Vaskepigerne og Kjedelflikkeren (ballet 1788)
- Afguden paa Ceylon (ballet 1788)
- Hververen (ballet 1788)
- Arier, Viser, Sange og andre smaa Haandstykker. 2. samling (1788)
- I Anledning af Indtoget (kantate 1790)
- Fredens og Bellonæ Trætte (kantate 1790)
- Fagotkoncert (1790)
- Kinafarerne (syngespil 1792)
- Aftenen (syngespil 1795)
- Annette og Lubin (ballet 1797)
- P.F. Suhms Minde (kantate 1798)
- Lagertha (ballet 1801)
- Domherren i Milano (syngespil 1802)
- Ines de Castro (ballet 1804)
- Niels Lembak (syngespil 1804)
- Rolf Blaaskjæg (ballet 1808)
- Romeo og Julie (ballet 1811)
- Alma og Elfride (syngespil 1813)
- Macbeth (ballet 1816)
- Armida (ballet 1821)
- Aaret (kantate 1825)

== See also ==
- List of Danish composers
- Free scores by Claus Schall at the International Music Score Library Project (IMSLP)
