= Jens Stoltenberg =

Norwegian politician (born 1959)

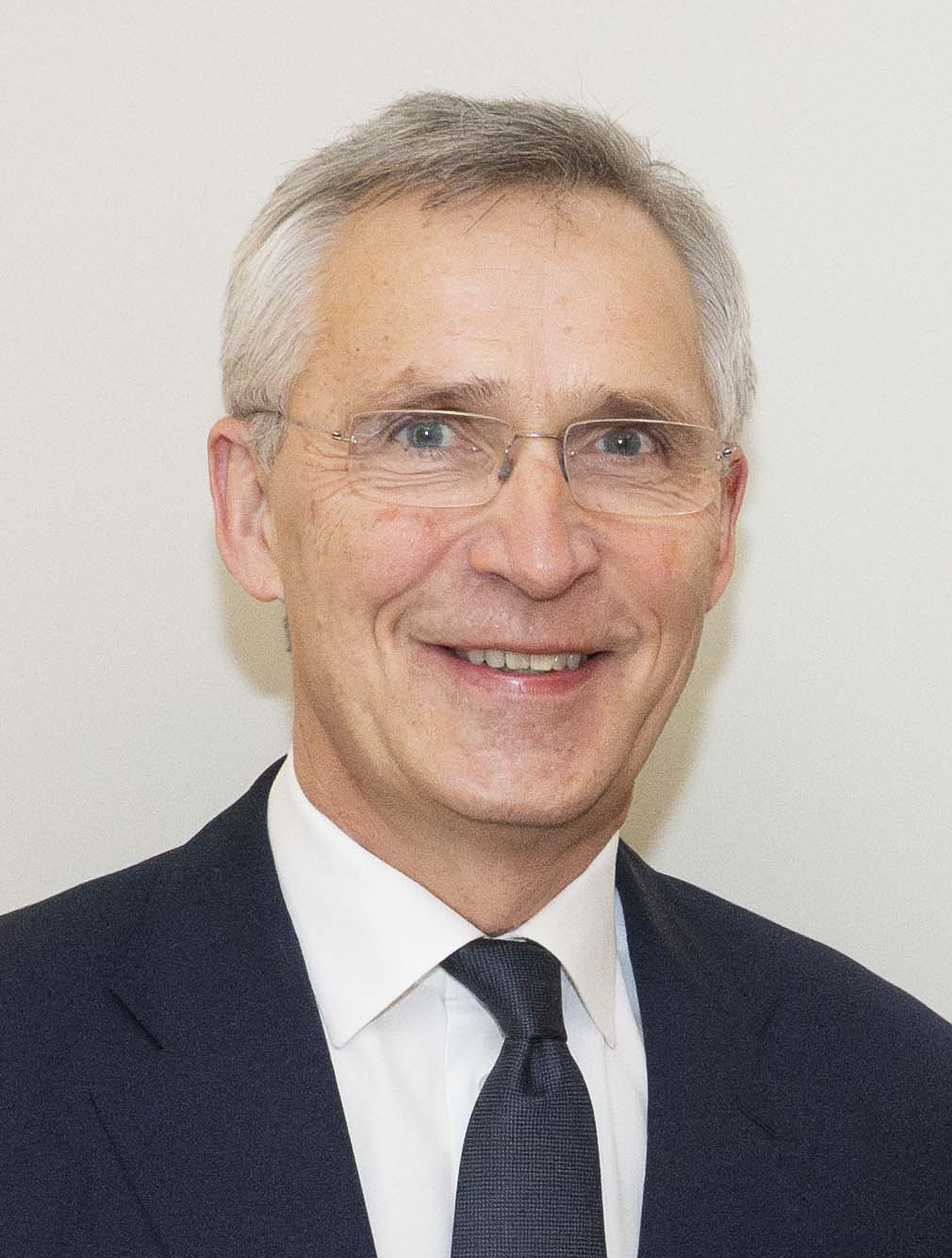
- Stoltenberg in 2025

Minister of Finance
- Incumbent
- Assumed office 4 February 2025
- Prime Minister: Jonas Gahr Støre
- Preceded by: Trygve Slagsvold Vedum
- In office 25 October 1996 – 17 October 1997
- Prime Minister: Thorbjørn Jagland
- Preceded by: Sigbjørn Johnsen
- Succeeded by: Gudmund Restad

13th Secretary General of NATO
- In office 1 October 2014 – 1 October 2024
- Deputy: Alexander Vershbow; Rose Gottemoeller; Mircea Geoană
- Preceded by: Anders Fogh Rasmussen
- Succeeded by: Mark Rutte

Prime Minister of Norway
- In office 17 October 2005 – 16 October 2013
- Monarch: Harald V
- Preceded by: Kjell Magne Bondevik
- Succeeded by: Erna Solberg
- In office 17 March 2000 – 19 October 2001
- Monarch: Harald V
- Preceded by: Kjell Magne Bondevik
- Succeeded by: Kjell Magne Bondevik

Leader of the Opposition
- In office 16 October 2013 – 14 June 2014
- Prime Minister: Erna Solberg
- Preceded by: Erna Solberg
- Succeeded by: Jonas Gahr Støre
- In office 19 October 2001 – 17 October 2005
- Prime Minister: Kjell Magne Bondevik
- Succeeded by: Erna Solberg

Leader of the Labour Party
- In office 10 November 2002 – 14 June 2014
- Deputy: Hill-Marta Solberg; Helga Pedersen
- Preceded by: Thorbjørn Jagland
- Succeeded by: Jonas Gahr Støre

Minister of Industry and Energy
- In office 7 October 1993 – 25 October 1996
- Prime Minister: Gro Harlem Brundtland
- Preceded by: Finn Kristensen (as Minister of Industry)
- Succeeded by: Grete Faremo (as Minister of Petroleum and Energy)

Member of the Norwegian Parliament
- In office 1 October 1993 – 30 September 2017
- Deputy: Anders Hornslien; Inger Lise Husøy; Ragnar Bøe Elgsaas; Truls Wickholm; Håkon Haugli
- Constituency: Oslo

Personal details
- Born: 16 March 1959 (age 67) Oslo, Norway
- Party: Labour
- Spouse: Ingrid Schulerud (m. 1987)
- Children: 2
- Parent(s): Karin Heiberg; Thorvald Stoltenberg
- Education: University of Oslo (Cand.oecon.)
- Awards: Order of Isabella the Catholic Presidential Medal of Freedom
- Website: Official Facebook

Military service
- Allegiance: Norway
- Branch/service: Norwegian Army

Jens Stoltenberg (Note: Norwegian pronunciation: [jɛns ˈstɔ̀ɫtn̩bærɡ]) (born 16 March 1959) is a Norwegian politician who has served as the minister of finance since 2025, a position he previously held from 1996 to 1997. A member of the Labour Party, he also served as the prime minister of Norway from 2000 to 2001 and 2005 to 2013, and secretary general of NATO from 2014 to 2024.

Jens Stoltenberg was born in Oslo to diplomat and politician Thorvald Stoltenberg and politician Karin Stoltenberg (née Heiberg). Stoltenberg attended Oslo Waldorf School and Oslo Cathedral School before graduating with a degree in economics from the University of Oslo in 1987. During his studies, he worked as a journalist, and led Labour's youth wing from 1985 to 1989.

Stoltenberg started his career in government as a state secretary in the Ministry of the Environment in 1990 and was elected to the Storting in 1993. He was the minister of industry and energy from 1993 to 1996 and minister of finance from 1996 to 1997. He was prime minister from 2000 to 2001, leader of the Labour Party from 2002 to 2014, and was prime minister for a second time from 2005 to 2013. The following year, he was named the 13th secretary general of NATO, and his term was subsequently extended four times by the NATO heads of state and government. In February 2025 Stoltenberg was again appointed the minister of finance.

Stoltenberg has been described as a cautious politician, belonging to the right wing of social democracy. When he became prime minister in 2000, he was portrayed as the "Norwegian Tony Blair", and his policies were inspired by Blair's New Labour agenda. As the second longest serving high-ranking official in NATO history, Stoltenberg worked to expand the alliance into Eastern Europe and to strengthen the alliance's military capabilities in response to the Russo-Ukrainian War, and his tenure coincided with the largest increase in NATO defense spending since the Cold War.

== Early life ==
Stoltenberg was born 16 March 1959 in Oslo, into the Norwegian Stoltenberg family, the family name derived from Stoltenberg in Schleswig-Holstein where a German ancestor once lived. Jens's father, Thorvald Stoltenberg (1931–2018), was a Labour party politician and diplomat who was an ambassador, defence minister and foreign minister. His mother, Karin Stoltenberg (née Heiberg; 1931–2012), was a geneticist who was the state secretary in multiple governments during the 1980s. Marianne Heiberg, married to former foreign minister Johan Jørgen Holst, was his maternal aunt. Jens lived in SFR Yugoslavia from 1961 to 1964 while his father worked at the Norwegian embassy.

Stoltenberg attended primary school at Oslo Waldorf School, and upper secondary school at Oslo Cathedral School. He served his mandatory military service with the Army's Infantry Training Centre at Evjemoen in Aust-Agder. After leaving the army, Stoltenberg enrolled at the University of Oslo, graduating in 1987 with the cand.oecon. degree in economics. The title of his thesis was Makroøkonomisk planlegging under usikkerhet. En empirisk analyse ("Macroeconomic planning under uncertainty. An empirical analysis").

Stoltenberg was influenced by his sister Camilla, who at the time was a member of the then Marxist–Leninist group Red Youth. He opposed the Vietnam War, leading to his first steps into politics. Following heavy bombing raids against the North Vietnamese port city of Hai Phong at the end of the Vietnam War, he participated in protest rallies targeting the United States Embassy in Oslo. On at least one occasion embassy windows were broken by stone-throwing protesters. Several of Stoltenberg's friends were arrested by the police after these events.

== Journalistic career (1979–1990) ==
From 1979 to 1981, Stoltenberg was a journalist for Arbeiderbladet. From 1985 to 1989, he was the leader of the Workers' Youth League. From 1989 to 1990, he worked as an executive officer for Statistics Norway, Norway's central institution for producing official statistics. He also worked part-time as an hourly paid instructor at the University of Oslo during this period. Between 1990 and 1992, he was leader of the Oslo chapter of the Labour Party.

Up to 1990, he had regular contacts with a Soviet diplomat. He ended this relationship after being informed by the Norwegian Police Security Service that his contact was a KGB agent, warning him against further contact. The code name given to Stoltenberg by the KGB was "Steklov".

== First career in Norwegian politics (1990–2013) ==
=== Ministry for Environment and Minister for Trade and Energy (1990–1996) ===
Stoltenberg was State Secretary in the Ministry of the Environment from 1990 to 1991. He was first elected to Parliament in 1993 for the Oslo constituency, and was a member of the Labour Party. He was the Minister of Industry from 1993 to 1996, until Brundtland resigned.

=== Minister of Finance (1996–1997) ===
In 1996, Thorbjørn Jagland became prime minister, and Stoltenberg became Minister of Finance. On 29 September 1997, Jagland resigned because of an ultimatum he issued stating that the cabinet would resign if the party received less than 36.9% of the popular vote. The Labour Party only received 35.0%, so power was transferred to the first cabinet of Kjell Magne Bondevik. After Jagland's resignation and while in parliamentary opposition, Stoltenberg served on the standing committee on Oil and Energy Affairs in the Storting. He became the parliamentary leader and prime minister candidate for the Labour Party in February 2000.

=== First term as Prime Minister (2000–2001) ===
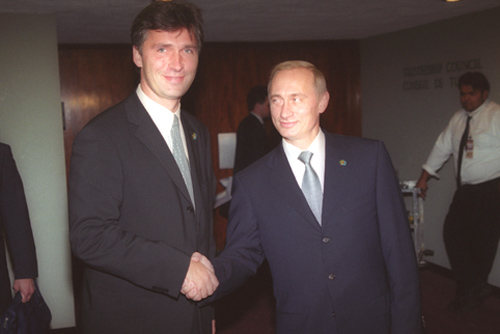
Stoltenberg with Russian president Vladimir Putin in New York City, 2000

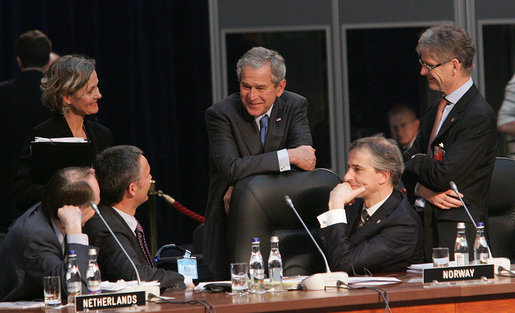
Stoltenberg and Jonas Gahr Støre with US president George W. Bush during the NATO Summit in April 2008

In 2000, the first cabinet of Bondevik resigned following an unsuccessful motion of confidence. Stoltenberg's first cabinet governed Norway from 17 March 2000 to 19 October 2001. Stoltenberg was the deputy leader of the Labour Party while Jagland was the party leader. Upon election, Jagland was given the post as Foreign Minister and Stoltenberg was prime minister. Stoltenberg's first tenure as prime minister was controversial within his own party, being responsible for reforms and modernisation of the welfare state that included partly privatising several key state-owned services and corporations.

The 2001 election caused instability for the Labour Party. With the 98% votes taken, the Labour Party only garnered 24%, falling from 35%. The Norwegian newspaper Dagbladet stated: "We are heading for a political earthquake when the votes are counted tonight, if we believe the opinion polls." In an interview with The Associated Press Jagland stated "It is unstable and unpredictable." After the election in 2001, Stoltenberg and his cabinet were forced to resign, with the Labour Party suffering from its worst election campaign results since 1924. Jagland, the Labour Party leader, commented on the results saying, "We will have to make a decision about whether to continue in government after we know the full results". After the election Stoltenberg said, "What is clear is that this was a very bad election."

Some analysts have pointed out that one of the causes for their loss was that with only one year in power until the next election, more time was spent initiating or trying to start reforms than telling the people why they had to be done. Such reforms included selling down in state-owned companies, re-organisation of health care and public hospitals and changes in sick pay. The changes made from the 2001 election to the 2005 election were described by Norwegian newspaper VG as an "extreme makeover".

==== Party leader election ====
The election result in 2001 was quickly followed by a leadership battle between Jagland and Stoltenberg. Both Jagland as leader and Stoltenberg as deputy leader said they were open to be challenged for their positions at the party's congress in November 2002. Stoltenberg refused to say whether he would challenge Jagland for the leadership position, which was seen by political commentators as a sign that he probably would seek the leadership position. In the beginning of February 2002 Jagland, who had been briefly hospitalized in January and had a subsequent sick leave, said that he would not seek reelection as leader. In November 2002, Stoltenberg was unanimously elected new leader at the Labour Party's congress.

=== Second term as Prime Minister (2005–2013) ===
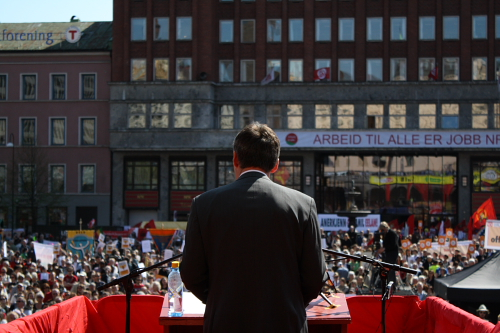
Stoltenberg speaks on International Workers' Day at Youngstorget in Oslo on 1 May 2009.

Stoltenberg's second cabinet governed Norway from 17 October 2005 to 16 October 2013. The 2005 parliamentary election saw a vast improvement for the Labour Party, gaining a majority in parliament together with the other "Red-Green" parties, the Socialist Left Party and the Centre Party. This paved the way for a historic first in Norway, with the Labour Party forming the Red-Green Coalition after a coalition deal with Stoltenberg was struck. Since the government's formation, key political issues such as Norwegian military participation in the war in Afghanistan, petroleum activities in the Barents Sea, LGBT rights, immigration and the quality of standard education were greatly debated by the public. Following Stoltenberg's re-election in 2009, he worked on the Norwegian response to the ongoing global recession and supported environmentalist policies through private and corporate taxation.

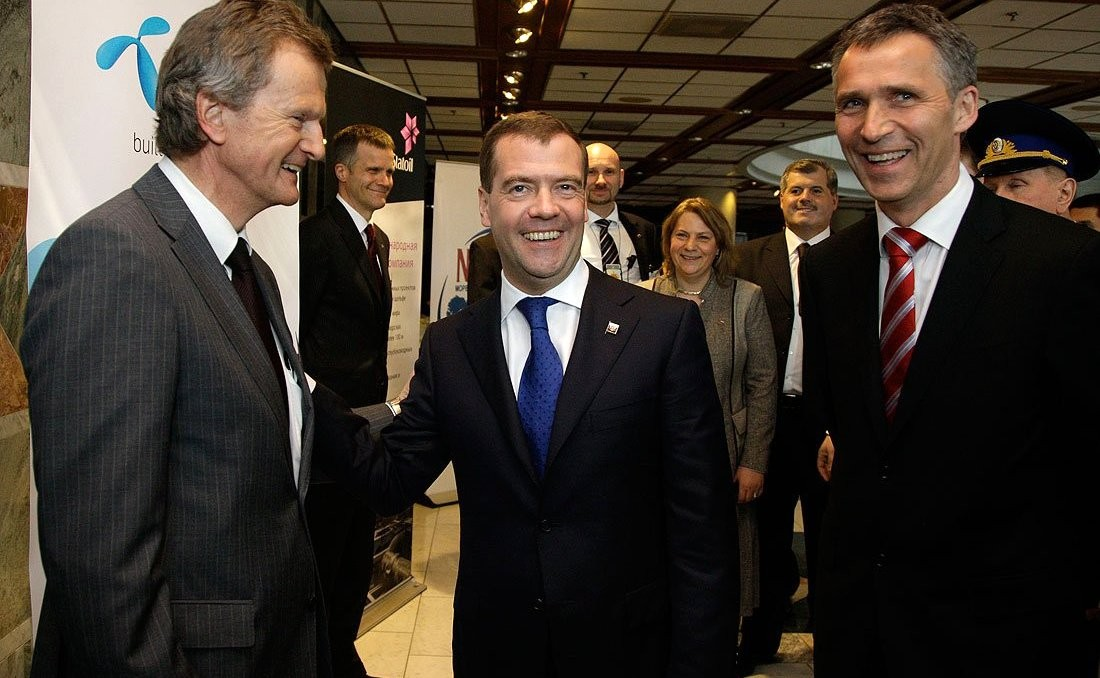
Stoltenberg with Russian president Dimitry Medvedev, 27 April 2010

A marine border dispute with Russia in the Barents Sea since 1978 was settled when Stoltenberg and former President of Russia Dimitry Medvedev signed an agreement on 27 April 2010 in Oslo. The agreement was a compromise, which divides a disputed area of around 175,000 km^{2} (68,000 sq mi) into two approximately equally sized parts. The agreement still needs ratification by the State Duma and the Parliament of Norway in order to be implemented. Norway had previously insisted on a border in accordance with the equidistance principle, which is recognized by the United Nations Convention on Law of the Sea Article 15 and the Convention on the Territorial Sea and the Contiguous Zone Article 6. Russia invoked a Stalin-era decree of the Soviet Union from 1926, which was not recognised by any other country. The new agreement replaced a controversial temporary agreement negotiated by Jens Evensen and Arne Treholt, who was later revealed to be a Soviet spy and who aided the Soviet Union in the negotiations. Most of the disputed area was within what would normally be considered Norwegian according to the relevant international treaties.

As Prime Minister, Stoltenberg worked for a constructive relationship with Russia through dialogue and cooperation underpinned by NATO's deterrence and defence capabilities. He also emphasised the need to focus on security challenges close to Allied territory.

==== 22 July 2011 terrorist attacks ====
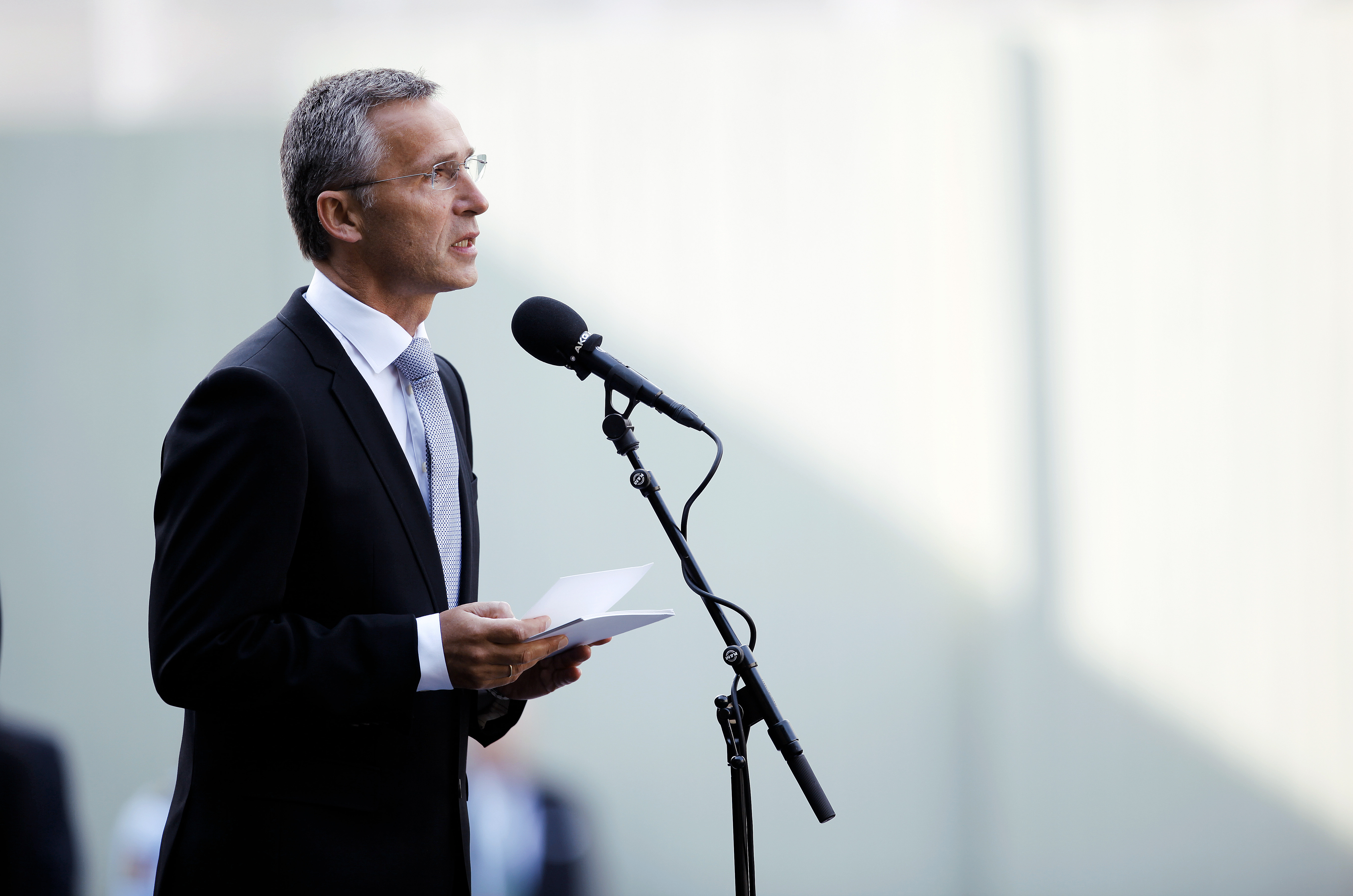
Stoltenberg speaks at a service commemorating the one year anniversary of the 2011 attacks.

On 22 July 2011, a far-right extremist committed two attacks: a bomb went off in Oslo outside the government building which houses the prime minister's office, killing eight people. About an hour later, the extremist shot and killed 69 people at Utøya, an island forty-five minutes away where the ruling Labour Party was holding its annual youth camp. The PM was due for a visit at the youth camp the next day, and was in his residence preparing his speech at the time of the Oslo explosion.

On Sunday 24 July, Stoltenberg spoke at the church service in the Oslo Cathedral. He named two of the victims at Utøya, Monica Bøsei, who was the camp's leader, and Tore Eikeland, who was the leader of the youth chapter in Hordaland. He also said that "No one has said it better than the AUF girl who was interviewed by CNN: If one man can show so much hate, think how much love we could show, standing together." The AUF girl mentioned is Stine Renate Håheim interviewed by CNN's Richard Quest on 23 July 2011. Håheim again quoted her friend Helle Gannestad, who had tweeted this from home, watching events unfold on TV.

On 24 August 2012, 33-year-old Norwegian Anders Behring Breivik was found guilty by the Oslo District Court of having perpetrated by himself both terrorist attacks, the bombing of the prime minister's office and the shooting spree on Utøya island, and was convicted to containment, a special form of prison sentence that can be extended indefinitely—with a time frame of 21 years and a minimum time of 10 years, the maximum penalty in Norway.

On 3 September 2012, Norwegian daily Klassekampen wrote that the Gjørv Report on the terrorist attack "is the hardest verdict against a Norwegian cabinet since the Fact-Finding Commission of 1945 ensured that Johan Nygaardsvold's political career was abruptly halted." Stoltenberg said after the report was published that he had "ultimate responsibility for the preparedness in our country, a responsibility I take seriously," but said he would not resign.

==== 2013 election and defeat ====
Stoltenberg was the prime minister candidate for the Red-Green Coalition in the 2013 elections, seeking re-election for a third term.

On 9 September 2013, the coalition failed to win a majority, with 72 of the required 85 mandates, despite the Labour Party remaining the largest party in Norway with 31%. After winning candidate Erna Solberg formed her cabinet, Stoltenberg returned to the Parliament as leader of the opposition, and a member of the Standing Committee on Foreign Affairs and Defence. In December 2013, he was appointed by the United Nations as a Special Envoy on Climate Change, alongside the former Ghanaian president John Kufuor.

=== Policies as Prime Minister ===
Stoltenberg has been described as a cautious politician, belonging to the right wing of social democracy.

When he became prime minister in 2000, he was portrayed as the "Norwegian Tony Blair", and his policies were inspired by Blair's New Labour agenda. Stoltenberg also said he wanted to learn from Blair's policies. After election defeat in 2001, he reoriented towards a more traditional line of close cooperation with trade unions.

In security policy, Stoltenberg favours increased military spending and dialogue.

==== Defense and foreign politics ====
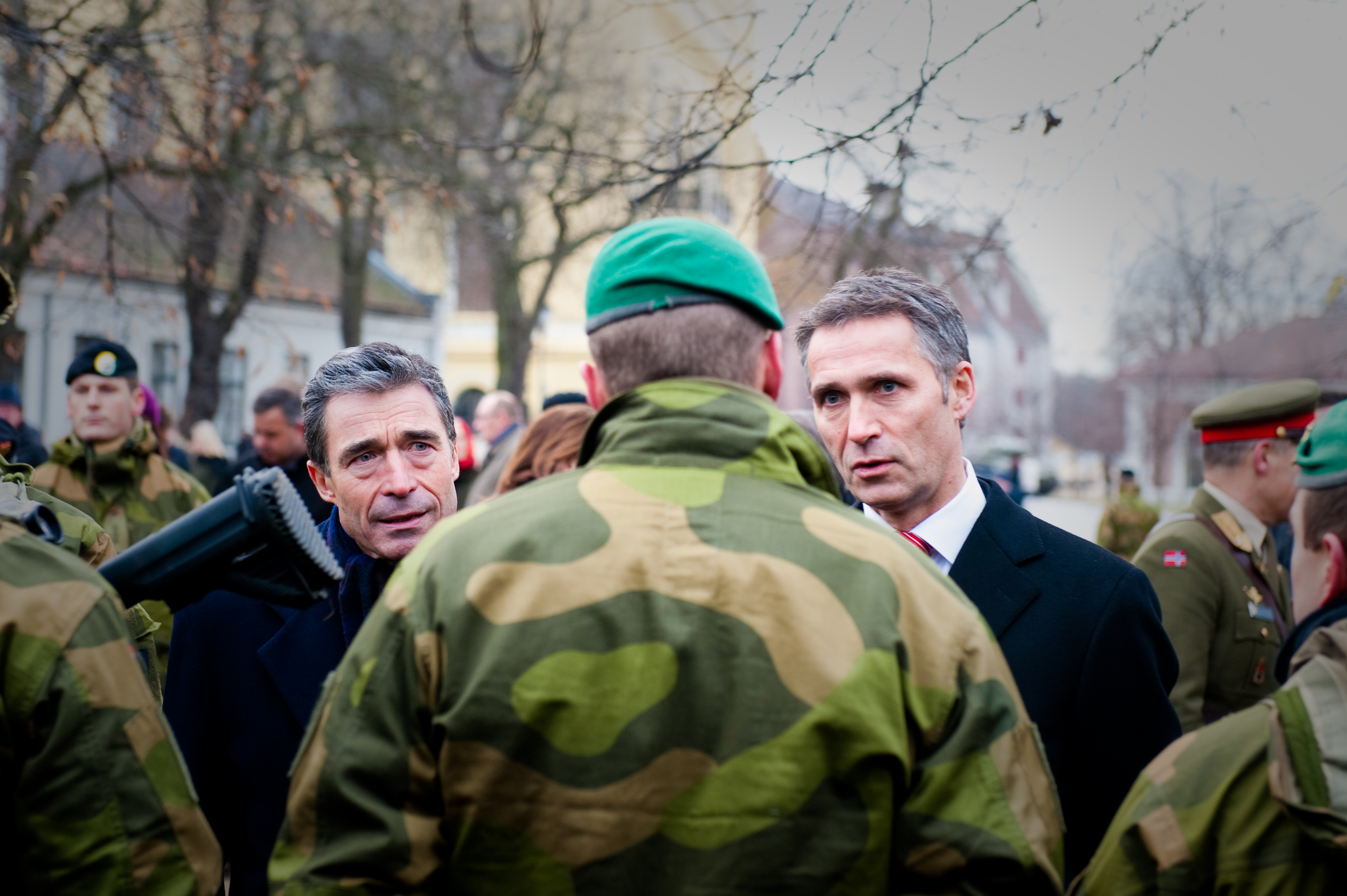
Secretary General of NATO Anders Fogh Rasmussen and Stoltenberg, while visiting Oslo talk with members of Telemark Battalion

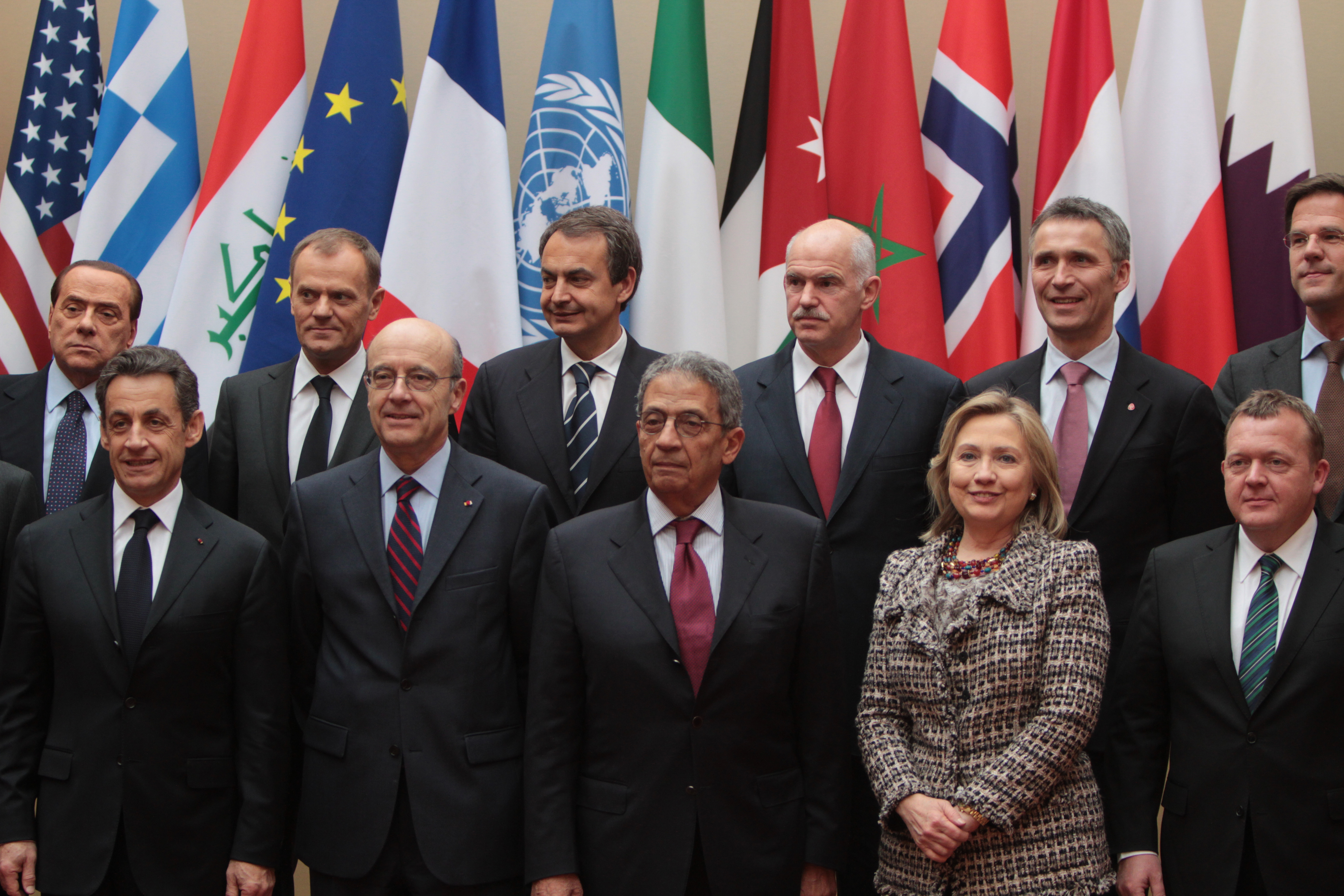
Stoltenberg at the Paris Summit of 19 March 2011 (back row, second from right), which marked the start of a military intervention in Libya

While Stoltenberg was prime minister, Norway's defence spending increased steadily. Stoltenberg has also been instrumental in modernising the Norwegian armed forces, and in contributing forces to various NATO operations.

Stoltenberg is a supporter of enhanced trans-Atlantic cooperation ties. He has also been a supporter of Norwegian membership in the European Union.

Stoltenberg has criticized Israel over alleged violations of international law in the Palestinian Territories as well as in international waters, such as the 2010 Gaza flotilla raid. Stoltenberg also praised doctors Mads Gilbert and Erik Fosse for their humanitarian work in the Gaza Strip during the Gaza War.

==== Financial crisis ====
Stoltenberg promoted international financial cooperation during the financial crisis. This was done through the use of the International Monetary Fund (IMF) and a meeting in Chile 27–29 March 2009 where social democratic leaders from around the world met at a Progressive Governance Conference, just prior to the first G20 summit on the financial crisis. The panel included representation from multiple other countries including the United States, Britain, and Brazil. An emergency meeting of the European Social Democratic Forum (PES) gathered in Oslo in May 2011, on an initiative from Stoltenberg and the think tank Policy Network.

Both nationally and internationally, Stoltenberg emphasised the enormous costs the financial crisis had in the form of a high unemployment rate, and appealed for better international coordination, the balance between austerity and economic growth stimulus, active labor market measures for young people, and investments for increased innovation. Norway came out of the financial crisis with the lowest unemployment rate in Europe.

==== Environment and climate change ====
Stoltenberg partnered with tropical countries to preserve more of their rainforest to bind carbon dioxide (CO_{2}) in order to reduce greenhouse gas emissions. In 2007, the government received support from the opposition to a long-term agreement to finance forest conservation with 3 billion NOK annually.

Stoltenberg advocated that international agreements with global taxes or quotas were the most effective means of reducing greenhouse gas emissions. At the UN Climate Change Conference 2009, a separate proposal on the preservation of rainforests with funding from wealthy countries, advanced by Stoltenberg and Brazilian Pres. Luiz Inácio Lula da Silva in 2009 obtained support from world leaders including U.S. President Barack Obama during COP15 in Copenhagen.

The summit in Copenhagen ended without a binding agreement, but before the subsequent COP16 in Cancún, Stoltenberg succeeded then-British Prime Minister Gordon Brown in the leadership of the committee dealing with the financing of climate actions in developing countries, also consisting of Ethiopian Prime Minister Meles Zenawi. Under a separate forest and climate conference in Oslo in May 2010, a proposal was presented to a number of countries, with final delivery of the report in autumn 2010.

In January 2014 Jens Stoltenberg became United Nations Special Envoy on Climate Change. During the meeting there he met with Secretary-General Ban Ki-moon as well as UN Framework Convention director Christiana Figueres and both Achim Steiner and Helen Clark of the United Nations Development Programme.

==== Vaccines ====
Stoltenberg has been an advocate for child vaccination. The first speech he gave in his second term as prime minister was during Norway's "Pharmaceutics days" in 2005 under the title "Vaccination against poverty". Stoltenberg was a board director of the Global Alliance for Vaccines and Immunization (GAVI) from 2002 to 2005 and was awarded the Children's Health Award in 2005.

An international initiative, with the UK, the Gates Foundation and Norway in the lead, GAVI received more than $3.7 billion until 2015 for their work against child mortality. Stoltenberg was a driving force behind the initiative, and has stressed that this was an important contribution to save children from dying of common childhood illnesses.

In his New Year speech on 1 January 2013, Stoltenberg spoke about vaccination of the world's children as a personal matter of the heart, saying "Small jabs are giving millions of children the gift of life. Simple medicines can save their mothers. The fact that all these mothers' and children's lives can be saved is—as I see it—a miracle of our time."

== United Nations Special Envoy (2013–2014) ==
In 2011, Stoltenberg received the United Nations Foundation's Champion of Global Change Award, chosen for his extraordinary effort toward meeting the Millennium Development Goals and bringing fresh ideas to global problems. In 2019, his term as Secretary General of NATO was extended for another two years. Earlier the same year, Stoltenberg had allocated 150 million Norwegian kroner of the foreign aid budget to the same foundation, which led to criticism.

In 2013, Stoltenberg served as a UN special envoy on climate change (global warming), and he chaired the UN High-Level Panel on System Wide Coherence and the High-Level Advisory Group on Climate Change Financing.

== NATO Secretary General (2014–2024) ==
=== 2014 ===
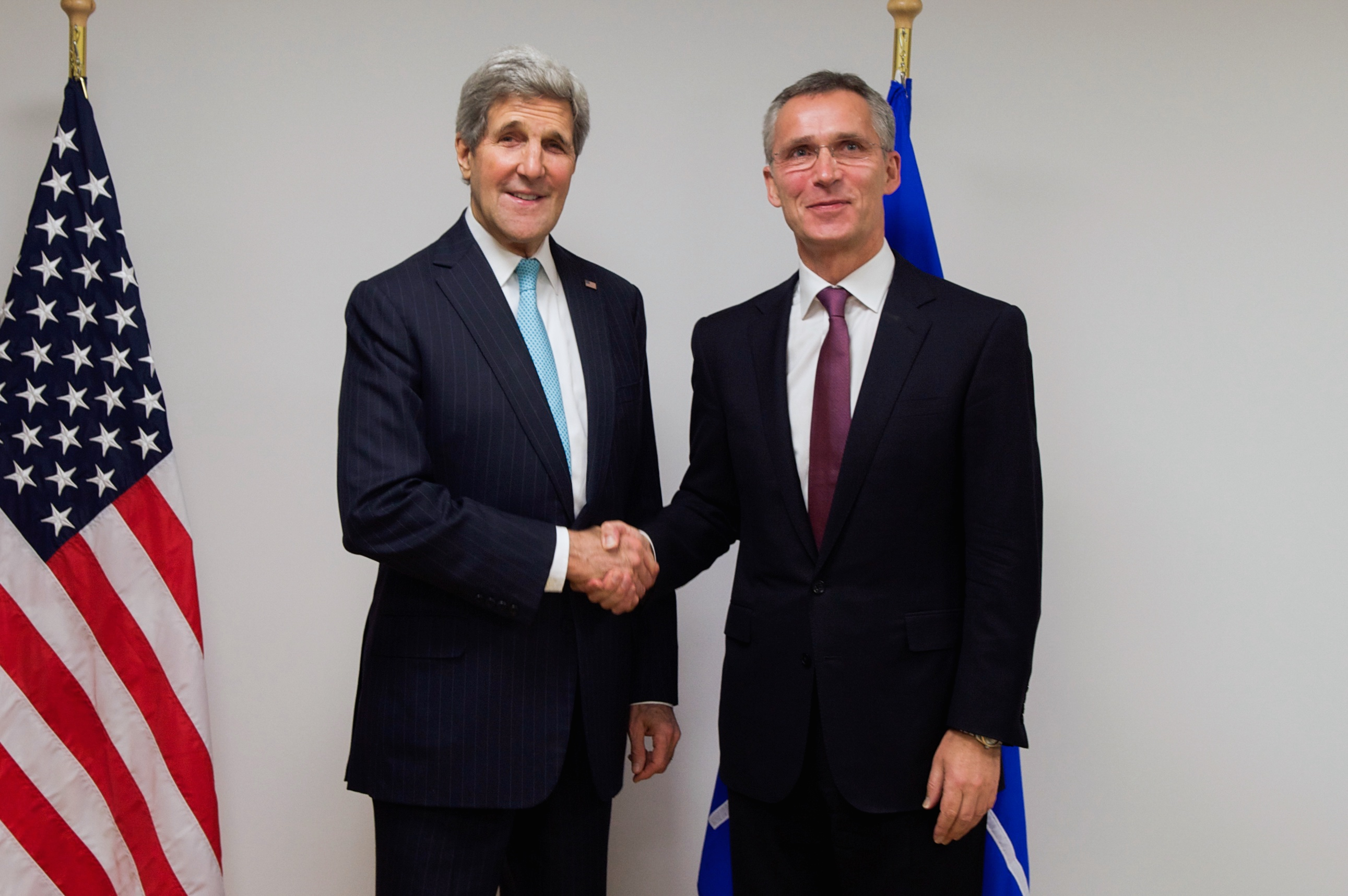
Stoltenberg with US Secretary of State John Kerry in Brussels, December 2014

On 28 March 2014, NATO's North Atlantic Council appointed Stoltenberg as designated successor of Anders Fogh Rasmussen as the 13th Secretary General of NATO and Chairman of the council, effective from 1 October 2014. The appointment had been widely expected in the media for some time, and commentators suggested out that the alliance's policies toward Russia would be the most important issue faced by Stoltenberg. Angela Merkel, the chancellor of Germany, appointed Stoltenberg as secretary-general, securing the support first of the United States, then the United Kingdom, and then of all other member states. Norway was a founding member of NATO in 1949, and Stoltenberg was the first Norwegian to serve as secretary-general.

=== 2015 ===
In June 2015, Stoltenberg said, "I believe we don't see any immediate threat against any NATO country from the east. Our goal is still cooperation with Russia… That serves NATO and it serves Russia."

In September 2015, Czech Deputy Prime Minister Andrej Babiš criticized NATO's lack of response to the European migrant crisis. After talks with Stoltenberg on migrant crisis issue Babiš said: "NATO is not interested in refugees, though Turkey, a NATO member, is their entrance gate to Europe and smugglers operate on Turkish territory".

=== 2016 ===
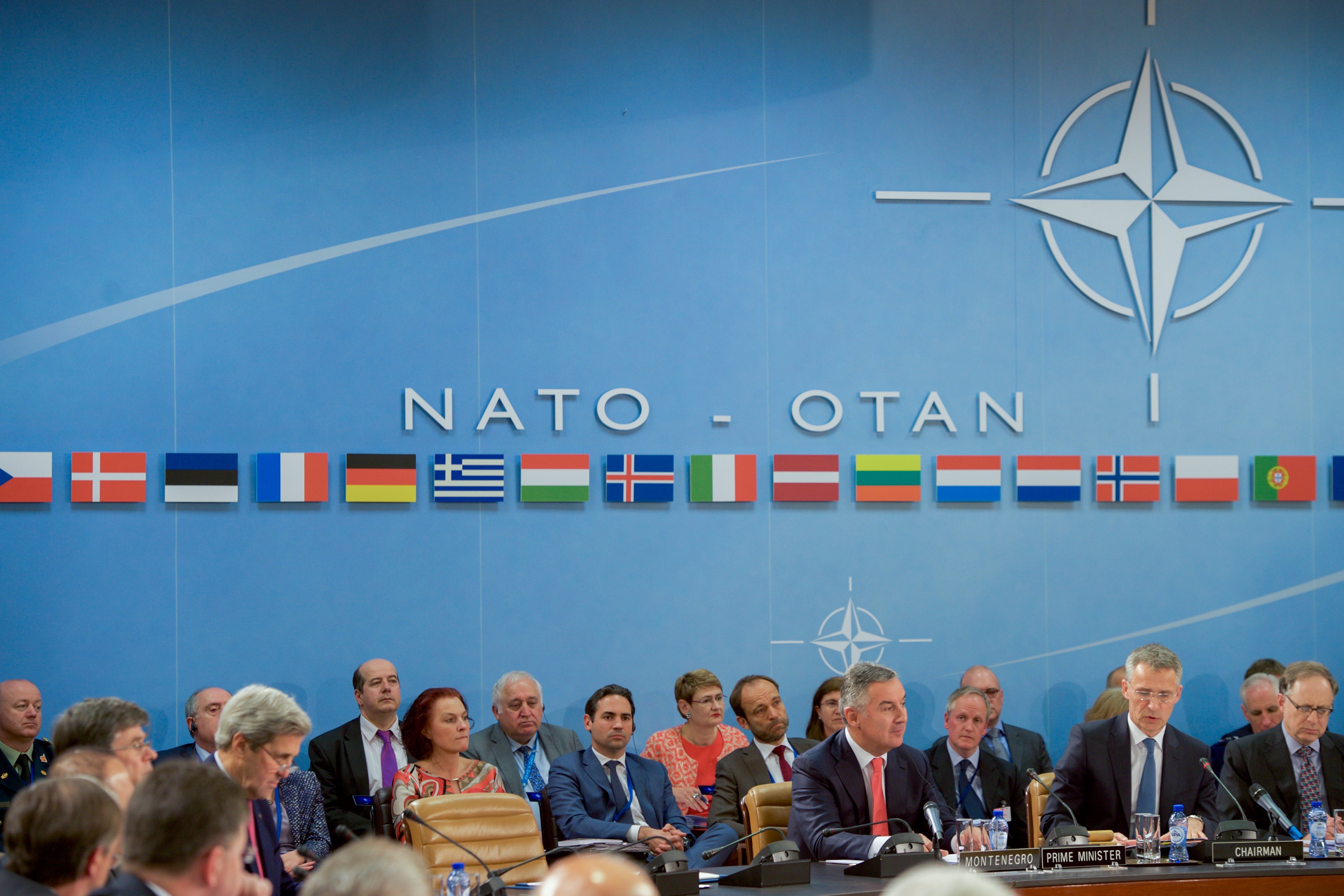
Stoltenberg and Montenegro's Prime Minister Milo Djukanovic attend a NATO foreign ministers meeting on 19 May 2016.

Stoltenberg strongly condemned the 2016 Turkish coup d'état attempt and expressed full support for Recep Tayyip Erdoğan's government. He did not condemn the 2016–present purges in Turkey. In November 2016, Stoltenberg admitted that some "Turkish officers working in NATO command structures... have requested asylum in the countries where they are working."

In June 2016, Stoltenberg said it was essential to step up cooperation with Israel, since Israel had been an active alliance partner for 20 years. In June 2018, Stoltenberg told Der Spiegel that NATO would not help Israel in the case of an attack by the Islamic Republic of Iran.

In 2016, Stoltenberg stated that the NATO strongly supported "the UN-led political process to find a solution" to the dispute over the northern part of Cyprus, which has been under illegal occupation since the Turkish invasion of 1974.

The presidency of Donald Trump was a major challenge to NATO during Stoltenberg's time as secretary general. Trump threatened to withdraw from NATO and undermine the alliance. A 2021 study argued that Stoltenberg played a key role in preventing Trump from undermining NATO. Stoltenberg helped to change Trump's stance on burden-sharing, as well as maintain a robust deterrence policy toward Russia.

=== 2017 ===
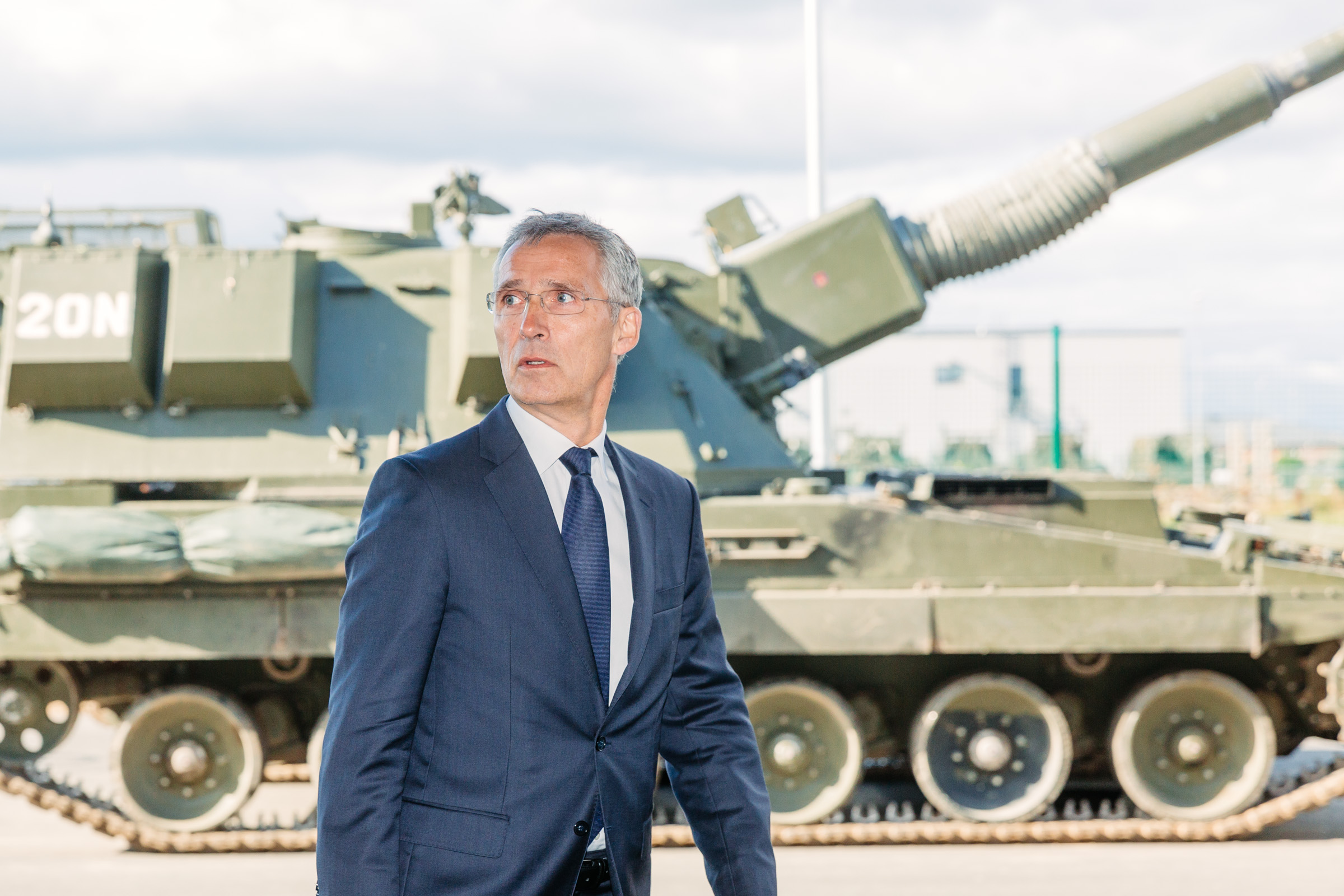
Stoltenberg visits NATO units in Tapa, Estonia in 2017.

In August 2017 the last NATO Certification Exercise of the four multinational battlegroups in the Baltic partners was conducted. Canada leads the battlegroup in Latvia. Germany leads the battlegroup in Lithuania. The United Kingdom leads the battlegroup in Estonia. The United States leads the battlegroup in Poland. This "NATO Enhanced Forward Presence" was the result of the 2016 Warsaw summit and much prior planning by Stoltenberg.

In September 2017, Stoltenberg warned that Russia has used big military exercises, including Zapad 2017 exercise in Russia's Kaliningrad Oblast and Belarus, "as a disguise or a precursor for aggressive military actions against their neighbours."

=== 2018 ===
In January 2018, in response to the Turkish invasion of northern Syria aimed at ousting U.S.-backed Syrian Kurds from the enclave of Afrin, Stoltenberg said that Turkey is "the NATO Ally which has suffered most from terrorist attacks over many years and Turkey, as all of the countries, have the right to self defence, but it is important that this is done in a proportionate and measured way."

In February 2018, Stoltenberg stated: "We don't see any threat [from Russia] against any NATO ally and therefore, I'm always careful speculating too much about hypothetical situations." Stoltenberg welcomed the 2018 Russia–United States Summit between Vladimir Putin and Donald Trump in Helsinki, Finland. He said NATO is not trying to isolate Russia.

At the July 2018 Brussels Summit, the Alliance reconfirmed its commitment to preserving the credibility, coherence and resilience of the deterrence and defense posture, including by increasing its responsiveness, heightening readiness and improving reinforcement.

=== 2019 ===
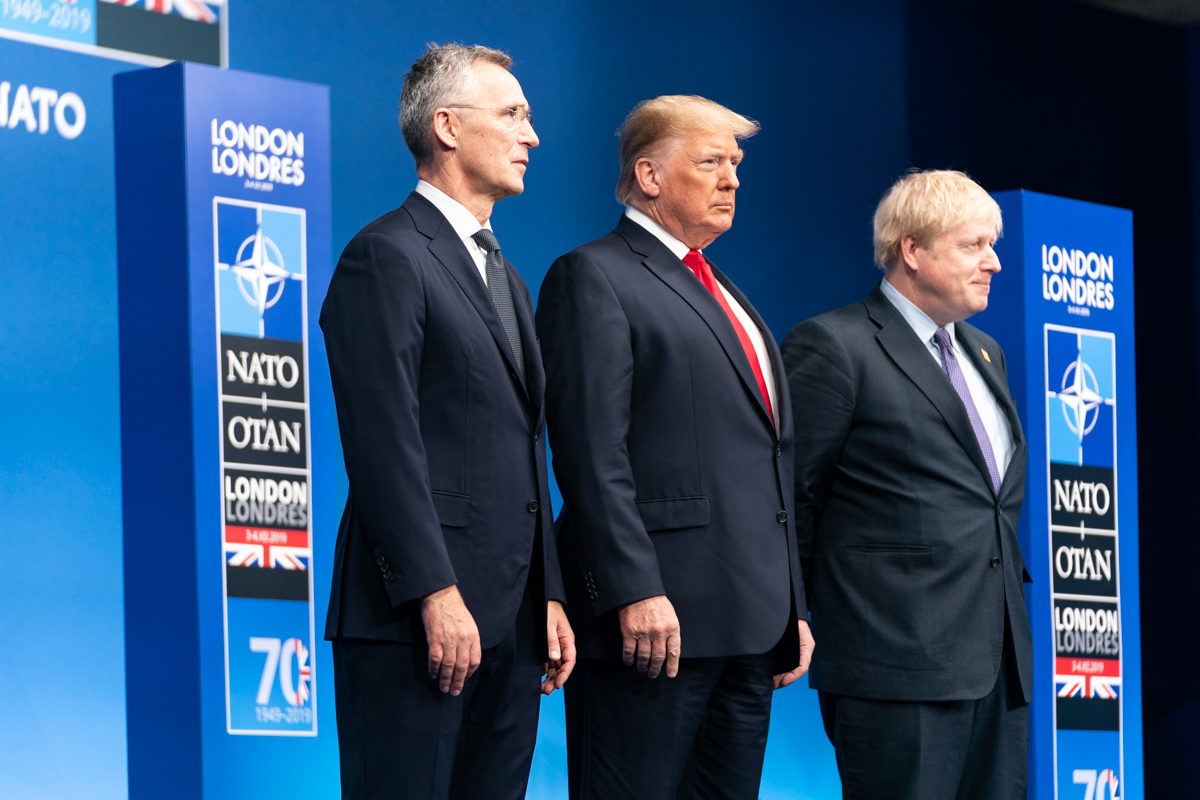
Stoltenberg at a NATO Plenary Session with US President Donald Trump and UK Prime Minister Boris Johnson in December 2019

In March 2019, Stoltenberg stated that "Georgia will become a member of NATO".

In April 2019, Stoltenberg warned in a joint session of the U.S. Congress of the threat posed by Russia. In May 2019, Stoltenberg hailed Turkey's contribution to NATO. He said: "Turkey joined the Alliance in 1952, and it continues to be a highly valued member of our family of nations. As secretary-general, I greatly appreciate all that Turkey does for our Alliance."

In August 2019, Stoltenberg warned that NATO needs to "address the rise of China", by closely cooperating with Australia, New Zealand, Japan and South Korea. In June 2020, Stoltenberg urged like-minded nations to stand up to China's "bullying and coercion".

Stoltenberg "strongly condemned" the 2019 Abqaiq–Khurais attack on key Saudi Arabia's oil facilities and accused Iran of "supporting different terrorist groups and being responsible for destabilising the whole region."

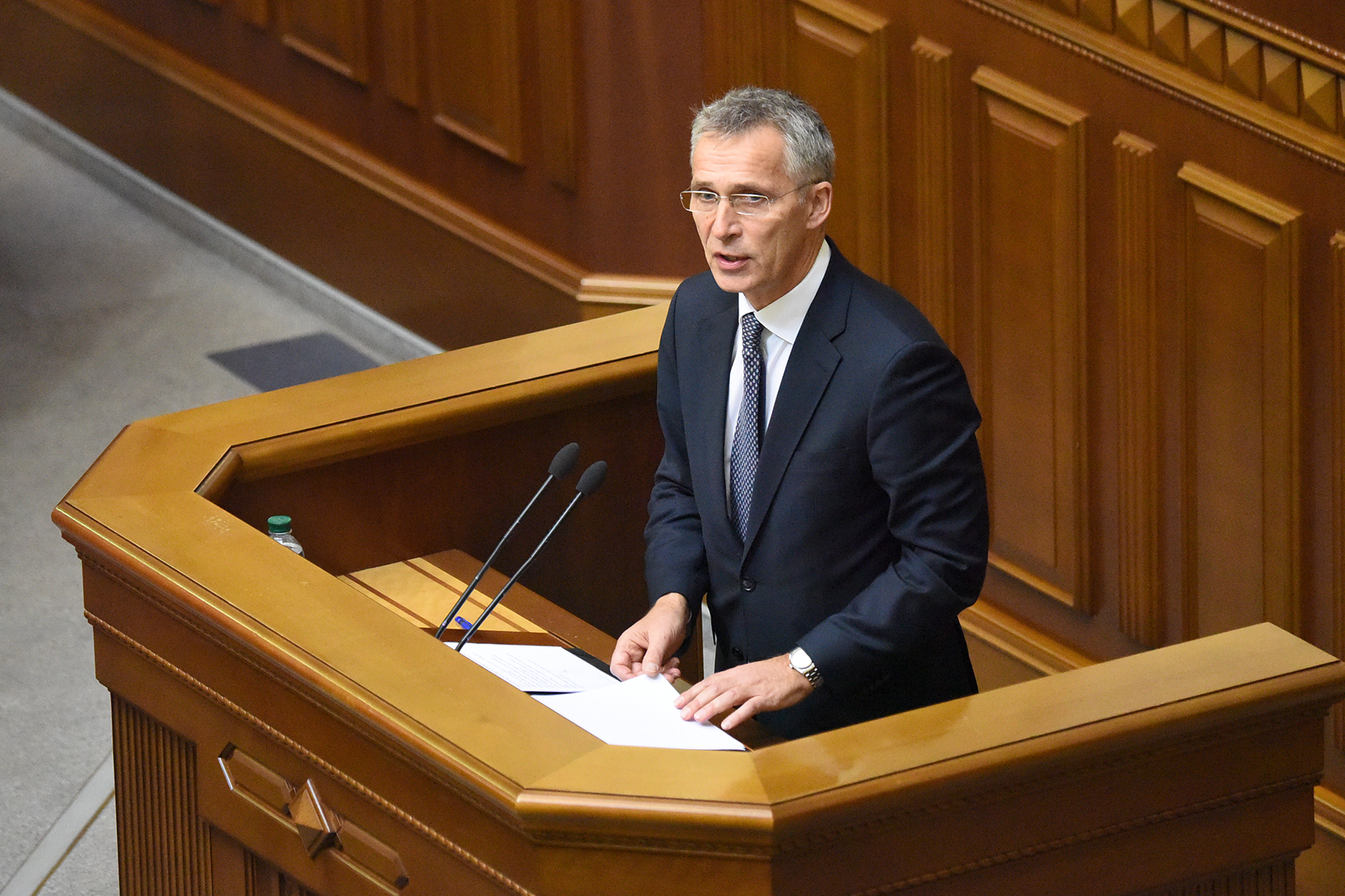
Stoltenberg speaks on Verkhovna Rada. Ukraine. 2019 Foto: Vadim Chuprina

In October 2019, Turkey invaded the Kurdish areas in Syria. Stoltenberg said that Turkey has "legitimate security concerns" during press conference with Turkish FM Mevlüt Çavuşoğlu.

In December 2019, Stoltenberg told journalists in Brussels that "Since 2016, Canada and European allies have added $130 billion more to the defense budgets, and this number will increase to 400 billion U.S. dollars by 2024. This is unprecedented. This is making NATO stronger."

=== 2020 ===
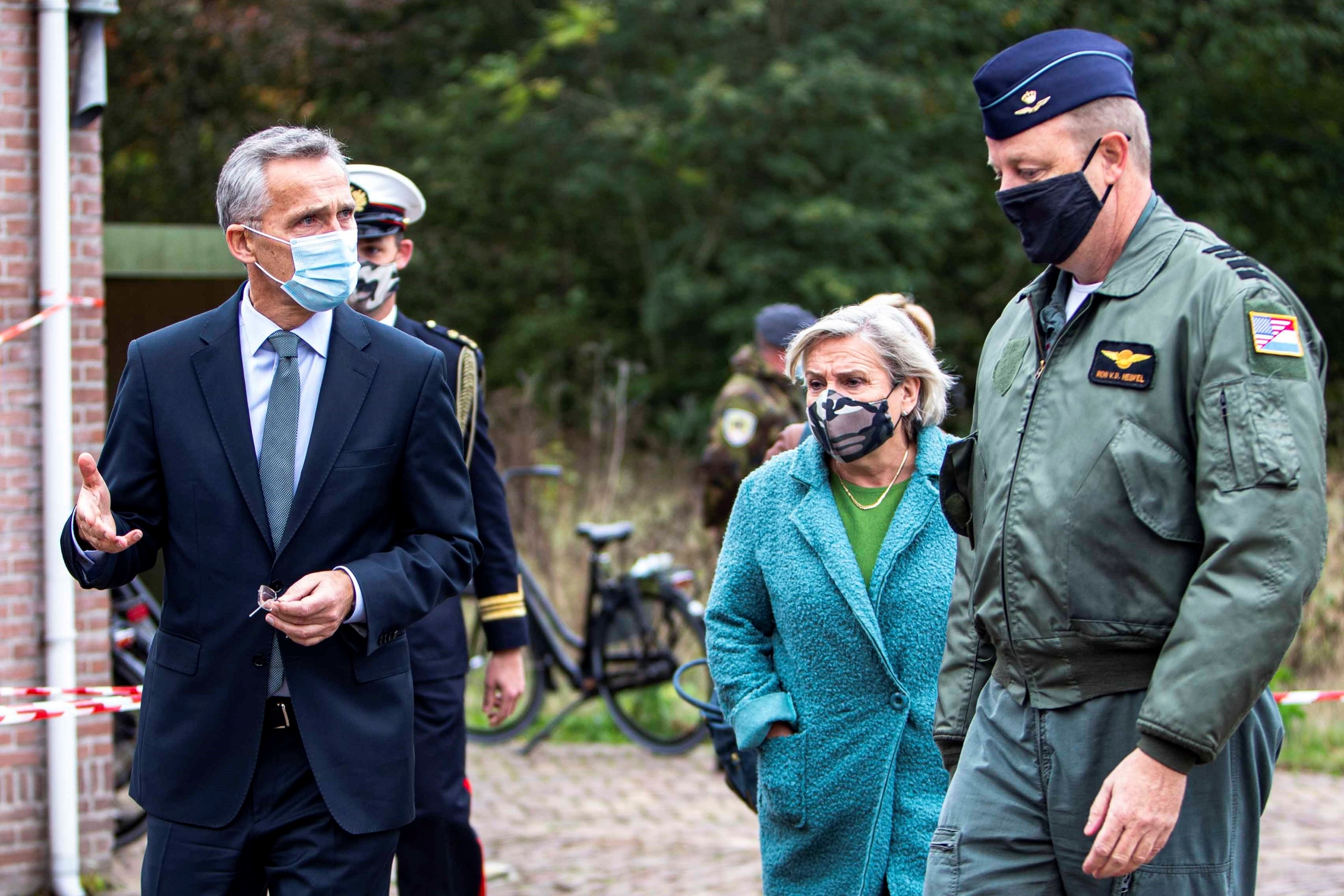
Stoltenberg visits a Dutch airbase hosting NATO deterrence exercise in October 2020.

The U.S. military's 2020 Baghdad International Airport airstrike, which killed the high-level Iranian General Qasem Soleimani, brought strong reactions from around the world. Stoltenberg said, following a meeting on 6 January, "all members of the Atlantic alliance stood behind the United States in the Middle East" and that "Iran must refrain from further violence and provocations."

On 14 February Stoltenberg opened the Munich Security Conference. Amongst the topics he chose to address were Donald Trump's call for the European allies to contribute more funds to the common military good, the situation in Afghanistan which he promised not to leave, and the desire of Russia to reimagine the world in terms of the spheres of influence of the post-war years of the 20th century. In a thinly veiled reference to Chinese leadership in the 5G telecoms sector, he said that "Keeping our societies open, free and resilient must be part of our response... We should not be tempted to trade short term economic benefits for longer-term challenges to our security." Earlier in the day, Stoltenberg had dealt with the partnership issue, and listed New Zealand, Australia, Finland, Sweden, Ukraine and Georgia as such, saying "We support them, but they also support us. Many partners contribute to NATO missions and operations, for instance in Afghanistan or Iraq."

There is a long-standing dispute between Turkey and Greece in the Aegean Sea. The disagreement flared in August. The same month Stoltenberg said that "Both Greece and Turkey are two valued allies and both contribute to our shared security. There are some disagreements and I welcome that there are bilateral contacts trying to address these differences," adding that NATO is not a part of these bilateral talks.

In October 2020, Stoltenberg called for an immediate end to the fighting over the breakaway Nagorno-Karabakh region, an enclave that belongs to Azerbaijan under international law but is populated and governed by ethnic Armenians.

=== 2021 ===
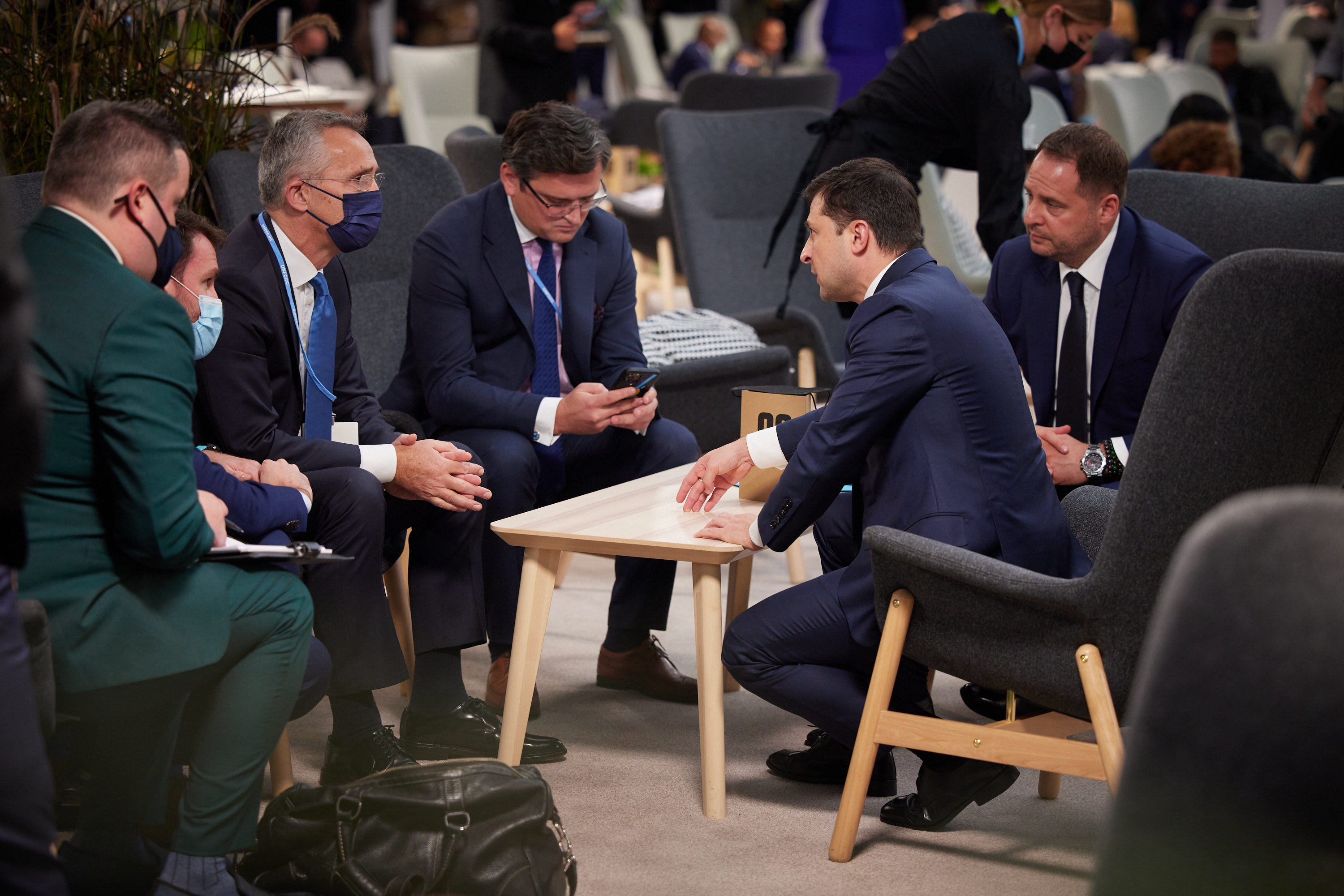
Stoltenberg and Ukrainian President Volodymyr Zelenskyy at the 2021 UN Climate Change Conference in Glasgow

On 19 February 2021 Stoltenberg addressed the Munich Security Conference via teleconference due to the COVID-19 pandemic with largely anodyne remarks.

On 13 April Stoltenberg called on Russia to halt its buildup of forces near the border with Ukraine. Russian Defense Minister Sergey Shoygu said that Russia has deployed troops to its western borders for "combat training exercises" in response to NATO "military activities that threaten Russia". Defender-Europe 21, one of the largest NATO-led military exercises in Europe in decades, began in mid-March 2021 and lasted until June 2021. It included "nearly simultaneous operations across more than 30 training areas" in Estonia, Bulgaria, Romania and other countries.

On 14 April 2021, Stoltenberg said the alliance has agreed to start withdrawing its troops from Afghanistan by 1 May. Soon after the withdrawal of NATO troops started, the Taliban launched an offensive against the Afghan government, quickly advancing in front of a collapsing Afghan Armed Forces. According to a U.S. intelligence report, the Afghan government would likely collapse within six months after NATO completes its withdrawal from the country. On 7 June 2021, Stoltenberg said that "we have been able to build, train Afghan security forces so they are now responsible for security in their own country." By 15 August 2021, Taliban militants controlled the vast majority of Afghanistan and had encircled the capital city of Kabul. Stoltenberg said that "it was a surprise, the speed of the collapse and how quickly that happened."

Stoltenberg attended the 2021 United Nations Climate Change Conference, and specified that the fight against climate change also is something the military could participate in. He also expressed that militaries should work with operating both fossil and environmentally friendly ones.

On 30 November Russian President Vladimir Putin stated that an expansion of NATO's presence in Ukraine, especially the deployment of any long-range missiles capable of striking Moscow or missile defence systems similar to those in Romania and Poland, would be a "red line" issue for the Kremlin. Putin argued that these missile-defense systems may be converted into launchers of offensive Tomahawk long-range cruise missiles. He said that "In a dialogue with the United States and its allies, we will insist on working out specific agreements that would exclude any further NATO moves eastward and the deployment of weapons systems that threaten us in close vicinity to Russian territory." Stoltenberg replied that "It's only Ukraine and 30 NATO allies that decide when Ukraine is ready to join NATO. Russia has no veto, Russia has no say, and Russia has no right to establish a sphere of influence to try to control their neighbors."

=== 2022 ===
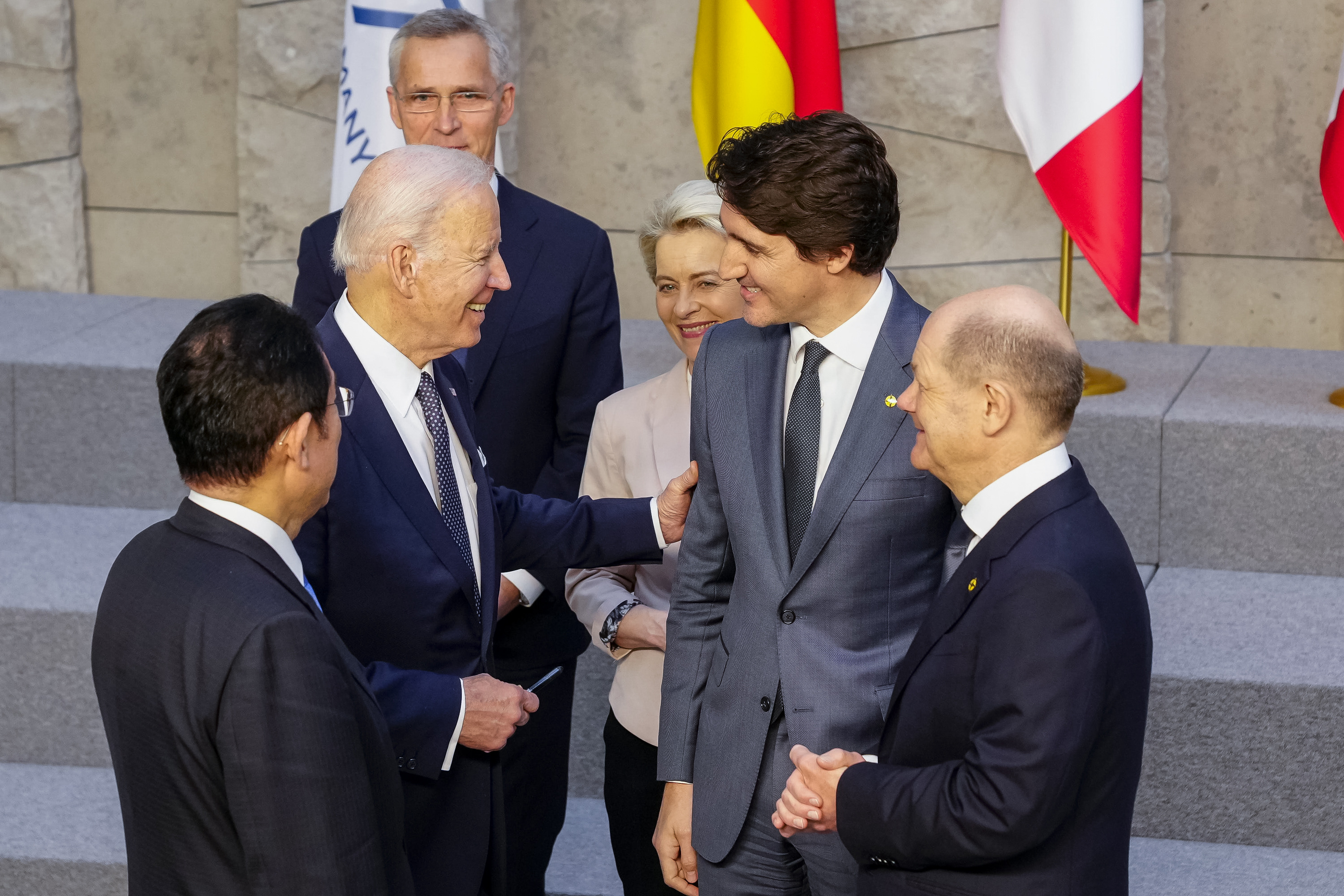
Western leaders met in Brussels for a round of emergency summits of NATO, the European Council and the G7 to discuss the Russo-Ukrainian War, 23 March 2022.

On 14 January Stoltenberg condemned the 2022 Ukraine cyberattack. He stated that NATOs day experts in Brussels has exchanged information with Ukraine, and that experts from the alliance would be assisting Ukrainian authorities with the matter. He added: "In the coming days, NATO and Ukraine will sign an agreement on enhanced cooperation on data security, including Ukraine's access to NATO's malware sharing platform".

On 19 February at the Munich Security Conference Stoltenberg remarked that despite NATO's "strong diplomatic efforts to find a political solution [to the Russo-Ukrainian war]... we have seen no sign of withdrawal or de-escalation so far. On the contrary, Russia's build-up continues." He said "we have made written proposals to the Putin administration to reduce risks and increase transparency of military activities, address space and cyber threats, and engage on arms control, including on nuclear weapons and missiles... [Putin] is attempting to roll back history. And recreate [the] spheres of influence. [He] wants to limit NATO's right to collective defence... and demands that we should remove all our forces and infrastructure from the countries that joined NATO after the fall of the Berlin Wall... wants to deny sovereign countries the right to choose their own path. And their own security arrangements. For Ukraine – but also for other countries, such as Finland and Sweden. And for the first time, we now see Beijing joining Moscow in calling on NATO to stop admitting new members. It is an attempt to control the fate of free nations. To rewrite the international rulebook. And impose their own authoritarian models of governance." On the dais with him was Ursula von der Leyen. Together they proceeded to give an interview to the witness audience.

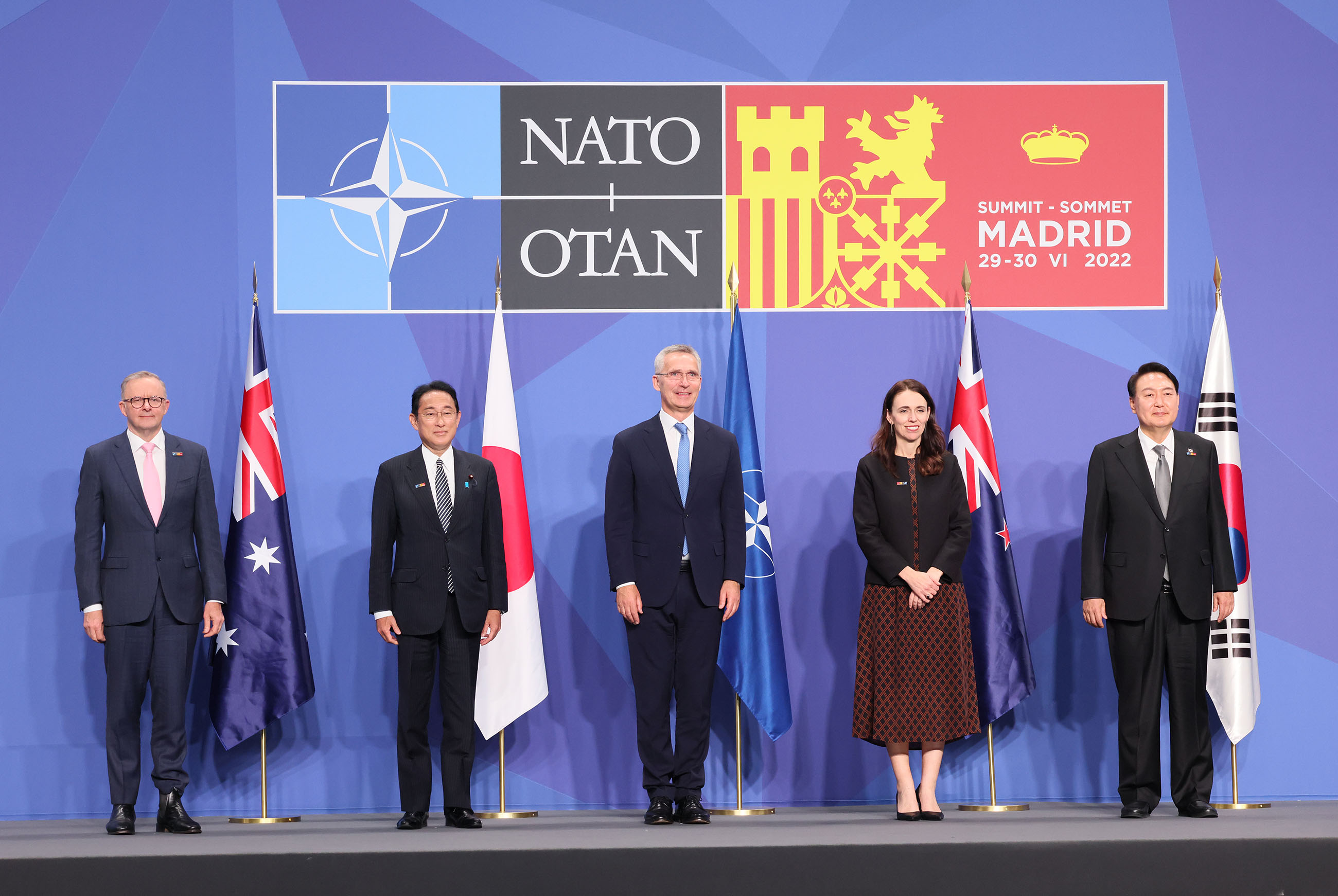
Stoltenberg with Anthony Albanese, Fumio Kishida, Jacinda Ardern and Yoon Suk-yeol at the 2022 Madrid summit

On 21 February 2022, Stoltenberg condemned Russia's diplomatic recognition of two self-proclaimed separatist republics in Donbas.

On 4 March 2022, Stoltenberg said NATO would not establish a no-fly zone over Ukraine. He said, "we are not part of this conflict, and we have a responsibility to ensure that it does not escalate and spread beyond Ukraine, because that would be even more devastating and more dangerous."

On 8 March 2022, Stoltenberg warned that if there is any Russia's attack "against any NATO country, NATO territory, that will trigger Article 5" of the North Atlantic Treaty.

On 23 March 2022, Stoltenberg accused China of providing political support to Russia, "including by spreading blatant lies and misinformation, and expressed concern that "China could provide material support for the Russian invasion".

On 28 March the establishment of four more multinational battlegroups in Bulgaria, Hungary, Romania and Slovakia was announced, although the Slovak battlegroup had already been announced on 27 February. This brings the total number of multinational battlegroups to eight, and Stoltenberg said ahead of an extraordinary NATO summit scheduled for March 24 in Brussels that "we will have eight multinational NATO battle groups all along the Eastern flank from the Baltic to the Black Sea". The Baltic Sea is guarded by the NATO Enhanced Forward Presence, to which the four more would be added. A multinational brigade headquarters exists in Craiova, Romania and this seems to be the distribution point of the extra four battlegroups. The summit statements by Biden and NATO were somewhat controversial.

=== Accession of Finland and Sweden to NATO ===
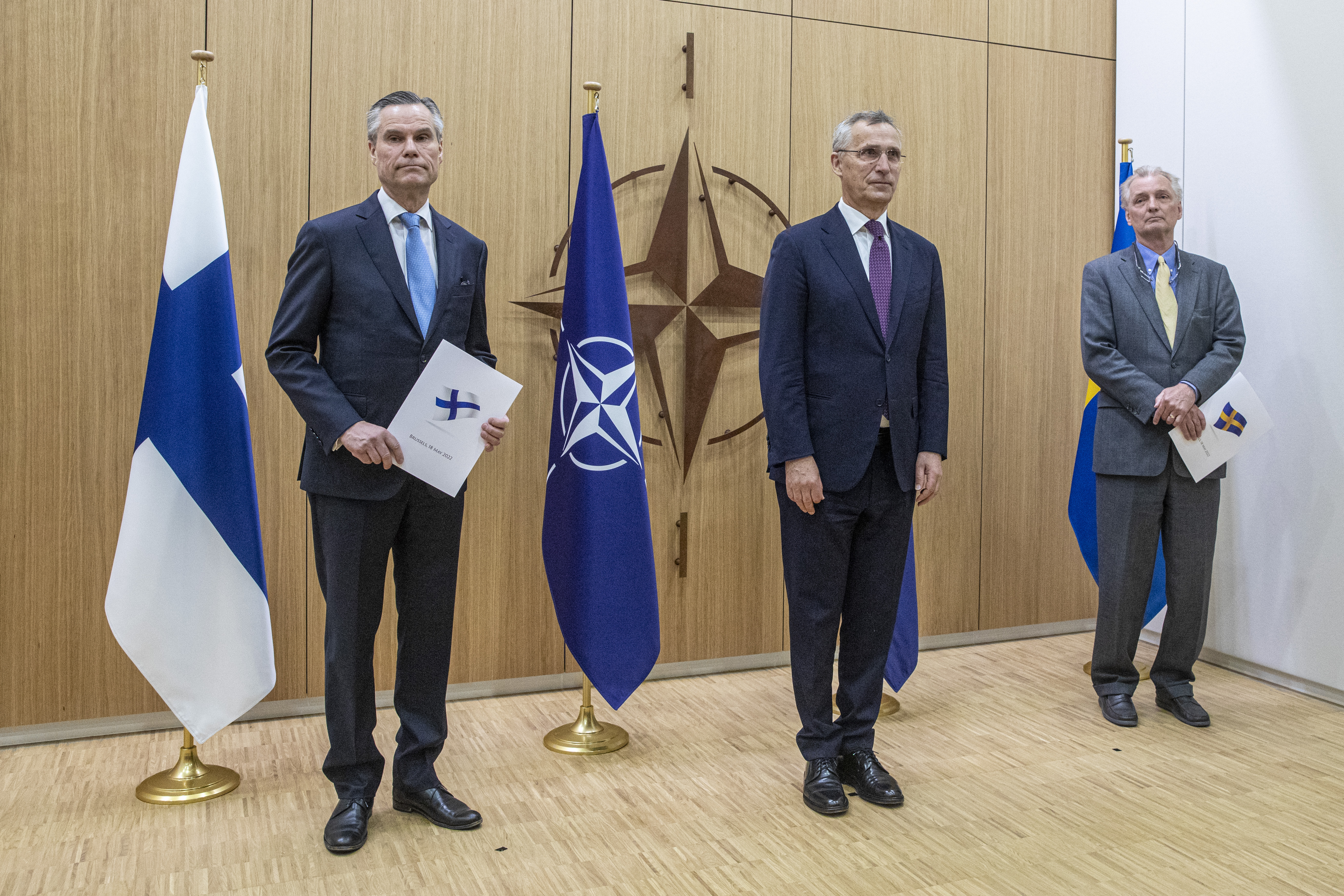
Stoltenberg with Finnish ambassador to NATO Klaus Korhonen and Swedish ambassador to NATO Axel Wernhoff at the membership application submission ceremony in Brussels, 18 May 2022

In May 2022 Stoltenberg said Finland and Sweden would be welcomed "with open arms" to NATO if they apply for membership to the alliance. While most current NATO members responded positively to the applications, Turkish president Recep Tayyip Erdoğan voiced his opposition, accusing both Finland and Sweden of tolerating Kurdish militant groups PKK and the YPG, which Turkey classifies as terrorist organizations, and followers of Fethullah Gülen, whom Turkey accuses of orchestrating a failed 2016 Turkish coup d'état attempt. Stoltenberg said that Turkey has "legitimate concerns" about Finland and Sweden joining the alliance. Stoltenberg spearheaded the membership negotiations with Turkey, as well as the efforts to bring Finland to NATO on 4 April 2023, and Sweden on 7 March 2024.

In June, Stoltenberg warned that the war in Ukraine could last for years, saying that "We must not let up in supporting Ukraine. Even if the costs are high, not only for military support, also because of rising energy and food prices."

On 30 November at the Bucharest meeting of NATO Foreign Ministers, were invited their counterparts from Moldova, Bosnia and Georgia, as well as Finland and Sweden. In his closing press conference Stoltenberg said that NATO expressed its solidarity with all three partners and also that "if there is one lesson learned from Ukraine it is that we need to support them now. The more support we are able to provide to these countries. The more support we are able to provide to these countries... under Russian pressure and influence in different ways... it is much better to support them now than when we have seen developments going in absolutely the wrong direction as we saw with the invasion of Ukraine earlier this year."

In December, he said in an interview that "there is no doubt that a full-fledged" war between Russia and NATO is a "possibility". Stoltenberg said that Putin is planning a long war in Ukraine and is ready to launch new offensives.

=== 2023 ===
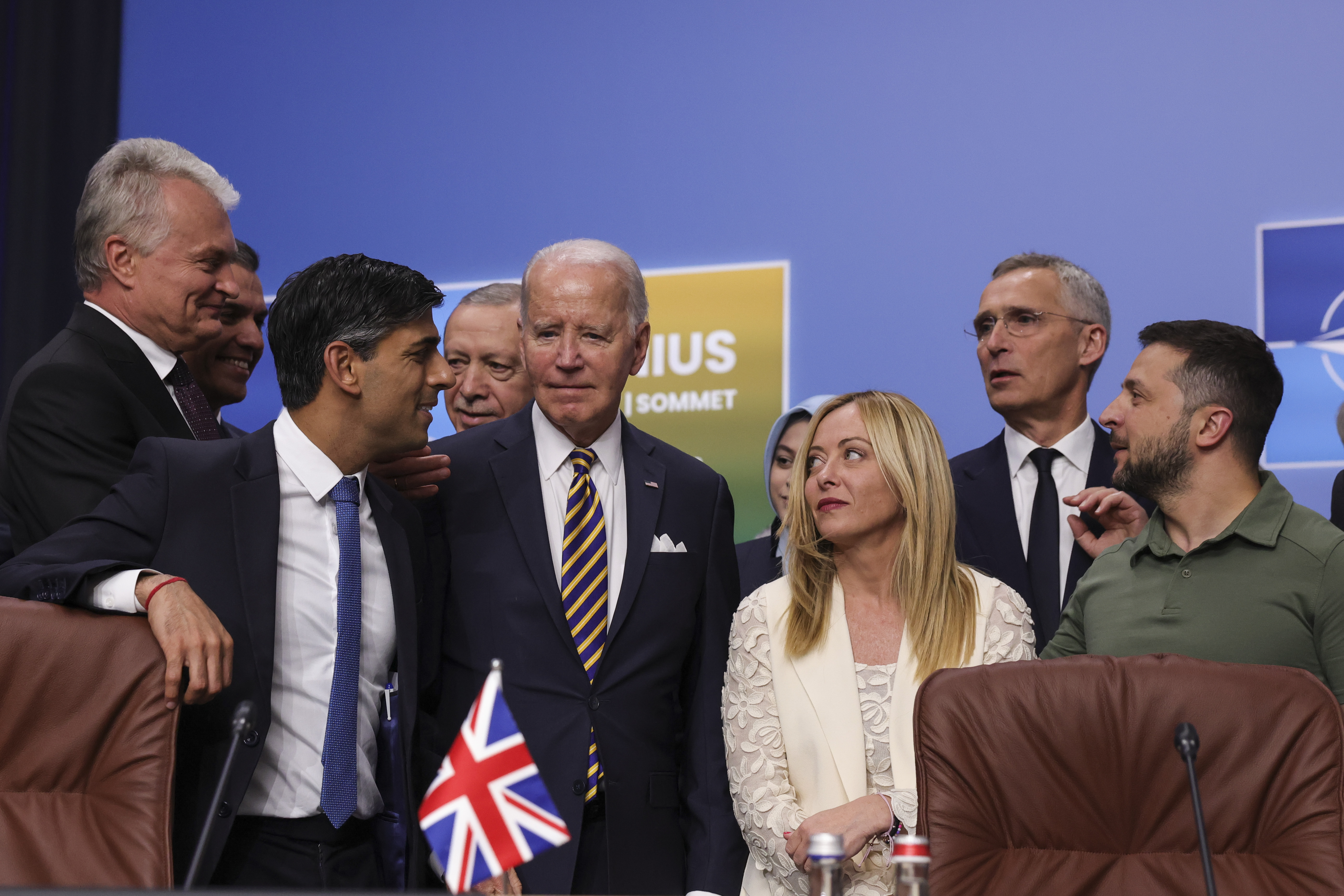
Stoltenberg with Volodymyr Zelenskyy, Giorgia Meloni, Joe Biden, Rishi Sunak, Gitanas Nausėda and Recep Tayyip Erdoğan at the 2023 Vilnius summit

Following the 2023 Chinese balloon incident between 28 January and 4 February, Stoltenberg said the incident said the balloon "confirms a pattern of Chinese behavior where we see that China has invested heavily in new capabilities, including different types of surveillance and intelligence platforms", and that it presents security challenges for the members of NATO.

On 12 February, a NATO spokesperson said Stoltenberg had no intention of seeking a fourth extension of his term as NATO secretary-general, after the German newspaper Welt am Sonntag reported member states wanted him to stay on while the Russo-Ukrainian War continues. On 13 February, Stoltenberg said that Russian President Vladimir Putin is "sending thousands and thousands of more troops, accepting a very high rate of casualty, taking big losses, but putting pressure on the Ukrainians. What Russia lacks in quality, they try to compensate in quantity." He said that President Putin and the decision makers in Moscow are the only ones responsible for the Russo-Ukrainian War and it is necessary for NATO member countries to continue providing military aid to Ukraine.

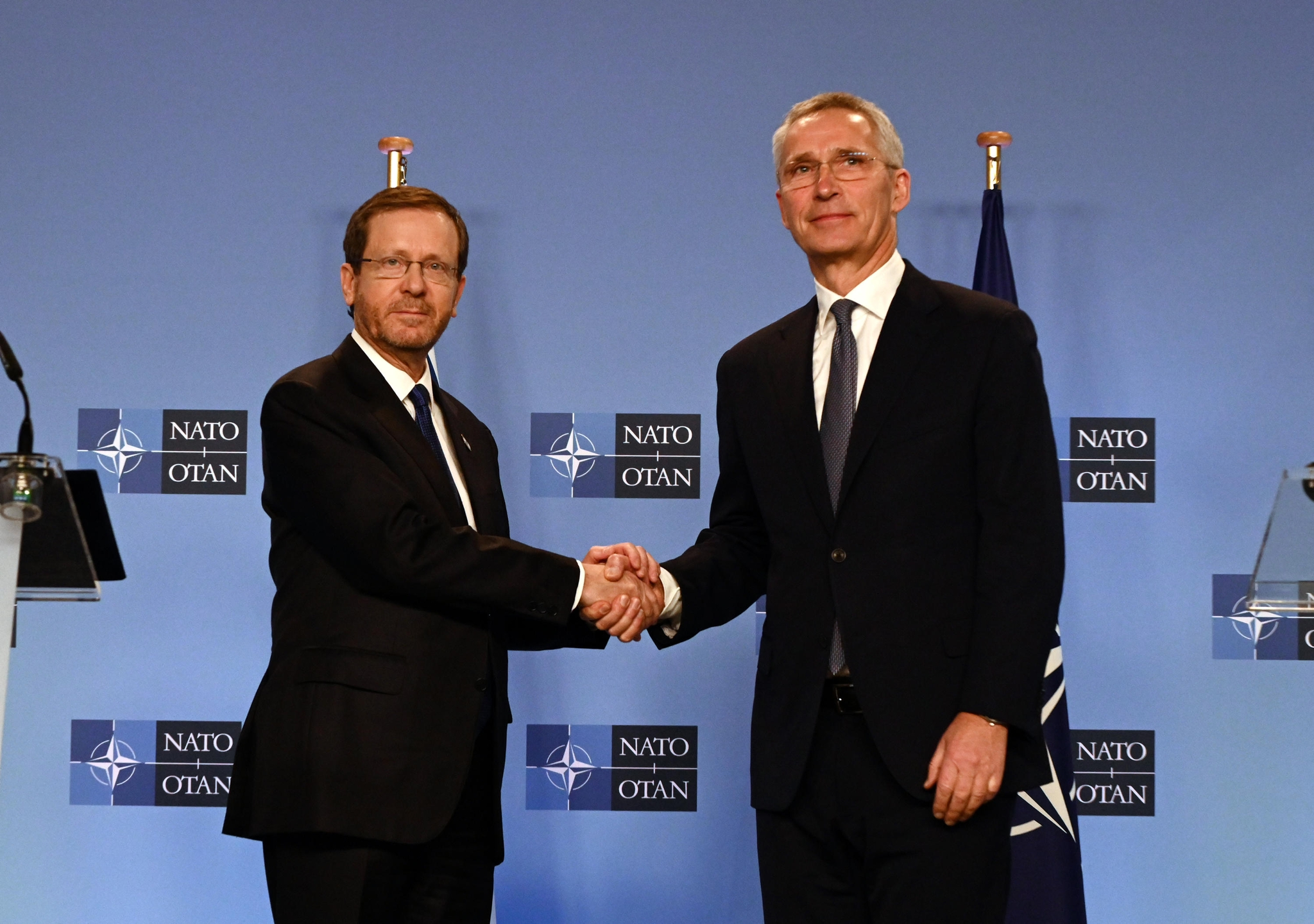
Stoltenberg and Israeli President Isaac Herzog at NATO headquarters in Brussels

On 14 June, Stoltenberg expressed support for Ukraine's counter-offensive against Russia to recapture the occupied territories of Ukraine and called on Western countries to send more weapons to the Ukrainian armed forces.

On 4 July, Stoltenberg was confirmed to receive a fourth extension of his mandate as NATO Secretary General to 1 October 2024, which would make his tenure as Secretary General at least a decade long.

In September 2023, Stoltenberg warned that we "must prepare ourselves for a long war in Ukraine", saying that "if President Zelenskyy and the Ukrainians stop fighting, their country will no longer exist."

In October 2023, Stoltenberg condemned Hamas' actions during the Gaza war and expressed his support to Israel and its right to self-defense. Stoltenberg warned Iran and Hezbollah not to get involved in Israel's war with Hamas.

=== 2024 ===
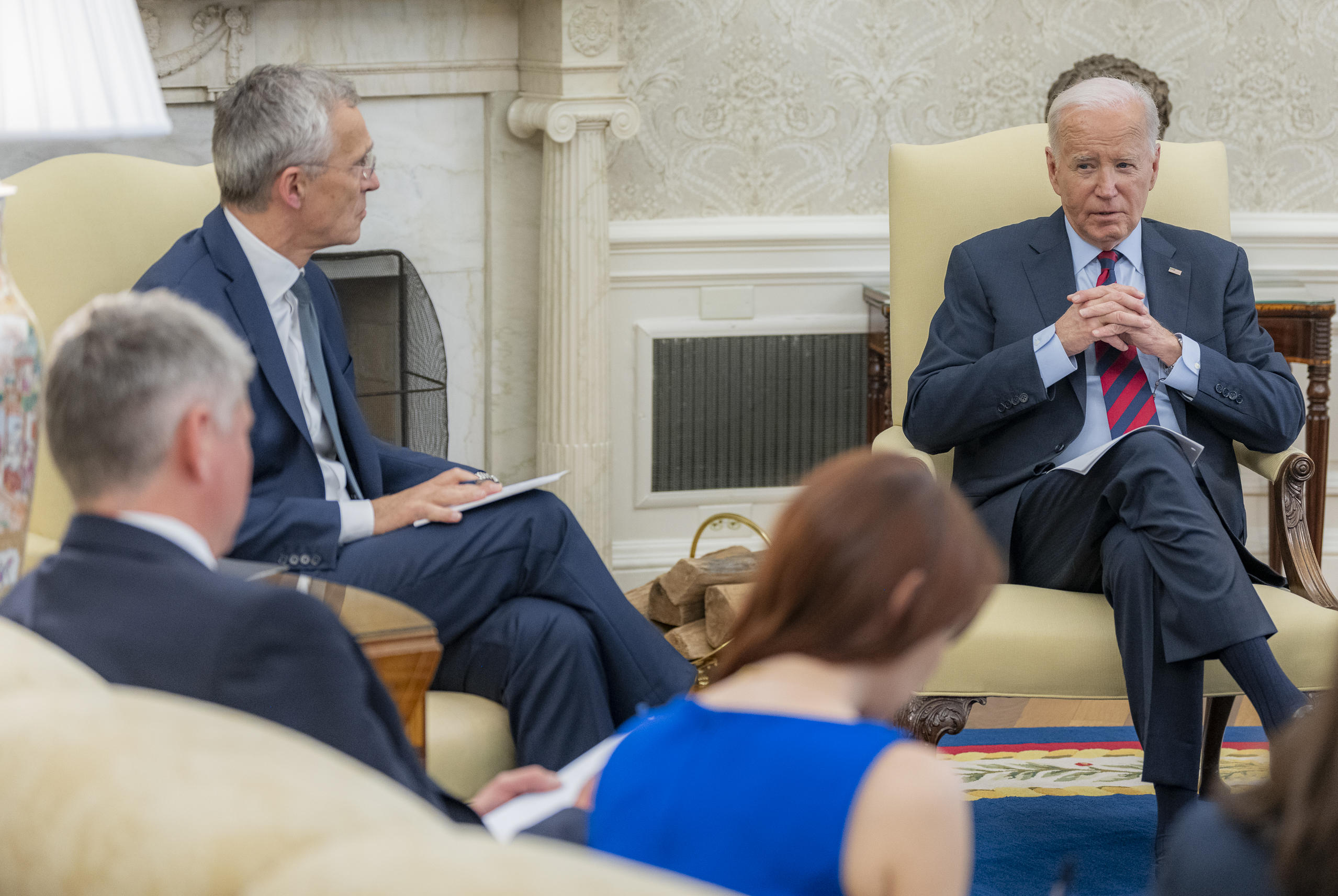
Stoltenberg with US President Joe Biden in June 2024

In February 2024, Stoltenberg warned that NATO member states have to prepare for a confrontation with Russia "that could last decades". He said that the best defense tools against Russia are an increase in arms supplies to Ukraine and an increase in NATO's military capabilities.

In February, Stoltenberg criticized Donald Trump's statement that he would "encourage" Russia to attack NATO member countries that don't pay their "fair share" of defense funding, stating that any attack on the military alliance would be met with a "united and forceful response".

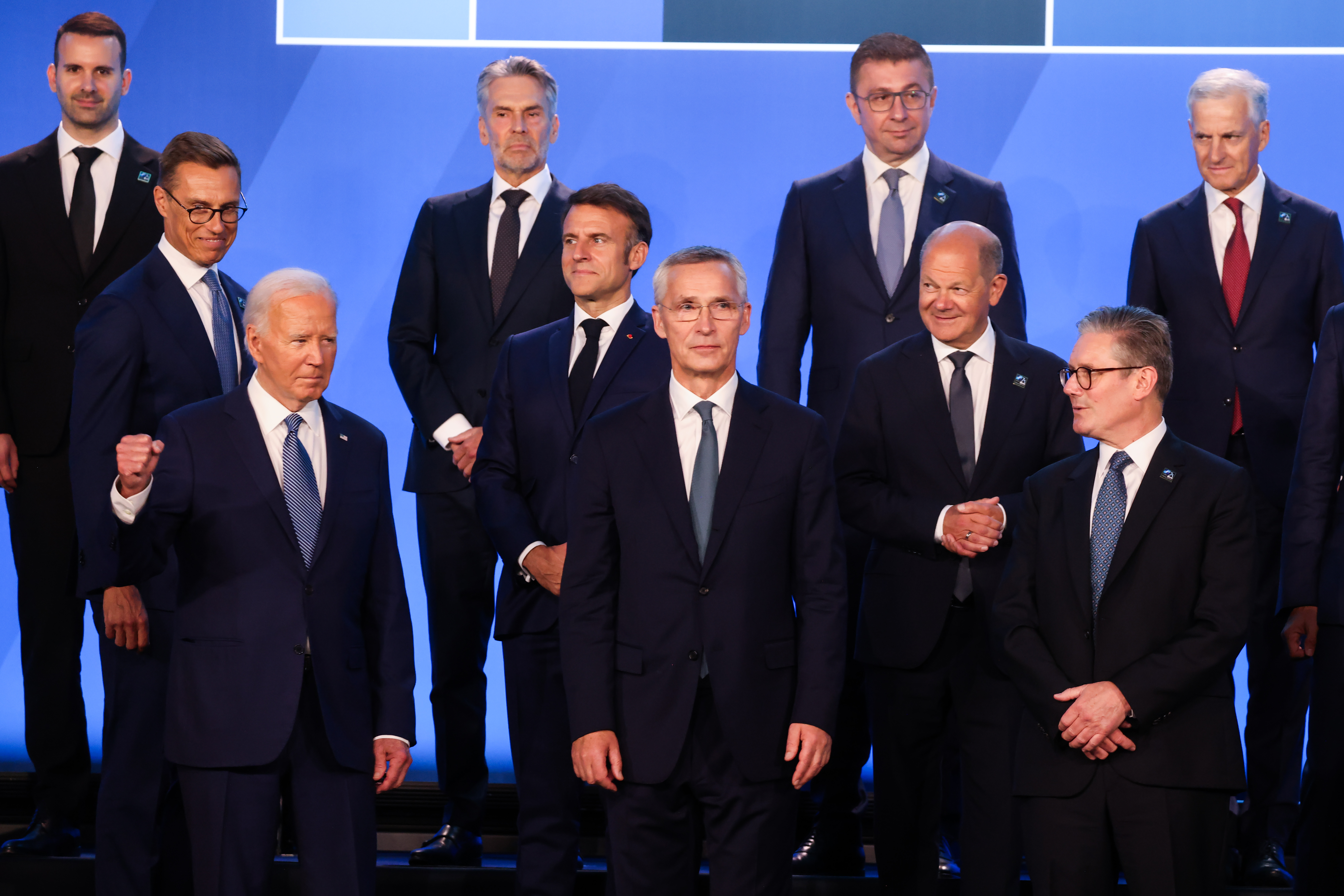
Stoltenberg at his last NATO summit as Secretary-General in July 2024

In May, Stoltenberg called on NATO member states to allow Ukraine to use Western-supplied weapons to strike targets inside Russia. Responding to Stoltenberg's statement, Italian Defence Minister Guido Crosetto stated that it is "wrong to increase tension" in an already "dramatic" situation and emphasised the need to "leave open the possibility of negotiating an immediate truce and initiating peace talks in the coming months."

Asked about China's military aid to Russia, Stoltenberg said that "Russia would not have been able to conduct the war of aggression against Ukraine without the support from China." He warned that "China cannot have it both ways. They cannot continue to have normal trade relationships with countries in Europe and at the same time fuel the biggest war we have seen in Europe since the Second World War."

"I know I am leaving NATO in good hands."

— Jens Stoltenberg on Mark Rutte being selected to succeed him as Secretary-General

On 9 July 2024, Stoltenberg was awarded the Presidential Medal of Freedom, the highest civilian honour in the United States, from United States President Joe Biden for his services to NATO during the Russo-Ukrainian war. This award was given at the NATO Summit in Washington, DC.

On 30 July 2024, King Felipe VI of Spain appointed Stoltenberg Knight Grand Cross of the Order of Civil Merit.

In an interview in September 2024, Stoltenberg was asked What could have been done differently, what should have been done, to prevent Russia from going to war against Ukraine?

He answered that he regrets that NATO allies and NATO itself did not do more to strengthen Ukraine before Russia's invasion of Ukraine began. Potentially, the threshold for Russia to attack would have been higher if Ukraine had been militarily stronger. The USA, Canada and the UK trained Ukrainian soldiers in a training center in Ukraine, but NATO did not. NATO could have given much more training and equipment.

On 18 June, it was announced Hungary and Slovakia had agreed to allow outgoing Dutch Prime Minister Mark Rutte to succeed Stoltenberg as Secretary General. He was officially selected by the North Atlantic Council on 26 June, and succeeded Stoltenberg on 1 October.

=== Nomination for governorship of the Norges Bank ===
In December 2021, it was reported that he sought the governorship of Norges Bank, Norway's central bank.

It was speculated that Stoltenberg would be nominated as Governor of the Norges Bank, which sources told Dagens Næringsliv in November 2021, said he would accept if he was nominated for the position. Stoltenberg's press advisor, Sissel Kruse Larsen, told Dagens Næringsliv that it was still too early to say what Stoltenberg would do once he returns home to Norway. Stoltenberg confirmed on 14 December that he had applied for the position, and specified that he had told the Ministry of Finance that he could not ascend to the position before his term as NATO Secretary-General had expired on 1 October 2022.

His nomination was controversial prior to being officially announced, due to his links to the Labour Party, friendship with Prime Minister Jonas Gahr Støre and concerns for the independence of the central bank. His pre-nomination was opposed by all opposition parties, with support only coming from the government parties and the Christian Democratic Party.

His appointment was officially announced on 4 February 2022. However, after a NATO summit in March 2022 concerning the Russian invasion of Ukraine, Stoltenberg accepted a renewed term of one year to continue as NATO secretary-general and thereby resigned as incoming central bank governor. Acting Governor Ida Wolden Bache was instead given the term that Stoltenberg was meant to take on.

== Post-NATO career ==
=== Munich Security Conference ===
On 8 October 2024, it was announced that Stoltenberg would be the next Chairman of the Munich Security Conference (MSC). Together with Helga Maria Schmid, he will assume the role as Co-Chair of the MSC beginning with the conference in 2027.

=== Bilderberg Group ===
On 8 November 2024 Stoltenberg was appointed Chairman of the Steering Committee of the Bilderberg Group, an annual private conference attended by political leaders, business executives, academics, and media representatives. The group, known for its off-the-record discussions on global affairs, has been a gathering place for high-profile figures in government and finance. His appointment placed him in a leadership role within the organization's decision-making structure.

=== December 2024 views on Ukraine ===
In December 2024 Stoltenberg expressed support for the accelerated accession of Ukraine to NATO, saying, "Where there is a will, there is a way to find a solution. But you need a line which defines where Article 5 is invoked, and Ukraine has to control all the territory until that border." He said that Ukraine could temporarily give up territories occupied by Russia in exchange for peace.

=== Minister of Finance (2025–present) ===
On 4 February 2025, following the collapse of the coalition between the Centre Party and the Labour Party, Stoltenberg succeeded Trygve Slagsvold Vedum, the leader of the Centre Party, as Norway's Minister of Finance. Stoltenberg resigned from his position as chairman of the MSC, but he still plans to return to the MSC after his tenure as minister. Much like his position in the MSC, Stoltenberg also stepped down as head of the steering committee of the Bilderberg Group to focus entirely on his responsibilities as finance minister.

==== Tenure ====
A week into his tenure, Stoltenberg was a part of the Norwegian delegation at the 61st Munich Security Conference. He warned the United States against not allowing Ukraine to be a part of negotiations over a peace treaty with Russia over the war in Ukraine.

Stoltenberg launched an initiative to seek a compromise solution on tax settlement in March, which most of the opposition turned down with the exception of the Greens and the Red Party. Despite this setback, he expressed continued optimism about the proposal and cited the heightened global situation and the necessity to seek advise on how to change the tax system.

Stoltenberg accompanied prime minister Jonas Gahr Støre during his visit to Washington, D.C. in April to meet US President Donald Trump to discuss US–Norway relations, the war in Ukraine and Norway's role in the Arctic.

During the summer of 2025, he came under fire for the Government Pension Fund of Norway investing in Israeli companies that contributed in the killing of civilians in Gaza. Stoltenberg argued that the fund's own Council on Ethics should evaluate whether or not they should sell themselves out of such companies. The fund eventually sold itself out of eleven companies out of sixty-one they had invested in, a move Stoltenberg supported. Stoltenberg was asked on several occasions by the Standing Committee on Scrutiny and Constitutional Affairs about his handling of the issue, but were unsatisfied with his responses. This came to a head following his response after the 2025 parliamentary election, with members expressing that the committee should open a case against him, but this would ultimately be decided by the new members of the committee once parliament has been constituted for the next parliamentary term.

He presented the government's budget for 2026 on 15 October. The budget notably detailed that young people would receive 500 million NOK in tax lottery, the price of electric vehicles would increase, Norway Price (Norgespris) would be retained and likewise the price for kindergarten slots, a lower tax on income and a change in the wealth tax. The proposed budget received criticism from both supporting and opposition parties, with the former highlighting lack of action for combatting inequality, green industry and environmental action and centralisation. The latter criticised it both for not prioritising crime and taxes and cutting in parental allowance.

After several revelations determined that the government had misled voters during the 2025 election campaign and contradicted their own budget proposals, Stoltenberg was confronted with his lack of presence to tackle the issue after going on a book tour. He emphasised that the book tour had been scheduled long before the budget controversy had arisen and further expressed that it was unfortunate that issues his party had campaigned on had been removed from the budget and that it was important to rectify their mistakes.

Ahead of the government's budget conference in March 2026, Stoltenberg announced that there would be more cuts in government spending ahead, including in 2027 and there would be at least 25 billion NOK in annual increased spending until 2029.

Stoltenberg received the report of the tax commission in June. He had previously set up the commission to look into how the Norwegian tax system could be reformed and their report suggested a cut in the wealth tax and an overall tax cut from around 4,1 to 23 trillion NOK. He also argued against the OECD's report about the Norwegian industry, although he did concede that there were issues with the economy, while also warning against "smearing Norway when there's hardly any other country with higher welfare, higher standard of living, more even distribution and where productivity is higher".

Stoltenberg presented the government's proposed state budget for 2027 in October. Some of the government's proposals included: cuts in car taxes by 1,2 trillion NOK and cheaper transport tickets, mail and delivery services once a week, price increase of Norway Price (Norgespris) and an increase of 2100 Army personnel. The budget received mixed support from other parties, with only the Liberal Party praising the proposal of tax cuts, but did criticise them for increasing prices for electric vehicles as a repercussion.

During the Atlantic Furure Forum in November, Stoltenberg praised Mark Rutte for his work at NATO and outlined how Vladimir Putin could be forced into negotiations if the price of occupying parts of Ukraine became too high. He also warned against "internal tariffs", alluding to the tariffs imposed by US President Donald Trump.

== Honours and medals ==
=== National honours and medals ===
- Norway: King Harald V's Jubilee Medal 1991–2016 (2016)

=== Foreign honours ===
- Belgium: Grand Cordon of the Order of Leopold (2024)
- Czech Republic: Member 3rd Class of the Order of Tomáš Garrigue Masaryk (2024)
- Estonia:
  - Member 1st Class of the Order of the Cross of Terra Mariana (2019)
  - Cross of Merit, 1st Class, Ministry of Foreign Affairs (2024)
- Finland: Grand Cross of the Order of the Lion of Finland (2024)
- Germany: Grand Cross 1st Class of the Order of Merit of the Federal Republic of Germany (2024)
- Japan: Grand Cordon of the Order of the Rising Sun (2025)
- Latvia: Member 1st Class of the Order of the Three Stars (2024)
- Lithuania:
  - Grand Cross of the Order of Vytautas the Great (2019)
  - Grand Cross of the Order of the Cross of Vytis (2023)
- Montenegro: Member 2nd Class of the Order of the Republic of Montenegro (2017)
- Netherlands: Knight Grand Cross of the Order of Orange-Nassau (2024)
- Ukraine: Member 1st Class of the Order of Prince Yaroslav the Wise (2023)
- United States of America:
  - Presidential Medal of Freedom (2024)
  - Department of Defense Medal for Distinguished Public Service (2024)
- Spain: Knight Grand Cross of the Order of Isabella the Catholic (2024)
- Sweden: Commander Grand Cross of the Order of the Polar Star (2024)

== Gallery ==
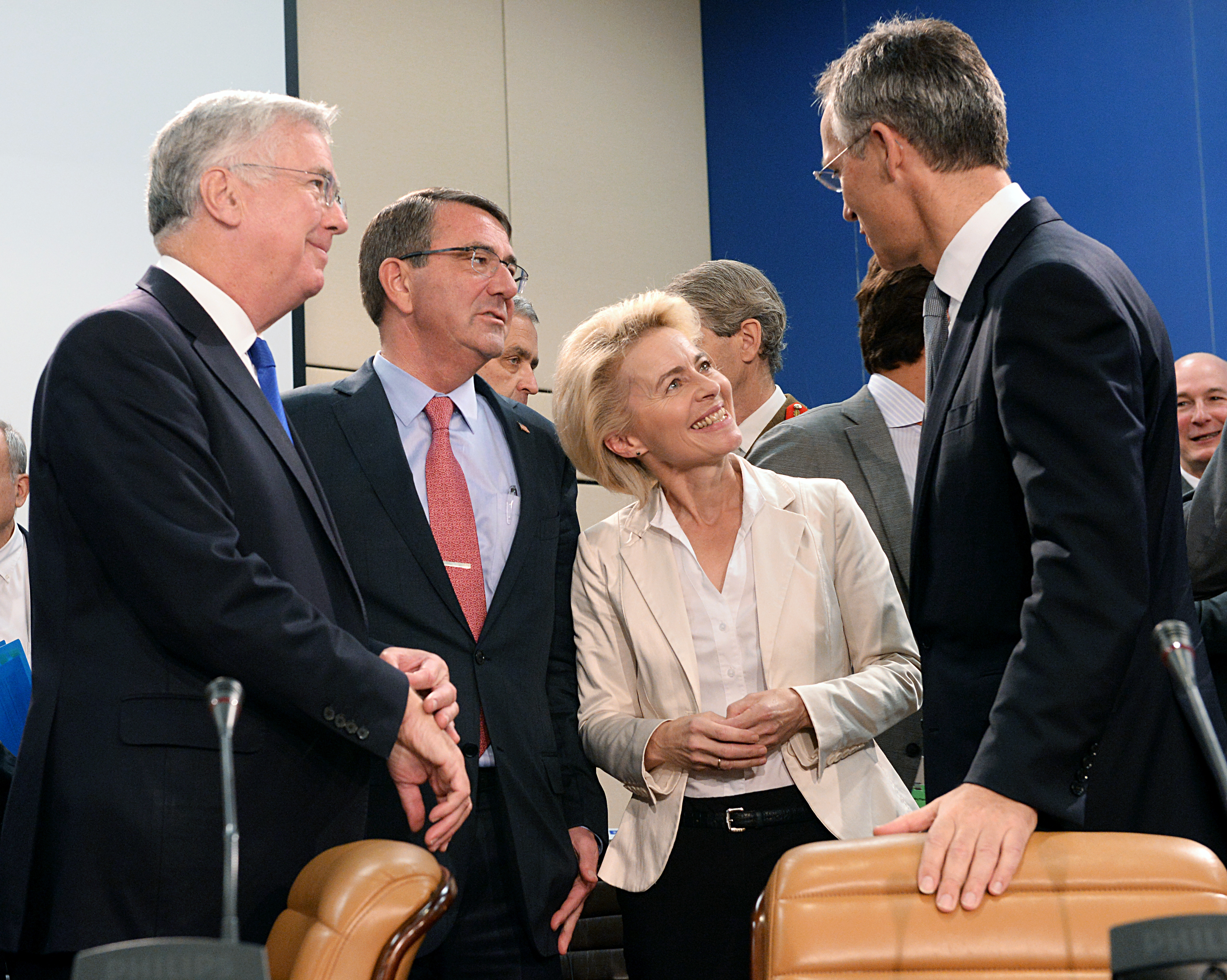
Stoltenberg with UK Defence Secretary Michael Fallon, US Defense Secretary Ash Carter, and German Defence Minister Ursula von der Leyen in Brussels, October 2015

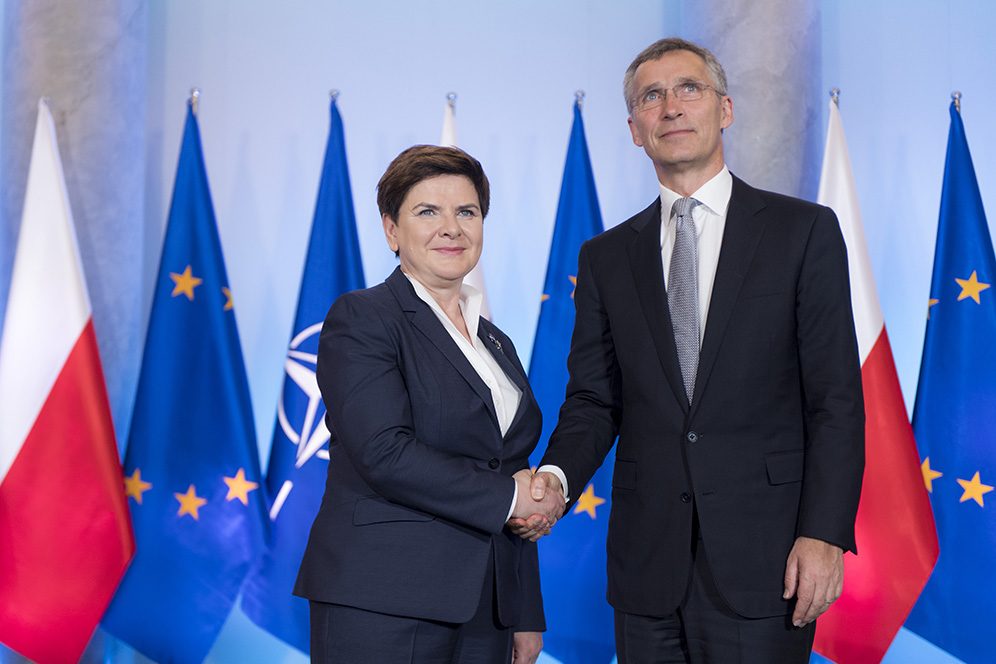
Stoltenberg and Polish Prime Minister Beata Szydło in Warsaw, 31 May 2016

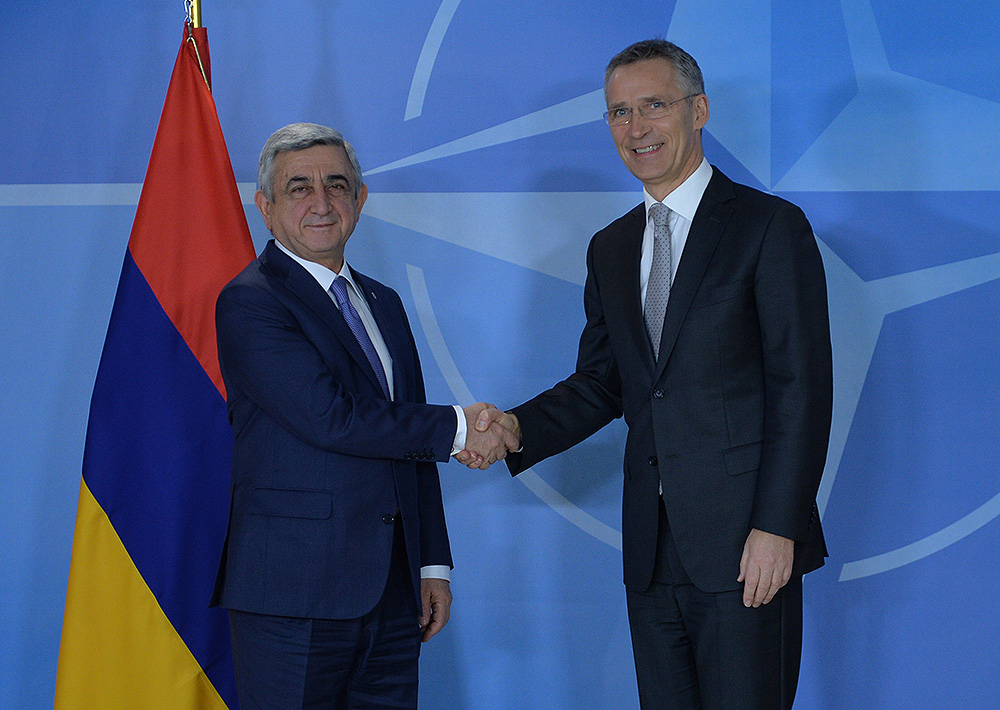
Stoltenberg and Armenian President Serzh Sargsyan in Brussels, 27 February 2017

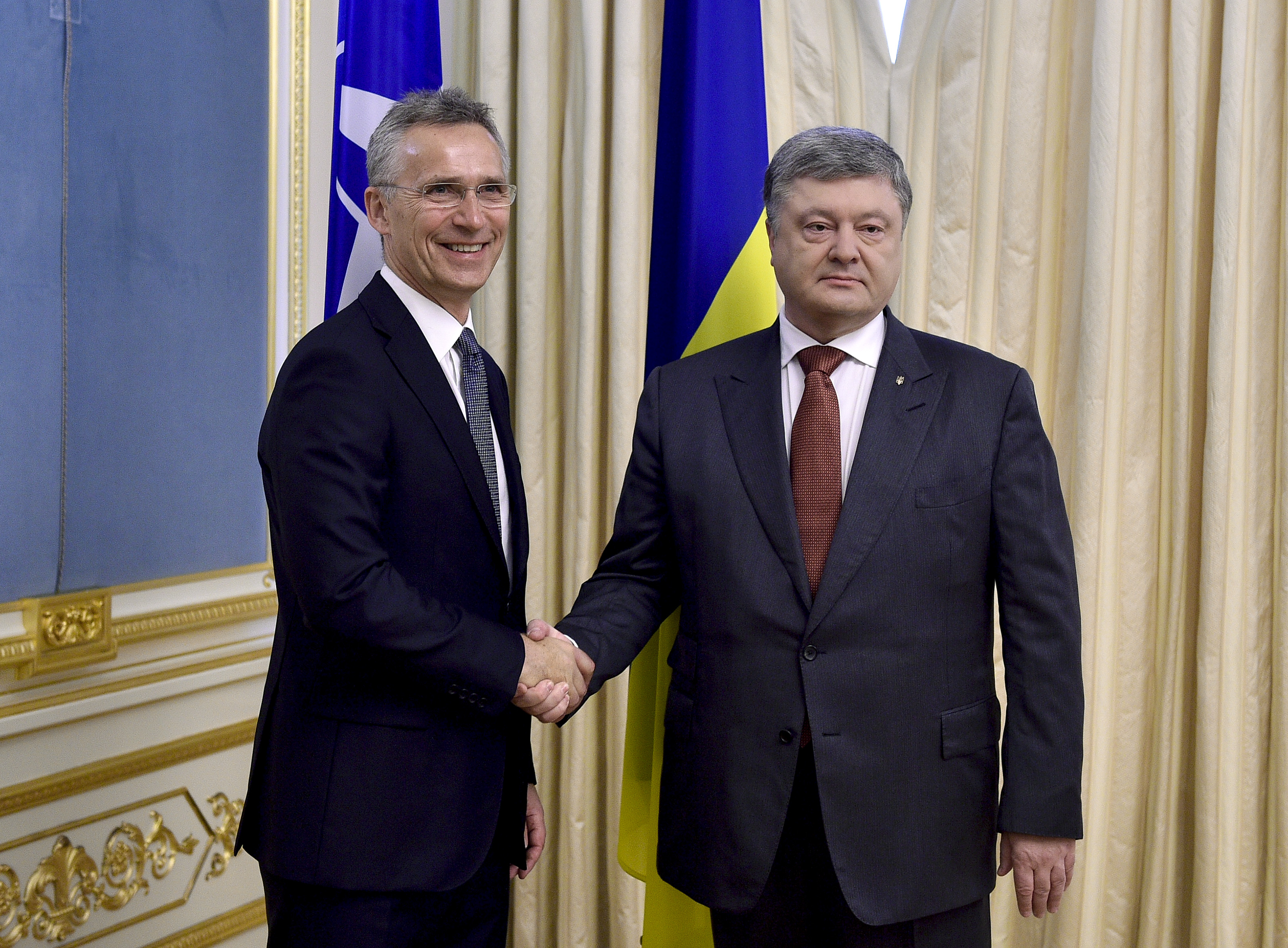
Stoltenberg and Ukrainian President Petro Poroshenko in Kyiv, 10 July 2017

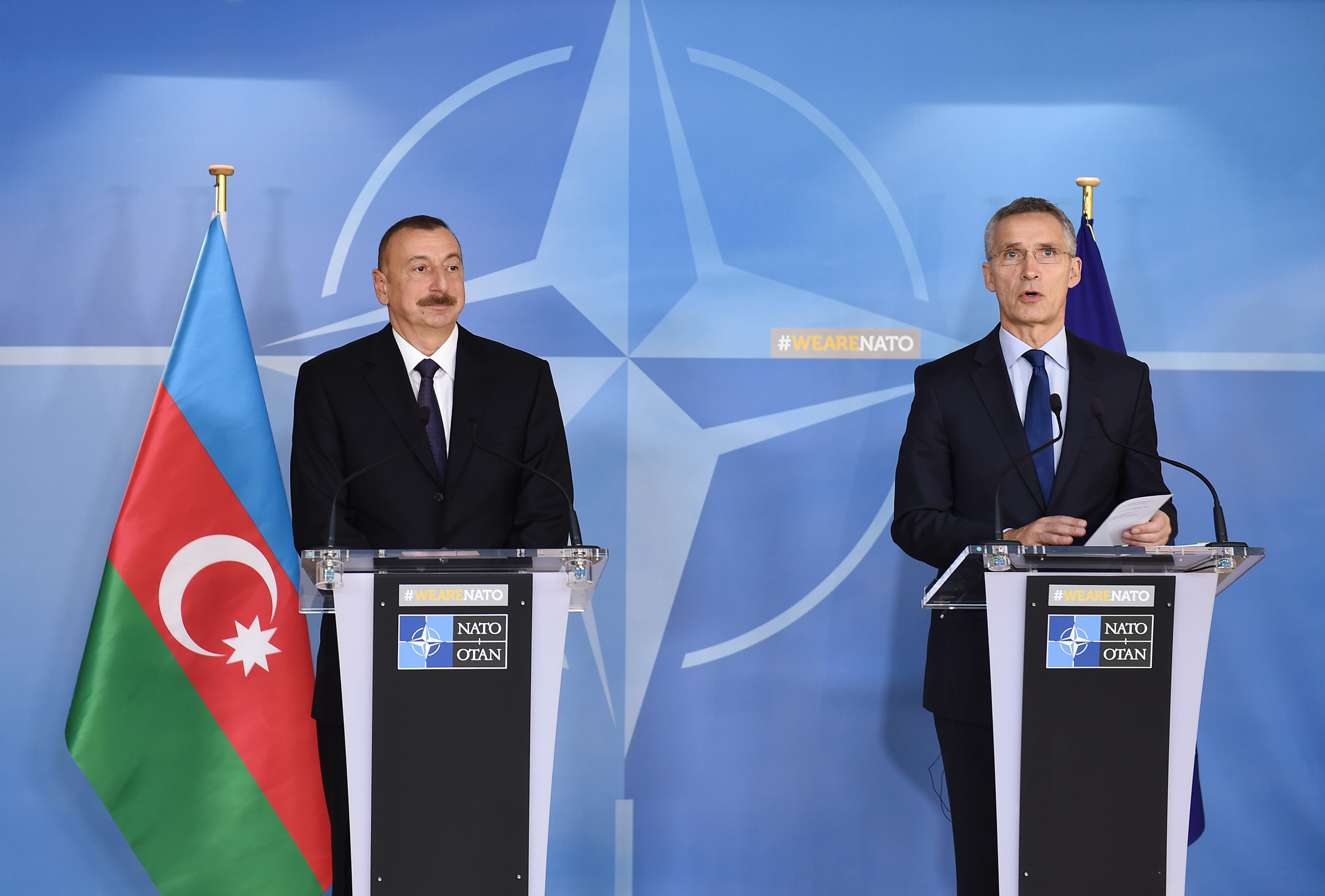
Stoltenberg and Azerbaijani President Ilham Aliyev in Brussels, 23 November 2017

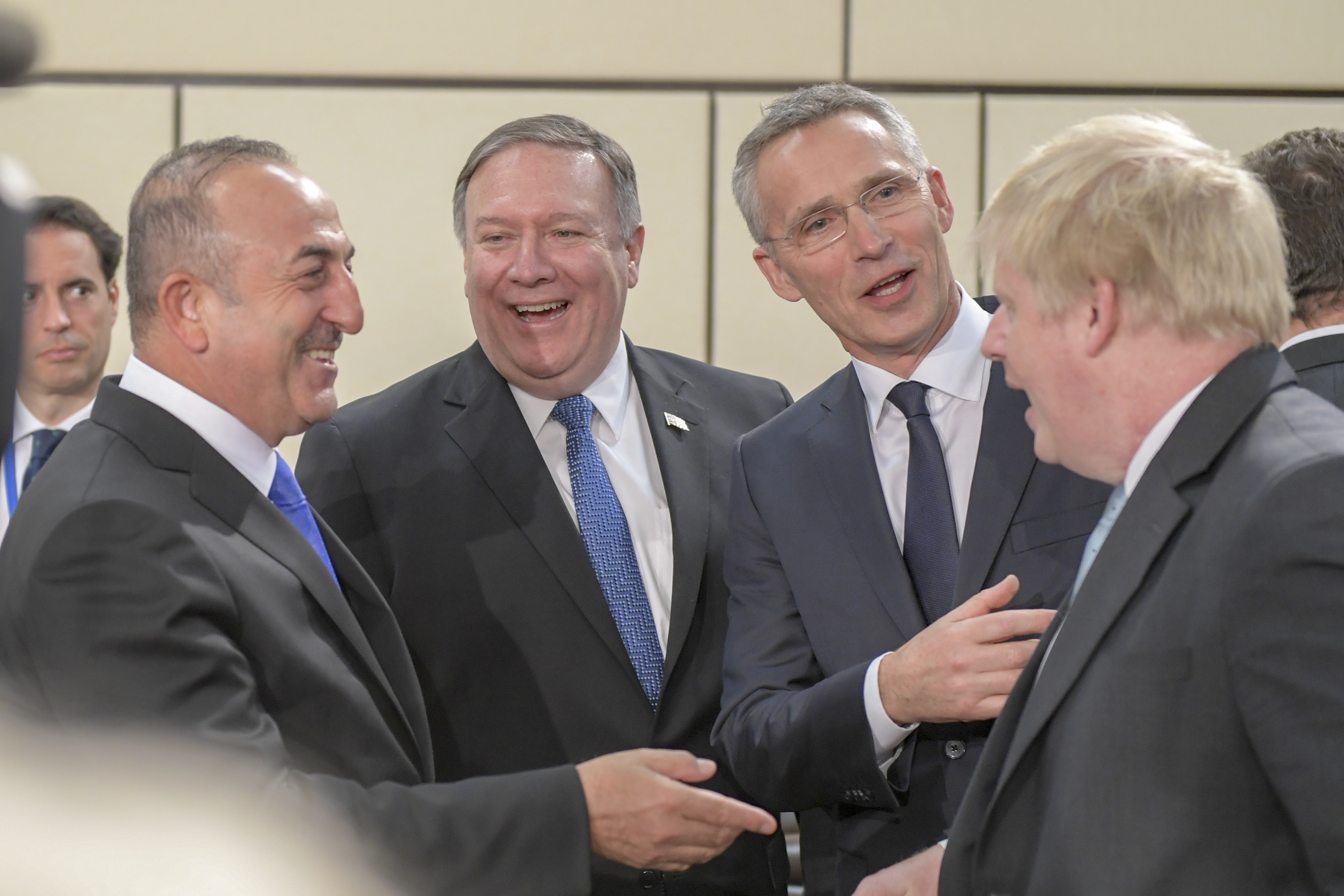
Stoltenberg with US Secretary of State Pompeo, UK Foreign Secretary Johnson, and Turkish Foreign Minister Çavuşoğlu, Brussels, April 2018

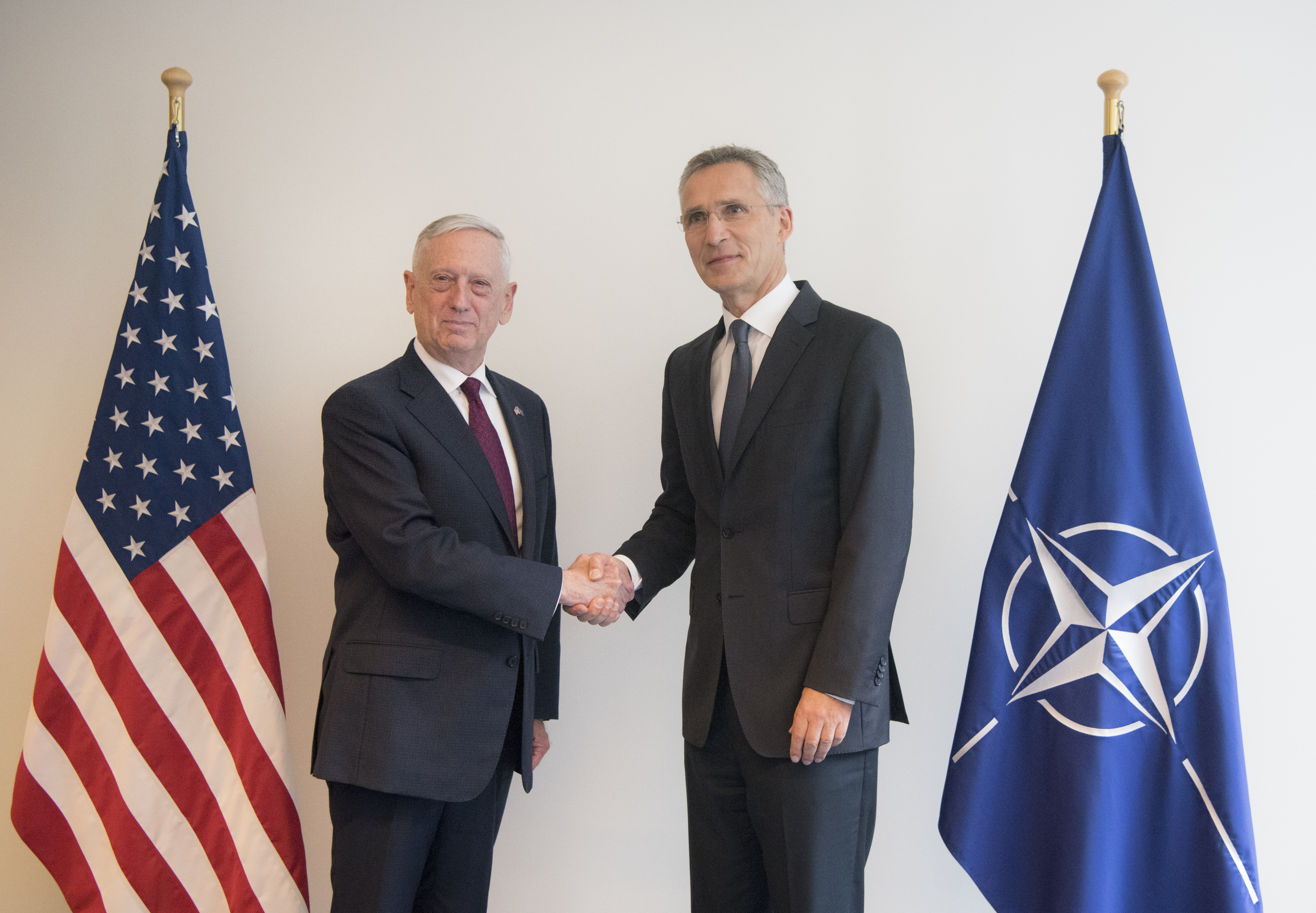
Stoltenberg and U.S. Secretary of Defense Jim Mattis in Brussels, 7 June 2018

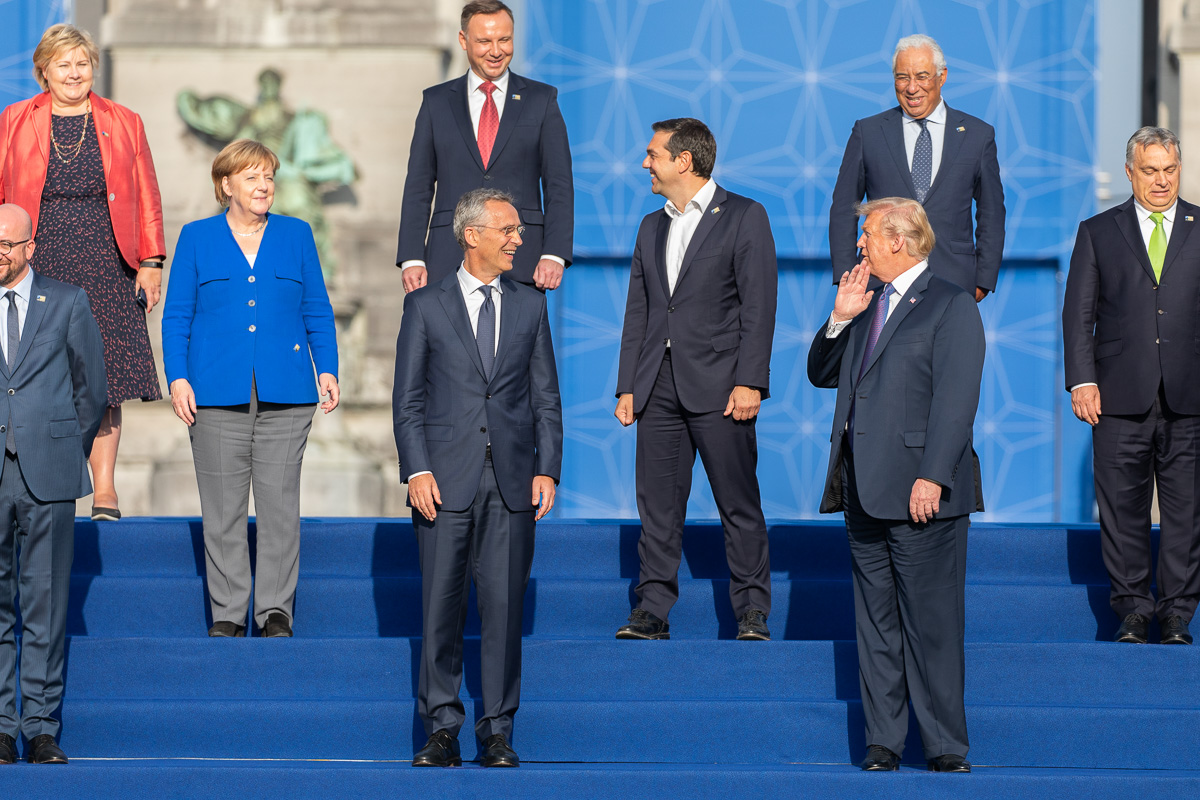
A meeting of NATO heads of States and governments on 11 July 2018 in Brussels

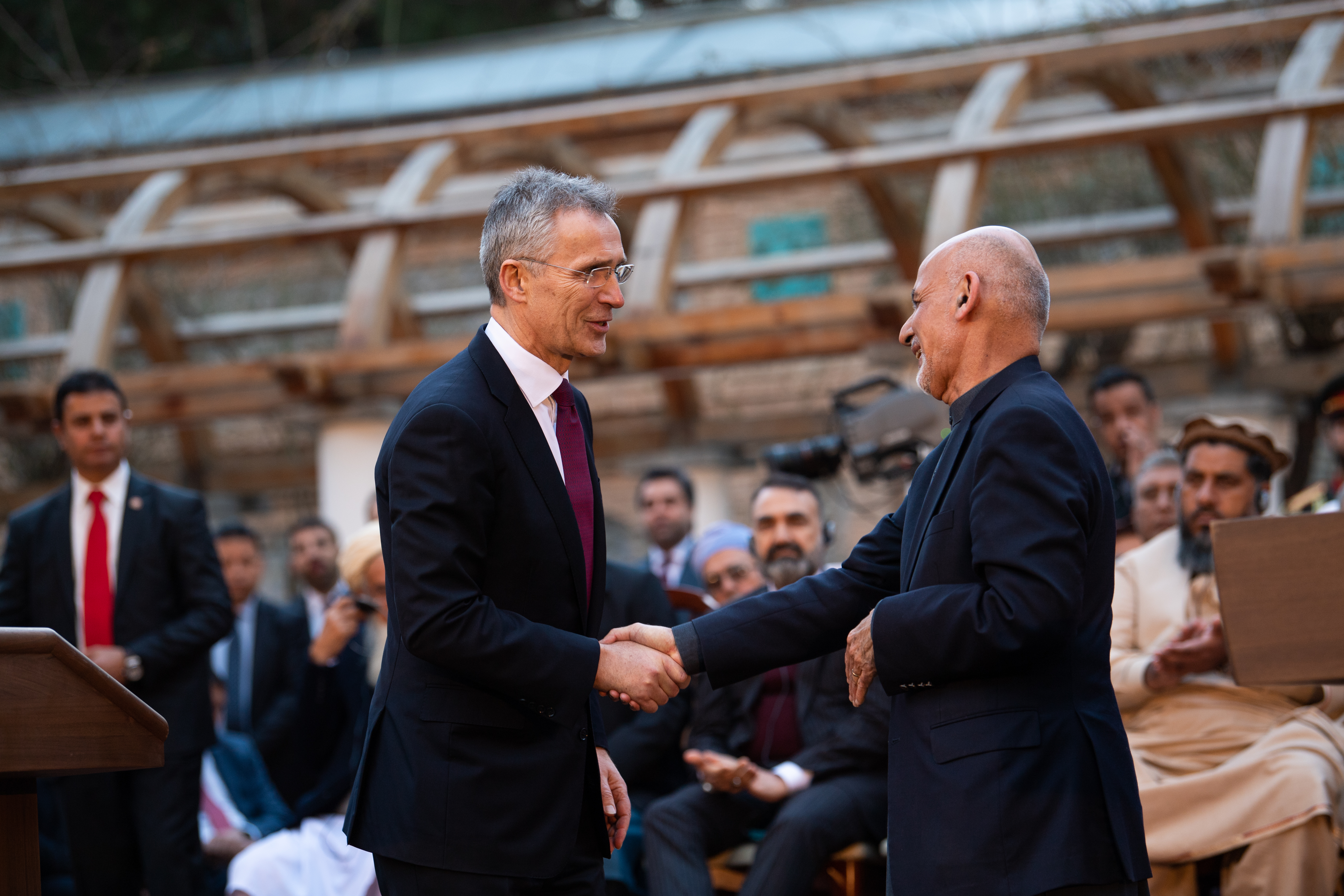
Stoltenberg with Afghan President Ashraf Ghani in Kabul, Afghanistan, February 2020

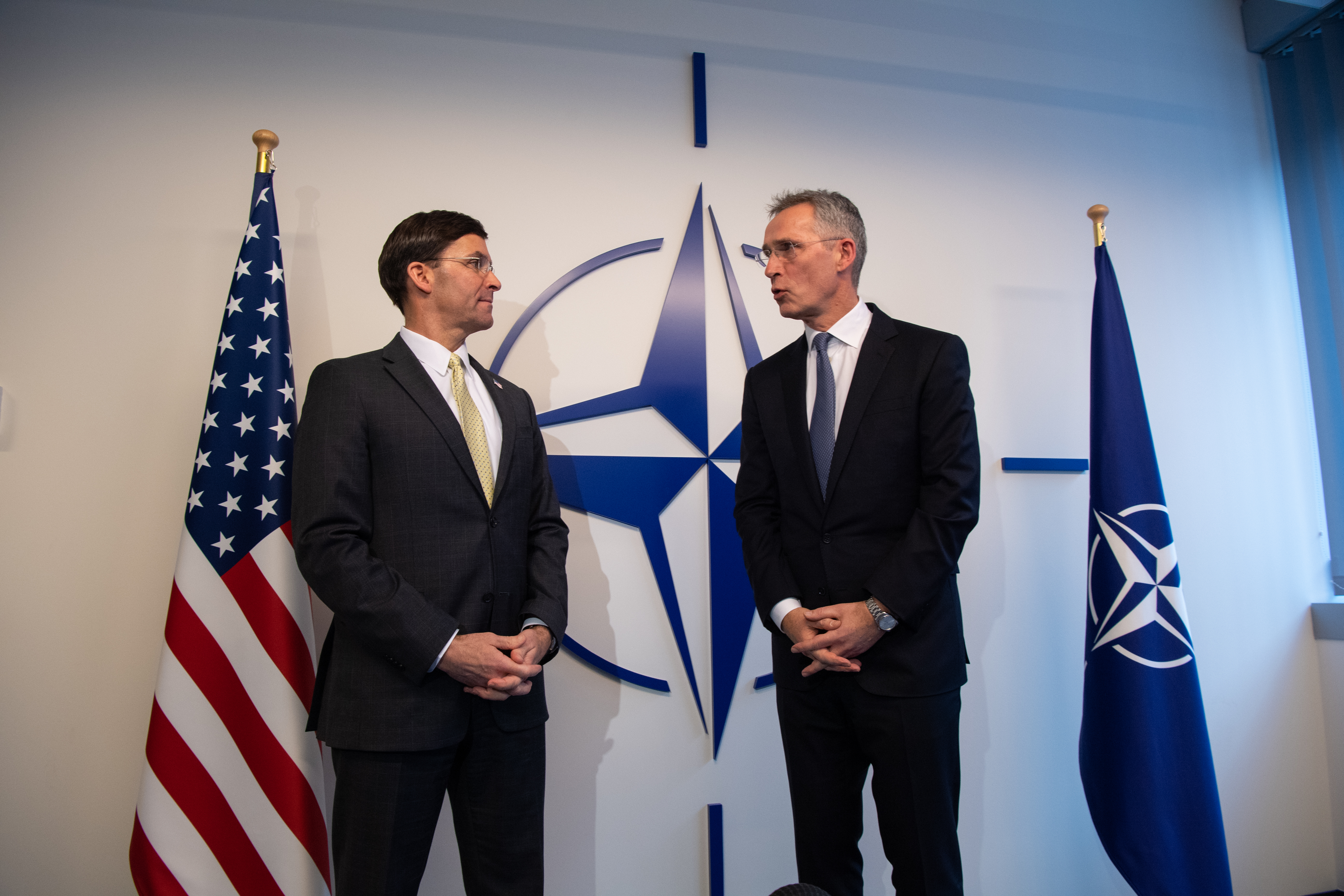
Stoltenberg with U.S. Defense Secretary Mark Esper in Brussels, 12 February 2020

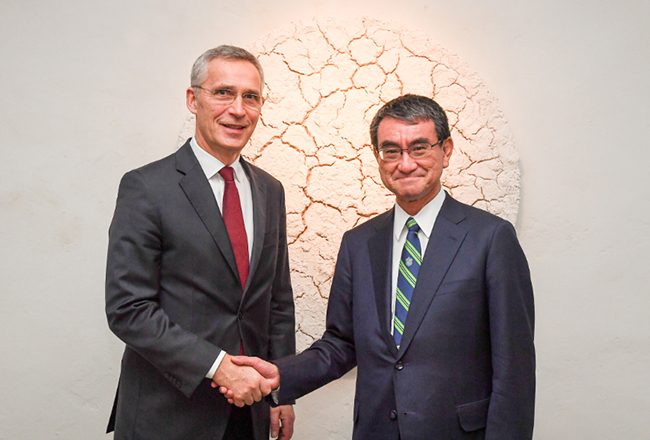
Stoltenberg with Japanese Defense Minister Taro Kono at the 56th Munich Security Conference in February 2020

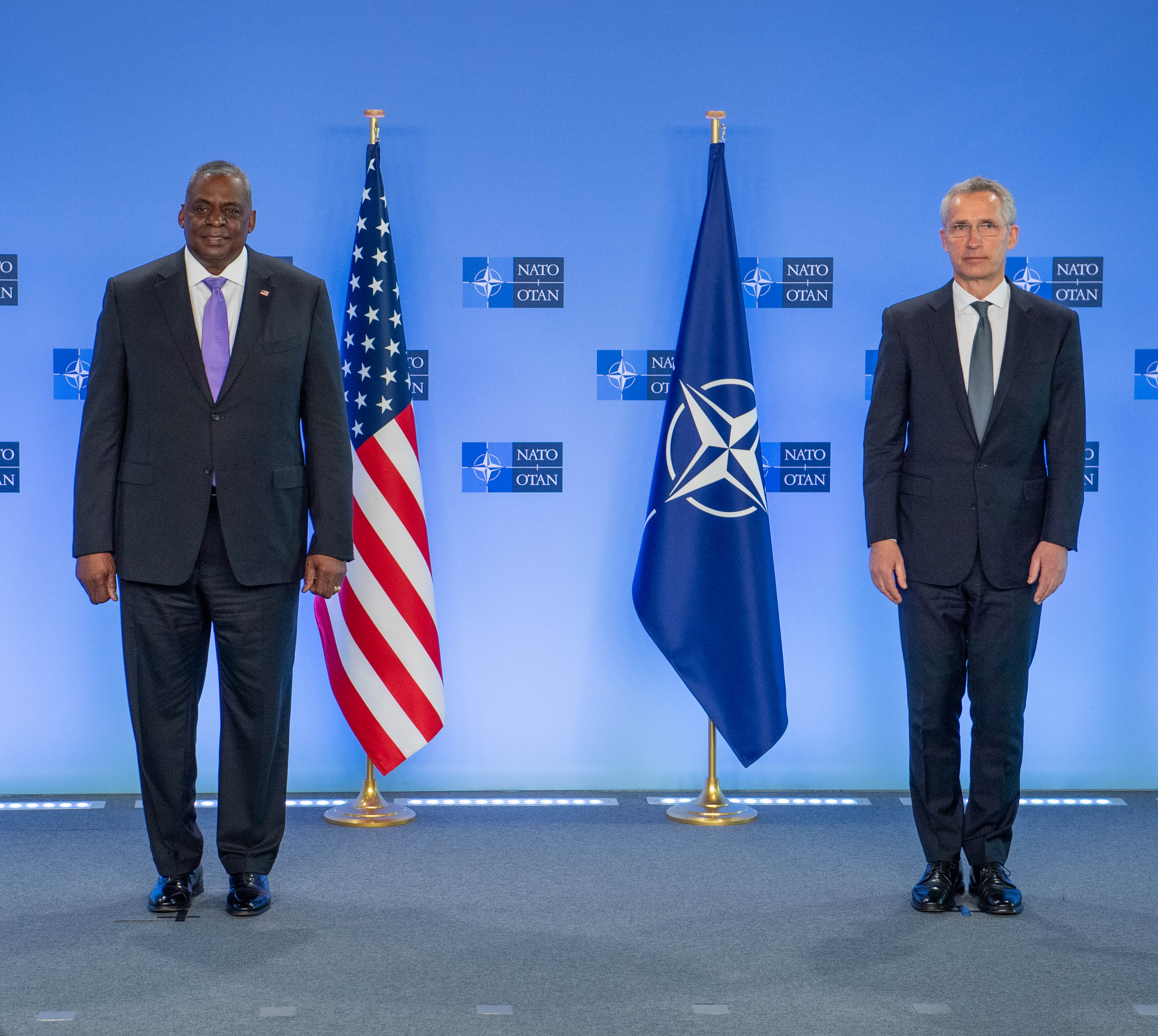
Stoltenberg and U.S. Secretary of Defense Lloyd Austin in Brussels, 14 April 2021

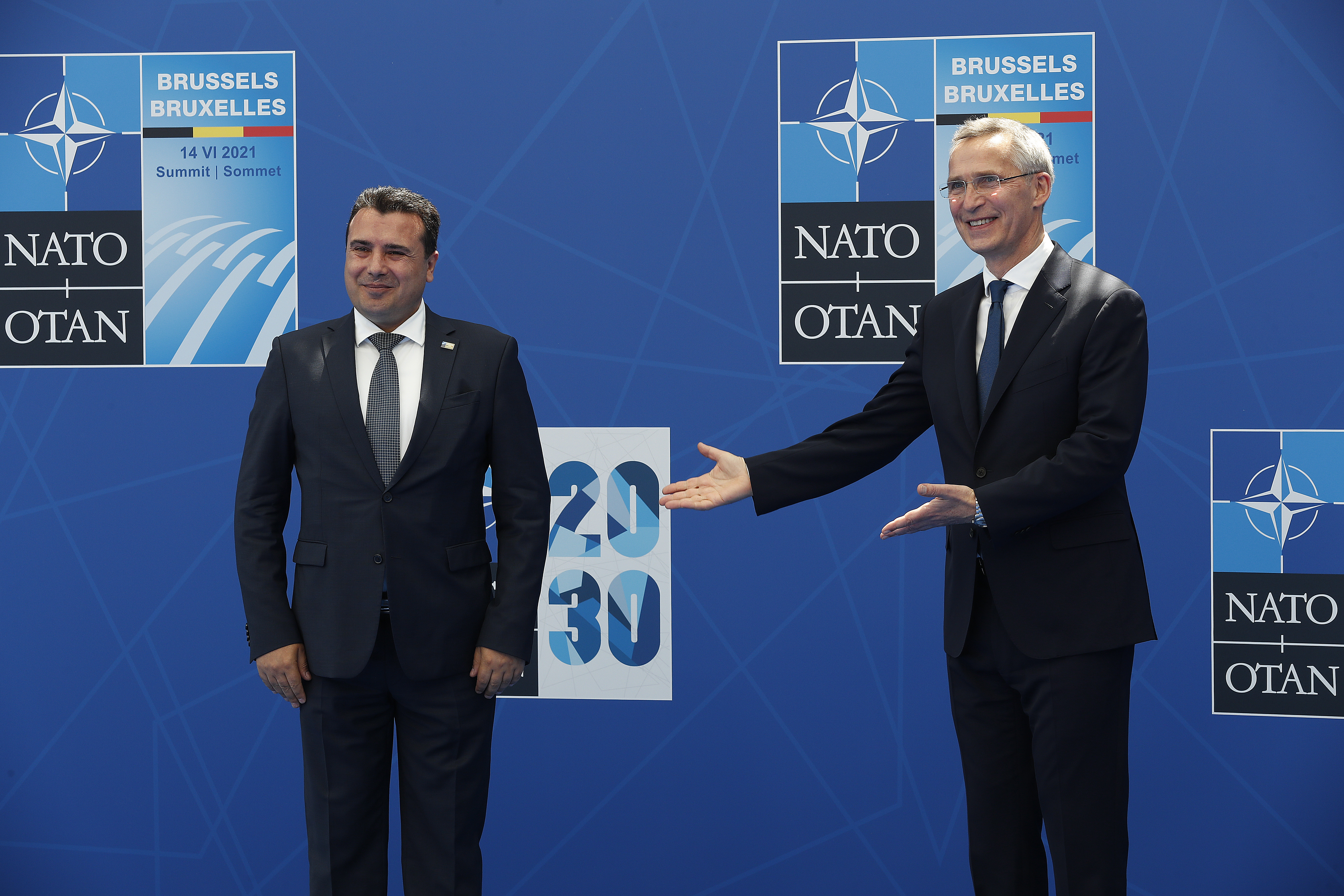
Stoltenberg with Macedonian Prime Minister Zoran Zaev during a NATO summit on 14 June 2021

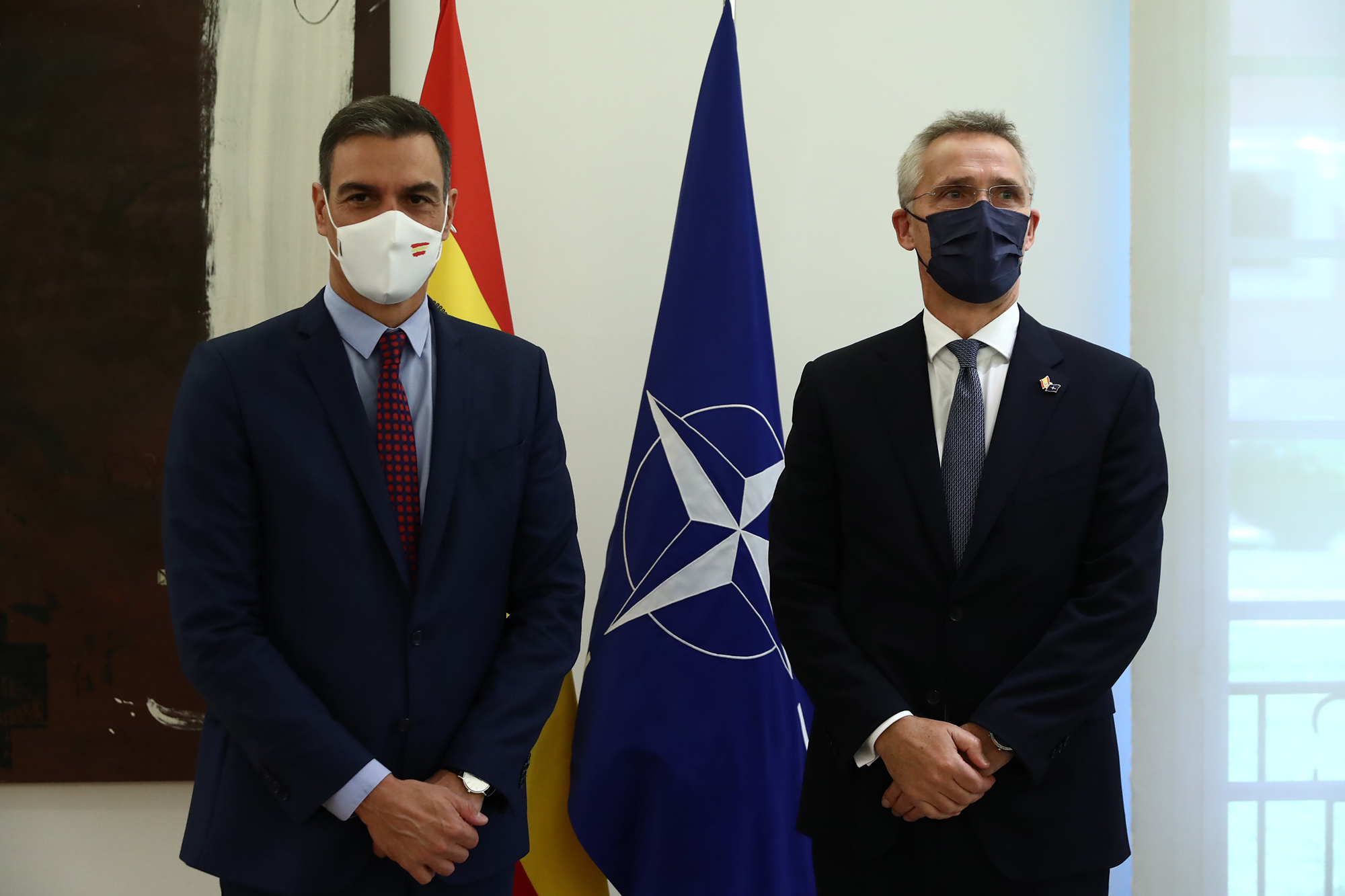
Stoltenberg and Spanish Prime Minister Pedro Sánchez in Madrid, 8 October 2021

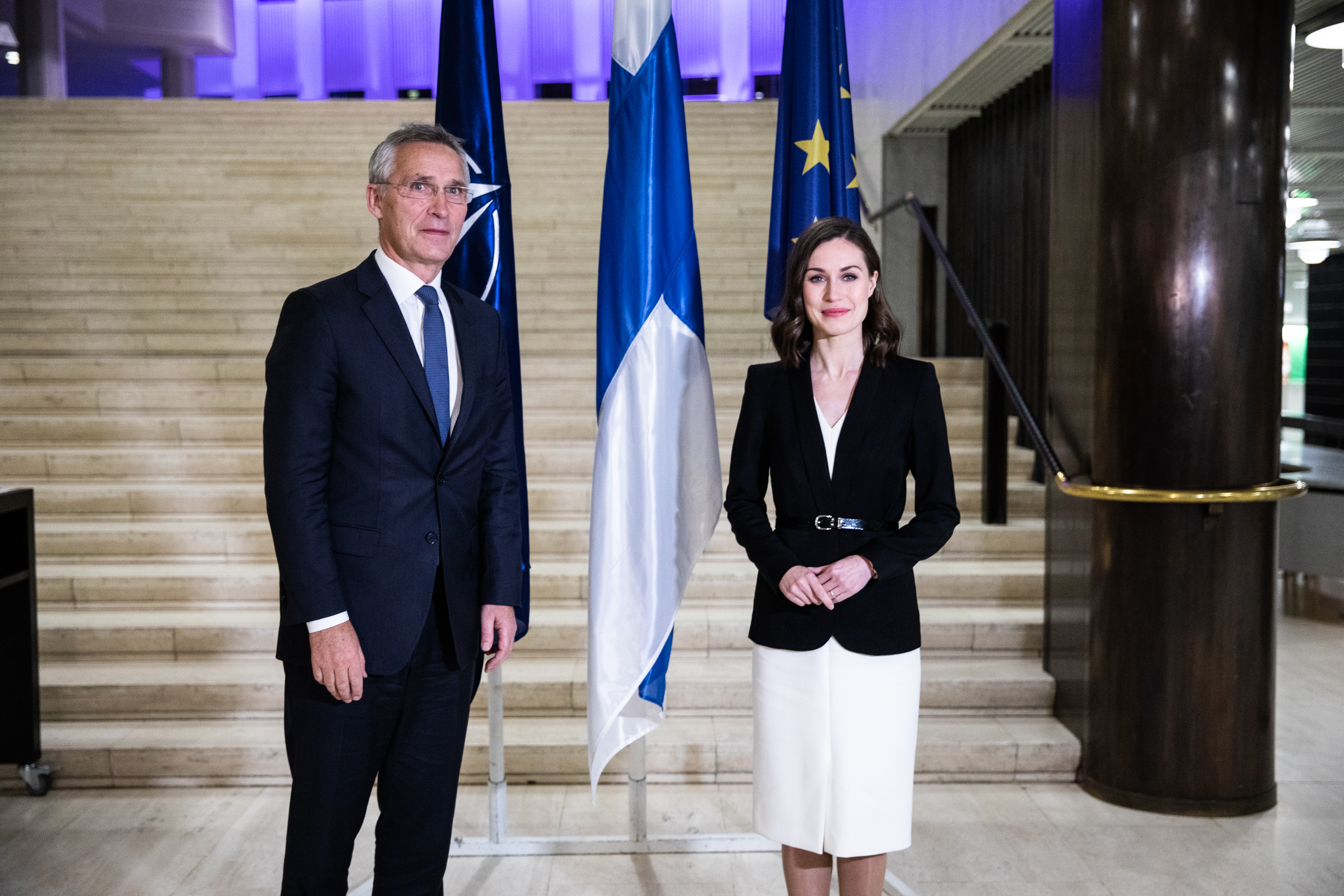
Stoltenberg and Finnish Prime Minister Sanna Marin in Helsinki, 25 October 2021

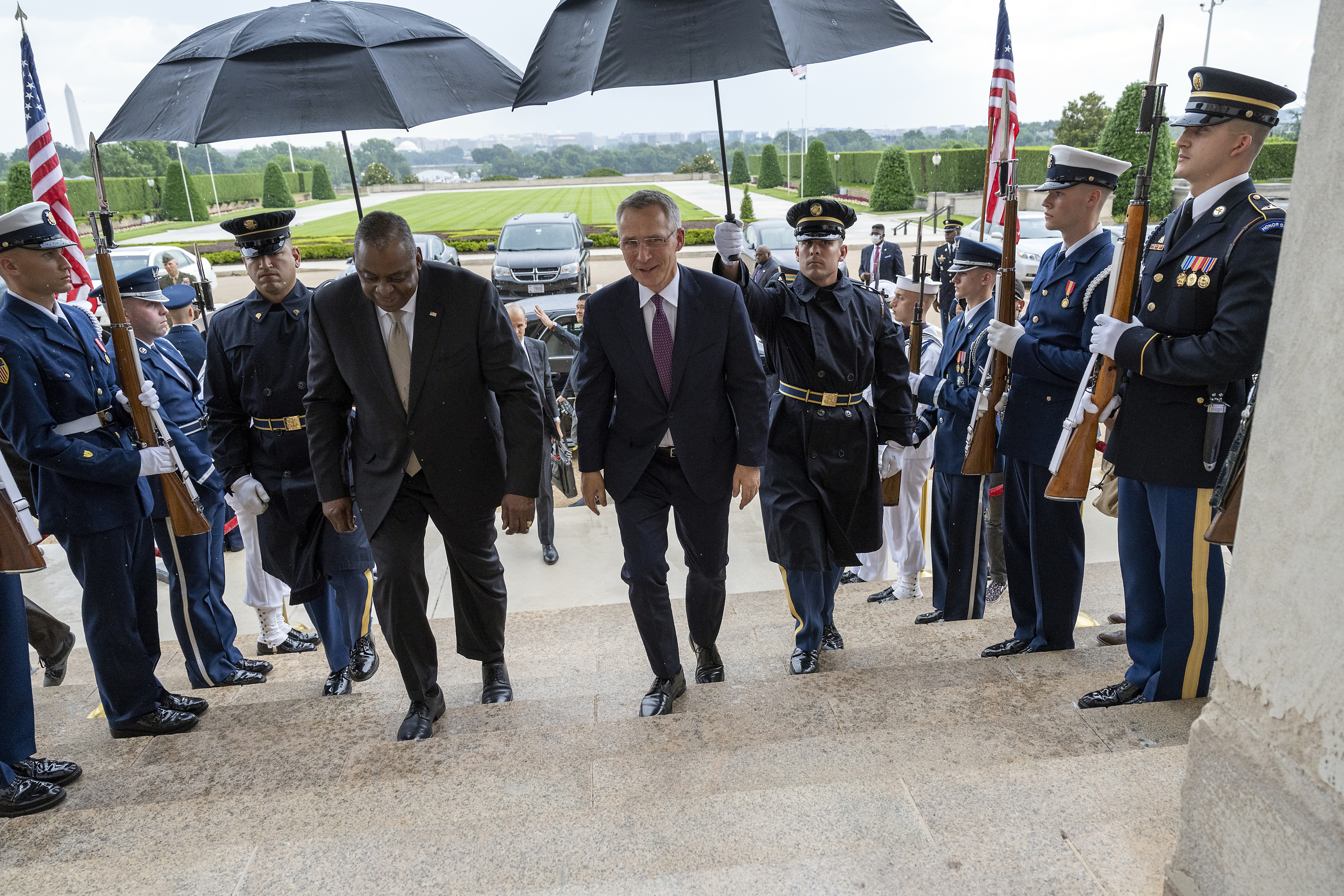
Stoltenberg and US Defense Secretary Lloyd Austin at The Pentagon on 2 June 2022

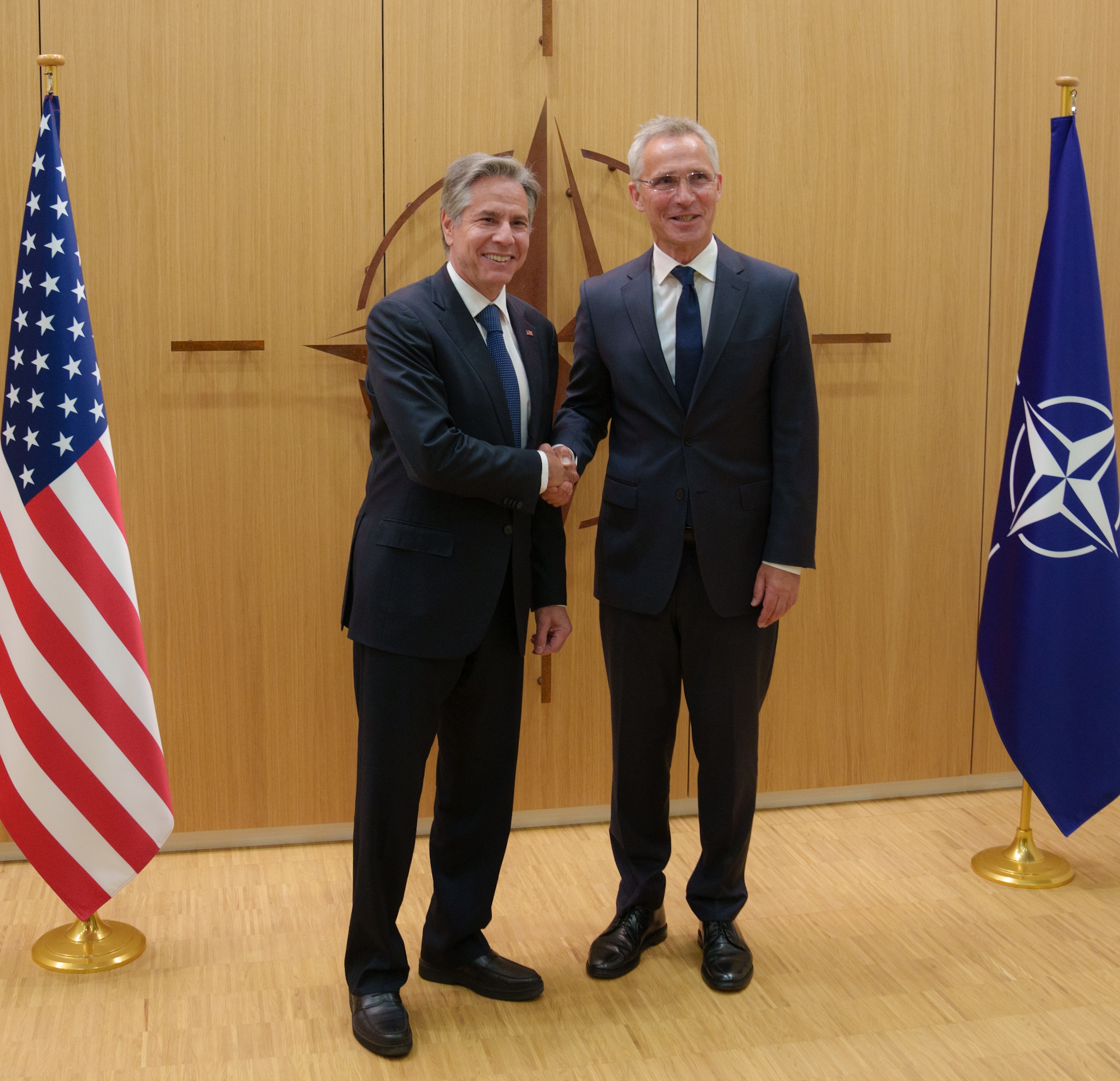
Stoltenberg and U.S. Secretary of State Antony Blinken in Brussels, 9 September 2022

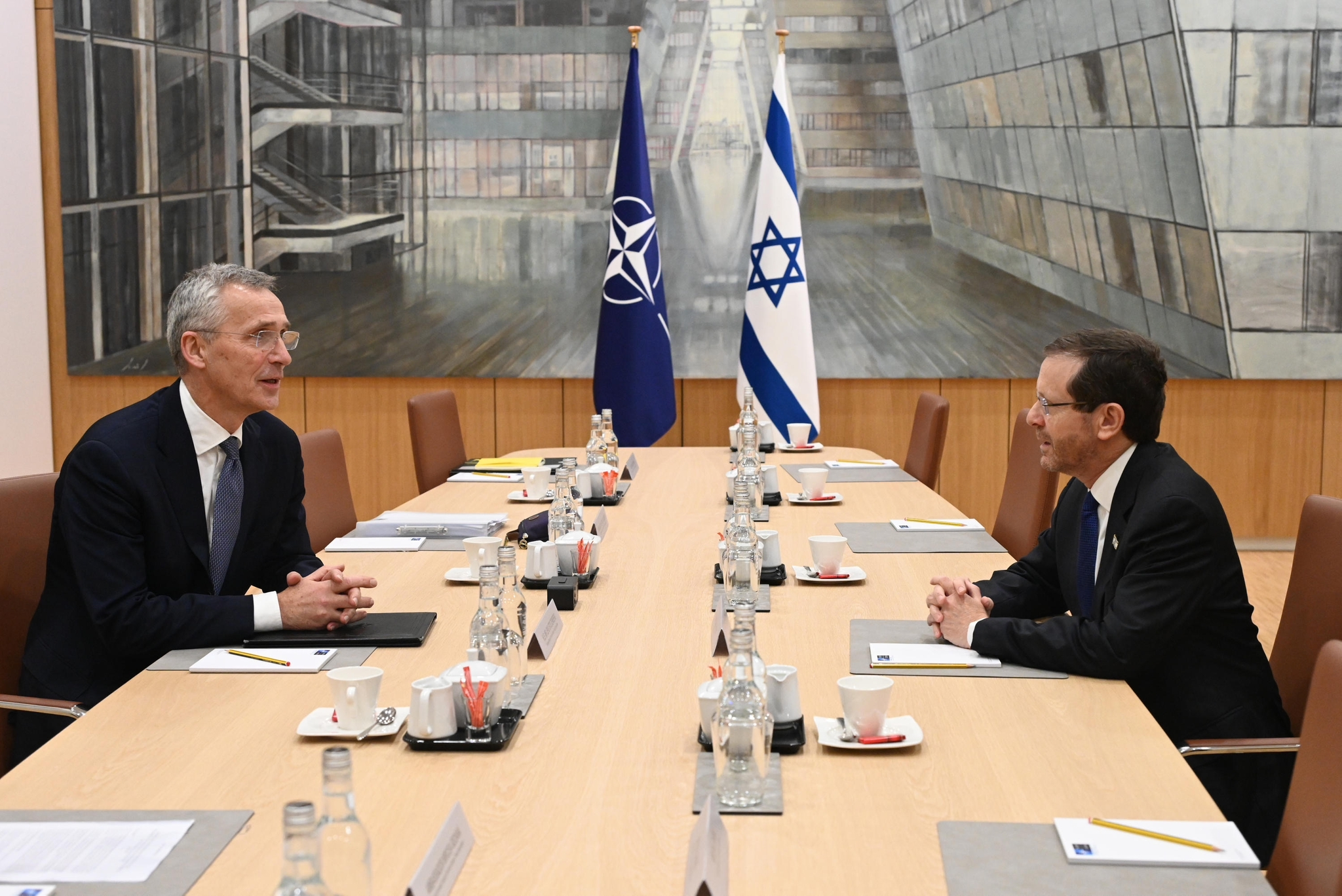
Stoltenberg and Israeli President Isaac Herzog in Brussels, 26 January 2023

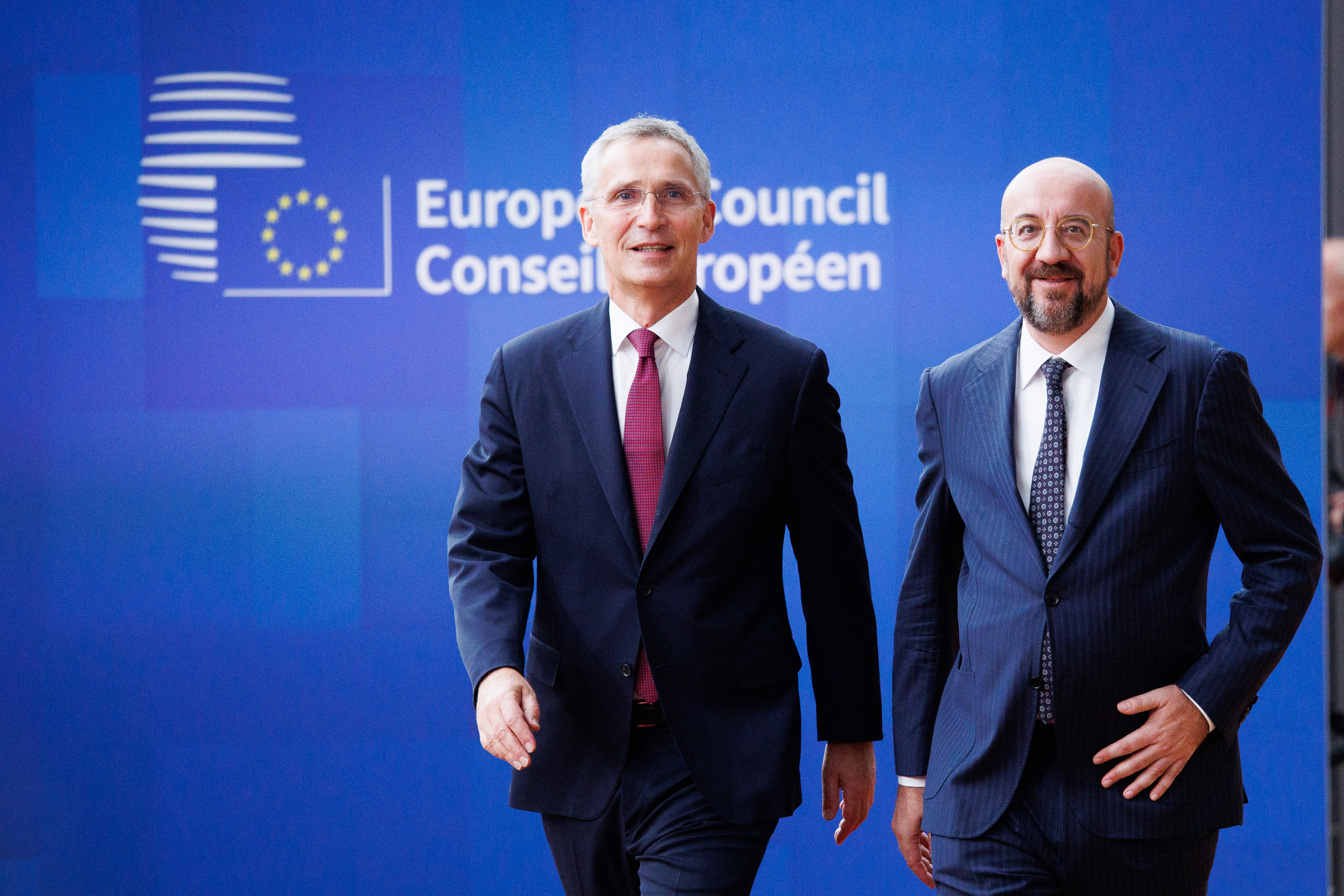
Stoltenberg and President of the European Council Charles Michel in Brussels, 29 June 2023

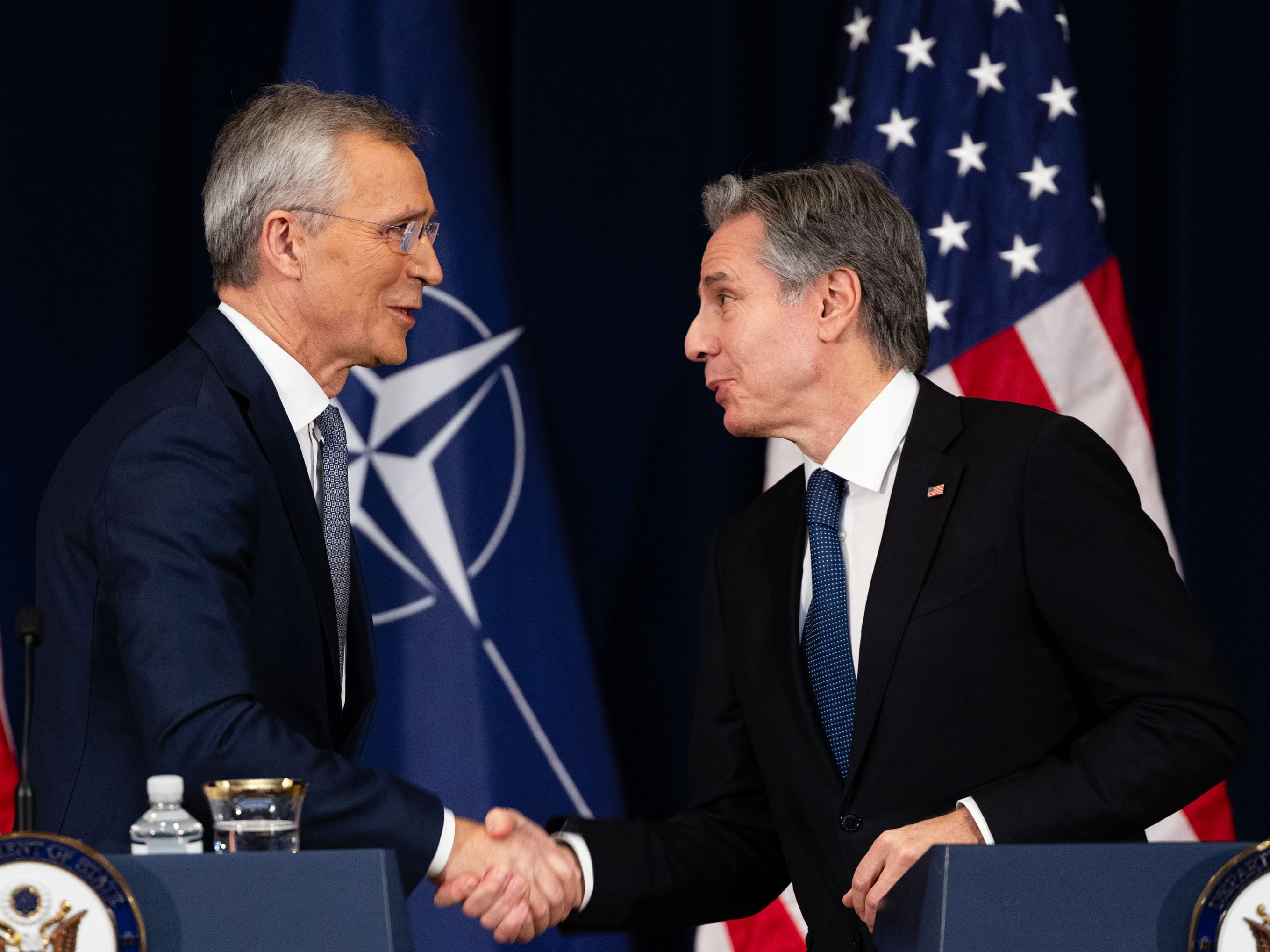
Stoltenberg with US Secretary of State Antony Blinken in Washington, D.C., 29 January 2024

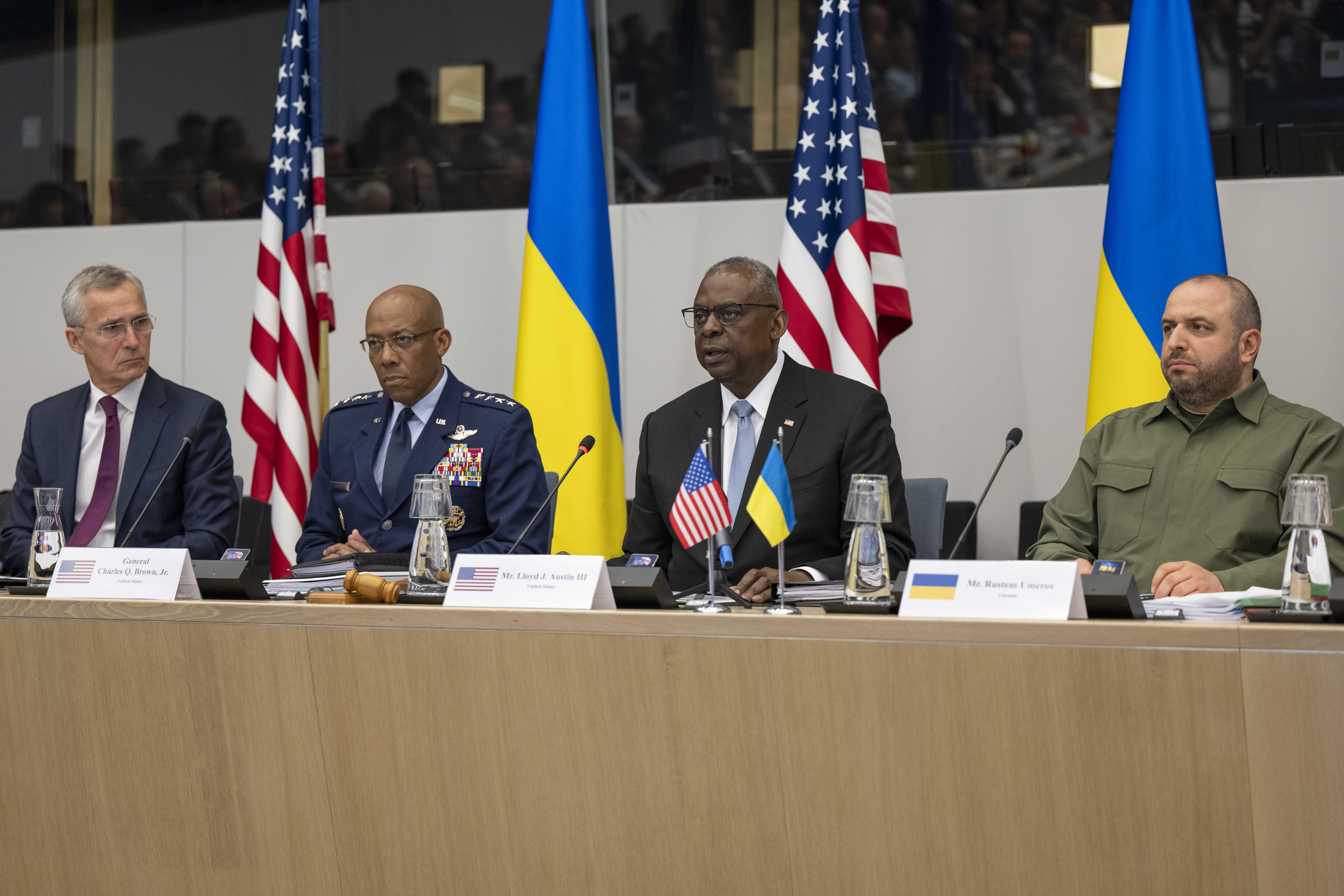
Stoltenberg at a meeting of the Ukraine Defense Contact Group at NATO Headquarters in Brussels, 13 June 2024

== In popular culture ==
=== Incognito taxi driver in Norway ===
In August 2013, Stoltenberg said on his Facebook page that he had spent an afternoon working incognito as a taxi driver in Oslo. Stoltenberg said he had wanted to "hear from real Norwegian voters" and that "taxis were one of the few places where people shared their true views." He added that, before driving the taxi, he had not driven a car in eight years. The event was videotaped in a hidden camera fashion, and released as a promotional video by the Labour party for the election campaign. It was later confirmed that 5 of the 14 customers were paid and recruited by the production company that produced the event for the Labour Party; however, none knew that they would meet Stoltenberg.

=== BBC Radio 4 – Desert Island Discs ===
On 12 July 2020 Stoltenberg was the invited guest on the long running BBC Radio 4 programme Desert Island Discs. His musical choices included "Hungry Heart", sung by Bruce Springsteen; "So Long, Marianne", by Leonard Cohen; and "No Harm", by the duo Smerz, one of whom is his daughter Catharina.

=== In other media ===
In the crime drama 22 July, which depicts the 2011 Norway attacks, he is played by actor Ola G. Furuseth.

== Controversies ==
As a youth, Stoltenberg participated in protest rallies against the U.S. war in Vietnam in the 1970s. In 2011, Stoltenberg said: "We sang the chorus, 'Singing Norway, Norway out of Nato.' It was a hit."

In 2001, Stoltenberg crashed his Labour Party (Ap) owned car into a parked car; he then left the premises without leaving a note with his name or number; the damages cost 8,000 Norwegian kroner to repair.

In 2002, Stoltenberg admitted to having used hashish (cannabis) in his youth. He therefore asked the Ministry of Justice and Public Security to evaluate his impartiality in the upcoming government response to the report on drugs by the Stoltenberg Commission, headed by his father, Thorvald Stoltenberg.

In 2011 Stoltenberg received a 380,000 kroner boat as a birthday gift from the Norwegian Labour Party (Ap) and the Norwegian Confederation of Trade Unions (LO); the Ap & LO also paid the tax for the gift, which led to criticism.

== Personal life ==
Stoltenberg is married to diplomat Ingrid Schulerud and they have two children: a son, Axel Stoltenberg (born 1989) who in 2012-13 was studying Chinese at the Shanghai Jiaotong University and daughter Anne Catharina Stoltenberg (born 1992) who is a part of pop music group Smerz.

He has one living sister, Camilla, a medical researcher and administrator who is one year older than he; and one deceased sister, Nini, four years younger, who died in 2014. Nini was a recovering heroin addict.

He prefers to spend his summer vacations at his family's cottage on the Hvaler Islands in the Oslofjord. An avid outdoorsman, he rides his bike often and during the winter season he is an active cross-country skier. In December 2011, in order to mark 100 years since Roald Amundsen reached the south pole on skis, Stoltenberg journeyed to Antarctica. He suffers from ankylosing spondylitis. Stoltenberg is also a keen video gamer specifically strategy genre games.

Although being portrayed as an atheist for most of his adult life, and declining membership in the formerly official Church of Norway, Stoltenberg has stated that he does not consider himself an atheist. He explained: "Although I am not a member of any denomination, I do believe that there is something greater than man. Some call it God, others call it something else. For me, it's about understanding that we humans are small in relation to nature, in relation to the powers that are bigger and stronger than man can ever comprehend. I find that in a church."

== See also ==
- List of heads of government that have visited the South Pole

Party political offices
Preceded by Egil Knudsen	Leader of the Workers' Youth League; 1985–1989	Succeeded by Turid Birkeland
Preceded by Thorbjørn Jagland	Leader of the Labour Party; 2002–2014	Succeeded by Jonas Gahr Støre
Political offices
Preceded by Finn Kristensen as Minister of Industry	Minister of Industry and Energy; 1993–1996	Succeeded by Grete Knudsen
Preceded by Sigbjørn Johnsen	Minister of Finance; 1996–1997	Succeeded by Gudmund Restad
Preceded by Kjell Magne Bondevik	Prime Minister of Norway; 2000–2001	Succeeded by Kjell Magne Bondevik
Preceded by Kjell Magne Bondevik	Prime Minister of Norway; 2005–2013	Succeeded by Erna Solberg
Preceded by Trygve Slagsvold Vedum	Minister of Finance; 2025–present	Incumbent
Diplomatic posts
Preceded by Anders Fogh Rasmussen	Secretary General of NATO; 2014–2024	Succeeded by Mark Rutte
