= Stoltenberg (Norwegian family) =

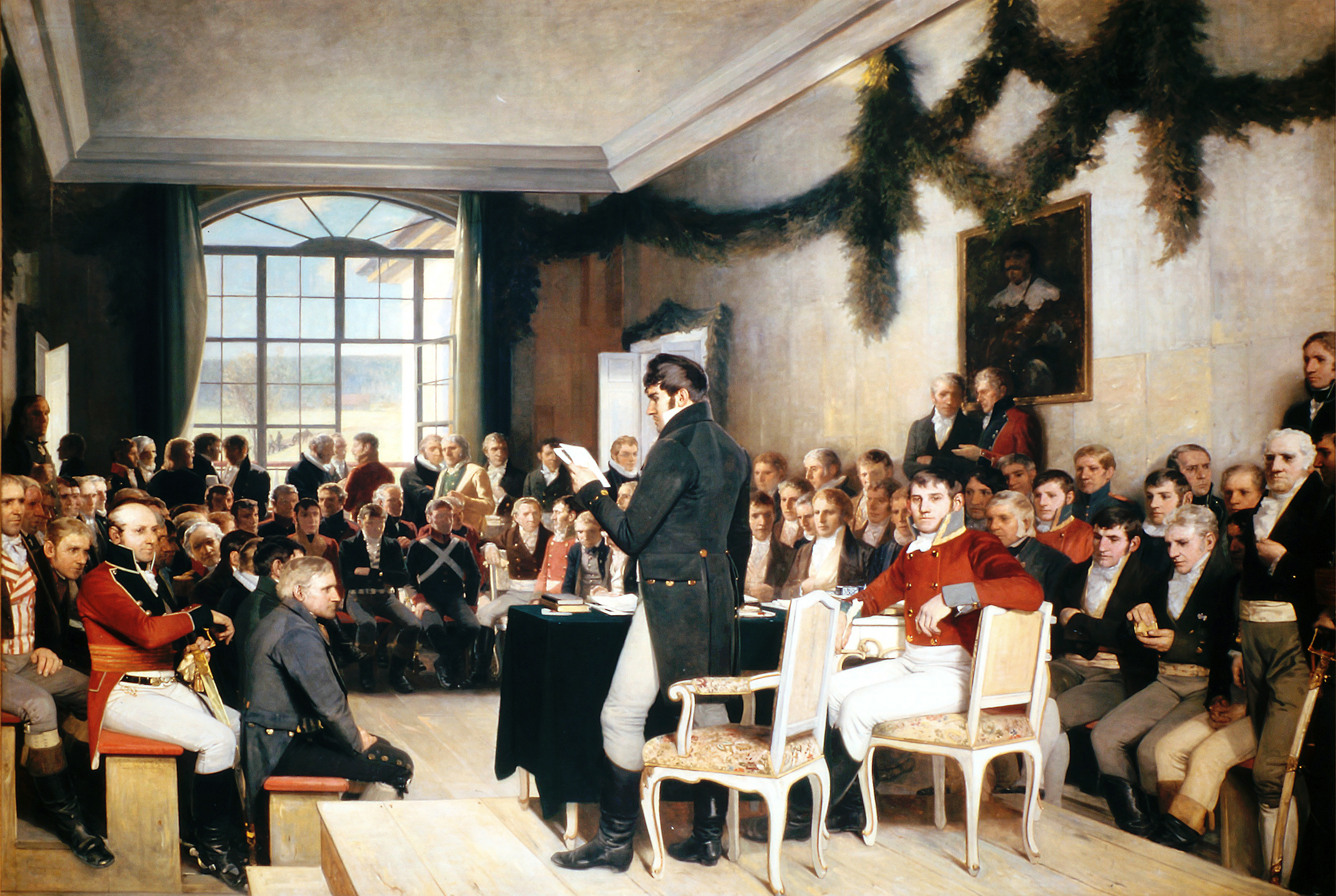
Carl Peter Stoltenberg at the Norwegian Constituent Assembly.

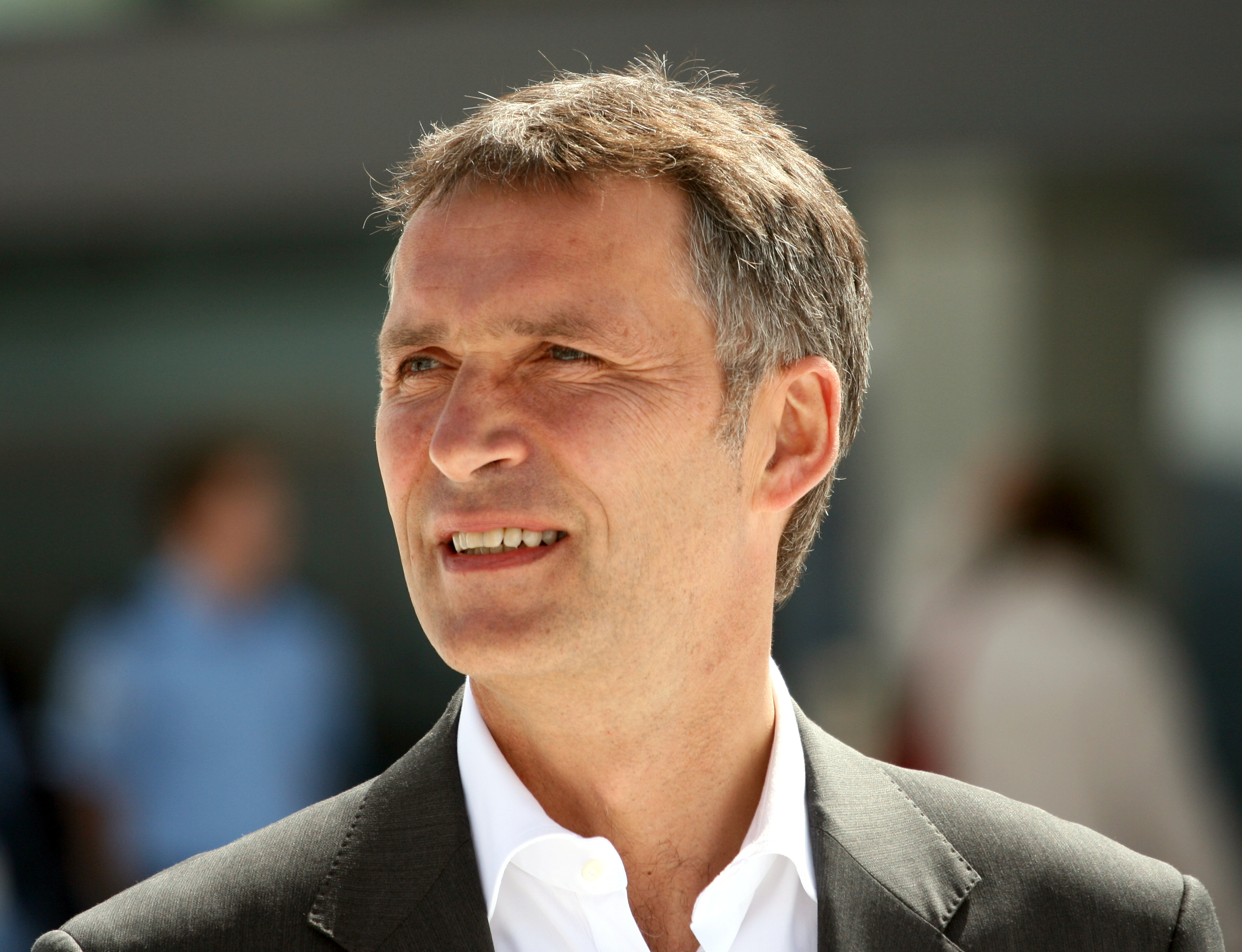
Jens Stoltenberg, Secretary General of NATO.

Stoltenberg is a Norwegian family known for its politicians, including two previous government ministers, Minister of Foreign Affairs Thorvald Stoltenberg and Prime Minister Jens Stoltenberg, the latter of whom served as Secretary General of NATO until October 2024.

Various branches of the family have long political traditions. The family may be traced back to Henrich Mogenssen Stoltenberg (fl. around 1590), who was a churchwarden in Tønsberg. Henrich Mogenssen was the great-grandfather of Vincent Stoltenberg (1694-1763) and Jens Stoltenberg (1676-1725), a merchant and a priest, respectively.

The name Stoltenberg derives from the village Stoltenberg in Germany.

== Prominent members ==
- Carl Peter Stoltenberg (1770–1830), participant at the Norwegian Constituent Assembly
- Camilla Stoltenberg (born 1958), physician and researcher
- Jens Stoltenberg (born 1959), former Prime Minister of Norway and Secretary General of NATO.
- Karin Stoltenberg (1931–2012; née Heiberg), former State Secretary
- Mathias Stoltenberg (1799–1871), painter
- Nini Stoltenberg (1963–2014), noted recreational drug user and television personality
- Robert Stoltenberg (born 1965), comedian
- Thorvald Stoltenberg (1931–2018), former Foreign Minister, Defense Minister and President of the Norwegian Red Cross
- Catharina Stoltenberg (born 1992), part of electronic music duo Smerz
