= Stoltenberg (surname) =

Stoltenberg is a German surname. Notable people with the surname include:

- Gerhard Stoltenberg (1928–2001), German politician and prime minister of Schleswig-Holstein
- Thorvald Stoltenberg (1931–2018), Norwegian diplomat and cabinet member
- Jens Stoltenberg (born 1959), Norwegian politician
- Donald Stoltenberg (1927–2016), American artist, author and teacher
- John Stoltenberg (born 1944), American radical feminist activist and writer
- Jason Stoltenberg (born 1970), Australian tennis player
- Kristin Stoltenberg (born 1969), Norwegian newspaper editor and media executive
- Robert Stoltenberg (born 1965), Norwegian comedian

== See also ==
- Stoltenberg (Norwegian family)
