= Ove Guldberg =

Danish engineer and politician (1918–2008)

Minister of Foreign Affairs
- In office 19 December 1973 – 13 February 1975
- Prime Minister: Poul Hartling
- Preceded by: K. B. Andersen
- Succeeded by: K. B. Andersen

Minister of Public Works
- In office 2 February 1968 – 11 October 1971
- Prime Minister: Hilmar Baunsgaard
- Preceded by: Svend Horn
- Succeeded by: Jens Kampmann

Personal details
- Born: 2 December 1918 Nysted, Denmark
- Died: 28 February 2008 (aged 89) Nexø, Denmark
- Party: Venstre
- Spouse: Else Guldberg
- Profession: Engineer

Ove Guldberg (2 December 1918 – 28 February 2008) was a Danish engineer, businessman and politician from Venstre who served as the minister of public works from 1968 to 1971 and minister of foreign affairs from 1973 to 1975.

== Early life and education ==
Guldberg was born in Nysted on 2 December 1918. His father was a jurist. He received an engineering degree in 1942 and obtained a candidate of law degree in 1949.

== Career ==
Guldberg was the director of the Danish Engineering Association in the period 1952–1965 and of the Association of Consulting Engineers from 1965 to 1968. Between 1957 and 1968 he was also the director of a company owned by the Danish Engineering Association. In 1964 he joined the liberal party Venstre and won a seat at the Folketing where he served until 1977. He was the minister of public works in the cabinet of Prime Minister Hilmar Baunsgaard from 1968 to 1971. (Note: The Ministry of Public Works was later integrated into the Ministry of Transport.) Between December 1973 and February 1975 Guldberg was the foreign minister in the cabinet led by Poul Hartling. From 1973 to 1977 he was a member of the European Parliament.

== Personal life and death ==
Guldberg married and had children, one of whom was a diplomat. Following his retirement from politics he and his wife, Else, lived in Spain and Ireland. They moved to Nexø in January 2003. His wife died there in September 2005, and he also died there on 28 February 2008.
