= Jon Sudbø =

Norwegian dentist, physician, and former medical researcher

- Born: 3 May 1961 (age 65)
- Occupations: Dentist and physician
- Known for: Scientific fraud

Jon Sudbø (born 3 May 1961) is a Norwegian dentist, physician, and former medical researcher, who was exposed as a scientific fraudster in 2006. Over a period of several years, he fabricated results in the field of oncology which he published in leading medical journals. The article that led to his downfall, which was published in The Lancet, was based on 900 patients Sudbø had fabricated entirely. The editor of The Lancet described this as the biggest scientific fraud conducted by a single researcher ever.

== Biography ==
Sudbø graduated from the University of Oslo faculty of dentistry in 1989 and the faculty of medicine in 1994, both at the top of his class.

Sudbø was formerly employed as a consultant oncologist at the Radium Hospital in Oslo and as an associate professor at the University of Oslo, but as a result of the fabrication scandal, he resigned from these positions in 2006. The same year, his licenses to practice medicine and dentistry were revoked. An inquiry by the Faculty of Medicine at the University of Oslo found that most of Sudbø's work, including his doctoral dissertation, was based on fraud, and the University of Oslo revoked his doctorate in medicine in 2006.

In 2007, he was granted a strictly limited license to work as an assistant dentist under supervision, and in 2009, he regained licenses to practice medicine and dentistry with some restrictions. He is currently working as an assistant dentist in Seljord Municipality, Telemark.

His wife, Wanja Kildal was his co-author of 7 of the articles that were found to be fraudulent and subsequently retracted, while his twin brother Asle Sudbø was a co-author of two of these articles.

== Scandal ==
In January 2006 it was revealed that his October 2005 fast track submission to The Lancet was based upon fraudulent patient data. The article had suggested that non-COX2-NSAIDs like ibuprofen diminish the risk of oral cancer in smokers. However, it turned out that the whole patient material was fictional. The leader of the epidemiology division at Norwegian Institute of Public Health, Camilla Stoltenberg, found the article suspicious at the end of 2005 because the data was supposedly from a cancer patient database which had not yet opened. The Norwegian newspaper Dagbladet reported that of the 908 subjects in the Lancet study 250 had the same birthday.

Sudbø has later acknowledged that he has used fictional data in at least two more papers, published in the New England Journal of Medicine and the Journal of Clinical Oncology.

An independent Commission of Inquiry led by Swedish Professor Anders Ekbom, that also included a member from the U.S. National Cancer Institute, was set up by Rikshospitalet and the University of Oslo to discern the details of the fraud. They were also to try to identify the role of the co-authors, which included, among others, Jon Sudbø's brother, Asle Sudbø, and wife.

In May 2006, Norwegian and Swedish media reported that the committee was investigating some 60 scientists from 6 countries, and a total of 38 articles.

The commission reported on 30 June 2006. The commission deemed much of Sudbø's work invalid because of manipulation and fabrication of raw data: of the 38 articles he had published since 1993, 15 were condemned as fraudulent, including his doctoral dissertation. Because of this, the dissertation and the other fraudulent articles will be rescinded. The commission also criticised the co-authors of Sudbø's papers. Professor Anders Ekbom, the Chair of the Commission, said: "One explanation of this catastrophe was that Sudbø was a lone wolf. Few or anyone had insight into his work". The commission found no evidence that any of his co-authors had taken part in the fraud or otherwise been party to the deceit, although Sudbø's supervisor accepted criticism for lack of vigilance and follow-up.

In November 2006 his authorizations as a physician and a dentist were revoked by the Norwegian Board of Health Supervision, but in 2007 he was granted a strictly limited authorization to work as an assistant dentist. In 2009 he was granted restricted authorizations to practice as dentist and as a physician, however he cannot involve himself in research.

== Effects of fraud ==
Rikshospitalet and the University were both criticized for "a lack of preliminary control and organization with a view to the researcher's [Sudbø's] PhD project". The hospital was also criticized for "a lack of training and consciousness-raising in respect of the researcher and other employees with a view to the rules for handling patient material, preliminary assessments of research projects and authorship" and for "a lack of leadership and routines designed to expose and deal with non-conformance with its rules of procedure".

The fraud may also have had international effects. The commission could not rule out that Sudbø's false conclusions could have affected cancer patients around the world, because his findings were used by other scientists and incorporated into cancer treatments, although Sudbø's solicitor Erling O. Lyngtveit had said on behalf of his client that none of the fraudulent articles had had any consequences for patients. Norway's scientific reputation could also be damaged by the affair, and "massive lawsuits" may be imminent from the national and international organisations that funded Sudbø's fraudulent papers.

According to the Norwegian news website Depesjer ("Dispatches"), scientific experts they consulted felt that Sudbø's co-authors were "severely exploited", but also that closer observations of the Vancouver guidelines and other rules by co-authors would "hamper future attempts at publishing fabricated material". Dr. Atle Klovning, a leading European authority on evidence-based medicine, said in the article that Sudbø's co-authors had probably not lived up to their responsibilities according to the Vancouver rules.

== Publications ==
- Sudbø J. 2001. Predictive markers in oral premalignancies and early stage carcinomas. Oslo : Department of Pathology, The Norwegian Radium Hospital. ISBN 82-7633-163-7. Doctoral dissertation, University of Oslo.
  - Retracted by the university in December 2006

=== Retracted papers ===
- Sudbø J, Lee JJ, Lippman SM, Mork J, Sagen S, Flatner N, Ristimäki A, Sudbø A, Mao L, Zhou X, Kildal W, Evensen JF, Reith A, Dannenberg AJ. Non-steroidal anti-inflammatory drugs and the risk of oral cancer: a nested case-control study. Lancet. 2005 Oct 15-21;366(9494):1359-66.
  - Retraction: Horton R. Lancet. 2006 Feb 4;367(9508):382.
- Sudbø J. Novel management of oral cancer: a paradigm of predictive oncology. Clin Med Res. 2004 Nov;2(4):233-42. Review.
  - Retraction: Reed KD, Salzman-Scott SA. Clin Med Res. 2007 Oct;5(3):203.
- Sudbø J, Samuelsson R, Risberg B, Heistein S, Nyhus C, Samuelsson M, Puntervold R, Sigstad E, Davidson B, Reith A, Berner A. Risk markers of oral cancer in clinically normal mucosa as an aid in smoking cessation counseling. J Clin Oncol. 2005 Mar 20;23(9):1927-33.
  - Retraction: J Clin Oncol. 2006 Dec 10;24(35):5621.
- Sudbø J, Lippman SM, Lee JJ, Mao L, Kildal W, Sudbø A, Sagen S, Bryne M, El-Naggar A, Risberg B, Evensen JF, Reith A. The influence of resection and aneuploidy on mortality in oral leukoplakia. N Engl J Med. 2004 Apr 1;350(14):1405-13.
  - Retraction: Curfman GD, Morrissey S, Drazen JM. N Engl J Med. 2006 Nov 2;355(18):1927.
- Sudbø J, Bryne M, Mao L, Lotan R, Reith A, Kildal W, Davidson B, Søland TM, Lippman SM. Molecular based treatment of oral cancer. Oral Oncol. 2003 Dec;39(8):749-58. Review.
  - Retraction: Oral Oncol. 2007 Apr;43(4):421.
- Sudbø J. [Chemoprevention of oral cancer]. Tidsskr Nor Laegeforen. 2003 May 29;123(11):1518-21. Review.
  - Retraction: Haug C. Tidsskr Nor Laegeforen. 2006 Sep 7;126(17):2287.
- Sudbø J, Ristimäki A, Sondresen JE, Kildal W, Boysen M, Koppang HS, Reith A, Risberg B, Nesland JM, Bryne M. Cyclooxygenase-2 (COX-2) expression in high-risk premalignant oral lesions. Oral Oncol. 2003 Jul;39(5):497-505.
  - Retraction: Oral Oncol. 2007 Apr;43(4):420.
- Sudbø J, Reith A. When is an oral leukoplakia premalignant? Oral Oncol. 2002 Dec;38(8):813-4.
  - Retraction: Oral Oncol. 2007 Apr;43(4):419.
- Sudbø J, Warloe T, Aamdal S, Reith A, Bryne M. [Diagnosis and treatment of oral precancerous lesions]. Tidsskr Nor Laegeforen. 2001 Oct 30;121(26):3066-71.
  - Retraction: Warloe T, Aamdal S, Reith A, Bryne M. Tidsskr Nor Laegeforen. 2006 Sep 7;126(17):2287.
- Sudbø J, Ried T, Bryne M, Kildal W, Danielsen H, Reith A. Abnormal DNA content predicts the occurrence of carcinomas in non-dysplastic oral white patches. Oral Oncol. 2001 Oct;37(7):558-65.
  - Retraction: Oral Oncol. 2007 Apr;43(4):418.
- Sudbø J, Bryne M, Johannessen AC, Kildal W, Danielsen HE, Reith A. Comparison of histological grading and large-scale genomic status (DNA ploidy) as prognostic tools in oral dysplasia. J Pathol. 2001 Jul;194(3):303-10.
  - Retraction: J Pathol. 2007 Jan;211(1):109.
- Sudbø J, Kildal W, Risberg B, Koppang HS, Danielsen HE, Reith A. DNA content as a prognostic marker in patients with oral leukoplakia. N Engl J Med. 2001 Apr 26;344(17):1270-8.
  - Retraction: Curfman GD, Morrissey S, Drazen JM. N Engl J Med. 2006 Nov 2;355(18):1927.

== See also ==
- Scientific misconduct, including a list of alleged science scandals.
- List of scientific misconduct incidents
