= Hans Ødegaard =

Norwegian painter (1876–1943)

Hans Ødegaard (30 May 1876 – 1 March 1943) was a Norwegian painter.

== Biography ==
He was born in Norderhov. He studied painting and drawing with Brynjulf Bergslien. He was a student of Fredrik Kolstø the year 1897-1898 and Knud Bergslien the year 1898–1899. Later in Copenhagen under Peder Severin Krøyer in the year 1899–1900. He was a student of Kristian Zahrtmann at Copenhagen in February 1900. He trained under Johan Nordhagen from 1900 to 1905 and was a pupil of Erik Werenskiold from 1902 to 1903. He was also a student of Harriet Backer.

His debut was at the Høstutstillingen in Oslo during 1898. Among his paintings at the National Gallery of Norway are Skraphandel i Vaterland from 1903, and Fra Tvedestrand from 1919. He was responsible for the presentation of elder Norwegian art at the 1914 Jubilee Exhibition at Frogner in Kristiania. The presentation of painters such as Lars Hertervig, Mathias Stoltenberg, Peder Balke and Johannes Flintoe gave these artists a more prominent position in the history of Norwegian art.
