= Jørgensen Cabinet =

The Jørgensen Cabinet can refer to five Danish cabinets headed by Danish Prime minister Anker Jørgensen:

- The Jørgensen I Cabinet (5 October 1972 - 19 December 1973)
- The Jørgensen II Cabinet (13 February 1975 - 30 August 1978)
- The Jørgensen III Cabinet (30 August 1978 - 26 October 1979)
- The Jørgensen IV Cabinet (26 October 1979 - 30 December 1981)
- The Jørgensen V Cabinet(30 December 1981 - 10 September 1982)
