= Nini Stoltenberg =

Norwegian television personality

- Born: 11 February 1963; Oslo, Norway
- Died: 27 July 2014 (aged 51)
- Occupation: Television personality
- Spouse: Karl John Sivertzen
- Family: Thorvald Stoltenberg (father); Karin Stoltenberg (mother); Jens (brother); Camilla (sister)

Nini Stoltenberg (11 February 1963 – 27 July 2014) was a Norwegian television personality and sister of Jens Stoltenberg, former prime minister of Norway, and Camilla Stoltenberg, the director-general of the Norwegian Institute of Public Health. She was, however, better known as a drug addict, and has been cited as such by Norwegian media on numerous occasions. She has often been depicted as an unofficial spokesperson for Norwegian drug users. Stoltenberg was part of a 12-member group of expert advisers on drug policies for the second cabinet Bondevik (2001–2005).

Stoltenberg presented a harsh critique of Norwegian illegal drug politics and questioned whether the expert group of which she was a member really made any difference. During the period when she served on the government advisory panel, Stoltenberg made headlines when she advocated the legalization of cannabis.

== Early life ==
Nini Stoltenberg grew up in Oslo as the youngest of three siblings. Her brother is Jens Stoltenberg (b. 1959), former prime minister of Norway, and her sister is Camilla Stoltenberg (b. 1957), a medical researcher and administrator. Her parents are Thorvald Stoltenberg, former foreign minister of Norway and Karin Stoltenberg, a geneticist who has served, among other prominent positions, as state secretary.

Stoltenberg studied law. A 1995 biography of her father described the Stoltenberg family as a particularly tightknit family, known for its hospitality and openness, where the three children and their many friends set the tone.

In the 1995 biography about her father, Nini Stoltenberg is described as the black sheep of the family. At the age of 15, she went to Christiania in Denmark, a self-governed zone known for its liberal drug policies, where she remained for several months.

At the age of 17, Stoltenberg attended a Bruce Springsteen concert, was pulled up on stage and danced together with the rock superstar.

== Television career ==
Stoltenberg started out doing television work in 1992 when she co-hosted the TV3 show På tide with Ole Paus. In 1994, she co-hosted Kvinnene på taket ("The Women On The Rooftop") together with Åsa Rytter Evensen and Anne Lise Hammer. Concurrently, she worked on the youth program U on NRK, where she also received production training. Stoltenberg was producer for the 1993 talk show Argus with high-profile lawyer Mona Høiness. Following her 2001 appearance on Rikets tilstand, she was offered a job with TV 2, Norway's second-largest broadcaster. She made a short appearance, as herself, in an episode of the comedy television series Uti vår hage, shown on Norwegian television in March 2008. In 2008, she appeared on Manshow, a talk show hosted by Håvard Lilleheie.

== Intravenous drug use ==
Stoltenberg's drug addiction became known to the Norwegian public in October 2001, one week after her brother had resigned from his first cabinet. The revelation came when she spoke about it in the current affairs television program, Rikets tilstand, which broke previous records for number of viewers. Following the program in which she appeared together with her father, Thorvald Stoltenberg, she received more than 2,000 letters of support from viewers who in one way or another had experienced the problems associated with illegal drug abuse. Thorvald Stoltenberg has described his experiences with having a child who was an intravenous drug user in his 2001 memoirs, Det handler om mennesker ("It's about people")–one day being immersed in peace negotiations in the Balkans, the next wandering the streets of Oslo trying to find Nini.

In 2007, Stoltenberg went into more detail about how she started out as a drug addict, to TV journalist Tonje Steinsland–the second time her life as an addict was the subject of a television special. It started in 1991, when she was 27. She witnessed two drug addicts in a fight in a café in Oslo when something fell out of the pocket of one of them. She picked it up and saw that it was heroin. Together with her boyfriend, she went home and decided to snort the drug. For the next three years, she was an intravenous drug user. By the end of the 1990s, she was close to dying. In the interview, Stoltenberg also tells of a boyfriend who subjected her to punishments, psychological terror and much fear, however, the heroin turned all of that into a feeling of freedom and made her perceive their relationship as simply wonderful, for a while.

Stoltenberg received opioid agonist treatment using methadone for her heroin addiction during a two-year period.

Stoltenberg and her partner did not give up on drugs altogether. At one point, they asserted that they no longer had an addiction problem and that they "have an ok life, and sometimes drugs enter into our life".

== Perspectives on reasons behind recreational drug use ==
Stoltenberg refuted the notion that she started using drugs because she could not deal with the pressure of having such successful siblings. Had it not been for the many problems of her relationship at the time, she said, she would not have turned to drugs for an escape.

Professionals and experts seem to prefer the tragic explanation of why some choose drugs to get by more effortlessly in life. Tragic upbringing and sexual abuse, spiced with an alcoholized home, are "popular" explanations. (. . .) What I miss are all those who have in fact used and are using drugs because it feels good – so good that you do not want to stop even though you can see with open eyes that you are playing Russian roulette with everything and everybody that are close. Family, sweetheart, children. Yes, even life. (. . .) The reasons why people start to use drugs are plentifold. You encounter drug users in all social classes and segments of the population. But if there exists a common denominator, that would have to be the desire for a "recess". Recess from what? Well, that varies from one individual to the next. It is really a matter of drug users being as diverse as the rest of the population.

— Stoltenberg, Nini; Sivertzen, Karl John (10 May 2006). "Rapport fra en eksperts liv" (PDF). Samtiden (in Norwegian). Oslo, Norway.

Stoltenberg acknowledged that it is not uncommon among drug users to resent her relativistic perspective on drug use and rehabilitation.

== Personal life ==
Stoltenberg had a long-time relationship with Karl John Sivertzen (1951–2013) from Odda, a former drug addict who was convicted of an armed bank robbery in the 1970s (he was released in 1983), and whose past Stoltenberg described as a "virtual crime novel". They were invited together for Christmas dinner at her parents' house where her brother, as prime minister, attended. Together, they wrote about the conditions for drug users in Norway.

Stoltenberg and Sivertzen first met when she was admitted for detox and he was a therapist, and they became a couple 10 years later, after they met again at the home of a common acquaintance.

Stoltenberg died on 27 July 2014 after a long term illness. In 2018, her childhood friend Lars Lillo-Stenberg published a biography of Nini Stoltenberg, at the instigation of her father, Thorvald Stoltenberg.

== See also ==
- Stoltenberg (Norwegian family)
- Responsible drug use
- Drug policy reform
- Emmasofia
