= Psynapse =

Psynapse may refer to:

- Psynapse (organization), a non-profit organization in Norway, previously called Emmasofia
- Psynapse (comics), fictional Marvel Comics villain

== See also ==
- Synapse (disambiguation)
