= Kjølaas =

Kjølaas is a surname. Notable people with the surname include:

- Per Oskar Kjølaas (born 1948), Norwegian bishop of the Diocese of Nord-Hålogaland in the Church of Norway
- Gerd Kjølaas (1909–2000), Norwegian ballet dancer and choreographer
