= Asle Sudbø =

Norwegian physicist

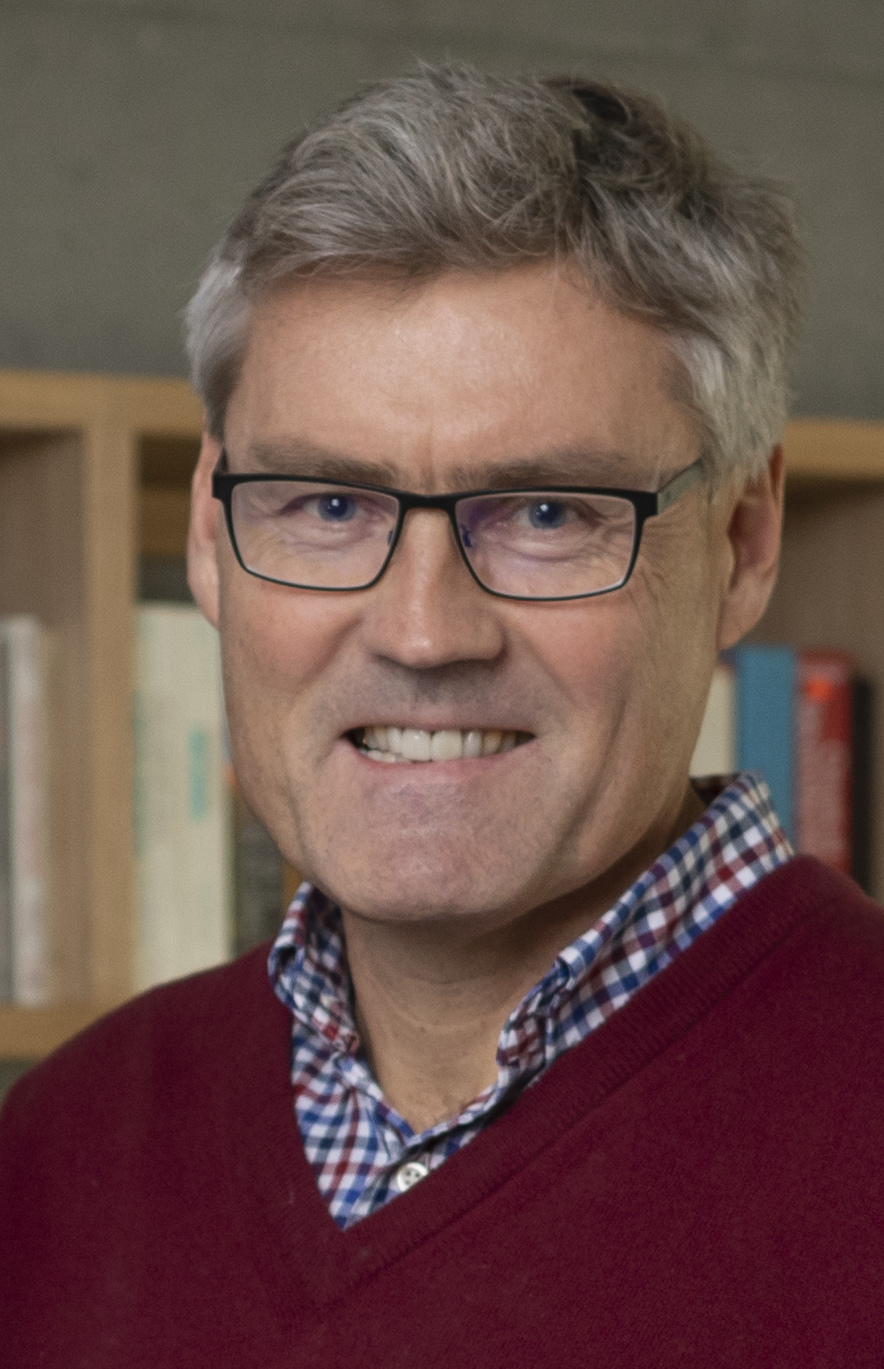
- Born: 3 May 1961 (age 65)
- Occupation: Professor of Physics
- Known for: Involvement in the Jon Sudbø research fabrication scandal

Asle Sudbø (born 3 May 1961) is a Professor of Physics at the Norwegian University of Science and Technology (NTNU). He was a co-author (with his twin brother, Jon Sudbø, and his brother's wife, Wanja Kildal) of two articles in The Lancet and The New England Journal of Medicine that were since found to be based on scientific fraud and subsequently retracted in 2006. The editor of The Lancet described this as the biggest scientific fraud conducted by a single researcher ever. However, his brother finally accepted all responsibilities and claimed only he was responsible for the fraud. An official inquiry into Asle Sudbø's involvement with his brother's fabrication took place. The official commission concluded that Jon Sudbø alone was responsible, and allegations against Asle Sudbø were proven to be unfounded.

In 2005, he was awarded the Møbius Prize from Research Council of Norway for his research on superconductivity. He is one of four principal investigators that constitute the management of the Center for Quantum Spintronics (QuSpin), a Norwegian research center and Center of excellence. The other three are Professor Arne Brataas (QuSpin's director); Professor Jacob Linder and Professor Justin W. Wells.

== Retracted papers ==
- Sudbø J, Lee JJ, Lippman SM, Mork J, Sagen S, Flatner N, Ristimäki A, Sudbø A, Mao L, Zhou X, Kildal W, Evensen JF, Reith A, Dannenberg AJ. Non-steroidal anti-inflammatory drugs and the risk of oral cancer: a nested case-control study. Lancet. 2005 Oct 15-21;366(9494):1359-66.
  - Retraction: Horton R. Lancet. 2006 Feb 4;367(9508):382.
- Sudbø J, Lippman SM, Lee JJ, Mao L, Kildal W, Sudbø A, Sagen S, Bryne M, El-Naggar A, Risberg B, Evensen JF, Reith A. The influence of resection and aneuploidy on mortality in oral leukoplakia. N Engl J Med. 2004 Apr 1;350(14):1405-13.
  - Retraction: Curfman GD, Morrissey S, Drazen JM. N Engl J Med. 2006 Nov 2;355(18):1927.
