= 1953 Danish constitutional and electoral age referendum =

Danish referendum in 1953

A constitutional and electoral age referendum was held in Denmark on 28 May 1953. Both proposals were approved by voters, leading to both a new constitution taking effect on 5 June, and the electoral age being lowered from 25 to 23 years, also starting on 5 June. Voter turnout was 59.1% for the constitution question and 57.1% for the voting age question.

== Constitution ==
According to the previous constitution of 1915, with changes from 1920, in order for a new constitution to pass, it must first be passed in one Rigsdag, which must then be disbanded, a new parliamentary election called, and the new parliament must then also pass the constitution, in unchanged form; and finally, a majority of voters in a referendum, with a requirement of at least 45% turnout, must also pass the proposed constitution. When the referendum took place on 28 May 1953, it concluded the last of these three steps, and the constitution could take effect on 5 June.

=== Changes from the previous constitution ===
The Ministry of Education of Denmark lists the changes from the previous constitution as follows:

- The Act of Succession was changed so that females could also inherit the Danish throne, though still preferring even younger brothers. As the reigning King Frederik IX had three daughters and no sons, this meant that Princess Margrethe became the Heir Presumptive instead of her uncle Prince Knud. As Frederik IX's wife Queen Ingrid was not expected to (and in fact did not) have any more children, this effectively ensured that Princess Margrethe would become Queen of Denmark, which she did.
- Parliamentarism, in the sense that no government may have a majority of members of parliament against it, is made explicit in the constitution. (This principle had de facto existed since 1901, but the 1953 constitution made it law).
- The Landsting was abolished, and the Folketing expanded to 179 members.
- Voting by convicts and the poor is no longer outlawed in the constitution, but subject to normal laws.
- The electoral age was removed, to be decided by referendums.
- Greenland was made an integral part of Denmark, and would elect two members of parliament.
- Referendums can be held over most kinds of laws, provided that one third of parliament demand it (this has only happened once).
- Citizens' civil rights are increased.
- The office of Folketing's ombudsman is established.
- Sovereignty can be forfeited to what the constitution calls mellemfolkelige myndigheder, which can include Supranational unions such as the current European Union. For this to take place, it must either happen with 5/6 of members of parliament voting in favour, or by holding a referendum.

== Voting age ==
One of the proposed changes in the new constitution was that the electoral age would now be decided by laws that required a binding referendum. Prior to the 1953 referendum, the electoral age was 25 years. The electoral age portion of the referendum asked whether the new electoral age should be 23 or 21 years, with 30.0% voting for 23 years and 25.0% for 21 years, thus passing the former of the two.

== Results ==
=== Constitutional amendments ===
Choice	Votes	%
For	1,183,292	78.8
Against	319,135	21.2
Invalid/blank votes	25,231	–
Total	1,527,658	100
Registered voters/turnout	2,585,800	59.1
Source: Nohlen & Stöver

=== Voting age ===
Choice	Votes	%
23 years	840,815	54.6
21 years	700,122	45.4
Invalid/blank votes	67,888	–
Total	1,608,625	100
Registered voters/turnout	2,815,100	57.1
Source: Nohlen & Stöver

== See also ==
- 2009 Danish Act of Succession referendum
