= Inga Jacobi =

German dancer (1891–1937)

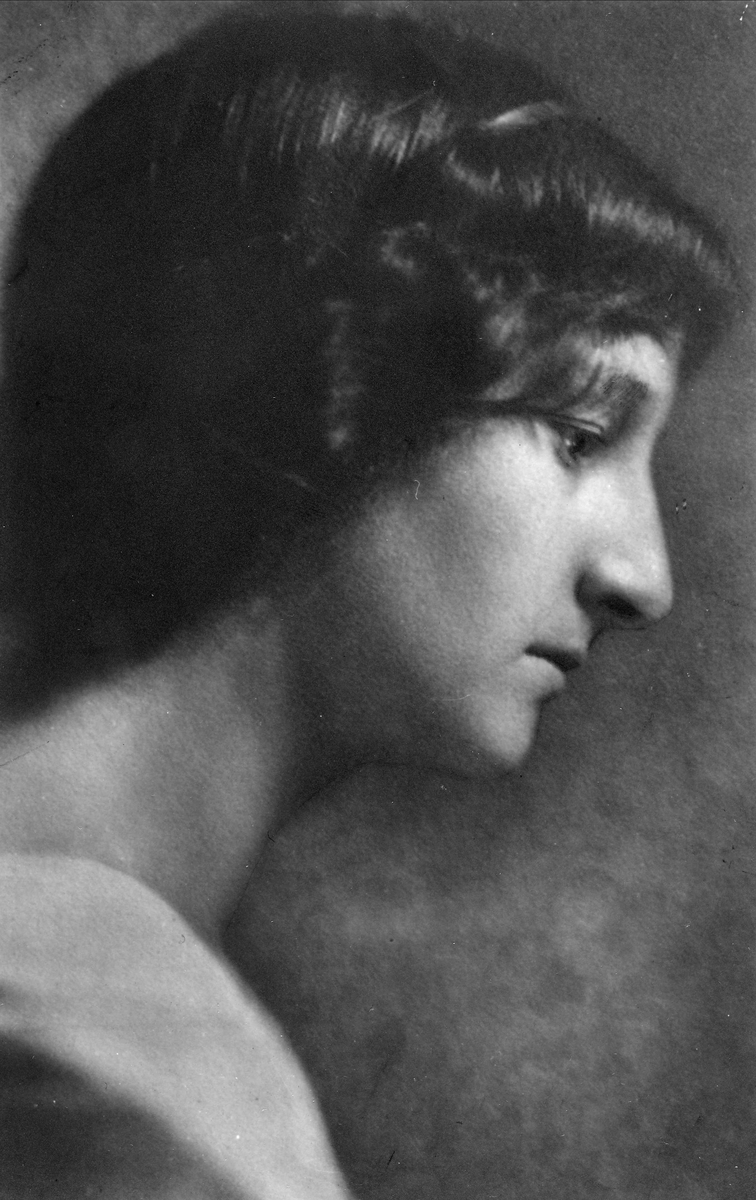
- Born: 2 July 1891; Magdeburg, Germany
- Died: 12 October 1937 (aged 46); Germany
- Occupation: Dancer
- Spouse: Henrik Grevenor
- Relatives: Fridtjof Mjøen (cousin)

Inga Jacobi (2 July 1891 – 12 October 1937) was a German-born ballet dancer and choreographer who settled in Norway.

== Biography ==
She was born in Magdeburg to Bernhard Theodor Albert Jacobi (1856–1914) and Ragna Hansen Mjøen (1858–1939). She was a cousin of actor and theatre director Fridtjof Mjøen (1897–1967).

She studied ballet in Dresden, where she trained with music educator Émile Jaques-Dalcroze (1865–1950). After the death of her father, she moved with her Norwegian born mother to Kristiania in 1915. She married art historian Henrik Grevenor in 1919.

She established her own ballet school in 1916. Her modern dance expression gained a foothold on established stages. Among her students were the actress Ragnhild Hald (1896–1975) and the ballet dancer and choreographer Gerd Kjølaas (1909–2000). She died in Germany in 1937.
