= Hans Tabor =

Danish diplomat and politician

Minister of Foreign Affairs
- In office 1 October 1967 – 2 February 1968
- Prime Minister: Jens Otto Krag
- Preceded by: Jens Otto Krag
- Succeeded by: Poul Hartling

Personal details
- Born: 25 April 1922 Copenhagen, Denmark
- Died: 19 November 2003 (aged 81)
- Party: Social Democratic Party.

Hans Tabor (April 25, 1922 – November 19, 2003) was a Danish diplomat and politician representing the Social Democratic Party.

He was the Danish ambassador to the UN in the 1960s. When the Six-Day War broke out in 1967 he was the head of the United Nations Security Council, and he managed to negotiate a cease fire between Israel and the Arab countries.

Because of his success at the UN he was named Foreign Minister of Denmark by prime minister Jens Otto Krag. He only held office 4 months, because the Social Democrats lost the 1968 election. Tabor then returned to the diplomacy, and was in 1974 briefly ambassador to the UN.

Political offices
Preceded by Jens Otto Krag	Foreign Minister of Denmark; October 1, 1967 – February 2, 1968	Succeeded by Poul Hartling
