= Jean-Pierre Hocké =

Swiss politician

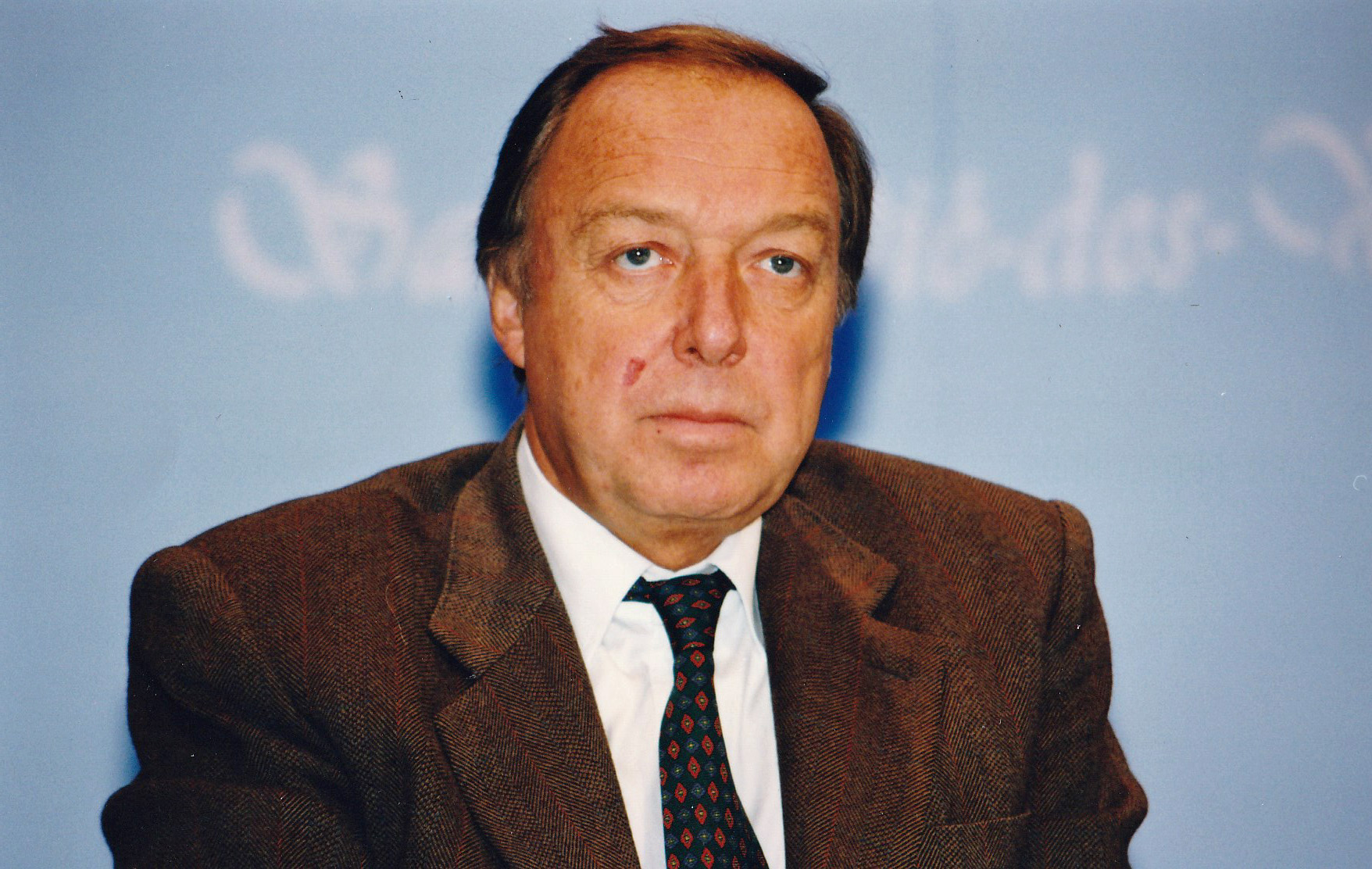
- Hocké in 1996

6th United Nations High Commissioner for Refugees
- In office 1 January 1986 – 25 October 1989
- Preceded by: Poul Hartling
- Succeeded by: Thorvald Stoltenberg

Personal details
- Born: 31 March 1938 Lausanne, Switzerland
- Died: 26 July 2021 (aged 83) Lausanne, Switzerland
- Education: University of Lausanne

Jean-Pierre Hocké (31 March 1938 – 26 July 2021) was a Swiss politician and United Nations official. He served as High Commissioner of the UNHCR in 1986–1989, and before that as Director of Operations for the International Committee of the Red Cross (ICRC).

== Personal life and career ==
Hocké was born in Lausanne, and graduated from the University of Lausanne with a degree in economics and commerce in 1961. He joined the International Committee of the Red Cross (ICRC) in 1968, and served as Director of the Operations Department there from 1973 to 1985, and as a member of the ICRC Directorate from 1981 to 1985.

He was elected High Commissioner of the UNHCR in December 1985, and took office in 1986. Under his leadership, the UNHCR launched the International Conference on Central American Refugees (CIREFCA), with the aim of helping people displaced and affected by conflicts in Central America. It also worked to organize the voluntary return of Vietnamese refugees, and began setting up camps for Ethiopian refugees in Sudan and Somali refugees in Ethiopia. Hocké resigned as High Commissioner in October 1989, amid controversies regarding his alleged misuse of UN funding for first-class air travel. He denied any wrongdoing, and was subsequently cleared by an investigation into the matter.

Hocké died in Lausanne at the age of 83.

Diplomatic posts
Preceded by Poul Hartling	United Nations High Commissioner for Refugees; 1986–1989	Succeeded by Thorvald Stoltenberg
