= Center for Quantum Spintronics =

Norwegian research center

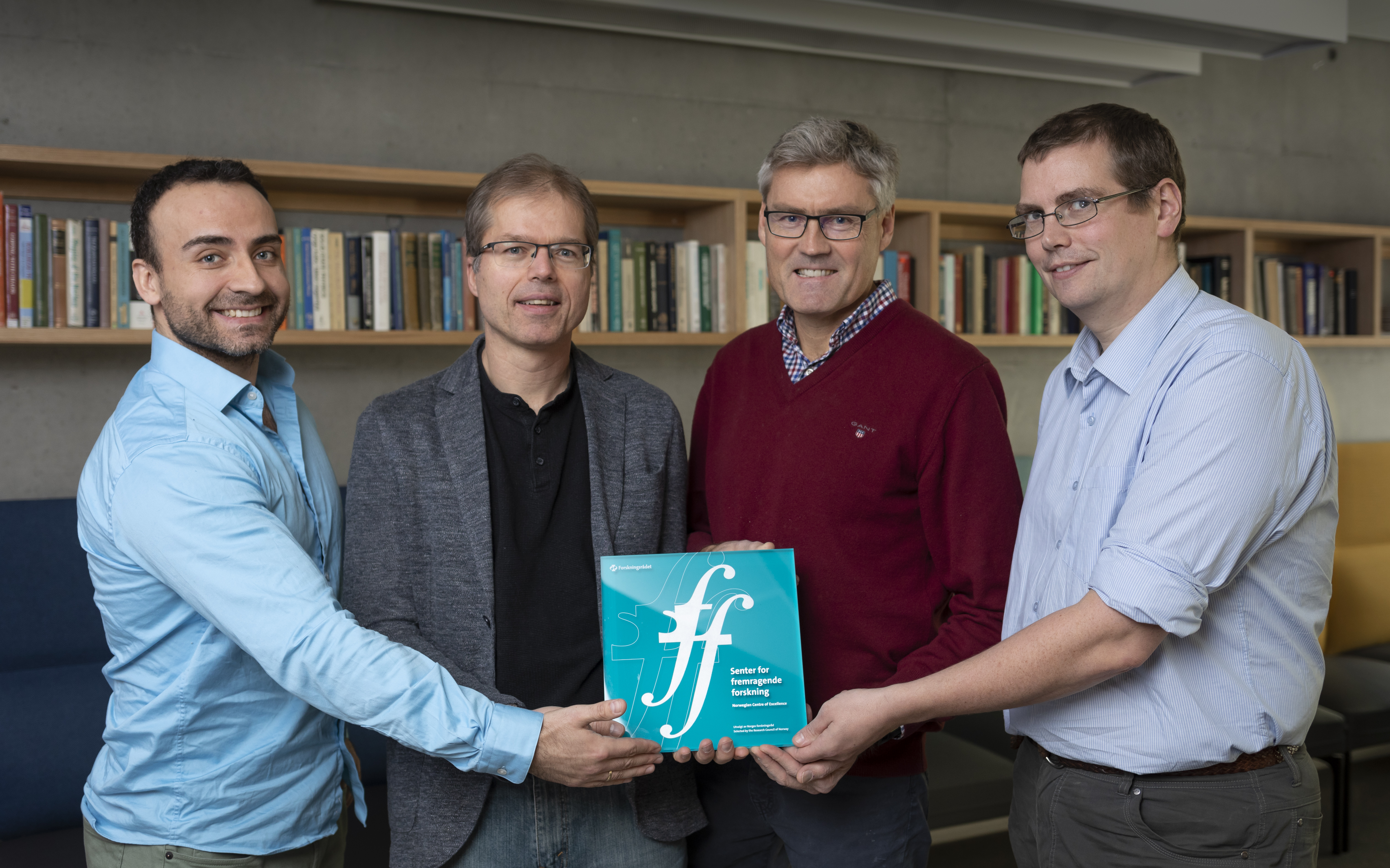
The QuSpin center management, left to right: professor Jacob Linder; professor Arne Brataas (Center Leader 2017-2023); professor Asle Sudbø (Center Leader 2023-2027) and professor Justin Wells.

The Center for Quantum Spintronics (QuSpin) is a research center at the Department of Physics at the Norwegian University of Science and Technology (NTNU).

In 2017, the Research Council of Norway designated QuSpin as a Center of Excellence (SFF) for the period 2017–2027.

Spintronics, or spin electronics, is a field in condensed matter physics, a study of the physical effects associated with quantum mechanical spin. Electrons do not only have charge. They also have a spin, an apparent inner rotation, as if the electrons spin around their own axis. Spintronics has already contributed to a revolution in data storage, and was, among other things, the basis for Apple's music player iPod.

The researchers at QuSpin aim to describe and develop new ways of controlling electrical signals. This may contribute to a major development in energy efficient information and communication technology. The results of their research have already attracted interest internationally, and have been discussed and published in several scientific journals, e.g. Nature and Science.

In electronics, the electrical charge of electrons is used to store and process information. Electric currents generate a lot of heat, which is emitted to the surroundings. This is an increasing challenge, and limits how small and efficient electronic devices can be.

QuSpin works to find new ways of controlling and utilizing electrons' intrinsic spin. The goal is to control the spin, and other quantum mechanical variables, using new combinations of nanoscale materials. Their research includes studies of quantum mechanical transport properties for superconducting, magnetic and topological materials.

QuSpin has research activity in both theoretical and experimental physics. By the end of 2018, the center had a team of more than 60 members, of which 11 were professors and associate professors; three researchers; seven postdocs and 26 Ph.D. students.

The center management consists (as of 2023) of four primary investigators: Professor Arne Brataas; Professor Jacob Linder; Professor Asle Sudbø (Center Leader) and Associate Professor Hendrik Bentmann.
