= Matthias Stoltenberg =

Norwegian painter

Mathias Stoltenberg
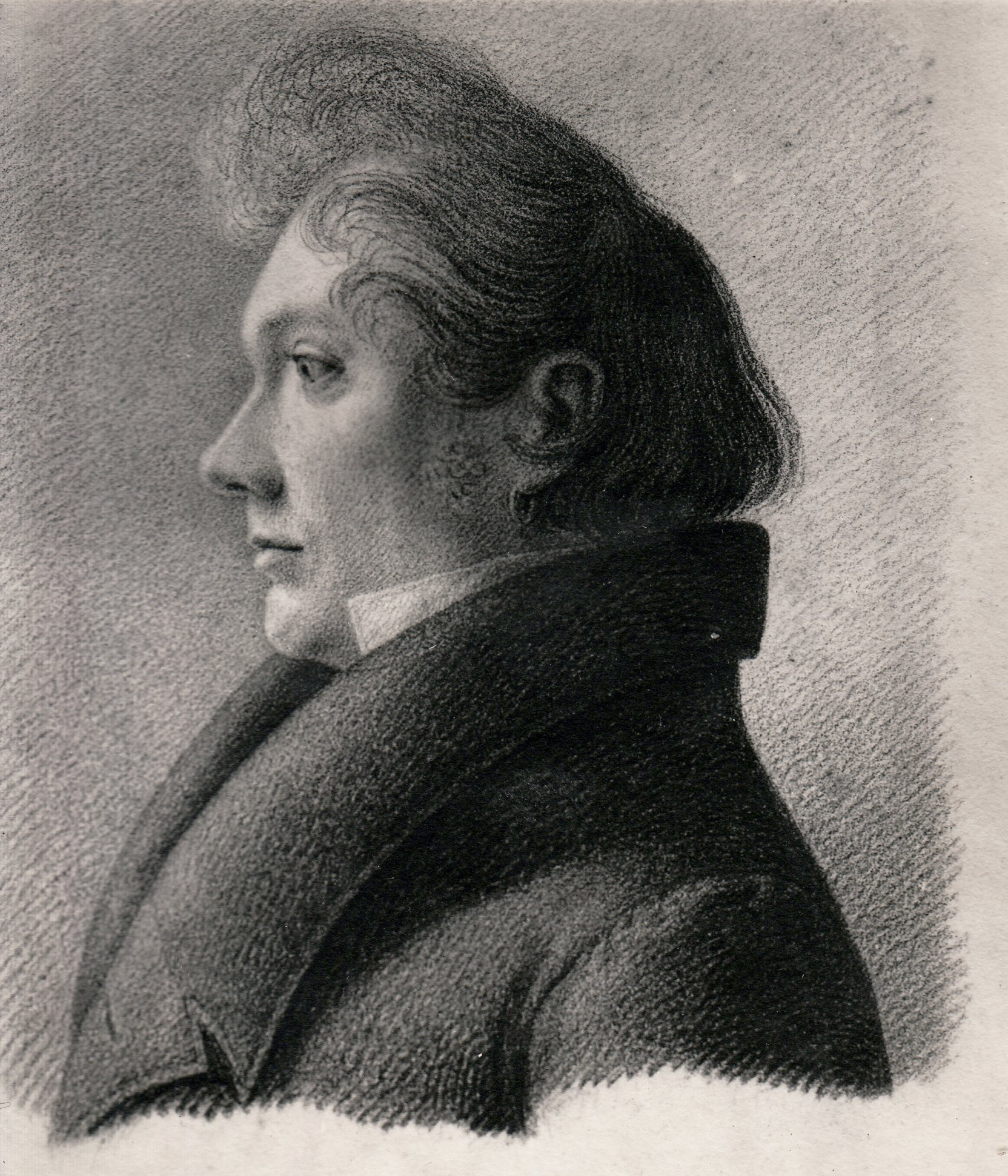
- Matthias Stoltenberg; portrait by Karoline Steen (1862)
- Born: 21 July 1799; Tønsberg, Norway
- Died: 2 November 1871 (aged 72)
- Occupation: Painter
- Parent: Carl Peter Stoltenberg

Mathias Stoltenberg (21 July 1799 – 2 November 1871) was a Norwegian painter. He earned his living mostly as a travelling portrait painter and furniture restorer. His paintings were later rediscovered and presented at the 1914 Jubilee Exhibition in Kristiania.

== Personal life ==
Stoltenberg was born in Tønsberg, the son of merchant and politician Carl Peter Stoltenberg and Karen Mathea Bull. He lost his sense of hearing as a child, and died in poverty in Vang in 1871.

== Career ==
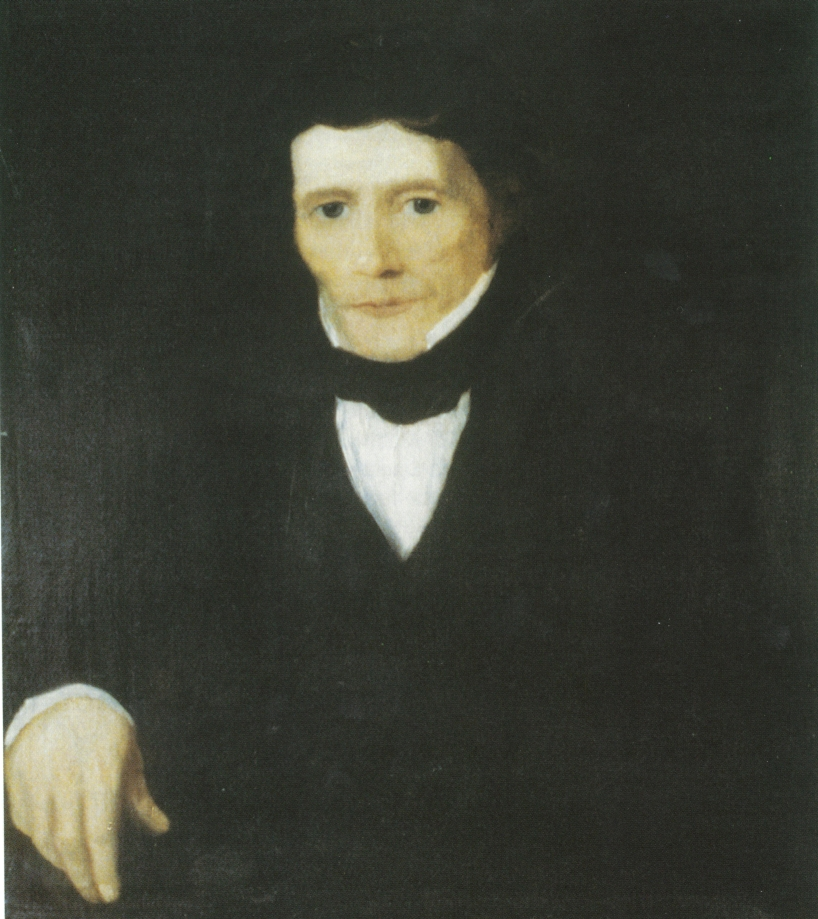
Stoltenberg's portrait of Hans Michelsen

Stoltenberg studied carpentry in Copenhagen, where he also took lessons in portrait painting with Christian August Lorentzen. Back in Norway he earned his living as a travelling portrait painter and carpenter. After his father died in 1830, the family home in Tønsberg dissolved. Stoltenberg's travels covered large parts of Norway. During the 1830s and 1840s he visited Gudbrandsdalen, Dovre, the districts around Kristaniafjorden, Northern Norway, Trondheim, Numedal, Telemark, and Østerdalen. From the late 1840s he lived in Vang, Hedmark. His paintings were mostly portraits, and also landscapes.

His art was recognized after the 1914 Jubilee Exhibition at Frogner in Kristiania, and he is represented in several museums. The National Gallery of Norway has fifteen of his portraits and three landscape paintings, among them Utsikt til Vang kirke (View of Vang church) from 1863.

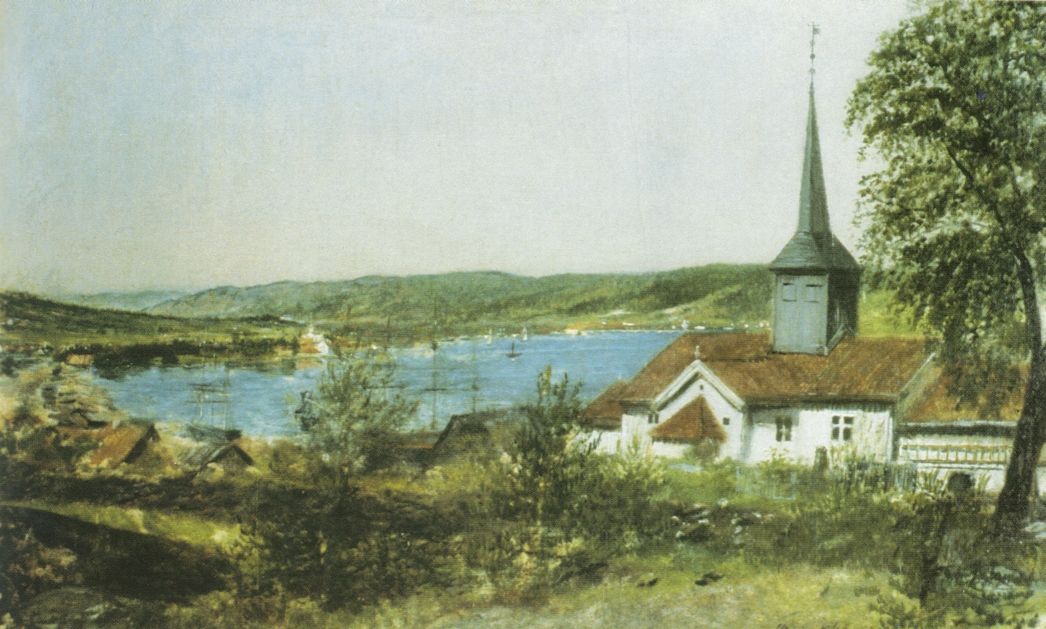
Strømsø Church, 1847

Stoltenberg's paintings were first described by Hans Ødegaard in 1914, in Norske malere. Mathias Stoltenberg og Lars Hertervig. Ødegaard was responsible for the exhibition of older Norwegian art at the 1914 Jubilee Exhibition. In addition to Stoltenberg, Lars Hertervig, Johannes Flintoe and Peder Balke were other more or less forgotten painters who found their way into museums and galleries after this exhibition.

Henrik Grevenor wrote a biography of Stoltenberg in 1935, Mathias Stoltenberg. En kunstner mellom to tidsaldre (English: Mathias Stoltenberg. An artist between two epochs).
