= Stetind in Fog =

1864 painting by Peder Balke

- Stetind i tåke (Norwegian)
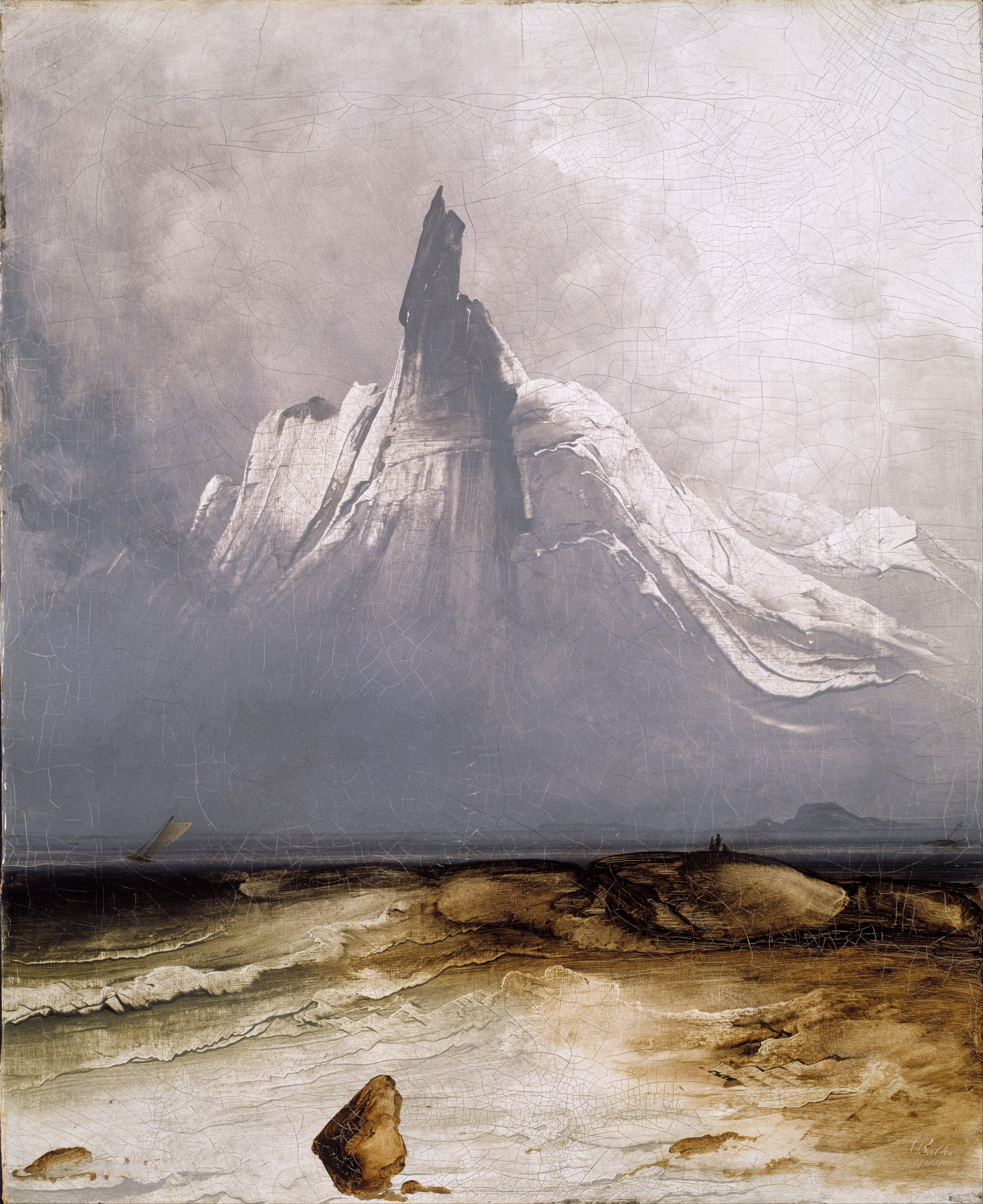
- Artist: Peder Balke
- Year: 1864
- Medium: oil on canvas
- Dimensions: 58 cm × 71 cm (23 in × 28 in)
- Location: National Gallery, Oslo

Stetind in Fog (Norwegian: Stetind i tåke) is an oil painting by Peder Balke from 1864.

== Genesis ==
Peder Balke got the inspiration for the painting during his first extended trip in 1832 to seek out North Norwegian nature. The dramatic landscape along the northern Norwegian coast impressed him and he returned to Stetind as a motif on several occasions later in life. Similar motifs are also in the 26 sketches that he sold to King Louis Philippe of France, which are now in the Louvre in Paris.

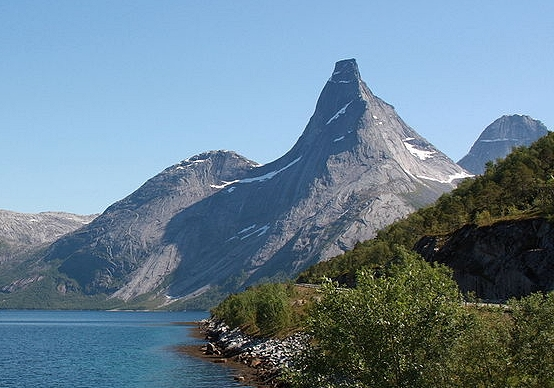

Stetind is situated on the Stefjorden, at the headwaters of the Tysfjorden. In a Norwegian Broadcasting Corporation poll it was chosen as Norway's national mountain.

== Painting ==
The painting is a dramatic composition in the Romantic tradition and depicts the relationship of man to the forces of nature. The mountain of Stetind is positioned in the middle of the picture, which has a fairly low horizon line. A gray fog dominates the painting. Out in the wind are two boats and a small group of people standing on a rock knoll looking out over the sea.

== Provenance ==
The painting was bought by the National Gallery in Oslo in 1980. The National Gallery also has two smaller versions of the same scene.
