= Henrik Grevenor =

Norwegian art historian

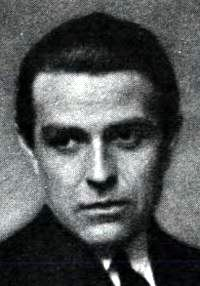
- Born: 27 May 1896; Stavanger, Norway
- Died: 3 September 1937 (aged 41); Oslo, Norway
- Occupation: art historian
- Spouse: Inga Jacobi

Henrik Grevenor (27 May 1896 – 3 September 1937) was a Norwegian art historian.

== Biography ==
Henrik Gustav Rønneberg Grevenor was born in Stavanger; the son of Gustav Andreas Michaelsen and Karin Rønneberg. In 1916 he became an assistant at the Antiquities Collection at the University of Oslo, promoted to amanuensis in 1918. From 1917 he was also at the University's ethnographic museum. He was also a lecturer at the University of Oslo on the subject of art history. From 1928 he was deputy manager at the Norwegian Museum of Decorative Arts and Design.

His thesis from 1928, Norsk malerkunst under renessanse og barokk 1550–1700, is regarded a fundamental work in the history of Norwegian art. Among his other works are Fra laugstiden i Norge from 1924, and monographies of Jean Heiberg from 1933, and of Mathias Stoltenberg from 1935.

== Selected works ==
- Fra Laugstiden i Norge (1924)
- Norsk billedkunst gjennem tusen aar (1925)
- Norsk malerkunst under renessanse og barokk 1550–1700 ( 1928)
- Jean Heiberg (1933)
- Mathias Stoltenberg. En kunstner mellem to tidsaldre (1935)

== Personal life ==
He was married in 1919 to ballet dancer and choreographer Inga Jacobi (1891–1937).
