= K. B. Andersen =

Danish politician

K. B. Andersen Cand. polit.
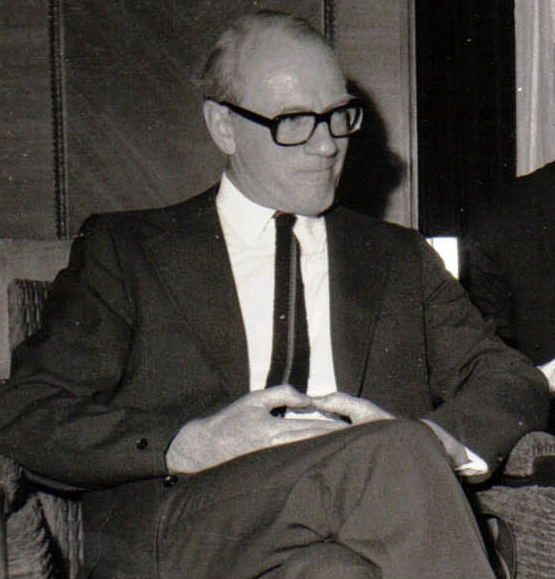

Speaker of the Folketing
- In office 3 October 1978 – 8 December 1981
- Monarch: Margrethe II
- Preceded by: Karl Skytte
- Succeeded by: Svend Jakobsen

Minister of Foreign Affairs
- In office 13 February 1975 – 1 June 1978
- Prime Minister: Anker Jørgensen
- Preceded by: Ove Guldberg
- Succeeded by: Anker Jørgensen
- In office 11 October 1971 – 19 December 1973
- Prime Minister: Jens Otto Krag; Anker Jørgensen
- Preceded by: Poul Hartling
- Succeeded by: Ove Guldberg

Acting Prime Minister of Denmark
- In office 3 October 1972 – 5 October 1972
- Preceded by: Jens Otto Krag
- Succeeded by: Anker Jørgensen

Minister of Education
- In office 26 September 1964 – 2 February 1968
- Prime Minister: Jens Otto Krag
- Preceded by: Kristen Helveg Petersen
- Succeeded by: Helge Larsen

Member of the Folketing
- In office 1973–1981
- In office 1957–1970

Personal details
- Born: 1 December 1914 Copenhagen, Denmark
- Died: 23 March 1984 (aged 69) Copenhagen, Denmark
- Party: Social Democrats

Knud Børge Andersen (1 December 1914 – 23 March 1984) was a Danish politician, who served as Danish Minister of Education and Minister of Foreign Affairs, and held international offices.

== Biography ==
Andersen finished his degree in political science in 1940, worked for Statsradiofonien from 1935 to 1950, and was the headmaster of the "Workers' Folk high school" in Roskilde from 1950 to 1957. He entered politics, and was elected to the Folketing as a Social Democrat in 1957. He served as a member of the Council of Europe from 1963 to 1964.

Andersen served as Minister of Education in the Cabinet of Jens Otto Krag from 1964 to 1968. As a Minister of Education, Andersen instated the Higher Preparatory Examination (HF) and abolished corporal punishment in schools, and turned the scrolls of the Icelandic sagas back to Iceland. In 1970, Andersen left the Folketing, but was appointed Foreign Minister under Jens Otto Krag and later Anker Jørgensen, from 1971 to 1973 and again from 1975 to 1978. Andersen was acting Prime Minister when Jens Otto Krag resigned in October 1972, until Anker Jørgensen was appointed new Prime Minister a few days later. When Poul Schlüter in 1993 similarly attempted to have an acting prime minister appointed, royal cabinet secretary Niels Eilschou Holm considered both that appointment, and the appointment of Andersen, to be unconstitutional. By 1973, Andersen had re-entered the Folketing.

As Foreign Minister, Andersen became well known in European foreign affairs circles, and was invited to the Bilderberg Conference. At a NATO council in December 1972, Andersen received heavy criticism from Sir Alec Douglas-Home, William P. Rogers, and NATO's Secretary General, for Denmark's eight percent reduction in their defense budget. This was at a time when the more powerful nations of Europe were calling for an increase in military spending.

Andersen was President of the European Economic Community Council of Ministers in 1978. During this time he was involved in the economic sanctions against South Africa. He ended his tenure in the Folketing in 1981, after serving as its Speaker from 1978 to 1981. He was a critic of Denmark's political system. His belief was that the large number of political parties in Denmark made for political instability and for difficulty in forming coalition governments.

Political offices
Preceded by Kristen Helveg Petersen	Education Minister of Denmark; 26 September 1964 – 2 February 1968	Succeeded by Helge Larsen
Preceded by Poul Hartling	Foreign Minister of Denmark; 11 October 1971 – 19 December 1973	Succeeded by Ove Guldberg
Preceded by Ove Guldberg	Foreign Minister of Denmark; 13 February 1975 – 1 July 1978	Succeeded by Anker Jørgensen
Preceded by Karl Skytte	Speaker of the Folketing; October 3, 1978 – December 8, 1981	Succeeded by Svend Jakobsen
