= Karin Stoltenberg =

Norwegian geneticist, politician and public official

- Born: Karin Heiberg; 23 November 1931; Paterson, New Jersey, USA
- Died: 17 October 2012 (aged 80); Oslo, Norway
- Known for: Politician and feminist, mother of prime minister Jens Stoltenberg, wife of foreign minister Thorvald Stoltenberg
- Political party: Labour Party
- Spouse: Thorvald Stoltenberg
- Children: Camilla, Jens, and Nini
- Parent(s): Elisabeth Cecilie Thaulow Petersen (1903-1968) and Ørnulf Heiberg (1898-1973)
- Relatives: Marianne Heiberg (sister)

Karin Stoltenberg (née Heiberg; 23 November 1931 – 17 October 2012) was a Norwegian geneticist, politician and public official noted for her efforts to develop a coherent family policy in Norway, feminist activities, and for being the mother of prime minister Jens Stoltenberg, and wife of foreign minister Thorvald Stoltenberg.

== Biography ==
Karin Heiberg was born into a Norwegian middle-class family in Paterson, New Jersey (USA), and became politically interested as a socialist in her early teens. She met her husband-to-be when they were 18, but after a short romance she moved to Canada with her family, where she lived for six years and was briefly married. After her divorce in Canada, she returned to Norway planning to complete a doctorate in genetics. She notified Stoltenberg that she was back, and they decided to get married within 24 hours of reuniting. She broke off her academic career in science but completed studies in political science at the University of Oslo. Karin and Thorvald Stoltenberg were married in 1957.

The Stoltenberg family relocated often as a result of Thorvald's career as a diplomat. Karin started her career as a government official working for the Norwegian Agency for Development Cooperation. In 1972 she accepted a position as senior official in what was then the Consumer and Administration department. There she, under the direction of Inger Louise Valle developed several policy initiatives to include women in the workforce. She also worked as a state secretary in the Ministry of Commerce and Shipping, and the Ministry of Trade of Industry. She characterized herself as being a bureaucrat rather than a politician and rarely participated in her husband's political activities.
