= 1963 Danish land laws referendum =

A referendum on land laws was held in Denmark on 25 June 1963. The four land laws, which had already been passed by the Danish parliament, were rejected by voters. This is the only time in Danish history that a law passed by parliament was sent to a public referendum by a minority in parliament.

== Background ==
Campaign poster with the word NEJ (English: NO)

On May 31, 1963, Prime Minister Jens Otto Krag's two parties in government (the Social Democrats and the Social Liberal Party), along with the Socialist People's Party, passed ten land laws in parliament. The remaining parties (the Liberals, the Conservative People's Party, and the Independent Party) voted against the laws.

On the same day, 71 of 179 members of parliament (i.e. every member of the Liberals and the Conservative People's Party) handed in a signed decree that a public referendum must be held about four of these laws. In doing so, they invoked chapter 42, section 1 in the Danish constitution which states that a law that has been passed can be sent to a public referendum if one third of parliament signs a decree. This chapter and section of the constitution had never been used before.

== The disputed land laws ==
=== Obligatory residence ===
The first of the four laws sent to public referendum concerned the obligatory residence of agricultural estates in rural areas. According to the law, anyone acquiring an agricultural estate was required to take residence at the estate within six months of the acquisition. Acquisition of more than one such estate was to require permission from the Minister for Agriculture.

=== State's first option to buy ===
This law stated that, when a land owner sold a property in a rural area of 1 hectare (10,000 m^{2}; 2.5 acres) or more, the state would have the first option to buy said property. The purpose of the law was to give the state the opportunity to acquire land for use in agriculture, gardening, recreational areas, or public purposes.

=== Town's first option to buy ===
Unlike the first two laws, this law centered on properties outside of rural areas, i.e. in towns and the outskirts of towns. The contents and intent of the law were much like those of the laws regarding the state's first option to buy, except that the purchaser would be the municipalities and that the law affected properties of 6,000 square metres (65,000 sq ft) or more.

=== Preservation of natural amenities ===
The fourth law was to make it possible to list areas for protection on basis of their natural beauty, their location, or their peculiarity.

== Results ==
=== Obligatory residence ===
Choice	Votes	%
For	843,756	38.4
Against	1,354,588	61.6
Invalid/blank votes	23,920	–
Total	2,222,264	100
Source: Nohlen & Stöver

=== State's first option to buy ===
Choice	Votes	%
For	848,494	38.6
Against	1,347,942	61.4
Invalid/blank votes	25,687	–
Total	2,222,123	100
Source: Nohlen & Stöver

=== Town's first option to buy ===
Choice	Votes	%
For	872,042	39.6
Against	1,328,036	60.4
Invalid/blank votes	22,160	–
Total	2,222,238	100
Source: Nohlen & Stöver

=== Preservation of natural amenities ===
Choice	Votes	%
For	937,259	42.6
Against	1,261,545	57.4
Invalid/blank votes	23,391	–
Total	2,222,195	100
Source: Nohlen & Stöver

== Aftermath ==
As a result of the four laws being rejected, the remaining six laws were withdrawn as well.
