= Gerd Kjølaas =

Norwegian ballet dancer and choreographer

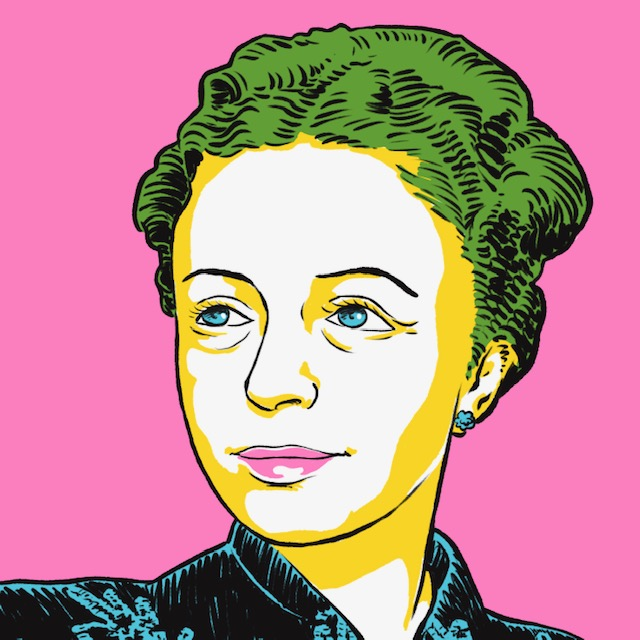
- Born: 22 May 1909; Trondheim, Norway
- Died: 30 January 2000 (aged 90)
- Occupation: Dancer
- Awards: King's Medal of Merit

Gerd Kjølaas (22 May 1909 – 30 January 2000) was a Norwegian ballet dancer and choreographer.

She was born in Trondheim to wholesaler Hans Martin Kjølaas and Karen Bohne, and grew up in Kristiania. She studied ballet with Inga Jacobi and Kurt Jooss, and at the Royal Academy of Dance in London. She made her dance debut in 1931. In 1945 she choreographed Mot Ballade, based on a short story by Hans E. Kinck, which premiered at Det Norske Teatret. Among her students were Anne Borg and Ellen Kjellberg. Her books include Fri dans from 1946, and Dans, ropte livet from 1998. In 1969 she was awarded the King's Medal of Merit in gold.
