= Carl Peter Stoltenberg =

Norwegian merchant, ship owner and politician

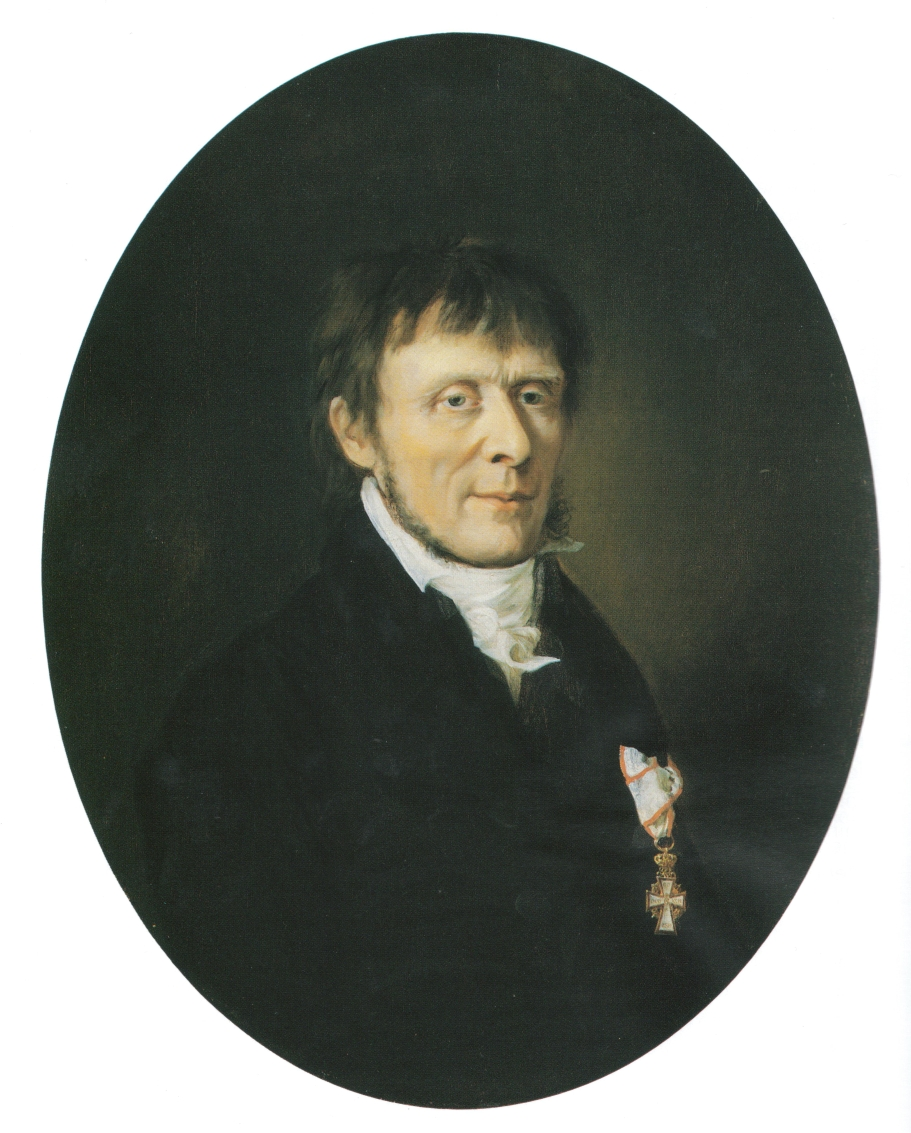
- Born: 28 January 1770; Vaale, Norway
- Died: 13 November 1830 (aged 60)
- Occupations: Merchant, ship owner and politician
- Known for: Member of the Norwegian Constituent Assembly in 1814

Carl Peter Stoltenberg (28 January 1770 – 13 November 1830) was a Norwegian merchant, ship owner and politician. He was a representative at the Norwegian Constituent Assembly at Eidsvoll Manor during 1814.

== Biography ==
Carl Peter Stoltenberg was born in Vaale prestegjeld (now part of Tønsberg Municipality) in Vestfold county, Norway. His father was a vicar. He belonged to a well established merchandising family. Three of his uncles ran the business in Tønsberg, and then all died without leaving close heirs to assume control. As a consequence, Stoltenberg inherited the family's mercantile business at age twenty. He expanded the business into both wholesale and retail. He also extended his business into shipping. In 1819, he took over the Vallø saltworks, however an economic crisis in 1830 put his estate into bankruptcy.

He represented the city of Tønsberg at the Norwegian Constituent Assembly at Eidsvoll Manor in 1814, and later a member of the Parliament of Norway. At the National Assembly at Eidsvoll, he sat in the Finance Committee and belonged to the independence party (Selvstendighetspartiet). Stoltenberg was a member of Parliament from 1815 to 1816, setting on the committees for financial, banking and mining.

He was married to his cousin Karen Mathea Krefting Bull (1775–1859) and was the father of painter Matthias Stoltenberg.

== Memorials ==
Both Stoltenbergs gate (Stoltenberg Street) and Stoltenbergparken (Stoltenberg Park) in Tønsberg were named in his honor.

== Related Reading ==
- Holme Jørn (2014) De kom fra alle kanter - Eidsvollsmennene og deres hus (Oslo: Cappelen Damm) ISBN 978-82-02-44564-5
