= Poul Hartling =

Danish politician and diplomat

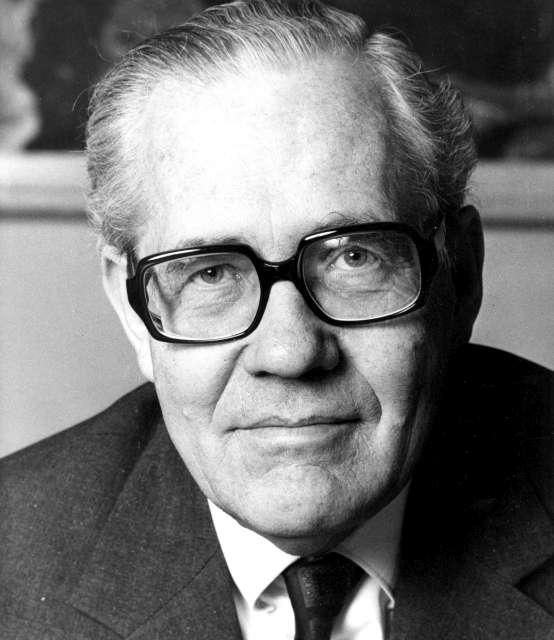

5th United Nations High Commissioner for Refugees
- In office 1 January 1978 – 31 December 1985
- Preceded by: Sadruddin Aga Khan
- Succeeded by: Jean-Pierre Hocké

Prime Minister of Denmark
- In office 19 December 1973 – 13 February 1975
- Monarch: Margrethe II
- Preceded by: Anker Jørgensen
- Succeeded by: Anker Jørgensen

Minister of Foreign Affairs
- In office 2 February 1968 – 11 October 1971
- Prime Minister: Hilmar Baunsgaard
- Preceded by: Hans Tabor
- Succeeded by: Knud Børge Andersen

Personal details
- Born: 14 August 1914 Copenhagen, Denmark
- Died: 30 April 2000 (aged 85) Copenhagen, Denmark
- Party: Venstre

Poul Hartling (14 August 1914 – 30 April 2000) was a Danish politician and diplomat. He was leader of Venstre from 1965 to 1977, and served as Prime Minister of Denmark from 1973 to 1975. Prior to that, he served as foreign minister from 1968 to 1971 under Hilmar Baunsgaard. From 1978 to 1985, he served as the United Nations High Commissioner for Refugees.

== Career ==
Hartling graduated in theology 1939, became ordained as a priest, and later headed a teacher's seminary. He was a member of parliament 1957–1960, and again 1964–1977, and party leader 1965–1977. Hartling served as Foreign Minister of Denmark from 1968 until 1971 in the Cabinet of Hilmar Baunsgaard. Hartling was prime minister from 1973 until 1975. In the chaotic situation with many new parties after the 1973 Danish parliamentary election his single party minority government commanded only 22 out 179 seats in parliament. In social policy, Hartling's time as prime minister witnessed the passage of the Social Assistance Act of 1974, which instructed municipal authorities to provide day-care and recreation centres for children and young people.

Hartling then left Danish politics to work for the United Nations. He was the United Nations High Commissioner for Refugees (UNHCR) from 1978 until 1985. In 1981 Hartling accepted the Nobel Peace Prize on behalf of the UNHCR.

Hartling died 30 April 2000 in Copenhagen. He is buried with his wife Elsebeth in Hørsholm.

Political offices
Preceded by Hans Tabor	Foreign Minister of Denmark; 2 February 1968 – 11 October 1971	Succeeded by Knud Børge Andersen
Preceded by Anker Jørgensen	Prime Minister of Denmark; 19 December 1973 – 13 February 1975	Succeeded by Anker Jørgensen
Party political offices
Preceded by Erik Eriksen	Leader of Venstre; 1965–1977	Succeeded by Henning Christophersen
Diplomatic posts
Preceded by Sadruddin Aga Khan	United Nations High Commissioner for Refugees; 1978–1985	Succeeded by Jean-Pierre Hocké
