= Camilla Stoltenberg =

Norwegian physician and researcher (born 1958)

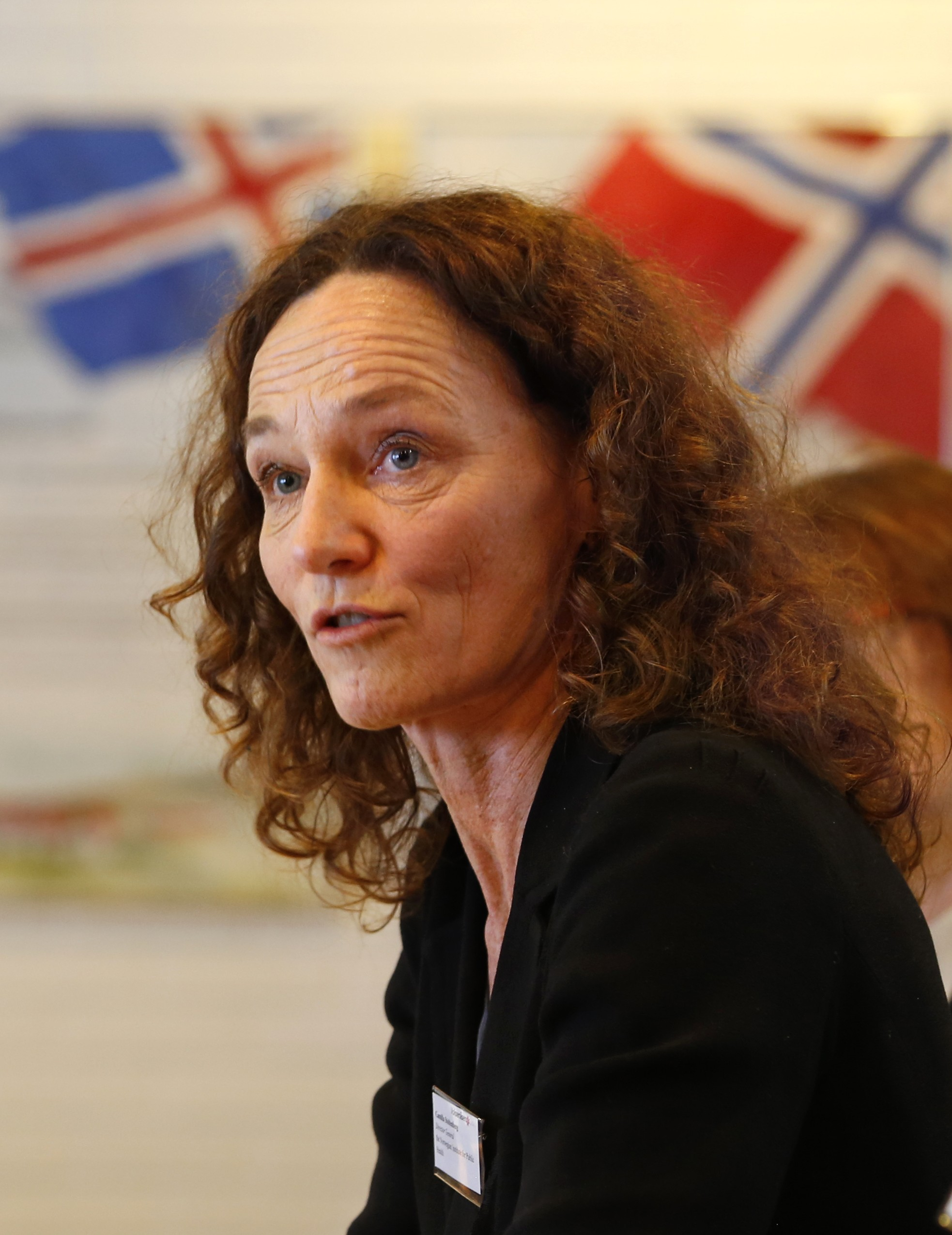
- Born: 5 February 1958 (age 68); Oslo, Norway
- Education: University of Oslo; University of California, Berkeley
- Spouse: Atle Aas
- Children: 2
- Scientific career
- Workplaces: Norwegian Institute of Public Health

Camilla Stoltenberg (born 5 February 1958) is a Norwegian physician and researcher. Since 13 August 2012, she has been Director-General of the Norwegian Institute of Public Health. She is the sister of former Prime Minister of Norway and General Secretary of NATO, Jens Stoltenberg.

== Early life and education ==
Stoltenberg attended Oslo Waldorf School and studied sociology and medicine at the University of Oslo, where she graduated with the cand.med. degree. She later obtained a research doctorate (dr.med.) at the same university. She has also studied medical anthropology at the University of California, Berkeley.

== Career ==
Stoltenberg began her career with an internship in the Helgeland region before working as a registrar at Rikshospitalet University Hospital, and later in casualty departments in both Aurskog-Høland and Oslo.

She was affiliated to the FAFO study of living conditions in Gaza, the West Bank and Jerusalem. Later, she took part in a mission for ECON concerning biotechnology at the turn of the millennium.

For her doctoral thesis, Stoltenberg studied infant death, social inequality and consanguineous marriage in immigrant groups. She was a visiting scholar at Columbia University before being employed at the Norwegian Institute of Public Health in 2001. Since 2002, Stoltenberg has held various posts at the institute; Director of the Epidemiology division, Assistant Director-General and now Director-General.

Stoltenberg has a crucial role in the National Health Registry Project. The project aims to modernise the health registries in Norway. Stoltenberg was also the leader of the national FUGE platform, Biobanks for Health, and is now co-chair of Biobank Norway, a national infrastructure for research biobanks. She has had core functions in the Norwegian Mother and Child Cohort (MoBa) study since 2001, and is leading the Norwegian part of the Autism Birth Cohort study. Her research focuses on causes and risk factors for autism and other neurodevelopmental disorders.

From 2020 to 2021, Stoltenberg – following an appointment by the World Health Organization's Regional Office for Europe – served on the scientific advisory board to the Pan-European Commission on Health and Sustainable Development, chaired by Mario Monti. In the preparations for the Global Health Summit hosted by the European Commission and the G20 in May 2021, she was a member of the event's High Level Scientific Panel.

In April 2023, it was announced that Stoltenberg would become the new director of the Norwegian Research Centre (NORCE) and would assume office on 1 October.

=== Jon Sudbø case ===
Stoltenberg played an important role in uncovering that a medical article submitted by Jon Sudbø to the Lancet was an academic fraud.

== Other activities ==
- The Lancet Public Health, Member of the Editorial Advisory Board (since 2016)

== Personal life ==
Stoltenberg is the daughter of Thorvald and Karin Stoltenberg and the sister of Jens Stoltenberg and Nini Stoltenberg.
