= Anker Jørgensen =

Danish politician (1922–2016)

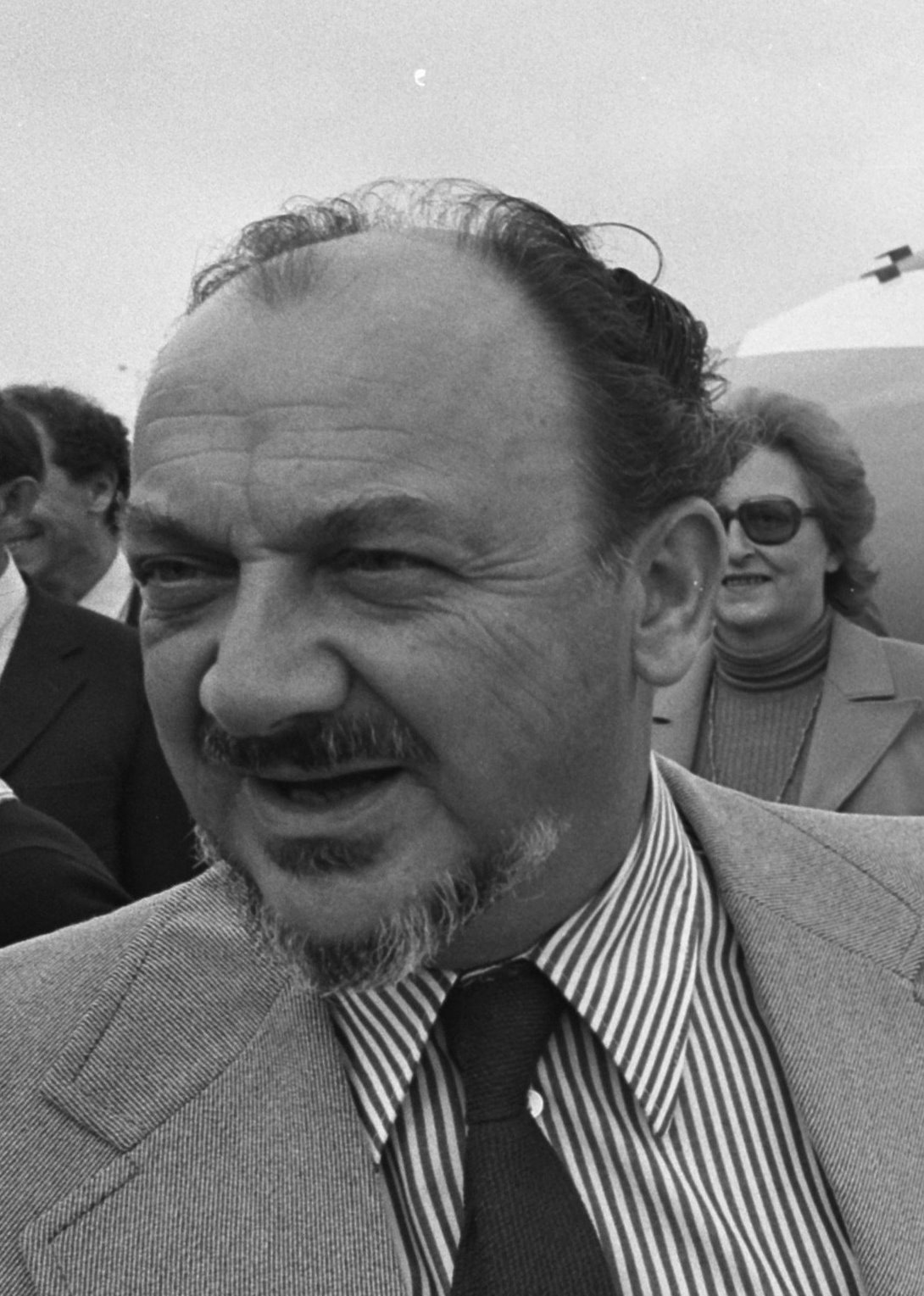
- Jørgensen in 1975

Prime Minister of Denmark
- In office 5 October 1972 – 19 December 1973
- Monarch: Margrethe II
- Preceded by: Jens Otto Krag
- Succeeded by: Poul Hartling
- In office 13 February 1975 – 10 September 1982
- Monarch: Margrethe II
- Preceded by: Poul Hartling
- Succeeded by: Poul Schlüter

President of the Nordic Council
- In office 1 January 1986 – 31 December 1986
- Preceded by: Páll Pétursson
- Succeeded by: Elsi Hetemäki-Olander
- In office 1 January 1991 – 31 December 1991
- Preceded by: Páll Pétursson
- Succeeded by: Ilkka Suominen

Minister of Foreign Affairs
- In office 1 July 1978 – 30 August 1978
- Prime Minister: Himself
- Preceded by: K. B. Andersen
- Succeeded by: Henning Christophersen

Personal details
- Born: Anker Henrik Jørgensen; 13 July 1922 Copenhagen, Denmark
- Died: 20 March 2016 (aged 93) Copenhagen, Denmark
- Party: Social Democrats
- Spouse: Ingrid Pedersen (m. 1948; died 1997)
- Children: 4

Military service
- Allegiance: Denmark
- Branch/service: Royal Danish Army
- Years of service: 1943
- Unit: Guard Hussar Regiment
- Battles/wars: World War II: Operation Safari (POW)

Anker Henrik Jørgensen (13 July 1922 – 20 March 2016) was a Danish politician who served at various times as prime minister and foreign minister of Denmark. Between 1972 and 1982 he led five cabinets as prime minister. Jørgensen was president of the Nordic Council in 1986 and 1991.

He led or represented the Social Democratic Party for well over 30 years. His legacy is ambivalent. Politically, he is considered by many right wing followers to have been largely unsuccessful, having failed to mitigate the impact of the economic crisis of the 1970s and 1980s. Nonetheless, he is generally respected and even loved throughout Denmark for his personal integrity and down-to-earth personality, often exemplified by his refusal to move into the official prime minister residence Marienborg, preferring to stay with his wife in their small apartment in a working class area of Copenhagen.

While he has been described as not having the image of a strong or visionary leader, during his terms as prime minister he managed to maintain wide support for the Danish welfare state. In 1990, he was chosen to travel to Iraq to negotiate the release of a group of Danish hostages with Saddam Hussein.

== Background ==
Anker Henrik Jørgensen was born on 13 July 1922 to Johannes Albert Jørgensen and Maria Jørgensen, who both died of tuberculosis while he was a child. He was brought up by close members of his family. He studied at the Royal Orphanage School, but left after the 7th grade to work at a warehouse. Through his job as a warehouse worker he became active in the Special Workers' Union, from January 2005 merged into Fagligt Fælles Forbund, and in the Social Democratic party.

He served his conscription period in 1943, at the Guard Hussar Regiment Mounted Squadron in Næstved. He was part of the fighting when the barracks was attacked by the Germans during Operation Safari. After being repatriated, Anker Jørgensen then joined the resistance in Copenhagen.

== Political career ==
=== Early politics ===
He began his political career early, and in 1950 he became a member of a trade union. He led the Danish General Workers' Union between 1968 and 1972. Whilst he was chairman of the union, he was elected to the Parliament of Denmark for the first of many times in 1964. As a representative of unskilled workers, a rivalry developed with the leadership of the skilled workers' unions, such as the Danish Confederation of Trade Unions (LO), and its leader Thomas Nielsen, who referred to Jørgensen as "a complete idiot".

As a member of parliament, he was responsible for labour-related issues. He located himself on the left wing of the Social Democratic party, speaking out for unskilled workers and the jobless, and criticised the leadership of Parliamentary group leader Per Hækkerup. He also gained attention for his vocal critique of American engagement in Vietnam. Before the 1972 referendum about whether Denmark should join the European Economic Community (ECC), he went against the stated interest of his own labour union, arguing for a yes.

=== Prime minister ===
A day after the EEC referendum, Jørgensen succeeded Jens Otto Krag as Prime Minister of Denmark. He held this position for 14 months until the 1973 election when he was succeeded by liberal Poul Hartling.

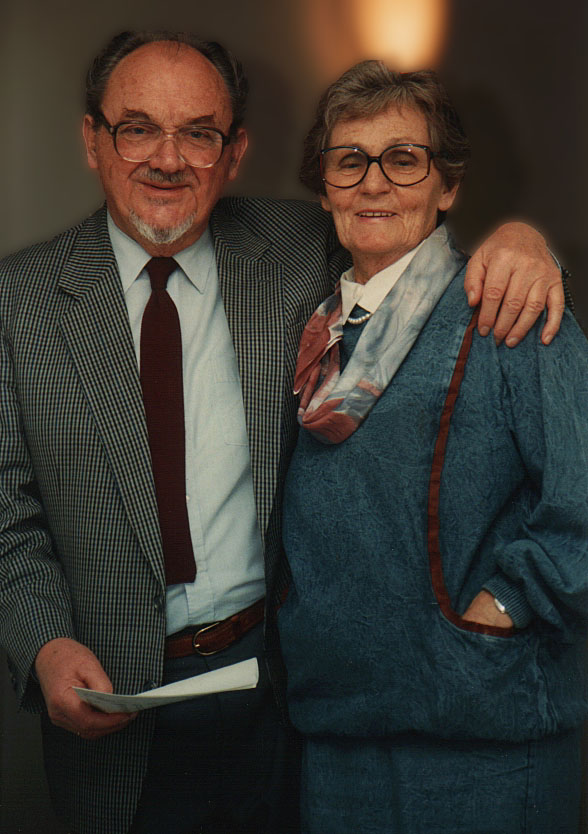
Ingrid and Anker Jørgensen, 1990

After just over a year in opposition, he returned as prime minister with a Social Democratic minority government. In 1978, he expanded the government by including the Liberals in a grand coalition government in order to deal with economic issues. This coalition lasted until 23 October 1979, and for a brief period of two months in 1978 he concurrently held the position of foreign minister. During this time, Jørgensen presided over the electoral age referendum.

For the rest of his period in office, he led a Social Democrat minority government. Unable to muster support for tax increases and spending cuts, he stepped down as prime minister without calling an election on 10 September 1982, ceding the premiership to the Conservative leader Poul Schlüter. He did, however, remain as leader of the Social Democrats until his resignation in 1987 when he was succeeded by Svend Auken. He remained as a member of parliament until 1994.

Throughout his time in office, he showed strong leadership - guiding Denmark into the EEC and further developing Denmark's social and welfare systems - but his policies also created a huge state budget deficit, which was compensated for by large state loans, increasing the Danish state debt substantially. Numerous cuts were introduced to counteract this.

Nevertheless, a wide range of progressive social reforms were introduced during Jørgensen's time as prime minister. A new Social Assistance Act introduced in 1975 simplified administration, provided new types and (in general) substantially higher benefits, together with new criteria for granting benefits. The New Basic Education Act of June 1975 introduced 9-year general, basic education with optional 10th year and pre-school class, and also established the comprehensive principle for basic education. The National Holiday Act of April 1979 extended the obligatory number of holidays to 30 days. Under the law on entitlement to unemployment benefits of June 1976, the permanently self-employed became entitled to membership in unemployment funds, and consequently to unemployment benefits. The Severance Pay Act of November 1978 introduced pre-retirement remuneration which provided unemployment benefits (for those between the ages of 58 and 66) in cases of voluntary retirement. Under the Job Offer Scheme introduced in June 1980, unemployment benefit entitlement for long-term unemployed persons could not be lost without an offer of a new job. A March 1975 law on regulation of housing conditions improved tenant conditions, while the Work Injury Insurance Act of March 1978 provided equality for widows and widowers.

=== Later ventures ===
He was President of the Nordic Council in 1986 and 1991, and was also head of the Danish delegation to the council during the same terms.

Jørgensen was elected "Dane Of The Year" in 1990 in a survey conducted by Danish Gallup for Berlingske Tidende.

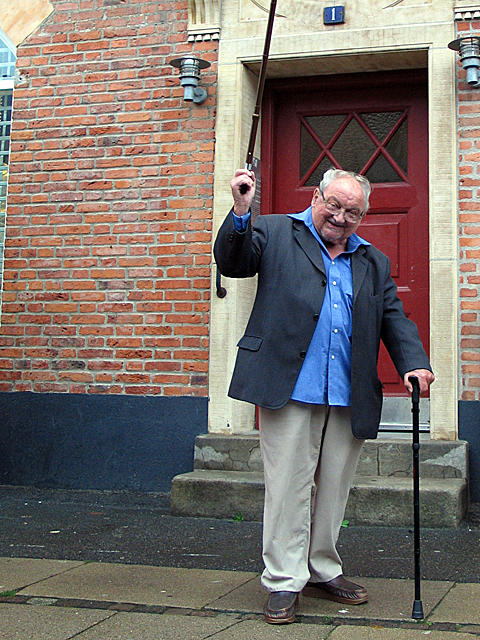
Anker Jørgensen leaving the place of his residence for 49 years, the Copenhagen working class district Sydhavnen (South Harbour).

He was an Honorary President of the Socialist International.

He died on 20 March 2016, aged 93 after suffering natural causes in Copenhagen. His funeral was held on 2 April 2016.

== Personal life ==
In 1948, he married Ingrid Kvist Pedersen (17 August 1922 – 18 October 1997) to whom he remained married until her death from motor neuron disease. They had 4 children. Throughout this period, he lived in the working-class area of Sydhavnen, an inner city district of Copenhagen. In 2008, 86 years old, he finally left the Sydhavnen apartment, moving to an elderly care centre.

== Awards ==
- 1970 Poul Henningsen prize, PH-prisen
- 1974 Received the Mathildepris by the Danish Women's Association
- 1991 Received the Drassows Legat
- 1993 Received the Jytte-prize
- 1994 Received the Cultural prize by the Danish Confederation of Trade Unions
- 2007 Tribute album De største er de små - sange til Anker [The Small Ones are the Greatest – Songs for Anker] by various artists.
- 2007 Honorary member of the Social Democratic Youth of Denmark

== Bibliography ==
- Fra mine dagbøger, 1989–1990. ISBN 87-557-1543-5 og ISBN 87-557-1544-3
  1. 1972-1975: Bølgegang
  2. 1975-1977: I smult vande
  3. 1978-1982: Brændingen
- Fra Christianshavn til Christiansborg : erindringer 1922-1972 / Anker Jørgensen, Fremad, 1994. ISBN 87-557-1832-9

Political offices
Preceded by Jens Otto Krag	Prime Minister of Denmark; 5 October 1972 – 19 December 1973	Succeeded by Poul Hartling
Preceded by Poul Hartling	Prime Minister of Denmark; 13 February 1975 – 10 September 1982	Succeeded by Poul Schlüter
Preceded by Knud Børge Andersen	Foreign Minister of Denmark; 1 July 1978 – 30 August 1978	Succeeded by Henning Christophersen
Party political offices
Preceded by Jens Otto Krag	Leader of the Danish Social Democrats; 1972 – 1987	Succeeded by Svend Auken
Trade union offices
Preceded by Viggo Wivel	President of the Danish General Workers' Union; 1968–1972	Succeeded by Ejler Sønder
