= Sven Mollekleiv =

Norwegian organisational leader

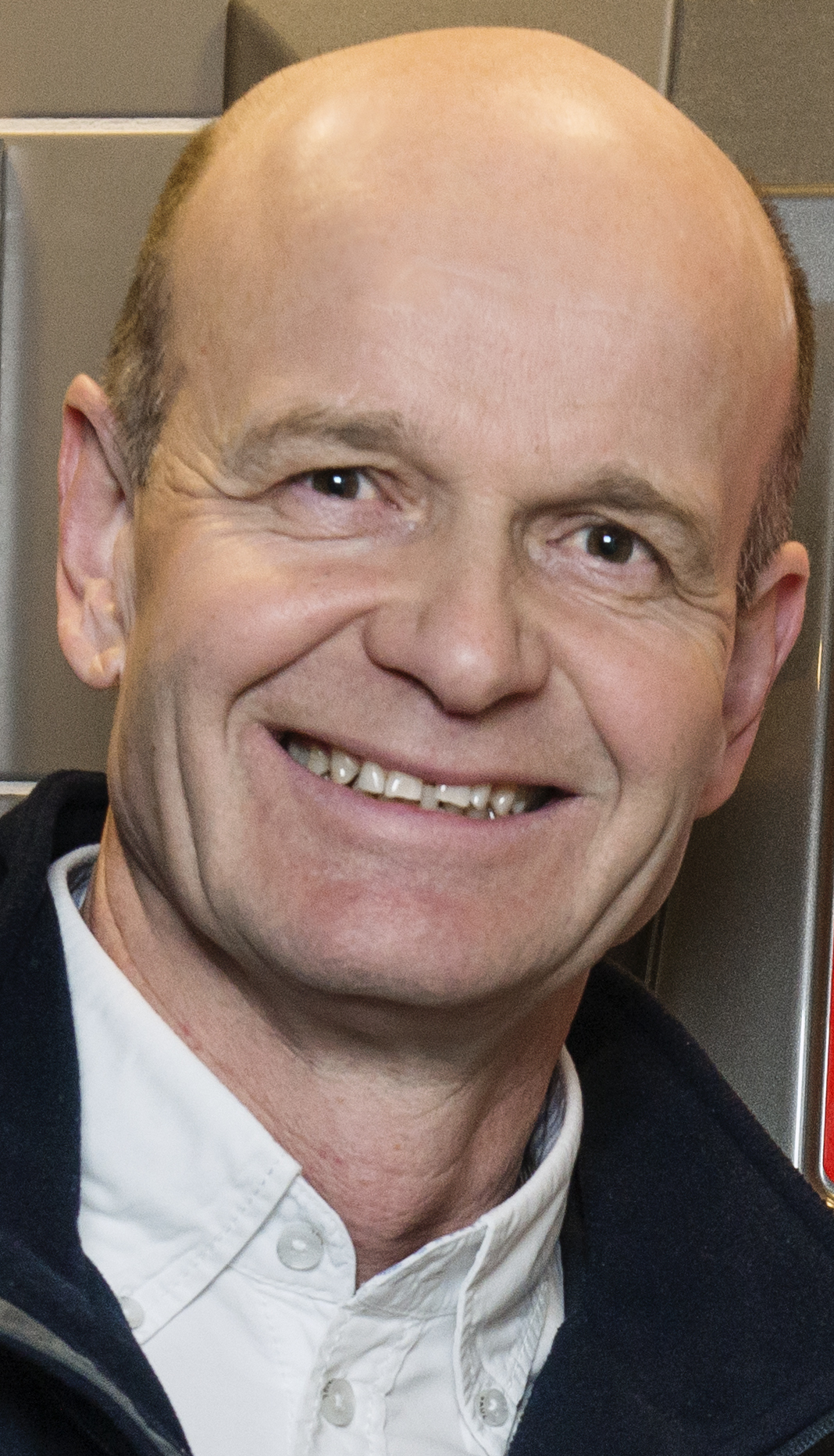
Sven Mollekleiv

Sven Mollekleiv (born 2 March 1956) is a Norwegian organisational leader and Honorary President of the Norwegian Red Cross. He served as Secretary General of the Norwegian Red Cross from 1991 to 2001 and President on a voluntary basis from October 2008 to October 2017.

== Background and education ==
Sven Mollekleiv was born in Bergen in Norway, but grew up in Oslo. After finishing upper secondary school in Oslo, Mollekleiv continued with further studies at Norwegian School of Sport Sciences where he was awarded a master's degree.

While a student, Sven Mollekleiv chaired the Norwegian Student Union, where he later also worked as an editor. Sven Mollekleiv is married and lives in Oslo with three daughters.

== Career ==
After his studies Mollekleiv was appointed Deputy for Principal – Norwegian University of Sports while also working as Education/Media Consultant at the Norwegian Confederation of Sports. Over the following decade, Mr Mollekleiv was Director of Information and, then, Assistant Secretary General / Development Manager, Norwegian Confederation of Sport before assuming the post of Director of Marketing- and PR at the Norwegian Football Association.

In 1991 Mr Mollekleiv was appointed Secretary General of the Norwegian Red Cross, where he worked with expanding and strengthening the organization. Following ten years of professional service to the Red Cross, Sven Mollekleiv in 2001 accepted a position as Director of Human Resources at Det Norske Veritas AS, a global Norwegian Ship Classification agency, where is presently Senior Vice President for Sustainability, while continuing to serve in his National Society as volunteer – both in governance and at the grass-roots, and – in 2016 - still President.

Mollekleiv has also been the chairman of Vålerenga Fotball, and has been a board member of Amnesty International Norway and chairman of the Association of NGOs in Norway, and has served in a variety of other appointed and elected offices in the public as well as the NGO sectors.

== Red Cross ==
During his ten years as secretary General of the Norwegian Red Cross, Mollekleiv oversaw a rapid expansion and strengthening of the domestic activities of the Norwegian Red Cross with special emphasis on volunteers, volunteer development, and the involvement of volunteers in both governance and day-to-day decision-making in the organisation. During his tenure, the Norwegian Red Cross saw a large increase in its international engagement and substantial growth in support for the International Red Cross and Red Crescent.

In 2008 Mollekleiv was elected President of the Norwegian Red Cross a position he has had since then as a volunteer. As president Mollekleiv has been a national spokesperson for international humanitarian matters, and continued his large emphasis on volunteers and the development of volunteers in the Norwegian Red Cross.

Outside the Norwegian Red Cross, Sven Mollekleiv is Vice Chair of the ICRC's Special Fund for Disabled, and serves on the Ethics Committee of the Norwegian Football Association as well as that of the Norwegian Association of Local and Regional Authorities.

== Honors ==
Mollekleiv was decorated Knight, First Class of the Order of St. Olav in 2015.

Non-profit organization positions
Preceded by Odd Grann	Secretary General of the Norwegian Red Cross; 1991–2001	Succeeded by Jan Egeland
