= Thorvald Stoltenberg =

Norwegian politician and diplomat (1931–2018)

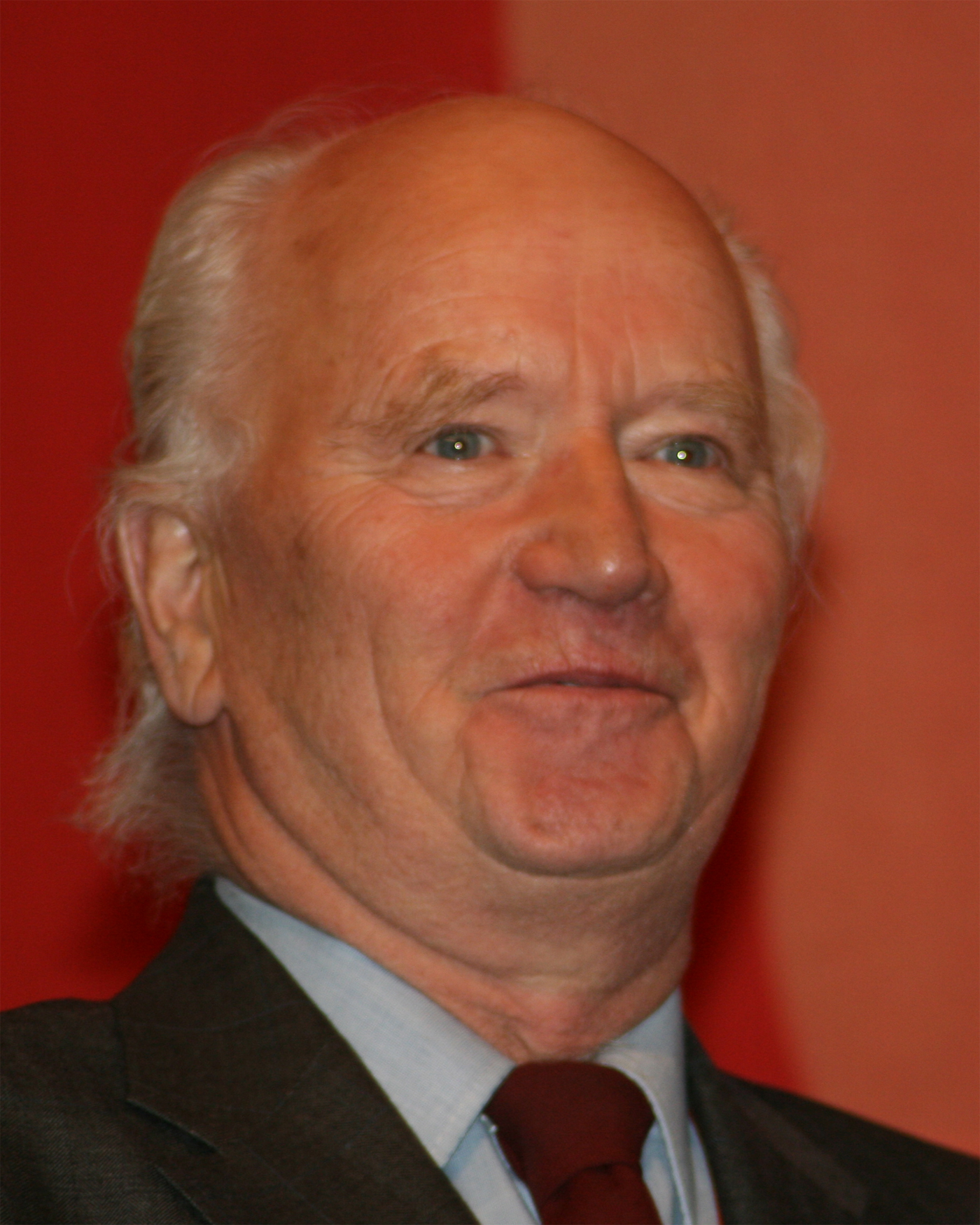
- Stoltenberg in 2009

Minister of Foreign Affairs
- In office 3 November 1990 – 2 April 1993
- Prime Minister: Gro Harlem Brundtland
- Preceded by: Kjell Magne Bondevik
- Succeeded by: Johan Jørgen Holst
- In office 9 March 1987 – 16 October 1989
- Prime Minister: Gro Harlem Brundtland
- Preceded by: Knut Frydenlund
- Succeeded by: Kjell Magne Bondevik

Minister of Defence
- In office 8 October 1979 – 14 October 1981
- Prime Minister: Odvar Nordli; Gro Harlem Brundtland
- Preceded by: Rolf A. Hansen
- Succeeded by: Anders Sjaastad

United Nations High Commissioner for Refugees
- In office 1 January 1990 – 3 November 1990
- Preceded by: Jean-Pierre Hocké
- Succeeded by: Sadako Ogata

President of the Norwegian Red Cross
- In office 1999–2008
- Preceded by: Astrid Nøklebye Heiberg
- Succeeded by: Sven Mollekleiv

Norwegian Ambassador to the United Nations
- In office 1989–1990
- Preceded by: Tom Vraalsen
- Succeeded by: Martin Huslid

Personal details
- Born: 8 July 1931 Oslo, Norway
- Died: 13 July 2018 (aged 87) Oslo, Norway
- Party: Labour
- Spouse: Karin Heiberg
- Children: Camilla; Jens; Nini

Thorvald Stoltenberg (8 July 1931 – 13 July 2018) was a Norwegian politician and diplomat. He served as Minister of Defence from 1979 to 1981 and Minister of Foreign Affairs from 1987 to 1989 and again from 1990 to 1993 in two Labour governments.

From 1989 to 1990, Stoltenberg served as the Norwegian ambassador to the United Nations. In 1990, he became the United Nations High Commissioner for Refugees, serving for one year after which he rejoined the Norwegian government. In 1992, Stoltenberg, together with nine Baltic ministers of foreign affairs and an EU commissioner, founded the Council of the Baltic Sea States (CBSS) and the EuroFaculty. In 1993, he was appointed Special Representative of the UN Secretary-General for the former Yugoslavia and U.N. Co-Chairman of the Steering Committee of the International Conference on the former Yugoslavia. Thorvald Stoltenberg was also the UN witness at the signing of Erdut Agreement.

In 2003 he was appointed chairman of the board of the International Institute for Democracy and Electoral Assistance (International IDEA). Between 1999 and 2008, he was President of the Norwegian Red Cross, the only president to serve three terms. He was also a member of the Trilateral Commission, and held a seat on their executive committee.

At the local level, Stoltenberg was elected to the Oslo City Council in 2015.

== Youth ==
Stoltenberg was born in Oslo, the son of Ingeborg (b. Andresen, 1905-1993) and Theodor Emil Stoltenberg (1900-1998). In his mid-20s, Stoltenberg became heavily involved in the organization of Hungarian refugees fleeing the invading Soviet Army in 1956. While evacuating refugees by boat in the middle of the night, he jumped into the strong currents, risking his own life to save one of the boats. One of the other rescuers, American journalist Barry Farber described witnessing the incident in December 2006 on the Norwegian talk-show Først & sist.

== Special Representative of the Secretary-General (SRSG) ==
"[In] May 1993, the UN's co-chair at the International Conference on the former Yugoslavia, Th. Stoltenberg was appointed Special Representative of the Secretary-General (SRSG). As such, he acted as head of the UN mission in the former Yugoslavia and served as the first point of contact for the Department of Peacekeeping Operations in New York. All contacts between UNPROFOR in Zagreb and the UN in New York had to run via his office (...) Mr Stoltenberg was responsible for the coordination of all UNPROFOR operations, which also entailed assessments of the political implications of operational decisions as well as the actions of the conflicting parties. In practice, this combination of tasks was impossible to juggle. A serious conflict is said to have occurred between Thorvald Stoltenberg and General Wahlgren's successor, General J. Cot of France".

Cot disagreed with Stoltenberg about the latter's role as SRSG, and at the end of 1993 the two tasks were again split up. Stoltenberg stayed on as co-chair of the peace negotiations in Geneva on behalf of the UN, and on 1 January 1994 the Japanese diplomat Y. Akashi was appointed SRSG responsible for all UNPROFOR operations in the former Yugoslavia. It was he who negotiated with the authorities of the conflicting parties.

== Political views ==
=== Lobbying for changes in drug policy ===
In 2010, Stoltenberg led a commission whose primary purpose was to recommend changes in Norwegian drug policy to improve the situation of hard drug addicts. The question of heroin prescription was one of the most controversial topics evaluated by the commission set up by Bjarne Håkon Hanssen. The commission concluded in June 2010 that Norway should start trials with heroin prescription, in addition to making several other changes to its drug policy. He also joined an international campaign for a less punitive drug policy, the Global Commission on Drug Policy, consisting of, among others, former Latin American leaders.

=== Sanctions against Israel ===
In 2010, together with 25 other statesmen, Stoltenberg sent a letter to EU leaders and the heads of government of the EU countries, demanding sanctions against Israel for its violations of international law. His co-signatories included Javier Solana, Felipe González, Romano Prodi, Lionel Jospin and Mary Robinson.

== Personal life ==
He married Karin Heiberg (1931–2012) in 1955. Their son, Jens Stoltenberg (born 1959), followed him into politics and served as Prime Minister of Norway from 2000 to 2001 and from 2005 to 2013, and as NATO Secretary-General from 2014 to 2024. They also had two daughters, Camilla (born 1958), a medical researcher and administrator, and Nini (1963–2014) whose heroin addiction has been much publicized.

He was in a relationship with film director Anja Breien before he died.

Stoltenberg died on 13 July 2018 at the age of 87 after a short illness.

Political offices
| Preceded by Rolf Arthur Hansen | Minister of Defence; 1979–1981 | Succeeded by Anders Sjaastad |
| Preceded by Knut Frydenlund | Minister of Foreign Affairs; 1987–1989 | Succeeded by Kjell Magne Bondevik |
| Preceded by Kjell Magne Bondevik | Minister of Foreign Affairs; 1990–1993 | Succeeded by Johan Jørgen Holst |
Diplomatic posts
| Preceded by Tom Vraalsen | Ambassador of Norway to the United Nations; 1989–1990 | Succeeded by Martin Huslid |
| Preceded by Jean-Pierre Hocké | United Nations High Commissioner for Refugees; 1990–1990 | Succeeded by Sadako Ogata |
Non-profit organization positions
| Preceded by Astrid Nøklebye Heiberg | President of the Norwegian Red Cross; 1999–2008 | Succeeded by Sven Mollekleiv |
