= Peder Balke =

Norwegian painter (1804–1887)

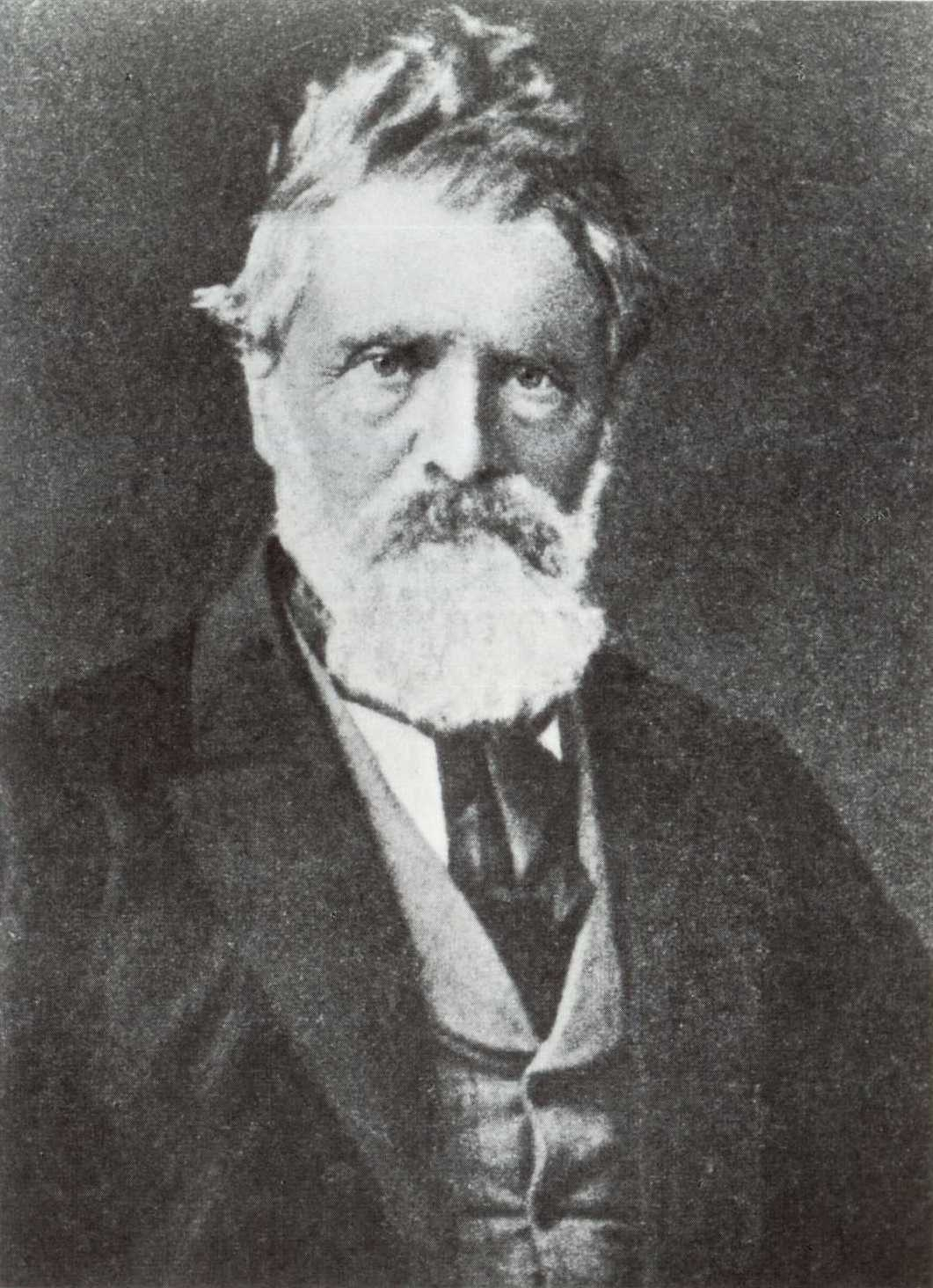
- Detail from a photograph by Ludwik Szaciński (1844–1894)
- Born: Peder Andersen; November 4, 1804; Helgøya, Norway
- Died: February 5, 1887 (aged 82); Christiania
- Education: Royal Swedish Academy of Arts
- Known for: Painting

Peder Balke (November 4, 1804 – February 5, 1887) was a Norwegian painter. He is known for portraying the landscape of Norway in a romantic and dramatic manner.

== Biography ==
Peder Andersen was born on the island of Helgøya, in Hedmark county, Norway. He was the son of Anders Thoresen and Pernille Pedersdatter. He grew up in Ringsaker, but lived in the 1820s on the Balke farm in Østre Toten in Oppland county. Farmers in Toten paid for his education, and he decorated several farms in Toten in return. They actively encouraged his painting activities and later supported him in obtaining higher education.

In the autumn of 1827, Balke served as an apprentice to engraver and painter Heinrich August Grosch (1763–1843). He was also a student at the Tegneskole under Grosch and Jacob Munch. Balke signed a two-year contract as an apprentice to the Danish decorator and artist Jens Funch. From autumn 1829 to spring 1833, he was a pupil of Carl Johan Fahlcrantz at the Royal Swedish Academy of Fine Arts in Stockholm. Balke was also a pupil of Johan Christian Dahl from 1843 to 1844.

During the summer of 1830 he walked from Rjukan in the Vestfjorddalen valley, through Telemark county, Røldal Municipality, Kinsarvik Municipality all the way to the city of Bergen, and then back to Rjukan through Vossevangen to Gudvangen, further over Filefjell to Valdres and then across the mountains to Hallingdal. Along the way, he painted and drew small sketches that were later developed into paintings. He also traveled to Germany, and Russia. He visited Paris and London.

In Stockholm, he completed several of the paintings he had outlined on his 1832 Finnmark tour. Some of these were sold to the royal family. In 1846 he sold thirty of his paintings to Louis Philippe I of France for the Palace of Versailles.

== Legacy ==
Besides the 17 paintings in the National Museum in Oslo, Peder Balke is also represented at several major art collections in Norway and Sweden.

The National Gallery in London organized the greatest display of his work in the UK, a collection of over 50 paintings, from public and private collections in November 2014 - April 2015.

In 2017, the Metropolitan Museum of Art exhibited Peder Balke: Painter of Northern Light featuring the beauty of Norway in 17 paintings of his paintings.

== Personal life ==
He was married in 1834 to Karen Eriksdatter Strand. He was engaged in social questions and organized the construction of Balkeby, a new part of Oslo, with improved living conditions for workers. He also advocated grants for artists and pensions for men and women. He was the great-grandfather of actress, playwright and artist Turid Balke (1921–2000) and great-great-grandfather of jazz pianist Jon Balke. He died at Christiania and was buried at Vestre Aker kirkegård.

== Balkeby ==
Peder Balke purchased parcels of the historic Nedre Blindern farm between 1858 and 1876. The Balke association organized the suburb. Plot buyers could borrow money from Balke and construct the building themselves. By 1865, there were 300 people in Balkeby and the area was relatively well populated by workers. Eventually they took in lodgers, so that the population increased.

Balkeby provided an opportunity for a population to have their own home within a reasonable distance from the city, especially after the horse trams came in 1875. In 1878, when the area was incorporated into the city of Oslo, about 1,100 people lived there. Balke had set up strict rules for construction, including the planning of wide streets to prevent the spreading of fire. However, on 13 June 1879, many of the houses in Balkeby burned to the ground.

The former Balkeby suburb was located northeast of what is today Oslo's main shopping street Bogstadveien in Majorstuen and Hegdehaugen neighbourhoods in the Frogner district of Oslo.

== Selected paintings ==
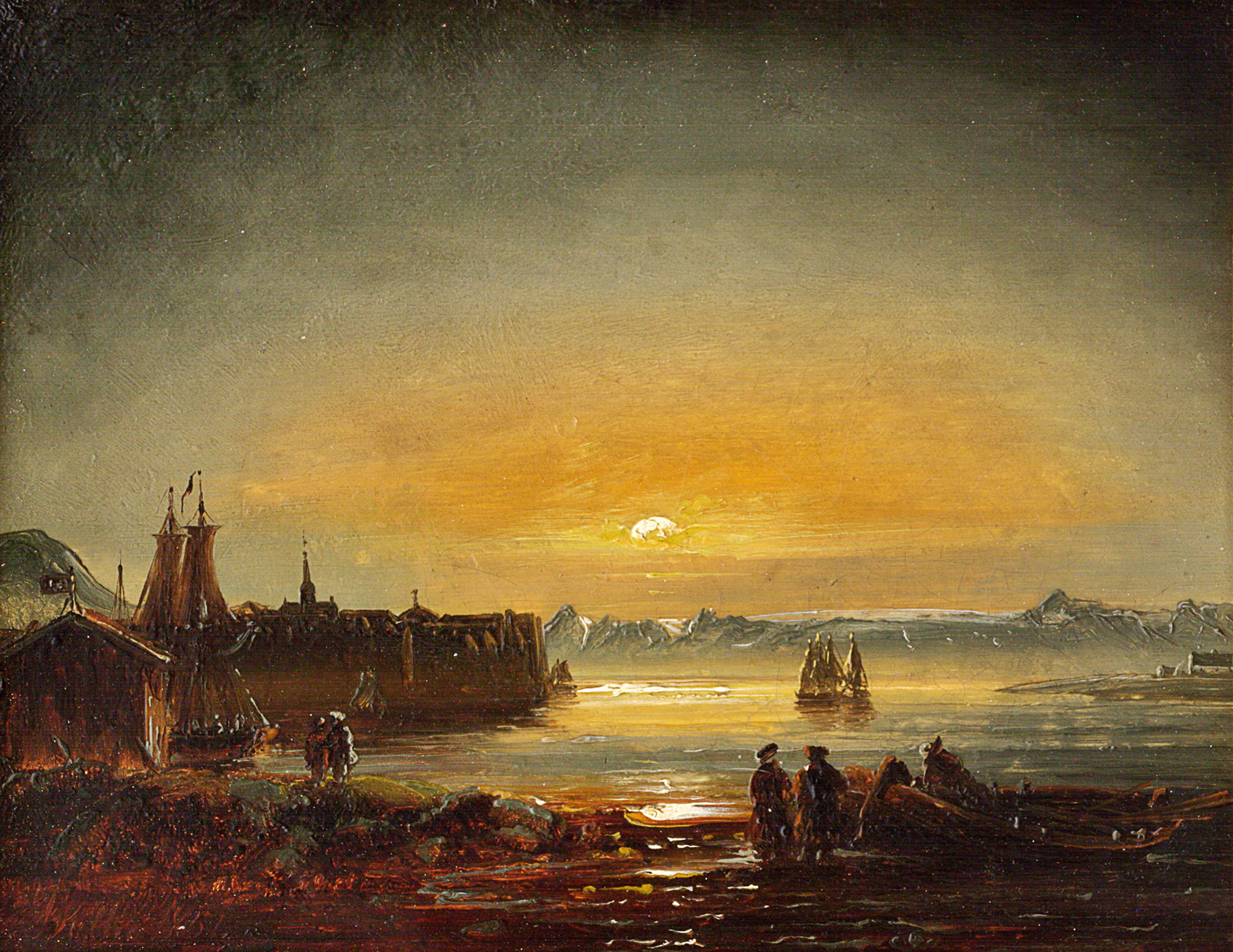
Near Hammerfest
(1851)

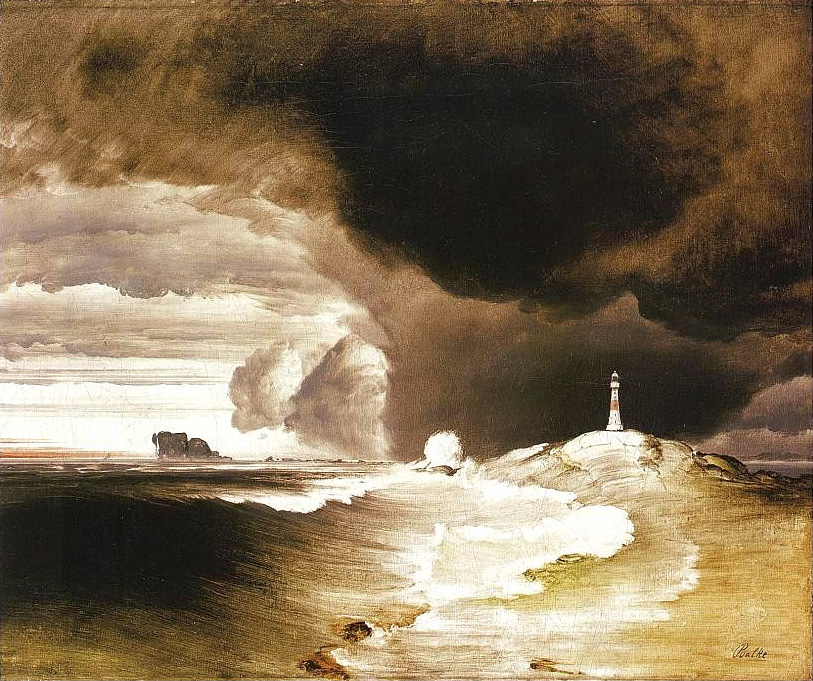
Lighthouse on the
Norwegian Coast
(ca. 1860)

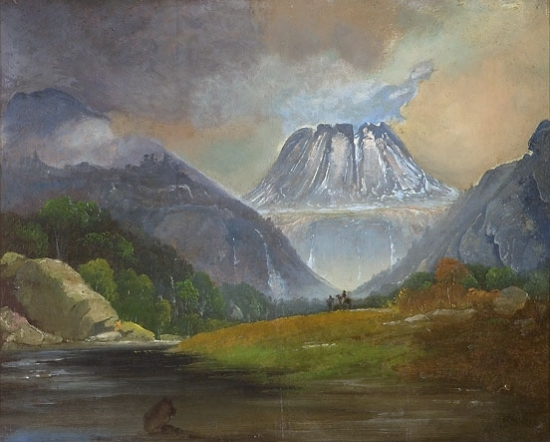
Gaustatoppen
(ca. 1858)

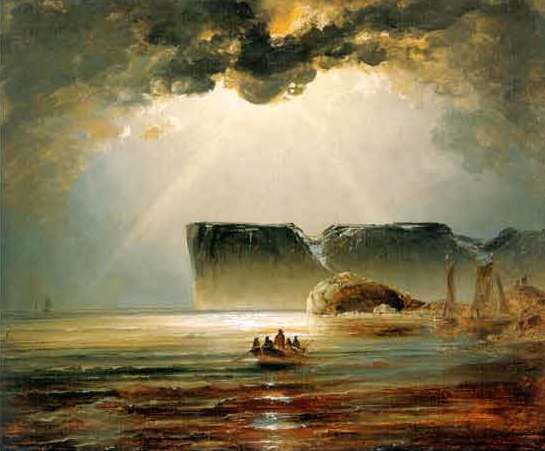
Nordkapp
(ca. 1840)

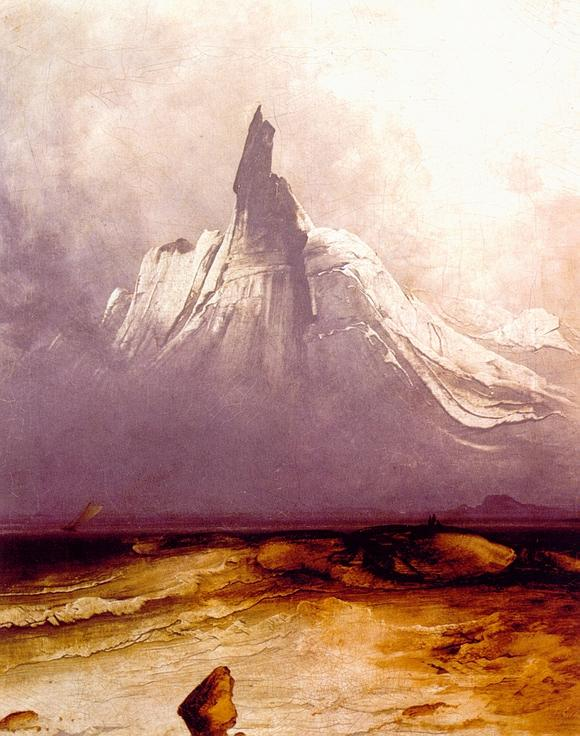
Stetind in Fog
(1864)

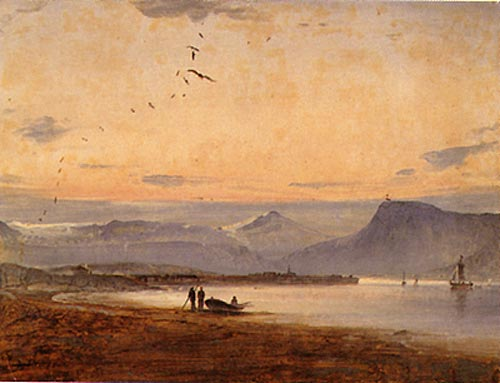
Tromsø

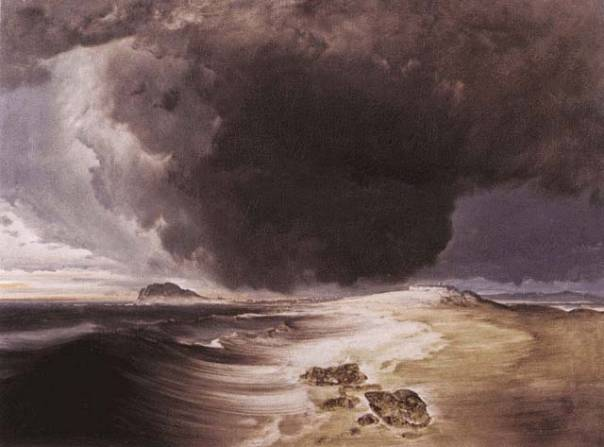
Vardøhus Fortress
(ca. 1870)

== Other sources ==
- Knut Ljøgodt (2014) Peder Balke: Visjon og Revolusjon (Tromsø: Nordnorsk kunstmuseum) ISBN 978-82-91834-55-9
- Marit Ingeborg Lange, Knut Ljøgodt, Christopher Riopelle (2015) Paintings by Peder Balke (Yale University Press) ISBN 9781857095821

== Related reading ==
- Jackson, D. (2012) Nordic Art, The Modern Breakthrough (Hirmer) ISBN 3777470813
