= Psynapse (organization) =

Norwegian nonprofit supporting access to MDMA and psychedelics

- Formation: 2015
- Type: Non-profit
- Leader: Pål-Ørjan Johansen

Psynapse (formerly known as EmmaSofia) is a nonprofit organization based in Oslo, Norway, which aims to increase access to MDMA and psychedelics for medical and scientific purposes, as well as advocating for the legalization of psychedelics for human rights reasons. Psynapse was founded in 2015 by researchers Pål-Ørjan Johansen and his wife, Teri Krebs.

== Background ==
Teri Krebs is a former research fellow at the Department of Neuroscience at the Faculty of Medicine of the Norwegian University of Science and Technology. Pål-Ørjan Johansen is a clinical psychologist who has spoken out about having self-medicated with psilocybin and MDMA to treat his PTSD and alcoholism. Both researchers are known for their studies on the use of LSD to treat alcoholism, as well as a meta-analysis of 130,000 randomly chosen people, including 22,000 people who had used LSD, peyote or psilocybin mushrooms at least once. The latter study led them to conclude that there was no link between these psychedelics and mental health problems and that in fact, they found some significant associations between the use of psychedelic drugs and fewer mental health problems.

According to Johansen, the ban on psychedelics goes against human rights as the substances are less harmful than other common activities and because psychedelics play an important role in belief, spiritual practice, personality development and leisure.
