= Andrew J. Dannenberg =

American physician and researcher

Andrew Jess Dannenberg (born February 17, 1956) is a U.S. physician and former researcher specializing in molecular mechanisms of cancer. He was formerly associated with Weill Cornell Medicine/M.D. Anderson Cancer Center.

== Academic career ==
Dannenberg received a B.S. from Tufts University in 1978 and an M.D. from the Washington University School of Medicine of Washington University in St. Louis in 1982. In 1988 Dannenberg was hired as an assistant professor of medicine in the Division of Gastroenterology and Hepatology at Weill Cornell Medicine, becoming in 2000 the Henry R. Erle, M.D. - Roberts Family Professor of Medicine, and later the associate director of Cancer Prevention at the Sandra and Edward Meyer Cancer Center. Dannenberg retired from Weill in 2021.

His research at Weill focused upon the molecular mechanisms of cancer and cancer prevention. In 2011 Dannenberg received the AACR-Prevent Cancer Foundation Award for Excellence in Cancer Prevention Research from the American Association for Cancer Research.

== Retractions ==
In 2020, the Journal of Biological Chemistry retracted nine of Dannenberg's publications due to irregularities with the papers' figures. In 2022 an additional nine papers co-authored by Dannenberg were retracted by Cancer Prevention Research due to "evidence of data falsification or fabrication." An investigatory committee at Weill produced findings that were submitted to the federal Office of Research Integrity, with a statement from Dannenberg's attorney reporting that "Dannenberg did not generate the problematic data nor prepare the figures necessitating retraction of any of the nine articles."

As of 2023, Dannenberg has had 20 of his research publications retracted, and two others have received an expression of concern.
