= Sankt Annæ Plads 10 =

Building in Copenhagen, Denmark

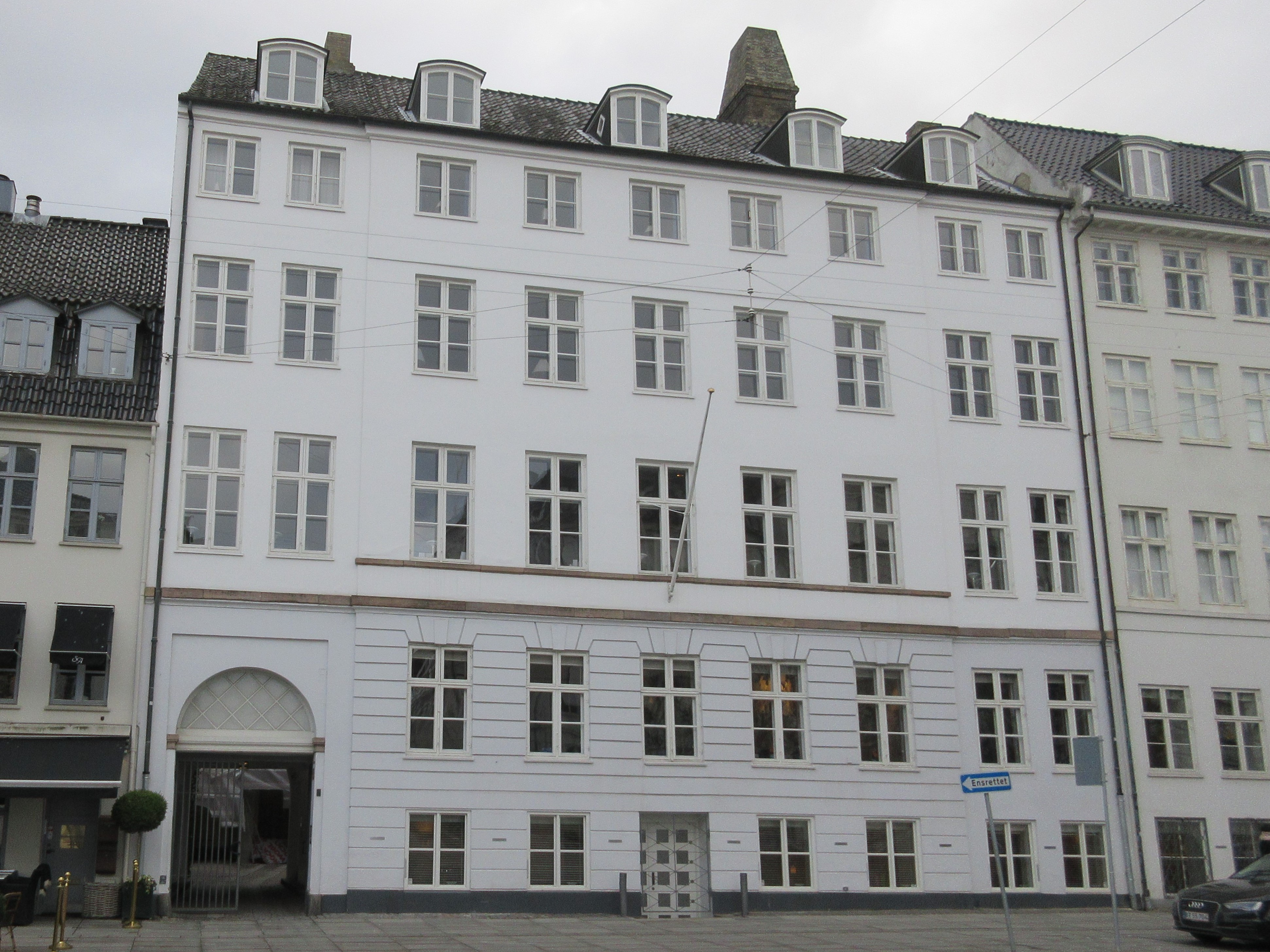
- Interactive map of the Sankt Annæ Plads 10 area

General information
- Location: Copenhagen, Denmark
- Coordinates: 55°40′53.22″N 12°35′27.71″E
- Completed: 1785
- Renovated: 1875 (heightened)

Design and construction
- Architect: Andreas Hallander

Sankt Annæ Plads 10 is a Neoclassical property situated on Sankt Annæ Plads in central Copenhagen, Denmark. The building fronting the square was together with three rear wings listed in the Danish registry of protected buildings and places in 1964.

== History ==
Sankt Annæ Plads 10 was built in 1785 by master builder Andreas Hallander (1755-1828).

One of the first tenants was the historian and writer Tyge Rothe who was among the residents from its completion in 1785 and until his death 10 years later. Other early residents were Thomasine and Peter Andreas Heiberg who lived in one of the apartments from 1792 to 1796. The theologian Christian Bastholm (1740-1819) was a resident in 1795. City architect Jørgen Henrich Rawert (1751-1823) was a resident in 1795–96. He was at the same time building the property at Sankt Annæ Plads 5 on the other side of the square to which he moved on its completion in 1796.

The painter C. W. Eckersberg (1783-1853) and the painter and mechanician Henrik Plötz (1747-1830) shared a dwelling in the building in 1816–17. Eckersberg had just returned to Denmark from a journey to France and Italy. The Italian-born opera singer Giuseppe Siboni was a resident in the building when he founded the Royal Danish Music Academy in 1827.

The goldsmith and foundry owner Jørgen Balthasar Dalhoff's workshop was from 1826 to 1841 located in one of the rear wings. His visitors included the sculptor Bertel Thorvaldsen. The diplomat and politician Holger Christian Reedtz was a resident from 1836 to 1842. The painter Viggo Johansen lived in an apartment on the first floor from 1922 to 1923.

== Architecture ==
The building fronting the street is eight bays wide and was heightened by one floor in 1865. The western side wing is from 1856. The two-storey eastern side wing—eight bays long and five storeys tall—is from 1873.

At the bottom of the small courtyard is a small single-storey exhibition building from 1875 known as Templet (The Temple). The central main entrance is flanked by ionic order pilasters. On each side is a large, arched display window.

== Gallery ==
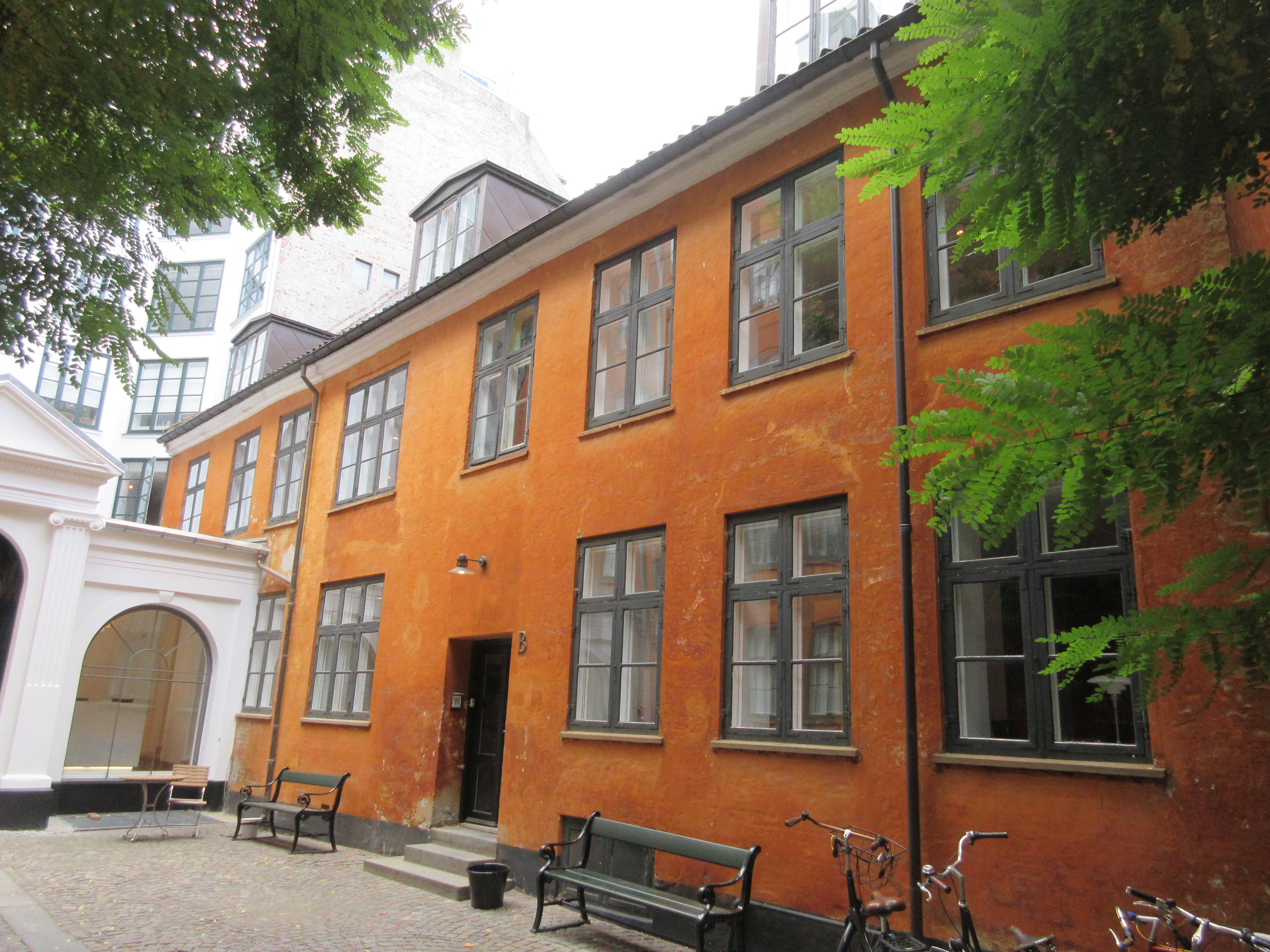
The western side wing

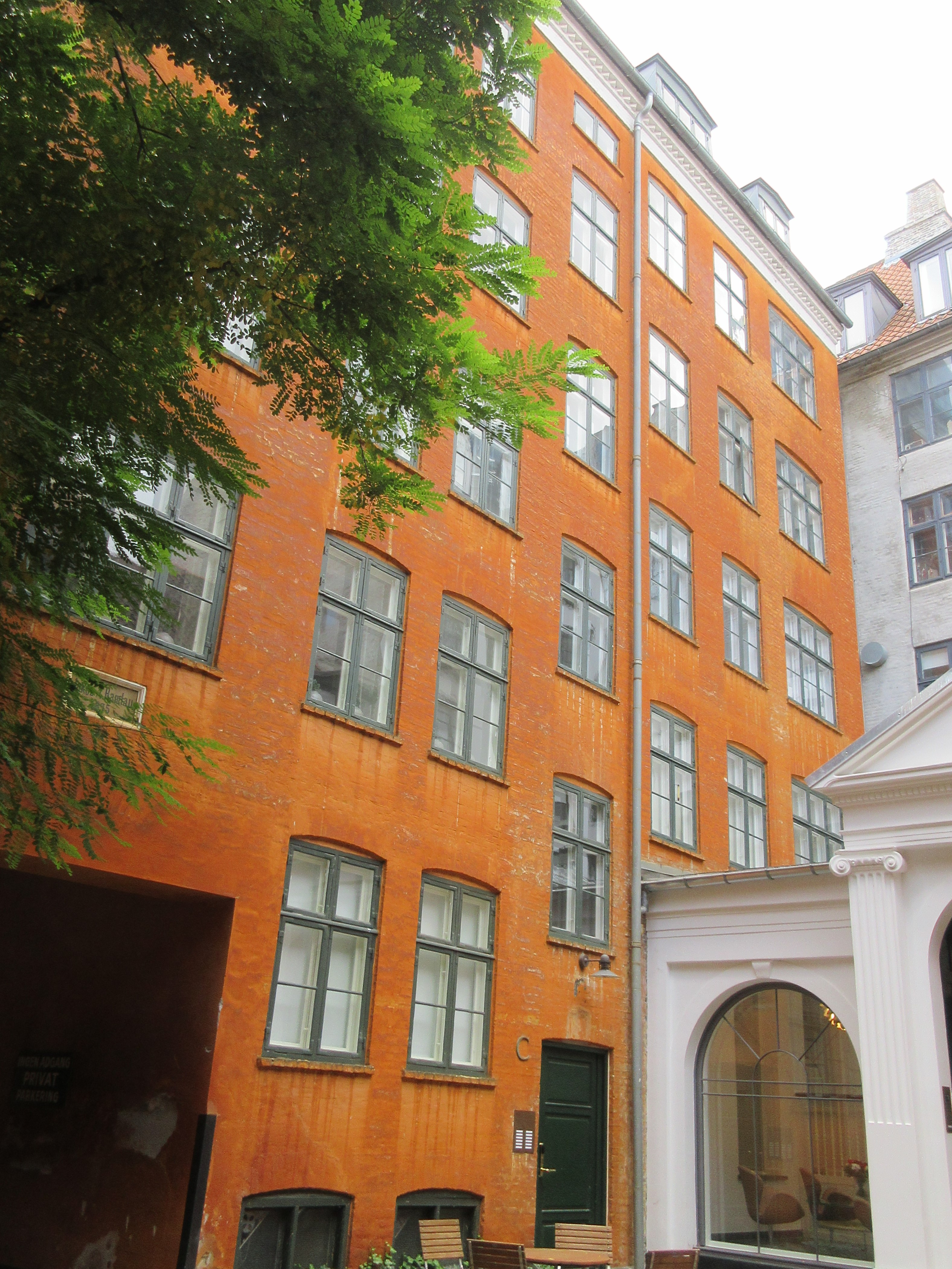
The eastern side wing

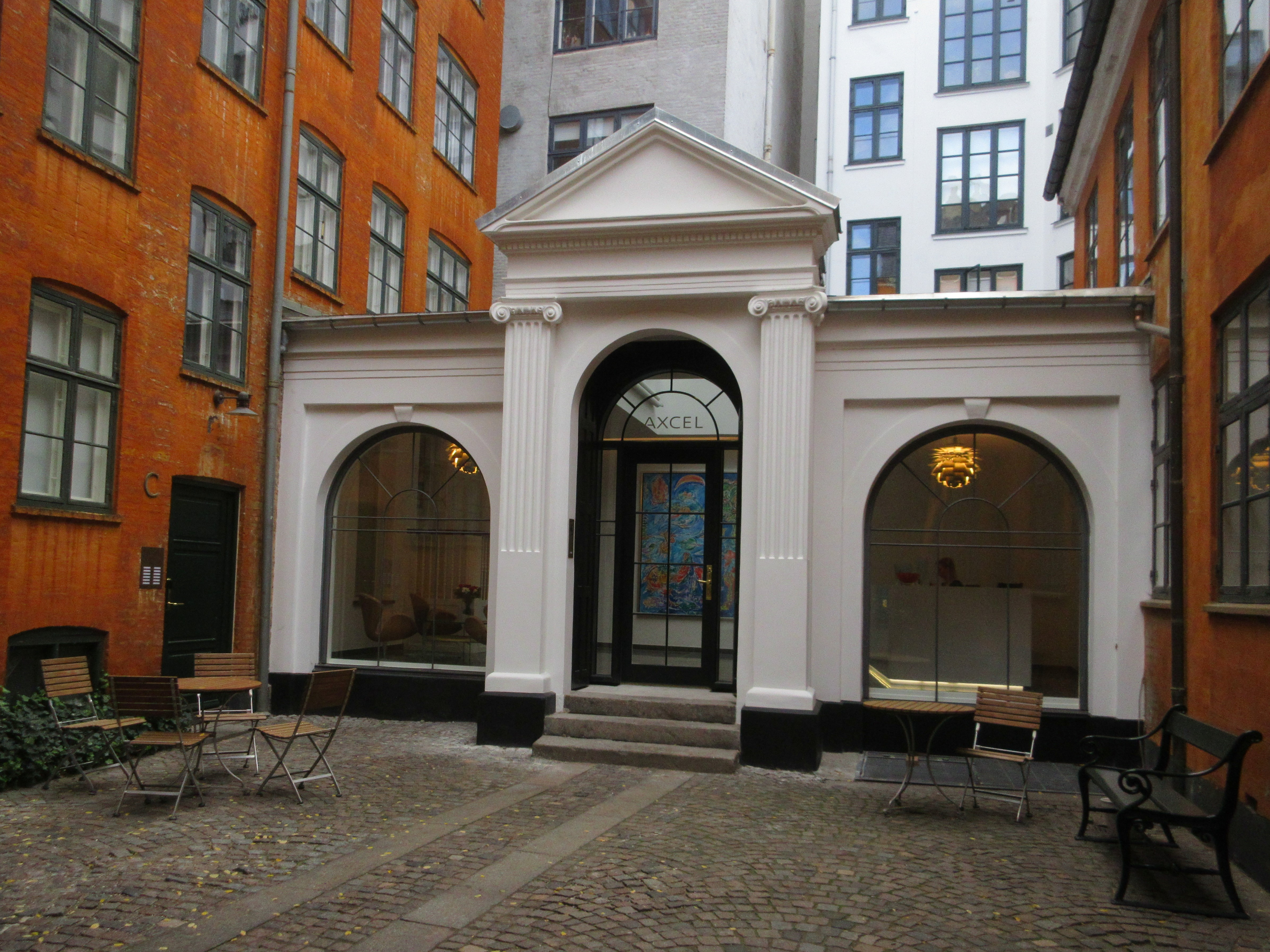
The rear wing
