= Sankt Annæ Plads 11 =

Building in Copenhagen, Denmark

Sankt Annæ Plads
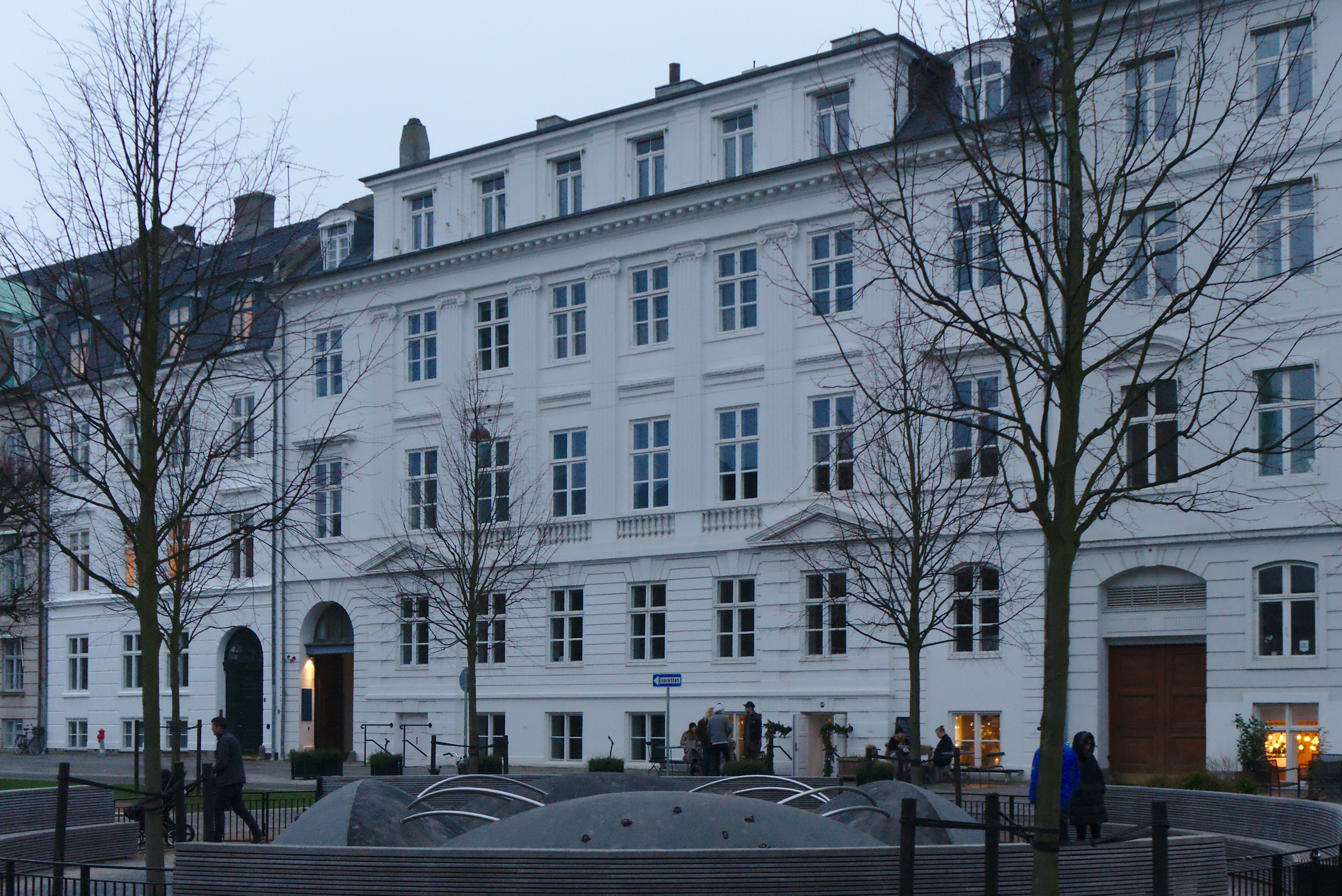
- The house seen from the other side of the canal
- Interactive map of the Sankt Annæ Plads area

General information
- Location: Copenhagen, Denmark
- Coordinates: 55°40′55.44″N 12°35′25.54″E
- Completed: 1801

Design and construction
- Architect: Jørgen Henrich Rawert

Sankt Annæ Plads 11 is a Neoclassical property located on the north side of Sankt Annæ Plads in central Copenhagen, Denmark. It was built in 1801 to a design by city architect Jørgen Henrich Rawert and was listed on the Danish Registry of Protected Buildings and Places in 1918. Bruun & Stengade, a fashion brand, is based on the third floor.

== History ==
=== 18th century ===
In the new cadastre of 1756, the property was listed as No. 1756 71 R 2 in St. Ann's East Quarter (Sankt Annæ Øster Kvarter). On Christian Gedde's map of St. Ann's East Quarter, it was marked as No. 308.

=== 19th century ===
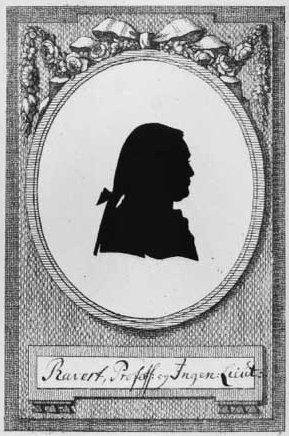
Jørgen Henrich Rawert

Sankt Annæ Plads 11 was built in 1801 by city builder Jørgen Henrich Rawert for his own use. He had already built the property at Sankt Annæ Plads 5 a few years earlier, and had lived there until 1797, when he moved to an apartment at Borgergade 25. Rewert does not seem to have moved to No. 11 after it was completed, but instead moved to Amaliegade 3 in 1802. In 1805, he seems to have briefly lived in the building at No. 11 before moving back to Borgergade 25.

In the new cadastre of 1806, the property was listed as No. 112. It was by then still owned by Rawert. The merchant and shipowner Erich Erichsen lived in the building from 1811 until his death in 1837. He had completed the more extravagant Erichsen Mansion on Kongens Nytorv in 1801, but had to move after he went bankrupt during the economic crisis that followed the war with England.

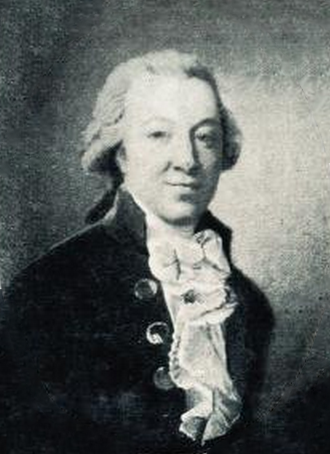
Haagen Mathiesen

At the time of the 1834 census, No. 112 was home to four households. Carl Adolph Rothe, a counter admiral, resided on the ground floor with his wife Benedichte, their seven children (aged 10 to 23), two male servants and two maids. Haagen Mathiesen, a Norwegian businessman and ship-owner, resided on the first floor with his "housekeeper" and de facto spouse Anne Bue (1783–1853) and two of their four children. One of the children, Louise, aged 19, would some 30 years later marry a future owner of the property. Another daughter, Julie, lived there with her husband Isaac Pierre Larpent (a medical doctor) and their two children (aged one and two). Adolph Callisen, a military surgeon and professor of medicine, resided on the second floor with his wife Julie Callisen (née From), their six children (aged 11 to 19), a governess, a male servant and two maids. Jørgen Rasmusen, a ship furnishings retailer, resided in the basement with his wife Magrethe Rasmusen and their two children (aged 14 and 21). Peter Jürgen Pohlmann, a 39-year-old shoemaker, resided in the building with his wife Ana Maria Pohlmann, a 24-year-old foster son, a nine-year-old nephew and a six-year-old niece.

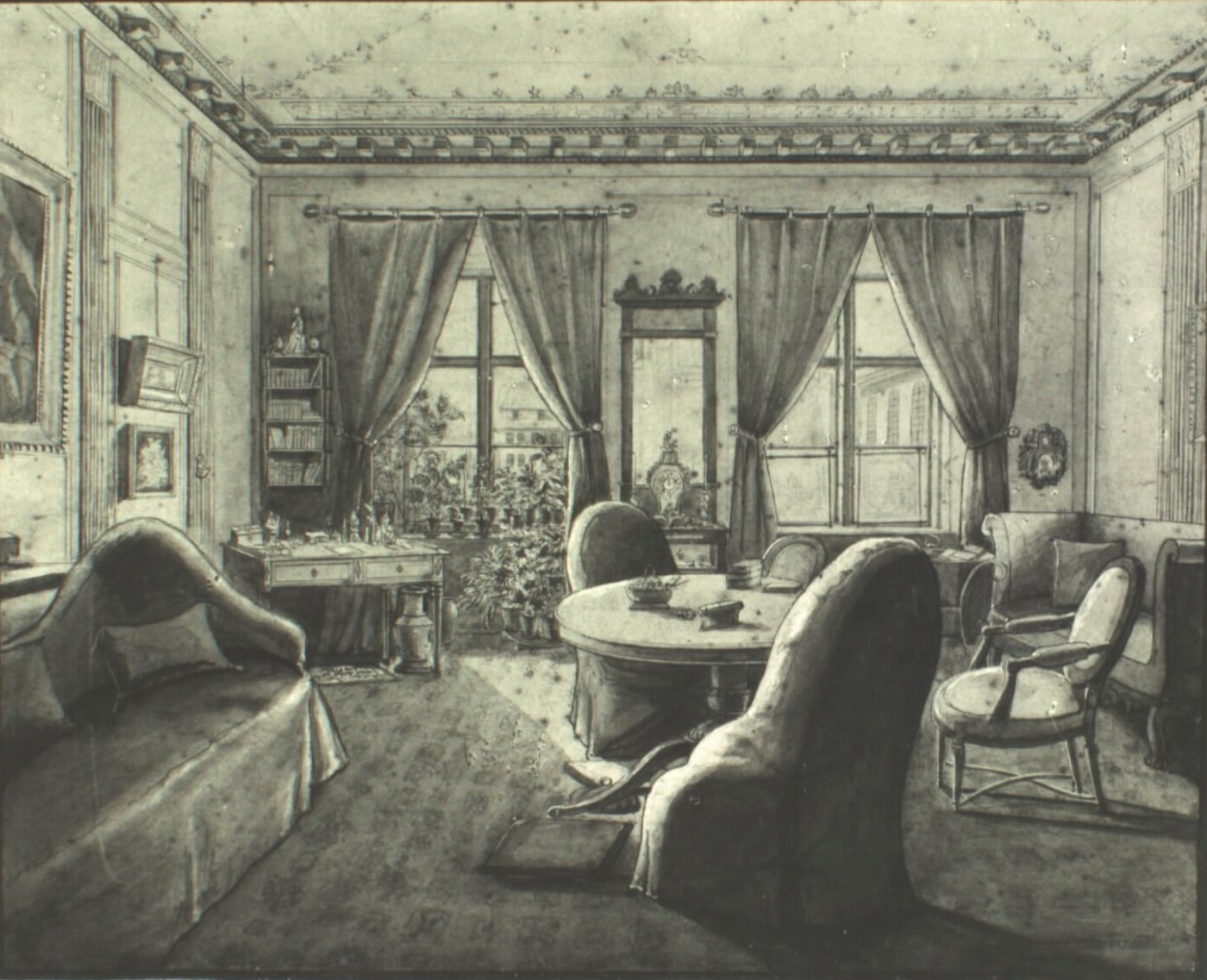
Carl Moltke's living room

At the time of the 1840 census, No. 112 was home to 49 residents. Adolph Carl Peter Callisen and Haagen Mathiesen were still residing with their families in two of the apartments. Carl Moltke, director of Rentekammeret, resided in the third apartment with his wife Anne Malvine Moltke (née Simons), their three children (aged seven to 15), the tutor Ernst Ludvig Goske, a governess, a nanny, a female cook, two male servants and two maids.

The building was acquired before 1845 by Joseph Carl, Count Reventlow Criminil, president of the Slesvig Holsteen-Lauenborgske Chancellery, who by then resided in one of the apartments with his wife Charlotte (née Grevinde Platen Hallermund), 43-year-old Baronesse Adeline Blome and a staff of 10 people. Ancker Wilhelm Frederik von Bornemann, a retired Supreme Court justice, resided in another apartment with his wife Harriet (née Parsons), a housekeeper, a female cook, a maid, a male servant and a caretaker. Adolf Ludvig Køppen (1804–1873), a retired royal librarian and professor of history, resided in the building alone. Peter Petersen, a royal lackey and tavernkeeper, resided in the building with his wife Johanne Giertrud Hansen, their two children (aged 4) and two lodgers. Rasmus Mathiesen Arreboe Hansen, a shoemaker and the building's concierge, resided in the basement with his wife Susanne Anna (née Forbach).

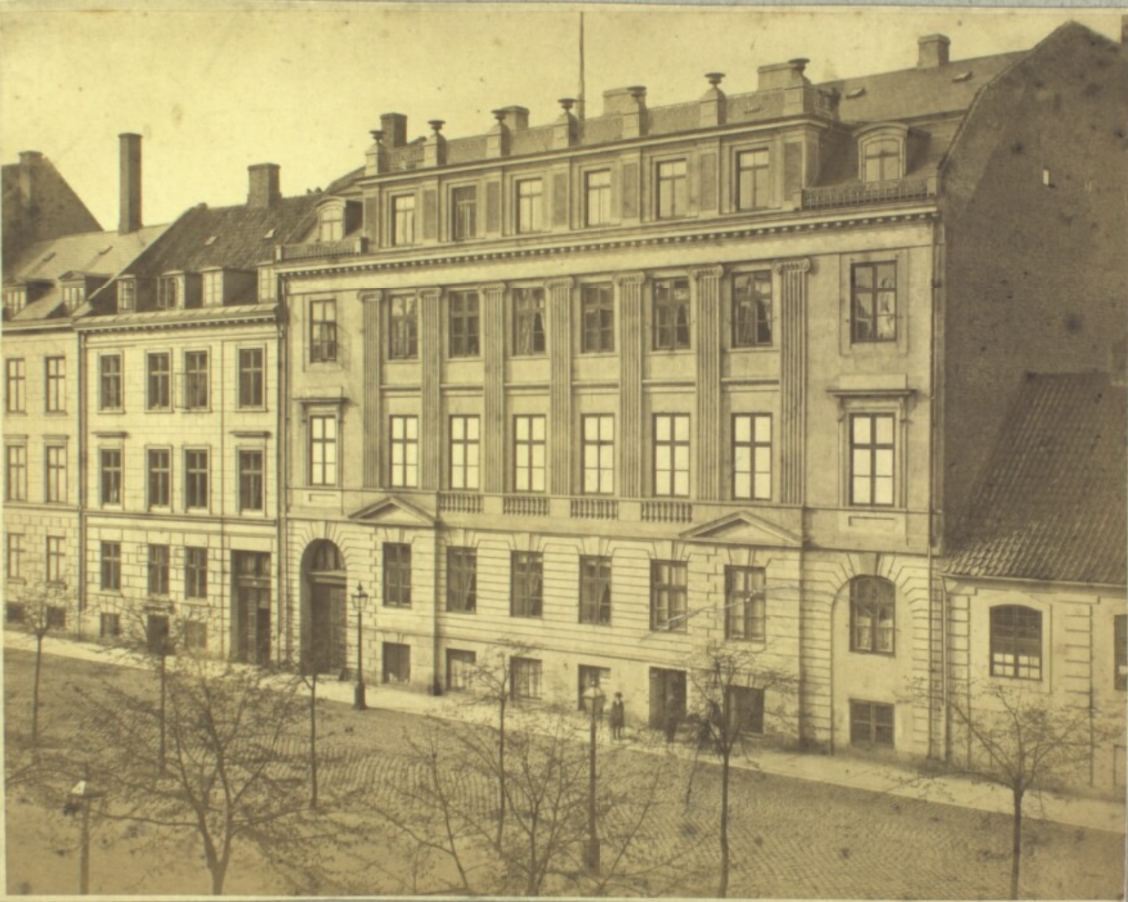
No. 11 in an old photo

At the time of the 1850 census, Bornemann was still residing with his family in the ground floor apartment (1763–1854). Cosmus Bornemann (1806–1877), Bornemann's son, a judge in Den kongelige Landsoverret samt Hof- og Stadsret and the owner of the property, resided on the second floor. He lived there with Sigfrid Victor Scheel. Daniel Olsen, a manufacturer, resided in the garret with his wife Emilie Jakkobsen and their five-year-old son. Petter Pettersen and Rasmus Mathiesen Aneboe Hansen were also still based in the basement. The latter had by then become a master shoemaker and a tenant in his own right (instead of Petersen's lodger).

Cosmus Bornemann was married to Wilhelmine Constance Walterstorff (1934–1881), with whom he had five children. He was later married to Louise Nicoline Mathiesen, a daughter of Haagen Mathiesen (cf. the 1834 and 1840 census). Their son Cosmus Von Bornemann (1857–1911) lived with his wife Juliane Louise Anker (1864–1929) in the apartment on the second floor with their son Ove Henrik Cosmus von Bornemann. in 1804. At the time of the 1906 census, he and his family still lived in the same apartment. At the 1915 and 1919 census, Ove Bornemann was registered as a resident of the ground floor apartment.

== Architecture ==
The building consists of three storeys over a high cellar, and is eight bays wide. The six central bays are flanked by pilasters on the two upper floors. Decorative elements include triangular pediments over the 2nd and 7th window of the first floor, and balustrades under the four central windows of the second floor. The two slightly recessed outer bays are wider than the other, and the one at the western end of the building has an arched gateway, while the first floor window at the eastern end of the building is placed in an arched niche to promote an impression of symmetry. The six-bay dormer in the roof is a later addition. The complex also comprises a side wing that projects from the rear side of the building and a rear wing. The entire complex was listed on the Danish Registry of Protected Buildings and Places in 1918.

The design of the facade closely resembles that of Rewert's building at No. 5, except that it is one bay wider and only has one gateway.

== Today ==
Café No. 11 is located in the high cellar while the rest of the building is offices. Bruun & Stengade, a fashion company, is based on the third floor.
