= Kronprinsessegade 26 =

Building in Copenhagen, Denmark

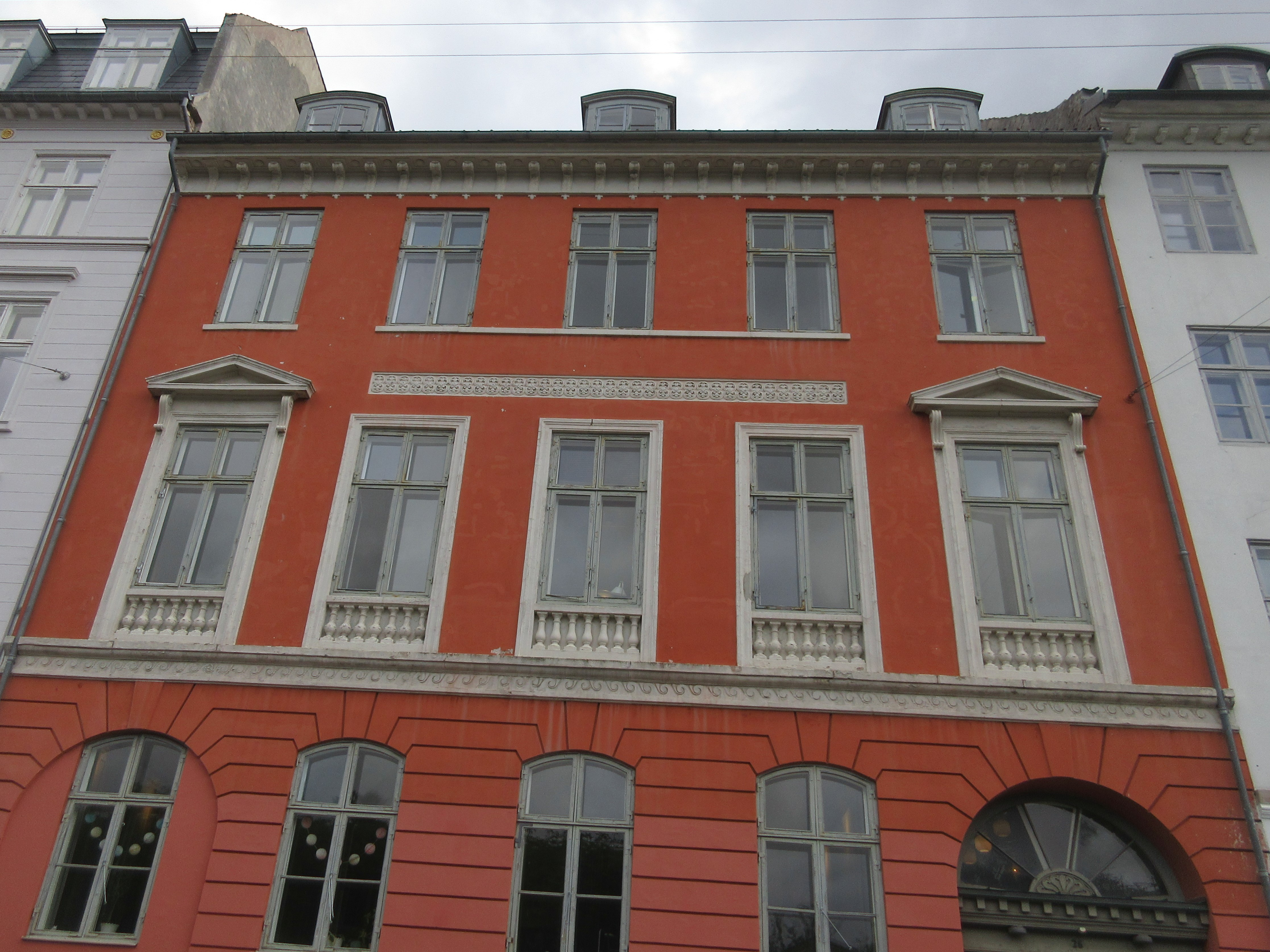
- Interactive map of the Kronprinsessegade 26 area

General information
- Location: Copenhagen, Denmark
- Coordinates: 55°41′1.86″N 12°34′5″E
- Completed: 1806

Design and construction
- Architect: Jørgen Henrich Rawert

Kronprinsessegade 26 is a Neoclassical property overlooking Rosenborg Castle Garden in central Copenhagen, Denmark. The building was listed on the Danish registry of protected buildings and places in 1932.

== History ==
=== Rawert ===
Kronprinsessegade 26 was built by city builder (stadskonduktør) Jørgen Henrich Rawert in 1805–1806. He also constructed the neighbouring buildings at No. 28 and No. 30. Rawert lived in the building at No. 26 from 1806 to 1816.

The property was listed in the new cadastre of 1806 as No. 394 in St. Ann's West Quarter.

=== Smidt, Kaas-Lehn and Rosenørn Lehn ===
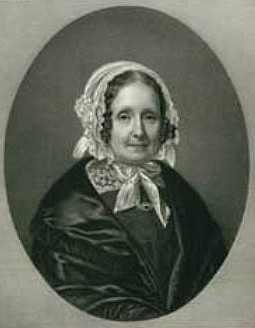
Christiane Henriette Rosenørn-Lehn, née von Barner.

In 1810, Rawert parted with the property. The buyers were Otto Ditlev Kaas-Lehn, til Stamhuset Nedergaard (1882–1811) and a man named Smidt. Kaas-Lehn was the son of admiral Frederik Christian Kaas and Edele Sofie Kaas (Sparre), til Stamhuset Nedergaard. He was married to Christiane Henriette von Barner til Berritzgaard and Orebygaard. On 28 December 1804, he was created a baron (friherre) under the name Kaas-Leh, Lehn was the maiden name of his wife's mother, Margrethe Krabbe Lehn, daughter of Poul Abraham Lehn. Otto Ditlev Kaas-Lehn died on 21 December 1811 and did thus not have much time to enjoy his share of the building.

In 1820, Lehn-Kaas' widow brought the property into her marriage with Henrik Christian Rosenørn-Lehn.

=== Amalie Heyliger, 1825–1867 ===
In 1825, No. 304 was acquired by Amalie Heyliger. She was born on Saint Croix in 1794 as the daughter of planter Jan (John) de Wint Heyliger (1769–1799) and Wilhelmina Carolina Kaas Mur (1767–1800). She had become an orphan at the age of six. Her mother was the daughter of Wolfgang Kaas (1724–1778) and Friderica Amalia Hagen (1743–1731).

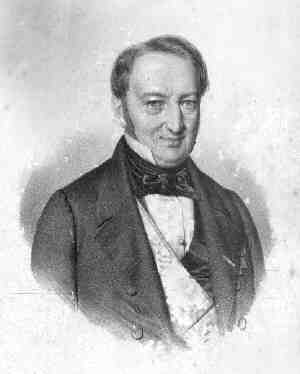
Niels Adler.

Heyliger resided in the ground-floor apartment with her aunts Margrethe and Ulrica Kaas at the 1834 census. They lived there with one male servant and two maids. H. Gerson, a businessman (stadsmægler), resided on the first floor with his wife Emille David, their son Nicolai Gerson, their daughter Augusta Gerson, one male servant and two maids. Niels Adler (1775–1761), a whole sale merchant (grosserer), resided on the second floor with his wife Ane Charlotte (née Enghel, l1789-1871), their three children (aged 17 to 22), one male servant and two maids.

In c. 1939, Amalie Heyliger bpught a parcvel of land on Strandvejen north of the city. She used it for the construction of a country house, naming it Søholm after a faience factory which had previously been located on the site.

Heyliger's property in Kronprinsessegade was home to 23 residents in four households at the 1840 census. Amalie Heyliger and Ulrikke Kaas still resided in the ground-floor apartment with one male servant and two maids. Emilie Gerson, a widow, resided on the first floor with her son Nicolai Gerson (wholesale merchant and daughter Augusta Gerson, one male servant and two maids. Niels and Charlotte Adler still resided on the second floor with their children (aged 22 to 28), one male servant and two maids. Johan Gottfred Grünevoldt, a concierge, resided in the basement with his wife Margrethe Grünevoldt and their two daughters (aged 16 and 17).

Amalie Heyliger and Ulrikke Kass still lived together in the ground-floor apartment at the time of the 1850 census.

The politician Harald Raasløff resided in one of the apartments in 1855–56. He served as Minister of Schlesvig Affairs from 12 December 1854 to 8 February 1856. C. A. von Schepelern (1794–1870), commandant of Copenhagen, was a resident in the building from 1857 to 1875.

=== Holmblad ===
In 1867, Kronprinsessegade 26 was acquired by Jacob Arnold Christian Holmblad (1839–1904). He was the son of Lauritz Peter Holmblad and married to Harriet Arabella Vilhelmine Theodora Elisabeth Brücker (1847–1929).

The businessman Gotfred Jacob Halkier resided in the second-floor apartment at the 1885 census. He lived there with his wife Ettie Halkier, their 15-year-old son Peter Ernst Harald Halkier and two maids.

The property was later passed to their son Andreas Christian Holmblad (1874-). He was thus mentioned as the owner of the property in 1908. He also owned Prinsessegade 1, Amagerbrogade 3, Holmbladsgade 9 and Strandvej 146.

Andreas Christian Holmblad's sister, Therese Fernanda Holmblad (1868–1928), was married to Axel Otto Tage Niels Basse von Kauffmann (1858–1937), owner of Egholm in Hornsherred. She lived in one of the apartments of Kronprinsessegade 26 at the 1906 census. She lived there with three maids, with no mention of her husband. Jacob Gotfred Halkier, a businessman (grosserer), resided in another apartment with his wife Ettie Halkier, their son Hans Peter Ernst Harald Halkier (managing director of Frederiksvæk Stålvalseværk) and two maids. H. F. Axil Hockelbach, a clek (korrespondent), resided in the building with his translator Frants Frederik Verner Lexow. Jens Petersen, an office courier, resided in the building with his wife Johanne Christine Petersen, their son, daughter-in-law and grandson. Conrad Gabriel Gottlieb Ringling, the building's concierge, resided in the building with his wife Elna Maria Ringling, their son and an unmarried woman.

=== Lemvigh-Müller fanily ===
In 1911, it was acquired by Adimph Christian Lemvigh-Müller. It was later passed to his son and only child Aage Lemvigh-Müller )1895-1973).

== Architecture ==
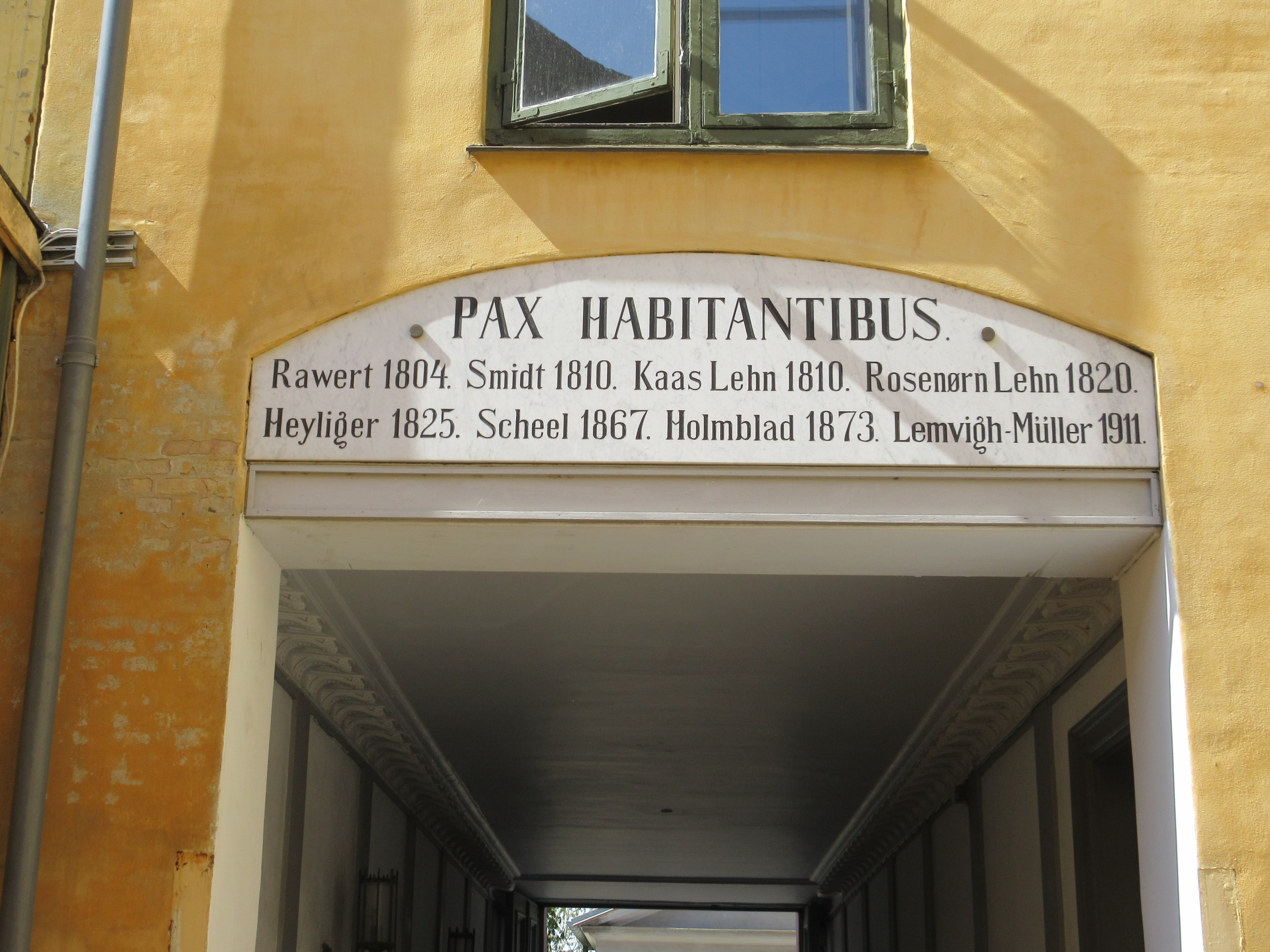
The inscription above the gateway in the courtyard

The main wing consists of three storeys over a high cellar and is five bays wide. The windows on the first floor have baluster decorations. The two outer windows on the first floor are topped by triangular pediments and the three central ones are topped by a frieze.

A gateway topped by a fanlight opens to a narrow courtyard. A 13 bay side wing extends from the rear side of the building.

An inscription above the gateway in the courtyard reads "pax habitantibus" and lists a number of names and years: "Revert 1804 - Smidt 1810 - Kaas Lehn 1810 - Rosenørn Lehn 1820 - Heyliger 1825 - Scheel 1867 - Holmblad 1873 - Lemvigh-Müller 1911".

== Today ==
The property is now owned by Peter and Dorte Salskov-Iversen. They are the children of Annette Lemvigh-Müller (born 1827), daughter of Aage Lemvigh-Müller (1895–1973). The building is operated as serviced boutique co-office space.

== Gallery ==
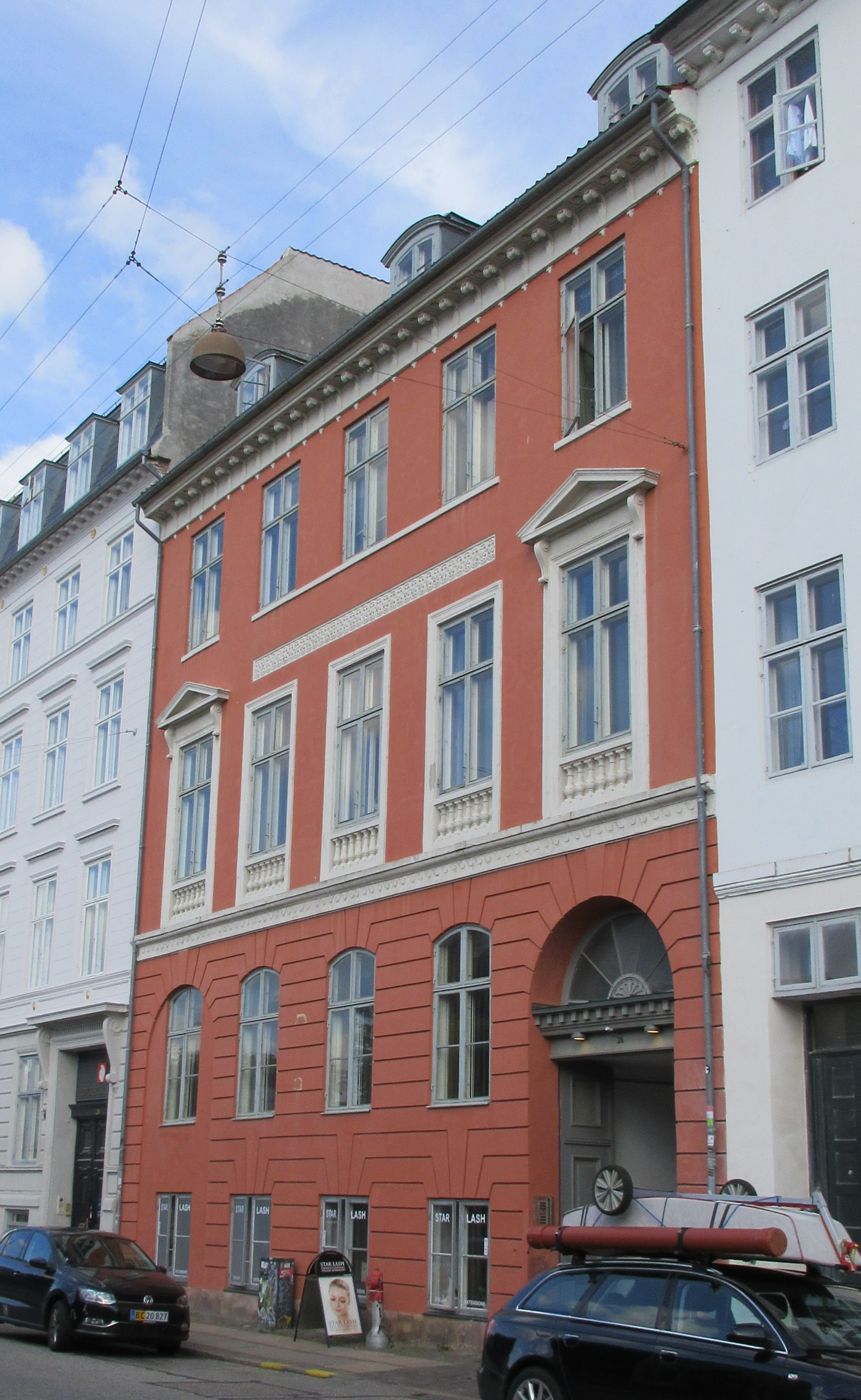
The facade.

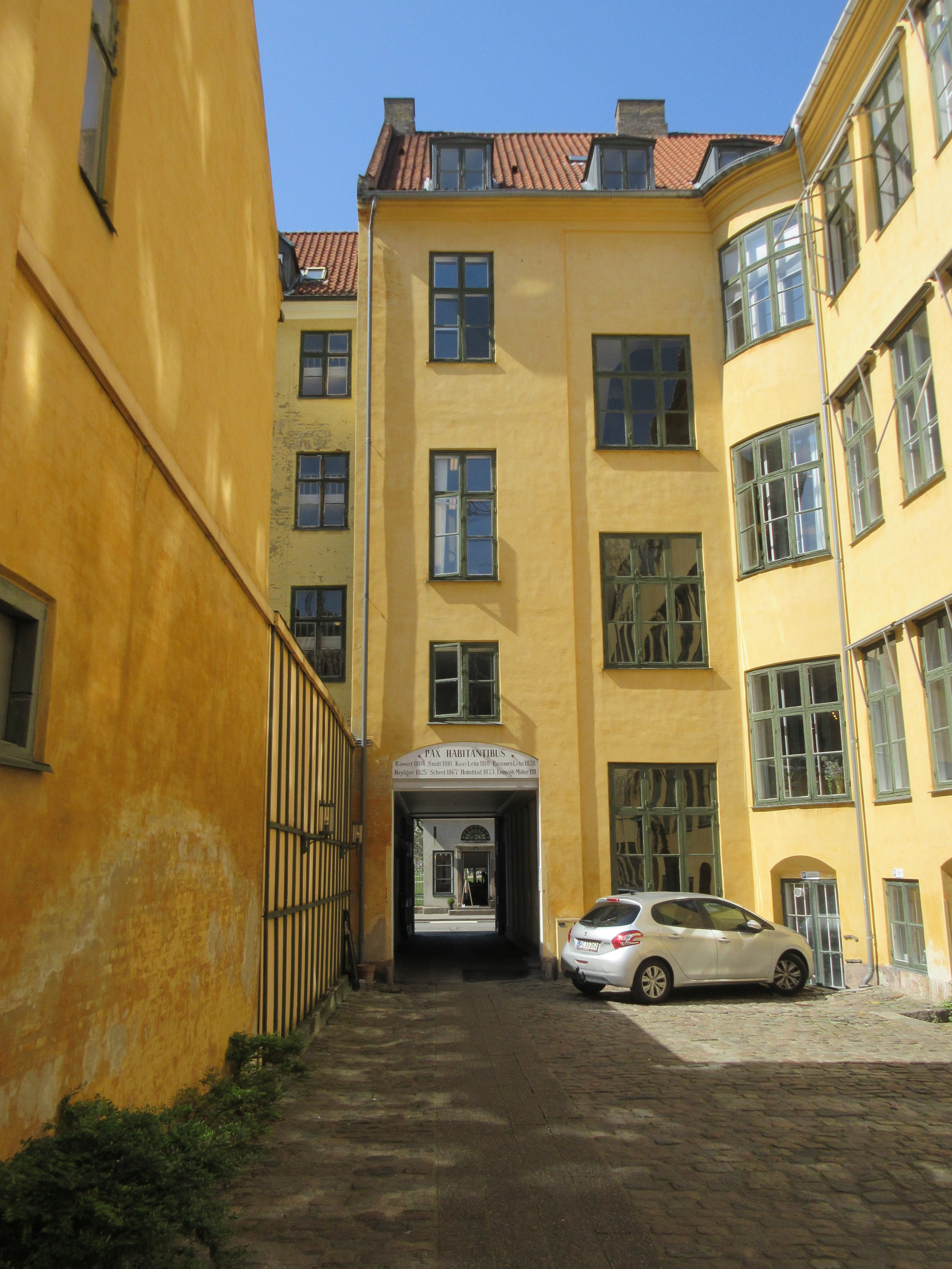
The rear side of the main wing

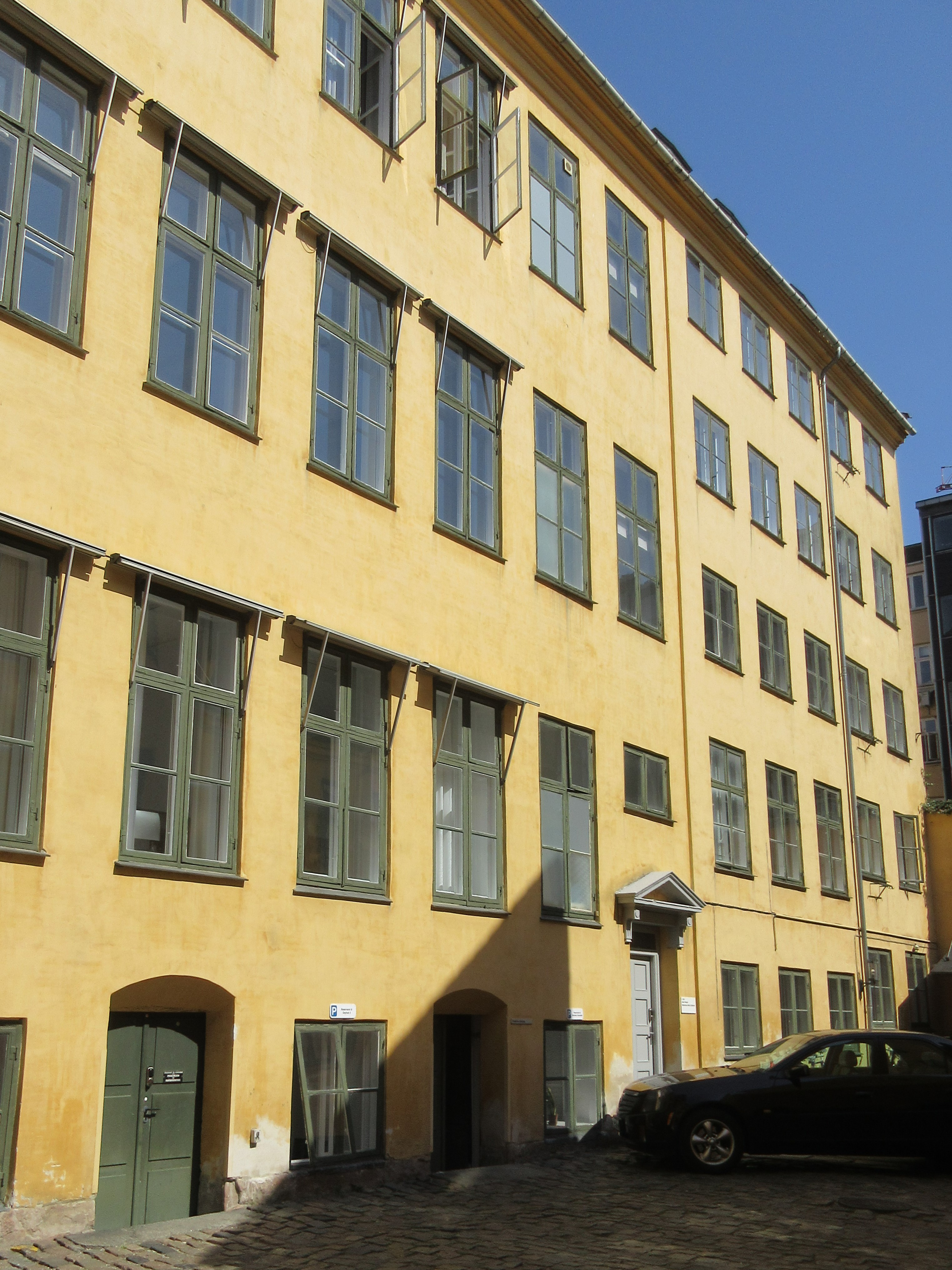
The side wing

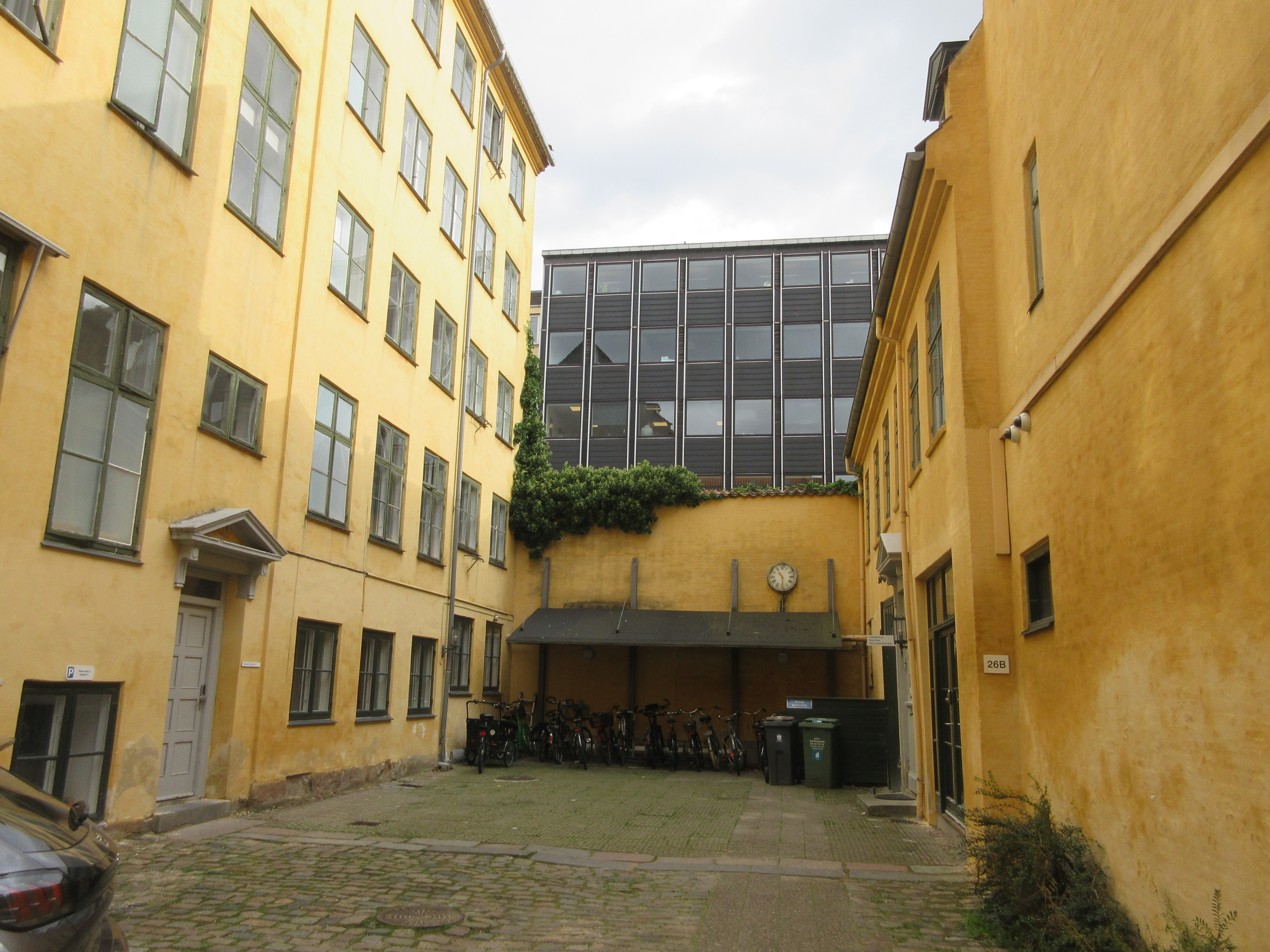

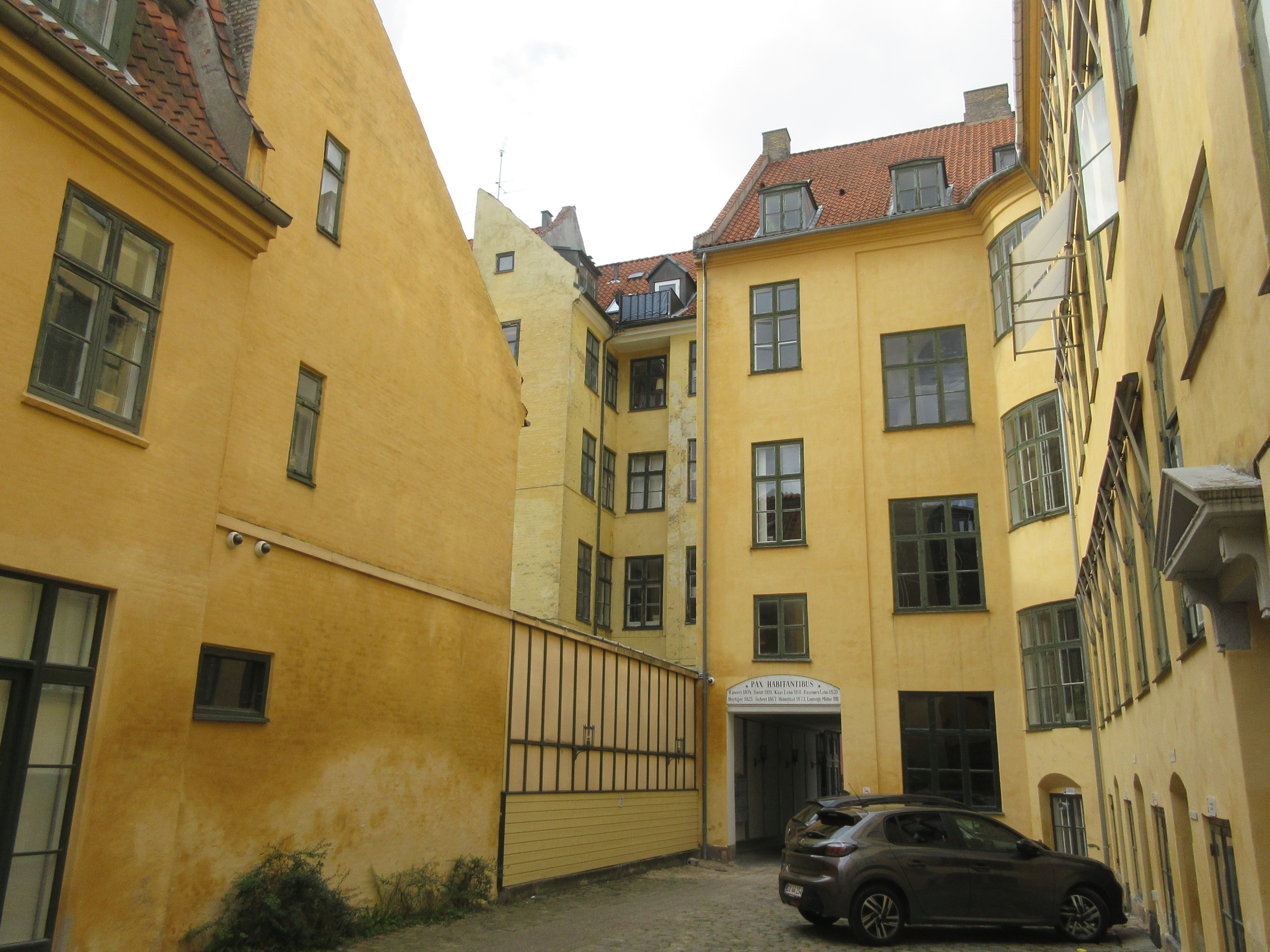

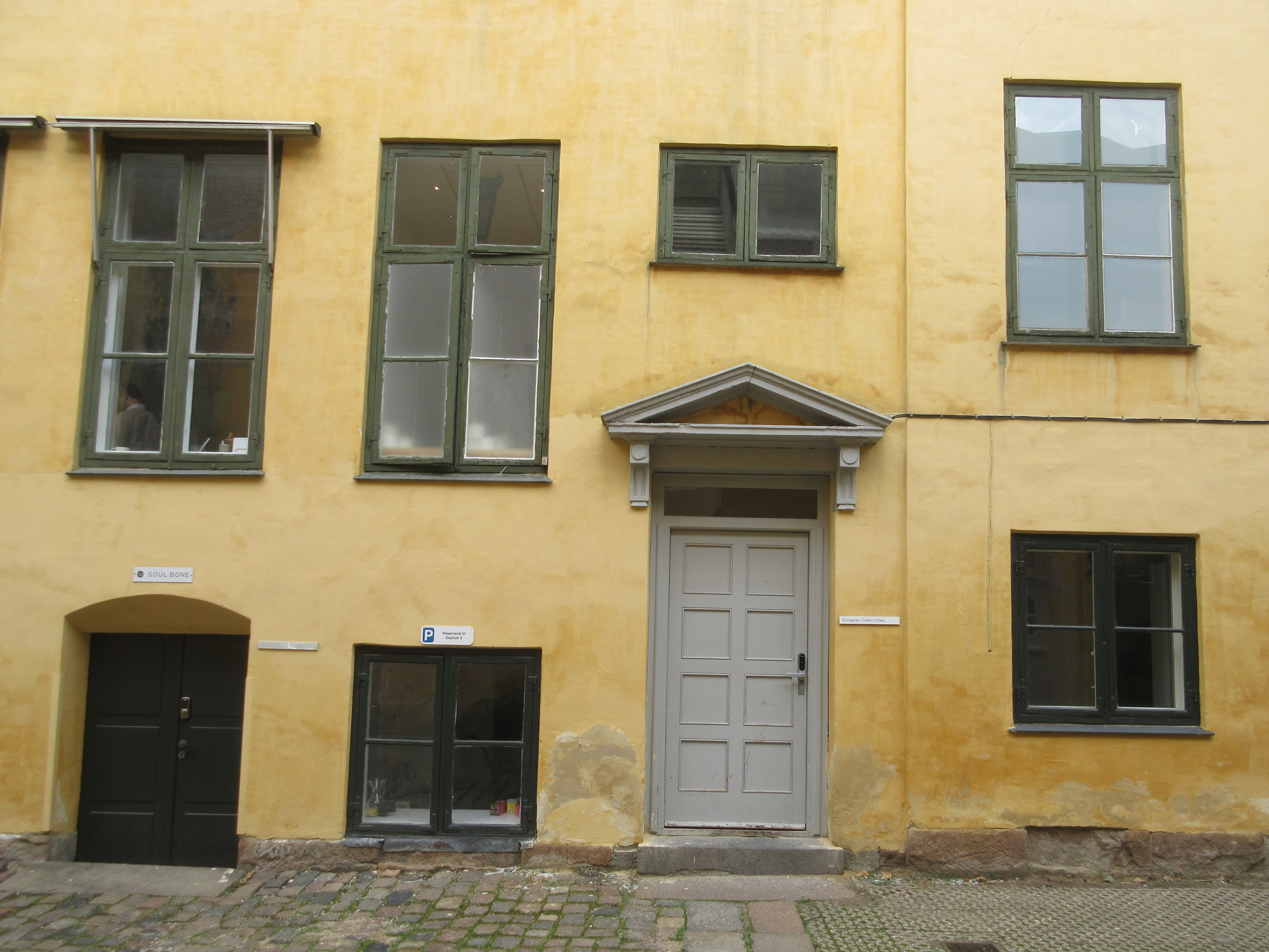
Entrance in the side wing.

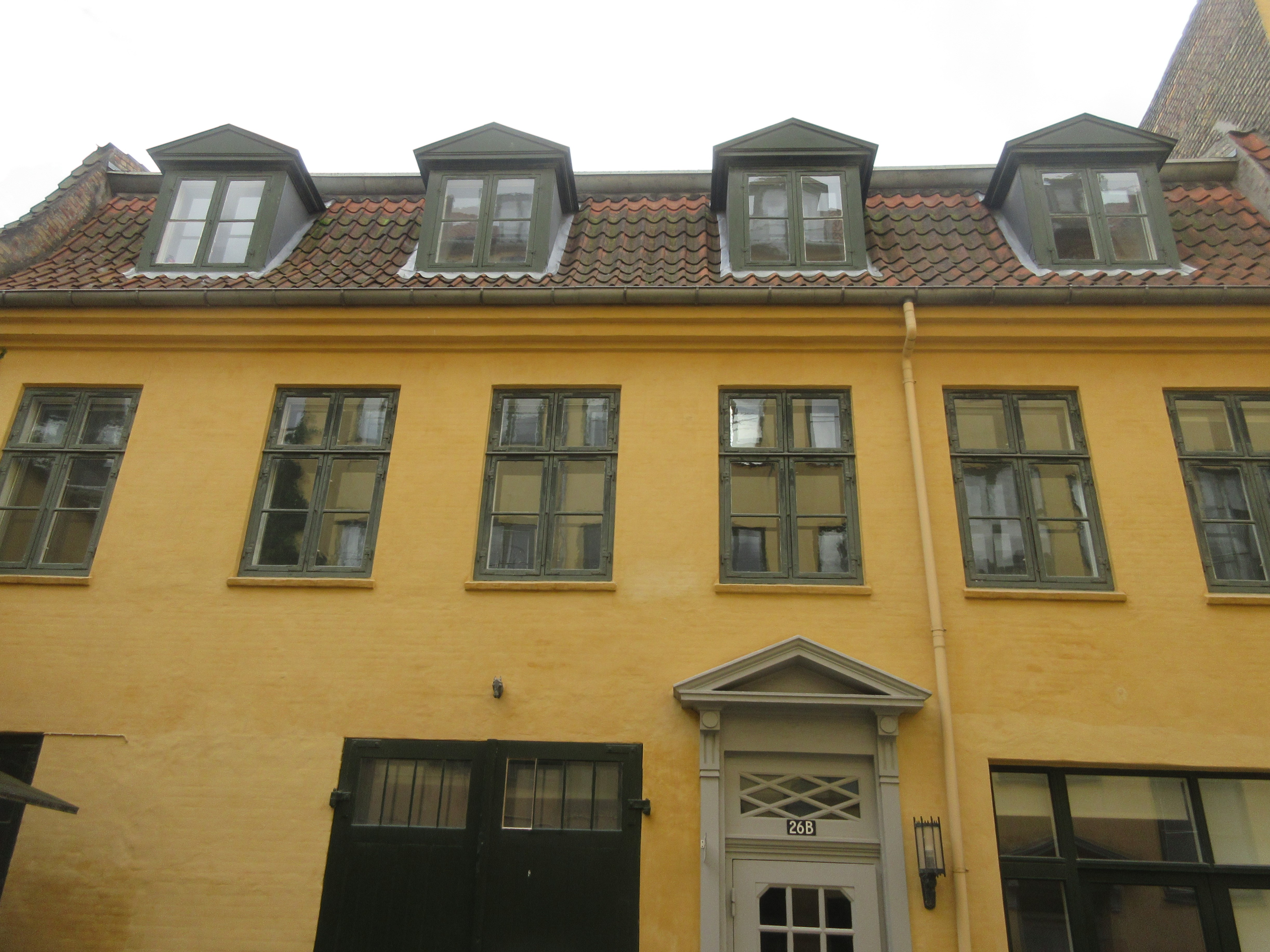
Kronprinsessegade 25B
