= Christopher Bagnæs Hansen =

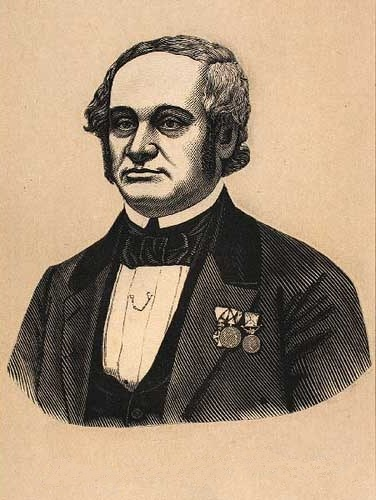
- Born: 24 February 1806; Copenhagen, Denmark
- Died: 16 January 1868 (aged 61); Copenhagen, Denmark
- Occupation: Furniture maker

Christopher Bagnæs Hansen (24 February 1806 – 16 January 1868) was a Danish court furniture maker. His company, C. B. Hansens Etablissement, was based in the Erichsen Mansion at Kongens Nytorv.

== Early life and education ==
Hansen was born on 4 February 1806, the son of carpenter Christopher Bagnæs and Anne Stephensen (c. 1775–1854). He grew up in poverty after the early death of his father. He had to care for himself from the age of 8, working first in J. C. Modeweg's textile factory and then as a cobble-layer at Nyboder. His situation improved moderately when his mother remarried Peter Antoni, a laborer, enabling him to attend Holmen's School until beginning a chair-maker's apprentice at 14. At the age of 20, when he completed his apprenticeship, he changed his name to Hansen for reasons that remain unknown.

== Career ==
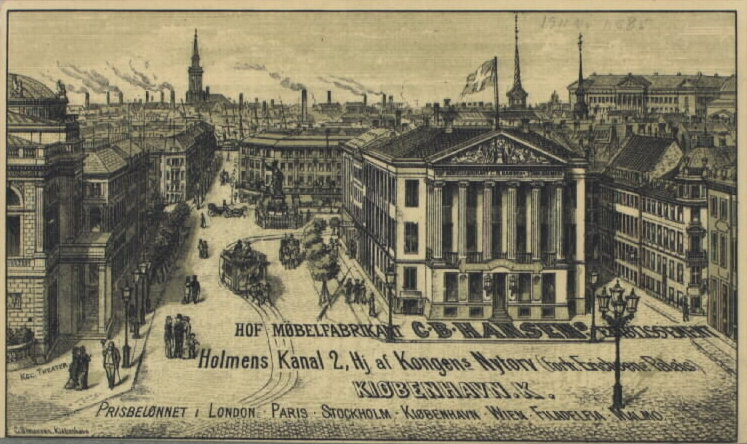
C.B. Hansen advertisement

In 1830, after completing his masterpiece, Hansen established his own business. He established C. B. Hansens Etablissement in 1838 when he was licensed to "manufacture and sell veneer and intarsia furniture of fine imported as well as local types of wood". His business prospered to a degree that in 1843 enabled him to purchase the imposing Erichsen Mansion at Kongens Nytorv. He opened a large furniture store in the building, which exhibited his own works as well as those of his peers. He distinguished himself at The Great Exhibition in London in 1851 and was the only representative of Danish furniture at the 1885 Exposition Universelle in Paris. Later that same year he received an invitation to become a member of the Jouner's Guild in Copenhagen.

C. B. H.s Etablissement developed into one of the leading furniture manufacturing businesses in the country. In the mid-1860s, he began to struggle with poor health and retired from the company 1867. The company was then continued by his son Charles Hansen (1836–95) and son-in-law L. Larsen (1821-1902).

Hansen was active in the management of Industriforeningen. He was a board member of the Association of Craftsmen in Copenhagen from 1857 to 1867 and was involved in the establishment of the Alderstrøst housing estate.

== Personal life ==
Hansen married Claudine Henriette Olsen (25 February 1803 - 31 March 1857) on 16 February 1827 in the Garrison Church in Copenhagen but this marriage was later dissolved. He married for a second time, Jacobine Marie Charlotte Krause (14 April 1819 - 11 January 1892) on 19 November 1843 in Damsholte Church. She was the daughter of Johan Diderik Conrad Krause (1770-1846), the gardener at Marienborg Manor, and Anne Charlotte Hedevig Krause née Keilow (1783-1860).
