= Holger Christian Reedtz =

Danish nobleman and Minister of Foreign Affairs (1800–1857)

His Excellency Holger Christian Reedtz S.K..
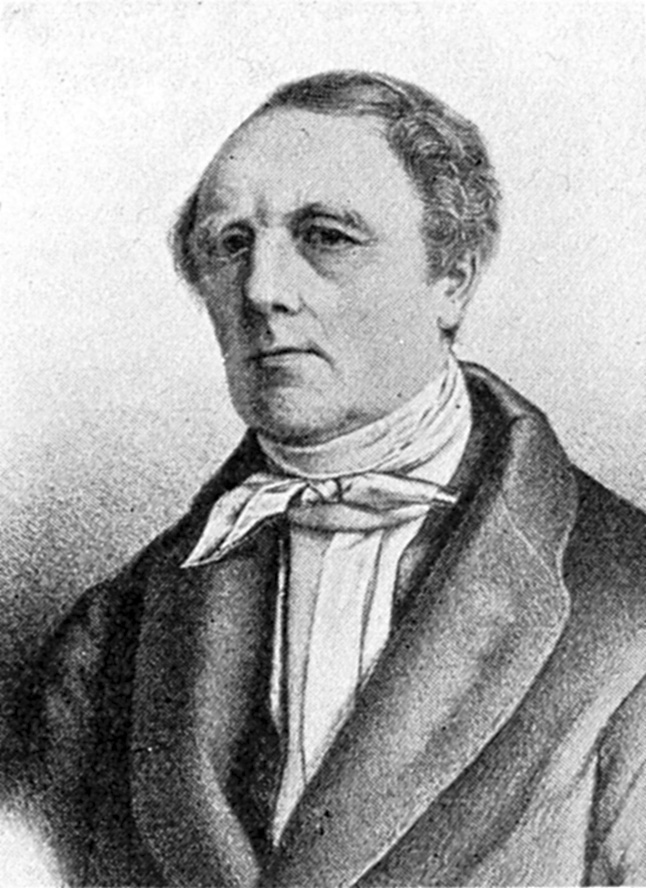

3rd Minister of Foreign Affairs of Denmark
- In office 6 August 1850 – 18 October 1851
- Prime Minister: Adam Wilhelm Moltke
- Preceded by: Adam Wilhelm Moltke
- Succeeded by: Christian Albrecht Bluhme

Personal details
- Born: 14 February 1800 Odense, Kingdom of Denmark
- Died: 6 February 1857 (aged 56) Palsgaard, Denmark
- Resting place: As Cemetery, Denmark
- Party: Independent
- Spouse: Asta Tugendreich Adelheid komtesse Krag-Juel-Vind-Frijs (m. 1848)
- Children: 4
- Parent(s): Niels Juel Reedtz; Cathrine Sophie Vilhelmine Benzon
- Education: Copenhagen University

Holger Christian Reedtz S.K. (14 February 1800 – 6 February 1857) was a Danish aristocrat, landowner, civil servant, diplomat and politician.

A member of the noble Reedtz family, he studied law and history at the University of Copenhagen. From 1831 he served as secretary of the Department of Foreign Affairs, but resigned after a falling out with the king in 1842. In 1848, Reedtz returned to service as a diplomat. He briefly served as the third Minister of Foreign Affairs of Denmark from 1850 to 1851. From 1855 to 1856, he was member of the Council of the Realm (Danish: Rigsrådet) as one of the members appointed by the king.

== Early life ==
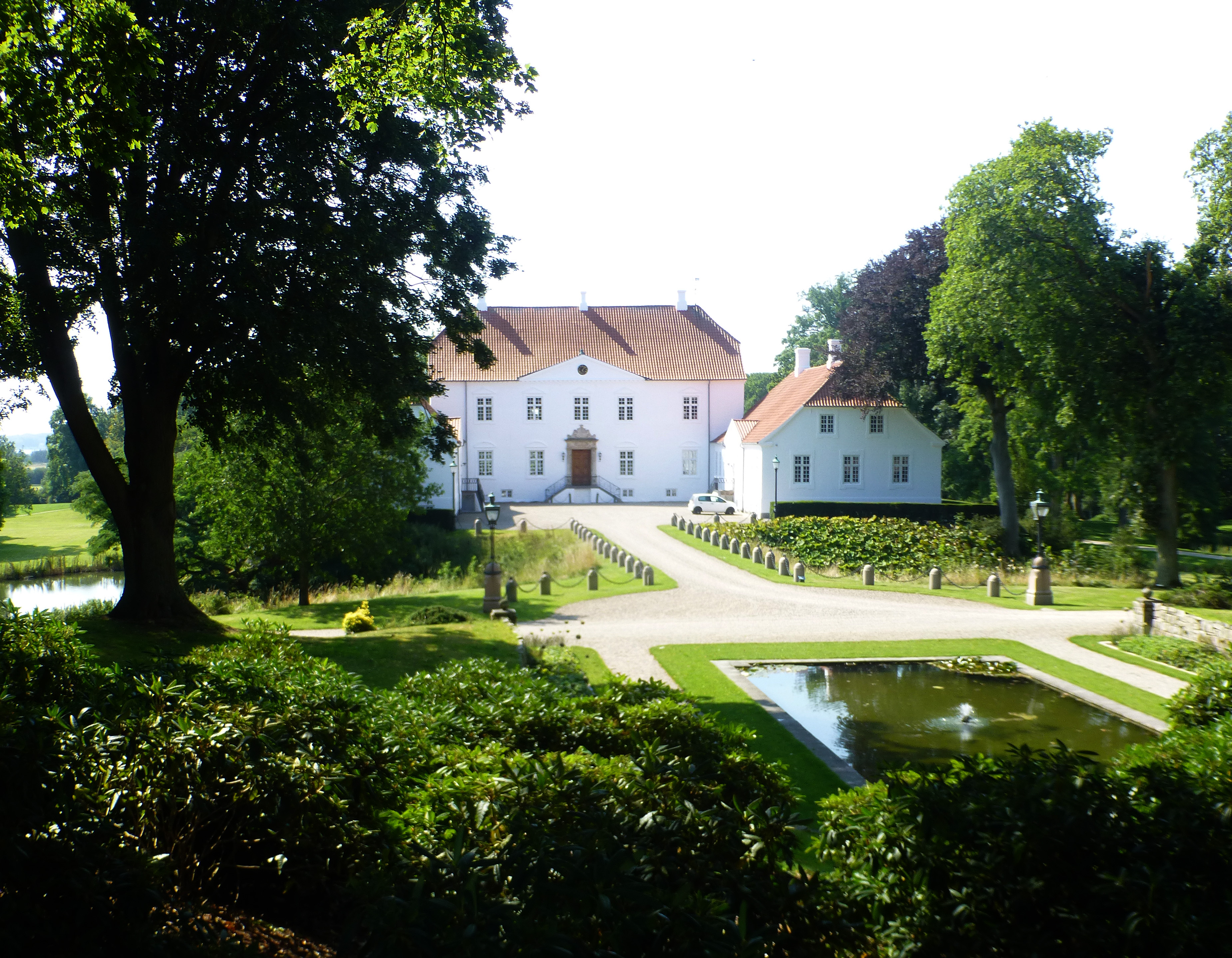
Palsgaard, photographed in 2015

Born in Odense on the Danish island of Funen on 14 February 1800, Holger Christian Reedtz was the eldest son of kammerjunker Niels Juel Reedtz and his wife Cathrine Sophie Vilhelmine Benzon. He grew up with his two years younger brother Otto Arenfeldt Reedtz on the family manor house Palsgaard in East Jutland. In 1818, he passed his university entrance examination, the examen artium, at Odense Cathedral School, from where he continued to Copenhagen to study law at the University of Copenhagen. In 1821 he received the University's gold medal for a historical dissertation.

He passed his legal office examination with a first grade on 11 April 1823 and then continued his studies in history, international law and languages. He prepared a dissertation on Denmark's treaties with foreign powers from the time of Canute the Great in 1026 to the end of the 18th century. The thesis was published in French in Göttingen in 1826 and was well received. The years 1827 and 1828 he spent on a study trip to Munich and Vienna.

== Early career ==
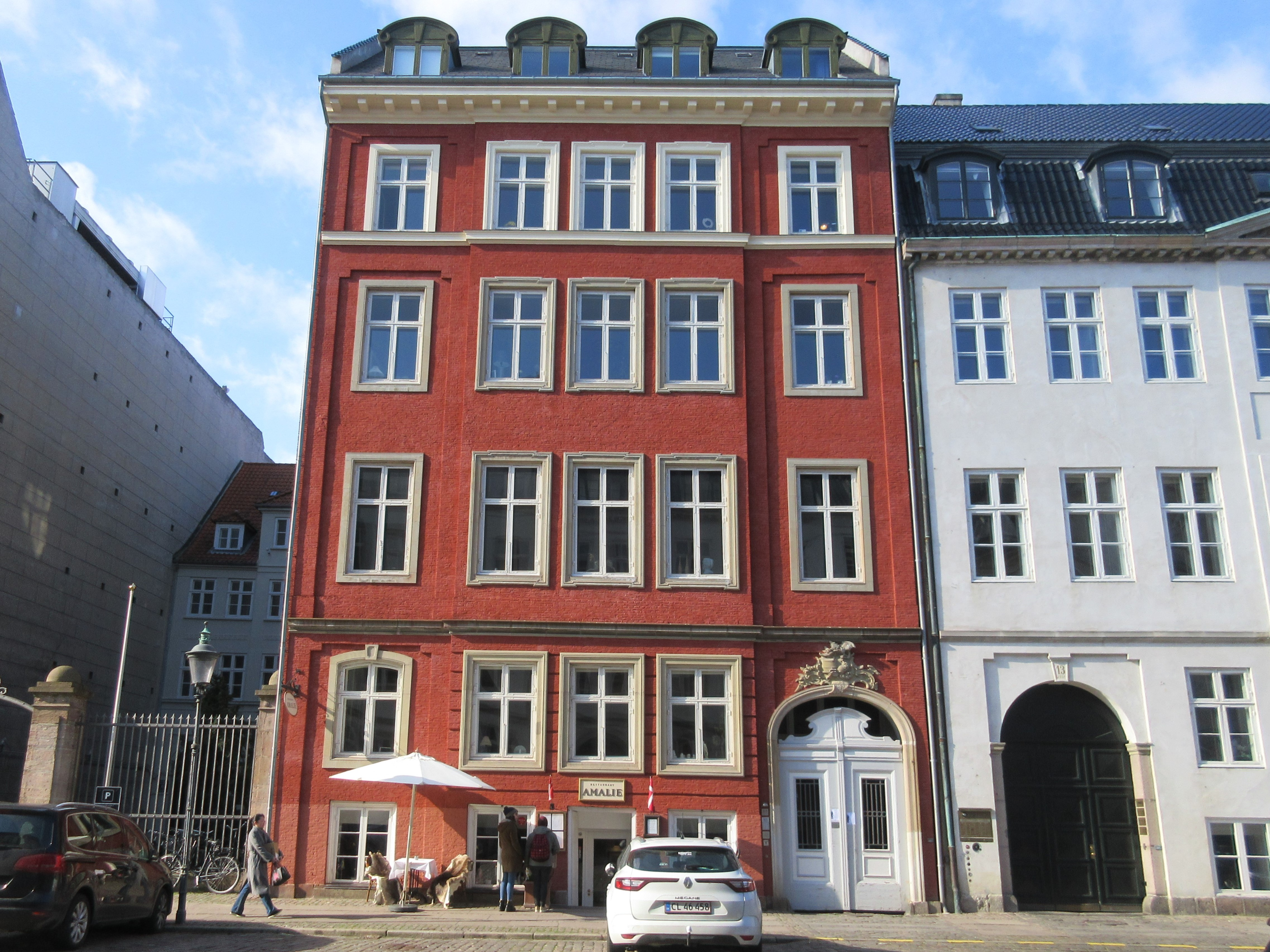
The 18th century building at Amaliegade 11 in Copenhagen, where Reedtz resided from 1832 to 1835

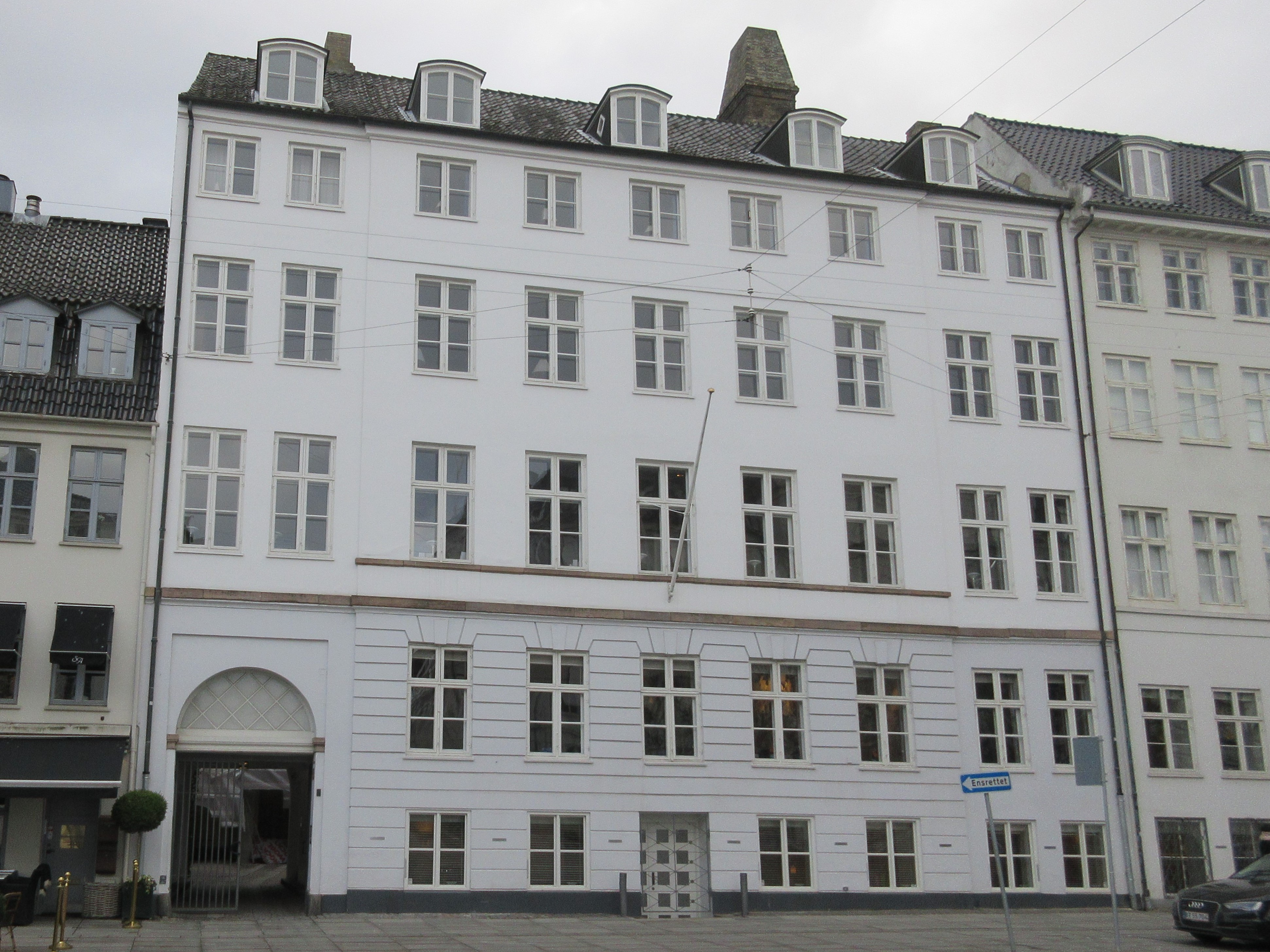
The Neoclassical building at Sankt Annæ Plads 10 in Copenhagen, where Reedtz was a resident from 1836 to 1842

Upon his return, Reedtz became an intern at the Department of Foreign Affairs (the later Ministry of Foreign Affairs), where he was subsequently employed as a secretary from 1831 to 1842. In 1842 he resigned his position because he felt that King Christian VIII had bypassed him, as he had himself contacted Sweden in the matter of the abolishment of the Sound Dues, a subject Reedtz as official had worked on for a long time. As he could not accept the king's intervention behind his back in these negotiations, he resigned his position.

After this, he returned to Palsgaard, the ownership of which he, together with his brother Otto Arenfeldt Reedtz, had taken over after his mother in 1835. When the brother in 1846 moved with his family to the estate Tamdrup Bisgaard, which he had bought, Reedtz continued as sole owner of Palsgaard. There, he pursued his astronomical interest, corresponded with the German-Danish astronomer Heinrich Christian Schumacher in Altona in the then Danish Duchy of Holstein, and also published his research in the journal Astronomische Nachrichten (English: Astronomical Notes).

== Later career ==
In 1847, as the owner of a manorial estate, Reedtz became a member of the Advisory Assembly of the Estates for Northern Jutland with meeting place in Viborg. After the introduction of the constitutional monarchy in 1848, Reedtz briefly served as the third Minister of Foreign Affairs of Denmark from 1850 to 1851.

From 1855 to 1856, he was member of the Council of the Realm (Danish: Rigsrådet) as one of the members appointed by the king.

== Later life ==
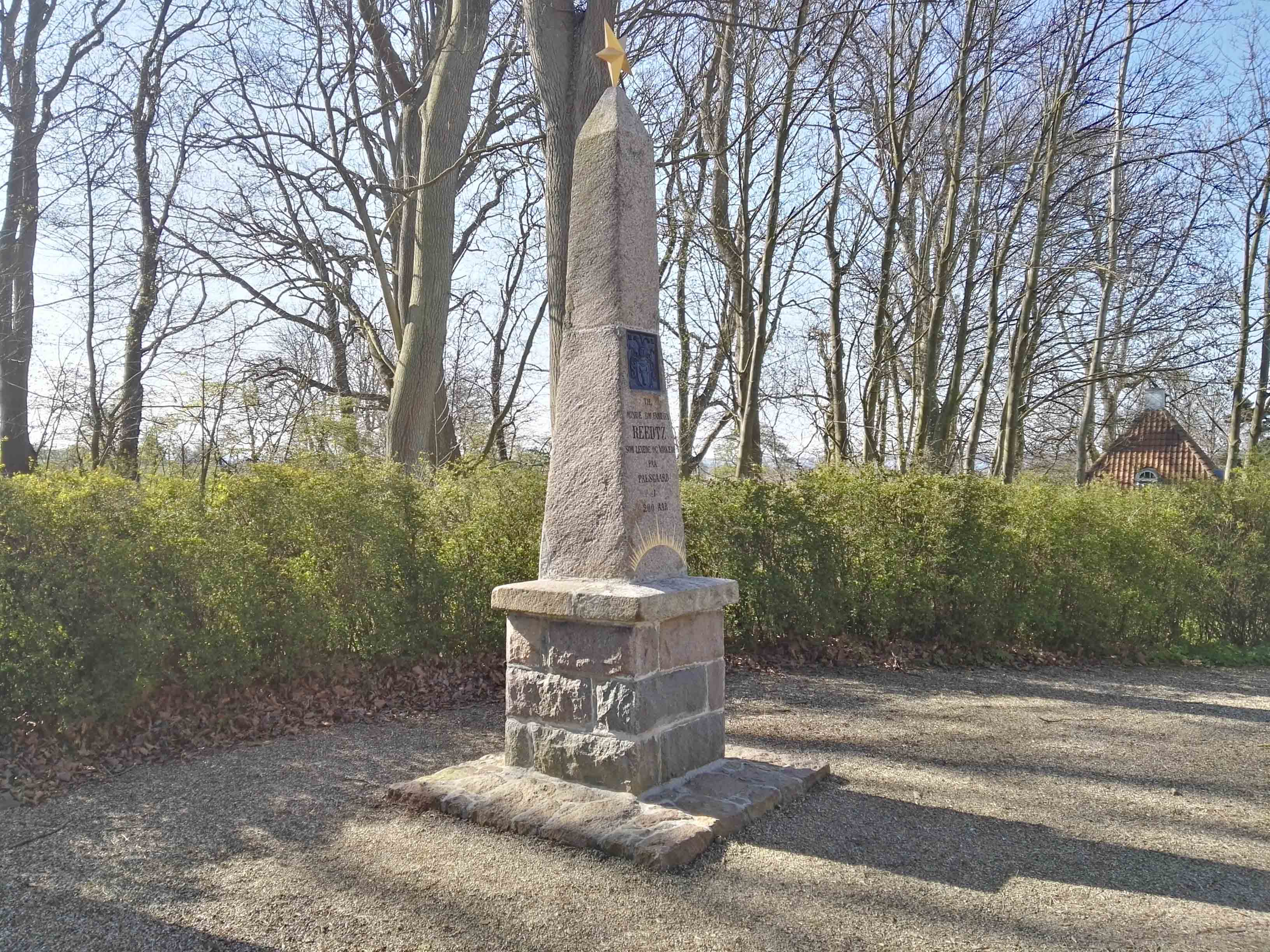
Memorial obelisk for the Reedtz family at Palsgaard

In 1856, he resigned and moved back to Palsgaard, where he resumed his astronomical studies, and was appointed to be the chairman of the Commission for the Construction of an astronomical observatory in Altona in 1853. He built himself an observatory at Palsgaard. He died there on 6 February 1857. He was buried at the family mausoleum in the cemetery of As Church near Palsgaard.

== Notes and references ==
=== Bibliography ===
- Vedel, Peter (1899). "Holger Christian Reedtz". Dansk biografisk Lexikon, tillige omfattende Norge for tidsrummet 1537-1814 (in Danish). 13 (1st ed.). Copenhagen: Gyldendals Forlag: 559–362.

Political offices
Preceded by Adam Wilhelm Moltke	Foreign Minister of Denmark; 1850–1851	Succeeded by Christian Albrecht Bluhme
