= Erichsen Mansion =

Building in Copenhagen, Denmark

- Erichsens Palæ
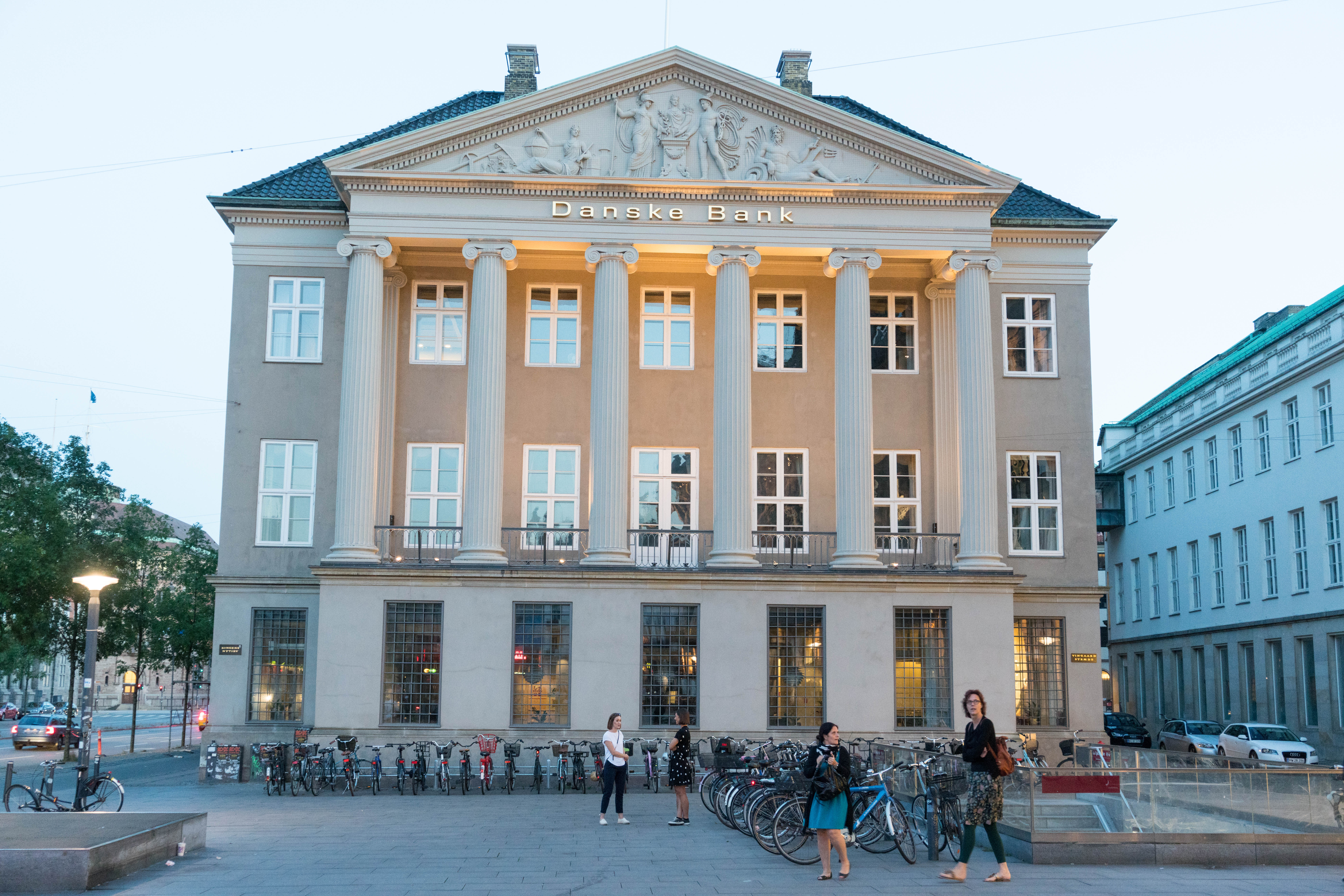
- The mansion viewed from Kongens Nytorv
- Interactive map of the Erichsen Mansion area

General information
- Architectural style: Caspar Frederik Harsdorff
- Location: Copenhagen, Denmark
- Coordinates: 55°40′42.59″N 12°35′7.74″E
- Construction started: 1799
- Completed: 1801
- Client: Erich Erichsen

The Erichsen Mansion (Danish: Erichsens Palæ) is a historic building located at Kongens Nytorv in central Copenhagen, Denmark. It is now part of Danske Bank's headquarters.

== History ==
=== Site history, 1689–1795 ===
Back in the late 17th century, the site was made up of five small properties. They were listed in Copenhagen's first cadastre from 1689 as No. 252–256 in Eastern Quarter. They belonged to councilman Jørgen Eilersen's widow (No. 252) diskal Mikkel Mikkelsen (No. 253 and No. 256), Gert Vinnike (No. 254), kammeradcokat Succow (No. 255).

In the new cadastre of 1756 the five properties were listed as No. 403–406 and No. 312. They belonged to etatsråd Holmsted (No 403), generalauditør Otto Borthuus, konsistorialråd Mathias Hvid (No. 405), captain Holst (No. 406) and kancelliråd Michael Platov (No. 312).o

=== Erich Erichsen's house ===
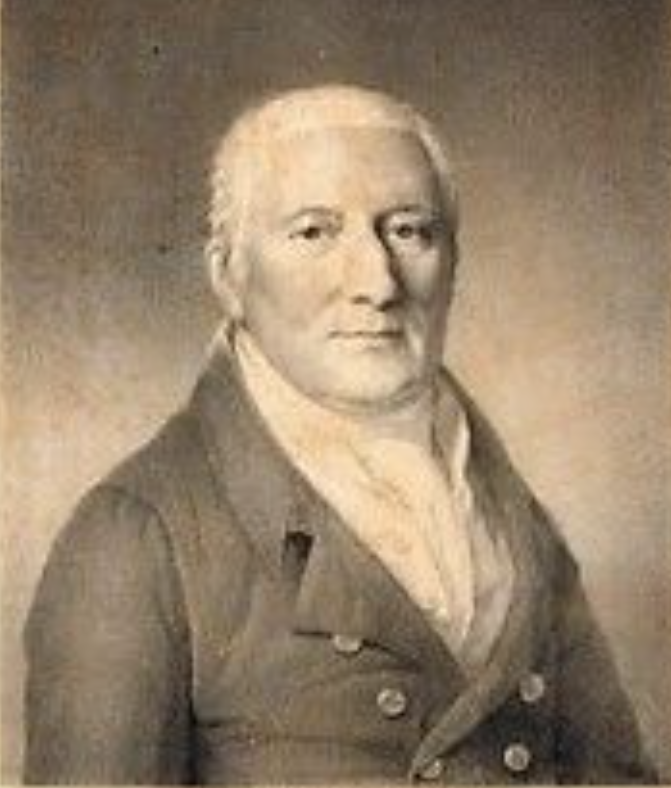
Erich Erichsen

The five properties were all destroyed in the Copenhagen Fire of 1795, together with most of the other buildings in the area. They five fire sites were subsequently merged into a single property by merchant Erich Erichsen. The present building on the site was constructed for him in 1799 to designs by Caspar Frederik Harsdorff. After Harsdorff's death later in the same year, it was completed by his son-in-law Gottfried Schaper in 1801.

=== Jørgensen and Hansen ===
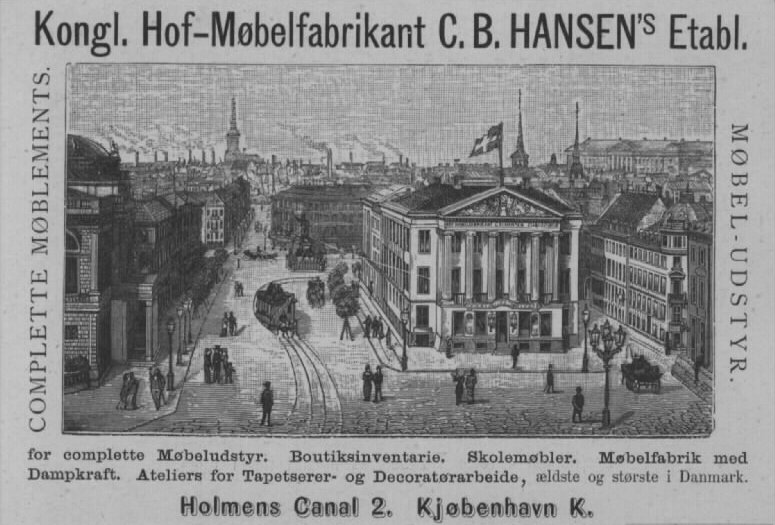
Advertisement for the furniture store

Rasmus Jørgensen, known as Specie-Jørgensen, purchased the building in 1833. In 1846, he sold it to royal furniture maker Christopher Bagnæs Hansen.

=== Bank headquarters ===
Kjøbenhavns Handelsbank acquired the building in 1888. The building was subsequently restored and adapted for its new use under supervision of the architect Frederik Levy. It was completed on 18 April 1891.

=== Hotel ===
Danske Bank sold the property back in 2016, but only moved to their new headquarters at Postbyen in 2024. Thylander A/S, part of the holding group that currently owns the property, signed a lease with the luxury hotel chain Four Seasons in 2026 to develop the location. The deal is valued at 4 billion Danish kroner and planned renovation is estimated at a further 1 billion Danish kroner. The new hotel will accommodate 100 rooms spread over 22,000 square meters and is the Four Seasons first Nordic property.

== Ownership History ==
- 1797-1833 Erich Erichsen
- 1833-1843 Rasmus Jorgensen
- 1843-1868 C.B. Hansen
- 1868-1888 widowed Jacobine Hansen (maiden name Krause)
- 1888-1990 Kjøbenhavns Handelsbank
- 1990-2016 Danske Bank
- Current owner Thylander A/S and holding group

== Architecture ==
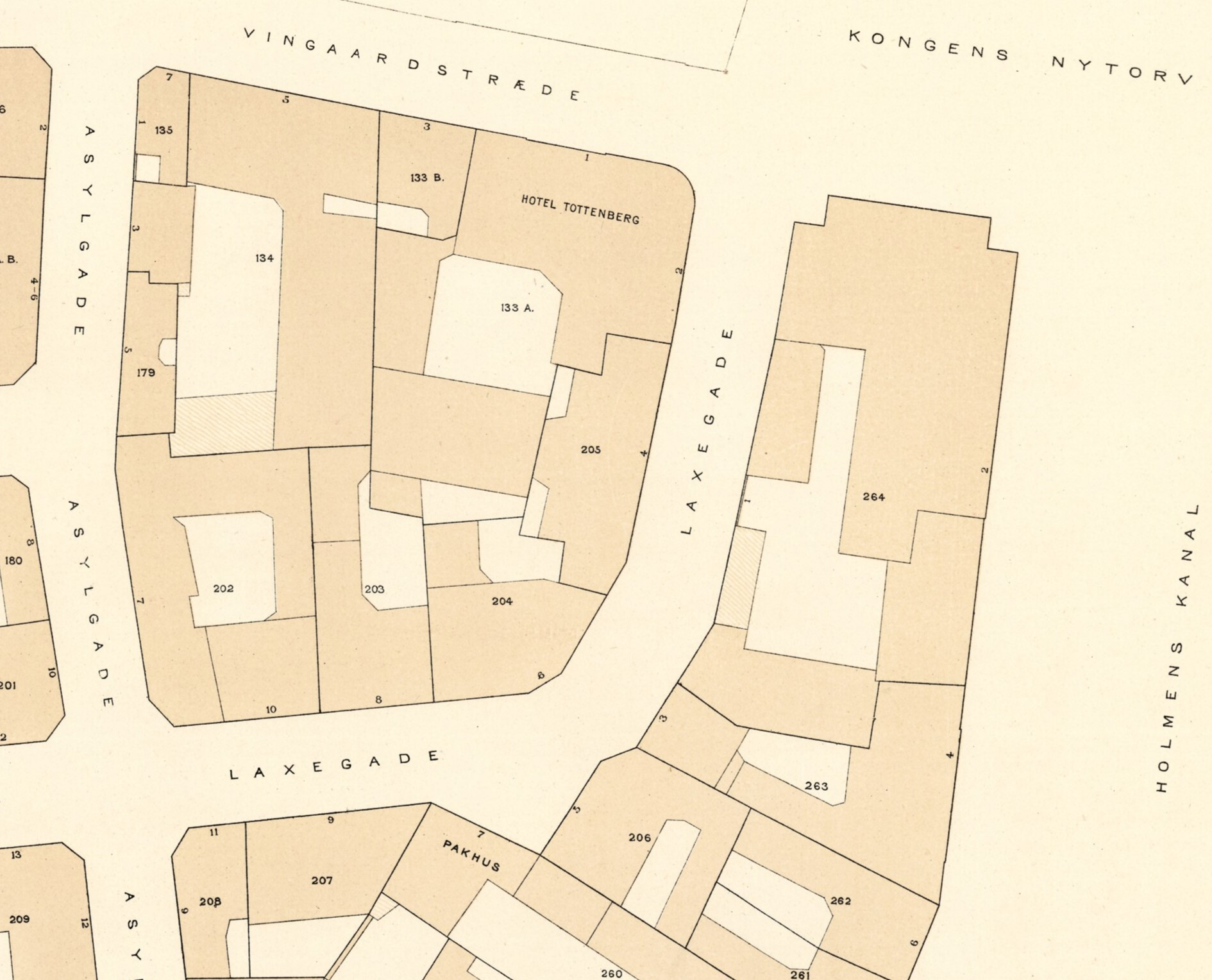
The property seen in a detail from one of Berggreen's block plans of Rastern Quarter, 1886–88.

The building has a central projection with Ionic order columns supporting a triangular pediment. The relief depicting Mercury and Minerva shaking hands over an altar was designed by G. D. Gianelli. According to Schaper, Harsdorff had opposed this design since free-standing columns were deemed too dominant in private house design.

The interior is richly decorated by the French architect Joseph-Jacques Ramée and the French painter Pierre Étienne Lesueur with murals and frescos in Pompeian style.
