= Pax intrantibus, salus exeuntibus =

Latin inscription

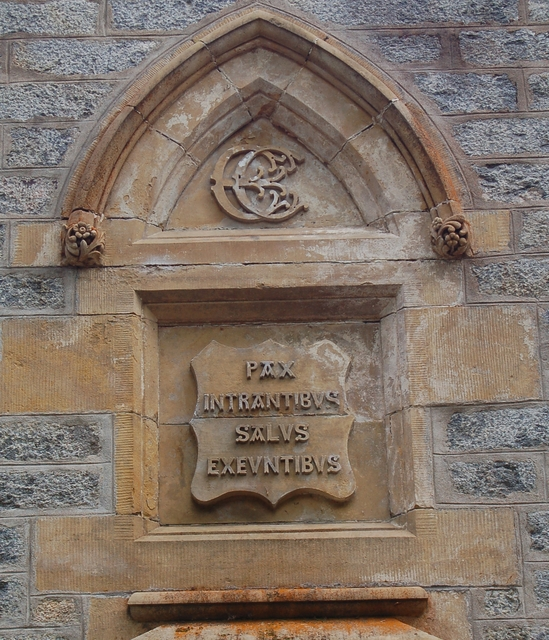
Motto on Glengarry Castle Lodge (Glengarry)

"Pax intrantibus, salus exeuntibus" (or variably "Intrantibus pax, exeuntibus salus") is a Latin phrase that is often translated into English as "Peace to those who enter, good health to those who depart." It often seen as an inscription at the entrances of Benedictine monasteries, schools, inns, on gates, and at the front door or vestibule of private homes. Sometimes salus is translated as "salvation."

On occasion, two additional words are added to the phrase, Benedictio habitantibus meaning "blessing on those who abide."

Other variations on the phrase include:

- Pacem intrantibus opto, meaning "I bid peace to all who enter here."
- Pax intrantibus et habitantibus meaning "peace to those who enter and abide here"
- Gaudeat ingrediens, laetetur et aede recedens, meaning "Joy as you come in, and joy as you go out."
- It is also similar to the blessing in Deuteronomy 28:6 "Blessed shalt thou be when thou comest in, and blessed shalt thou be when thou goest out." (King James Version), Benedictus eris tu ingrediens et egrediens (Vulgate)

== See also ==
- Epigraphy
- List of Latin phrases
