= Jørgen Henrich Rawert =

Danish architect (1751–1823)

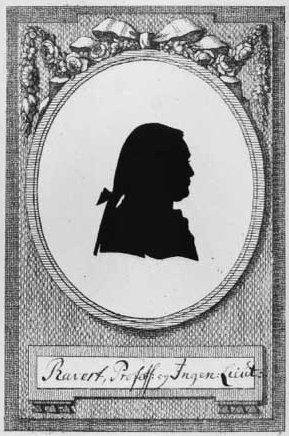
Jørgen Henrich Rawert

Jørgen Henrich Rawert was a (16 August 1751 – 14 July 1823) was a Danish architect. He created the masterplan for the rebuilding of Copenhagen after the Great Fire of 1795 in his capacity of a city architect and was also involved in many building projects, mostly townhouses, often collaborating with Andreas Hallander.

== Early life and education ==
Rawert was born in Christiania, where he became a cadet from the Military and Mathematical School in 1783. In 1775, he enrolled with the engineering troops in Copenhagen and moved to Denmark where he studied architecture under Caspar Frederik Harsdorff at the Royal Danish Academy of Fine Arts between 1776 and 1778, winning both the small and large silver medals. In 1779 and 1791 he unsuccessfully competed for the large gold medal which would have won him a travel scholarship.

== Career ==
He was a Second Lieutenant with the engineering troops from 1778 to 1786 and from 1783 a titular professor. In 1786, he returned to Christiania to serve as a teacher in mathematics at the Military and Mathematical School. His achievements as a designer are Norway is limited to the pulpit in the church in Skien and a few tombs and memorials.

In 1790, he returned to Copenhagen to assume a position as implementing architect for the city (Stadskonduktør). He was a key figure in the rebuilding of Copenhagen after the Great Fire of 1795 and again after the British bombardment of Copenhagen in 1807.

== Works ==
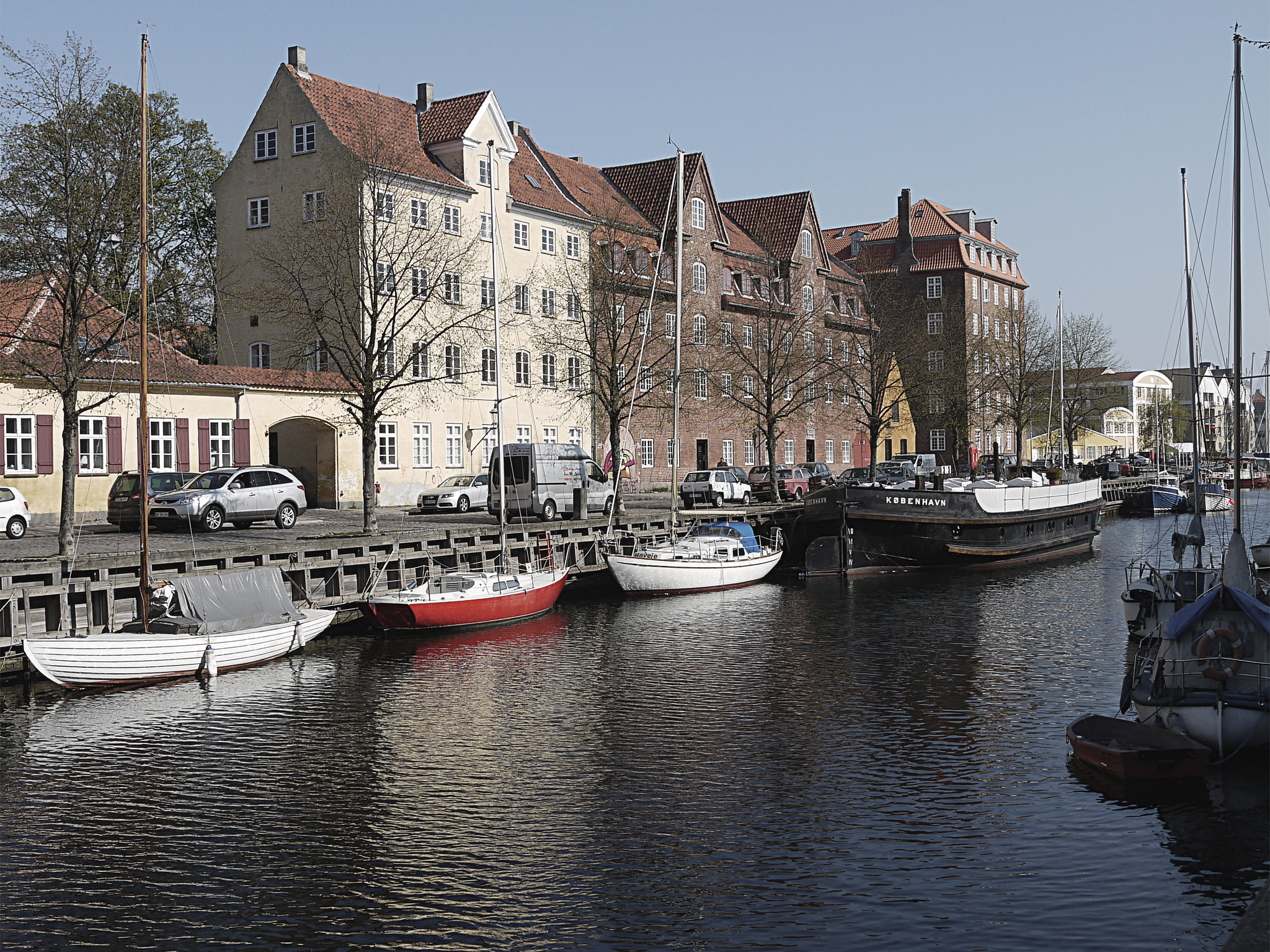
Wildersgade Barracks

Rawer's works in Copenhagen include a number of townhouses on Kronprinsessegade, two buildings on Sankt Annæ Plads, a building on Ved Stranden and Wildersgade Barracks:

- Kronprinsessegade 20 (1805–1806, with Andreas Hallander)
- Kronprinsessegade 26 (1805–1806)
- Kronprinsessegade 28 (1805–1806)
- Kronprinsessegade 30 (1806–1807)
- Kronprinsessegade 46-46a-e (1805-07 - s.m. Andreas Hallander)
- Sankt Annæ Plads 5 (1796)
- Sankt Annæ Plads 11 (1801)
- Ved Stranden 18 (1796, attribution)
- Wildersgade 60a-e-62 / Bådsmandsstræde 6 / Overgaden Neden Vandet 49a-c-51a-b (1802 - s.m. Andreas Hallander) - Wildersgade Kaserne
