= Baronda =

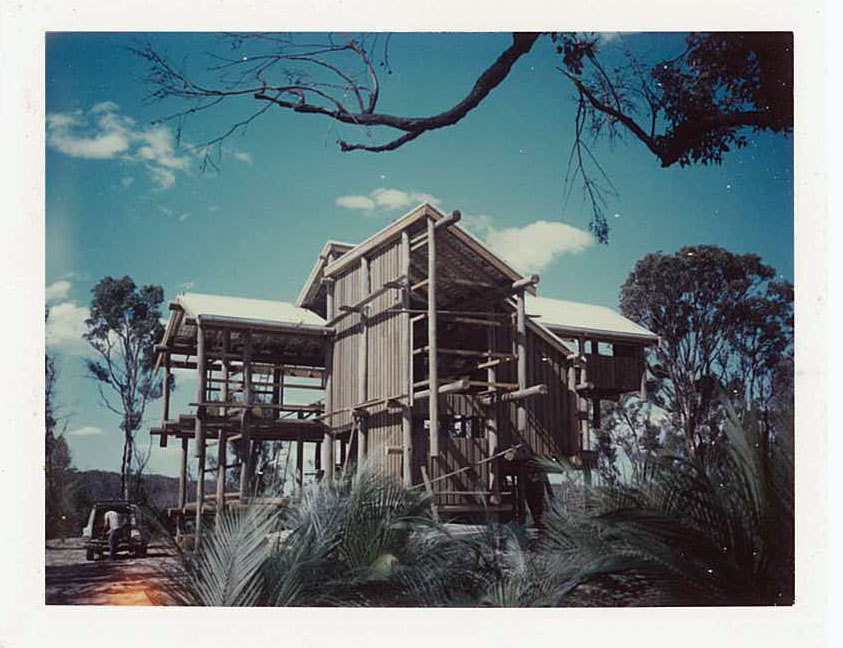
- Baronda residence under construction

- Location within New South Wales Location within Australia
- 36.6868°S 149.9897°E
- Location: Nelson Lake Road, Nelson Lagoon, Mimosa Rocks National Park, Tanja, Bega Valley Shire, New South Wales, Australia

History
- Built: 1968—1969
- Built for: David Yencken

Site notes
- Architect: Graeme Gunn
- Owner: NSW National Parks and Wildlife Service NPWS; Office of Environment and Heritage

New South Wales Heritage Register
- Official name: Baronda; Yencken House; Baronda Holiday House; Graeme Gunn designed house
- Type: state heritage (built)
- Designated: 29 November 2013
- Reference no.: 1915
- Type: House
- Category: Recreation and Entertainment
- Builders: Builder: Kingsley Koellner, Structural Engineer: Hamish Ransay

Baronda is a heritage-listed former holiday house in the Mimosa Rocks National Park on the South Coast of New South Wales, Australia. Located on Nelson Lake Road at Nelson Lagoon near the village of Tanja, it was designed by Graeme Gunn and built from 1968 to 1969 by Kingsley Koellner (builder) and Hamish Ramsay (structural engineer). It is also known as Yencken House, Baronda Holiday House and Graeme Gunn-designed house. The property is owned by the NSW National Parks and Wildlife Service and the NSW Office of Environment and Heritage. It was added to the New South Wales State Heritage Register on 29 November 2013.

== History ==
=== Aboriginal land ===
The far south coast of NSW was relatively densely populated by indigenous people, probably because of the abundant food sources obtainable from both land and sea. Separate cultural group stypically occupied each coastal valley, which were separated by steep forested hills with the Great Dividing Range forming a natural western boundary. The Bega Valley, where Baronda is situated, is associated with the Djiringanj people. Perhaps because of their relatively small traditional lands and the regularity of food supplies, the people of the south coast were generally less mobile than the Aboriginal people who lived in the interior

The first known contact between the indigenous people of this region and Europeans came as a result of the shipwreck of the Sydney Cove in early 1797. The ship originally foundered near Preservation Island off the east coast of Tasmania. A group of 17 sailors who set out for help in a row boat headed for Sydney were soon shipwrecked again, on the mid Victorian coast. They had little choice but to try to walk to Sydney, following the coast line. Only two of the 17 sailors survived this arduous trip. An account of their travels survives in the diary of the chief mate Mr W. Clark and was published in the Historical Records of Australia. The account describes many meetings between the sailors and coastal Aboriginal people they met on their journey, mostly friendly, some hostile. It has been suggested that one of the hostile encounters took place at Baronda when the Europeans stumbled into a sacred men's site resulting in the death of one of the sailors.

In 1798, an "amiable exchange of snacks" was recorded in the region, between Matthew Matthew Flinders and a middle aged indigenous man at Snug Cove in Twofold Bay near Eden. A later meeting at Snug Cove in 1803 resulted in violence, as did encounters to the north at Batemans Bay in 1808 and 1821. By the 1840s many Aboriginal men were working as agricultural labourers while Aboriginal women were being employed as domestic servants and often bearing the children of the occupiers. There were relatively good relations between white and Aboriginal workers in the whaling industry at Twofold Bay which meant that "local groups escaped the decimation which accompanied the progress of the pastoral frontier and enabled a certain continuity of traditional culture and social structure to be maintained".

=== Colonial and post colonial land ownership ===
In 1843 the former convict Fred Moon commenced farming sheep at the mouth of the Bega River near Baronda, on land that would later become known as "Riverview". Soon afterwards, in 1846, George Nelson and Jack Hayden constructed a hut at Nelson Lagoon with the aim of establishing a cattle grazing operation.

With the establishment of pastoral properties in the Bega Valley, land was being partitioned and sold for grazing or for orchards and gardens. The hinterland forests were logged for railway sleepers, pulpwood or sawlogs, native wildlife was hunted and creek lines scoured for gold. Later, holiday houses replaced huts and farmhouses. Former farms are now marked by clearings or regenerating bushland, fence lines or dams, weeds or ornamental plantings. Historic houses survive in some places, though in others they persist only as ruins.

The passage of the Crown Lands Alienation Act 1861 resulted in closer and more intensive settlement in the area. Between 1861 and 1878, more than 50 people selected land in the Nelson area and beyond. By the 1890s, virtually all of the coastal land between the Bega River and Goalen Head had been surveyed into portions and sold. At Bithry Inlet, and on the better soils around Goalen Head, the land was cleared and converted to dairy farms.

In 1872, the discovery of half an ounce of gold in a gully at Nelson Creek triggered a frenetic, albeit localised, gold rush. The valleys of Nelson and Sandy Creeks were quickly covered in mining claims and small quantities of alluvial gold were found. In the headwaters of Nelson Creek (also known as Diggers Creek), the miners excavated a race that diverted the flow of the creek, allowing the actual bed of the creek to be dug up in the search for gold. The activity in the district was sufficient for the Tanja/Nelson Goldfield to be declared the Dromedary Gold Field Extension South in 1879.

In 1886, the first oyster lease was issued for Nelson Lagoon. Mimosa Rocks National Park now protects most of the catchment of Nelson Creek, which is the principal tributary of Nelson Lagoon. Maintaining high water quality in the creek is vital to the health of the lagoon and this important oyster-growing area.

Historical records indicate that early settlers Thomas and William Russell owned the land to the south of Nelson Lagoon (also known historically as Nelson Lake and Baronda Lake). The earliest Parish Map available from 1896 shows that William Russell had the 75 acres (30 hectares) of land that was to be later owned by David Yencken and then incorporated into the park. Just to the south, William's brother Thomas Russell had adjoining land. They were sons of Thomas and Margaret Russell, originally from County Donegal, Ireland.

William Russell died in 1919 and Thomas Russell in 1952. Records from 1914 indicate a change in occupation with Henry Augustus Otton (born in 1838 in Wollongong), now owning the land formerly owned by William Russell. Otton's wife, Elizabeth, was the daughter of influential explorer, early settler and land owner in the Bega district, John Jauncey. By 1924, the Nelson Lagoon land was still shown as owned by Henry Otton although he had died in 1915 at his substantial property "Ottonville" near Bega. It is likely the land remained with the Otton family until at least 1934.

By the time David Yencken purchased the property in 1965, it was owned by a Mr Angus (first name unknown) who lived in the Mittagong area at the time. The settlement for the original 75 acres (30 hectares) of Portion 171 took place on 5 July 1965. Yencken had been looking for an "untouched" site, of "virgin bush". Despite its long history of freehold ownership, there is no remaining evidence that the lot had been cleared or occupied before Yencken's purchase.

The Yencken purchase was part of a new pattern of occupation of this region. In the late 1960s and early 1970s a number of prominent individuals from Melbourne bought a series of properties along the Mimosa Rocks coastline for the development of holiday houses. Penders at Bithry Inlet, for example, was bought by Sir Roy Grounds and Ken Myer. The "Araganui" property at Aragunnu Bay was acquired by Mr Kenneth Begg and the "Ness" property on the northern side of the mouth of Wapengo Lake was bought by Professor Manning Clark. Several of these new landowners soon initiated a local tradition of philanthropy in which they donated their lands to the park.

=== Pole beam timber architecture ===
In Australia, log cabin techniques and pole frame construction have been used since European occupation commenced in 1788. Throughout the 19th century, the use of poles and logs was extensive, first in house construction, but more frequently and with increasing sophistication in agricultural buildings and bridge structures. The use of log cabin construction diminished over the years as it was found that the hardness of the Australian timbers made such construction difficult. It was within the realm of high style architect-designed buildings that poles first made a reappearance in the 1930s, in the domestic architecture of Melbourne architect Roy Grounds.

The use of poles in the verandah and walkway columns of the Black Dolphin Motel, Merimbula, in 1958 was unusual at that time. Commissioned by David Yencken and designed by the acclaimed Melbourne architect Robin Boyd, the Black Dolphin also made use of unadorned brick panels and glazed infill. The use of such materials was part of a critical reaction against the polished and machine-inspired architecture of the 1950s. This was an aesthetic shift that was paralleled internationally by the rise of "New Brutalism", the move to natural and unadorned materials and honestly expressed structure. Roy Grounds' designs for the Barn and Myer House in the early 1960s nearby at Penders was another expression of this new aesthetic direction.

=== Baronda residence ===
In 1968, David Yencken commissioned Graeme Gunn, project architect on Robin Boyd's Black Dolphin Motel, to design a holiday house at Nelson Lagoon. Completed in 1969, it was called Baronda, presumably after a nearby geographical feature, Baronda Head. Peter Tonkin explains Yencken's purchase of the property and genesis of the design:

'Following [his work in developing] the Black Dolphin, David [Yencken] flew over the coast to find a remote, untouched parcel for a weekender. He negotiated for the purchase of the thirty-hectare site, nestled on an estuary near a surf beach, with virgin bush for miles around. . . The brief was for a simple two-bedroom house with the capacity to accommodate much larger groups in a sleep-out. After considerable "sweat", Graeme reached the design relatively quickly, producing sketches of a complex but resolved spiral of spaces reaching out to the landscape from a firm masonry core. While considerably larger than the brief, the design captivated the client - in David's words, "It had to be built!" and the work proceeded'.

In a letter supporting the SHR listing of Baronda on the SHR, David Yencken further described the genesis of the design for Baronda:

'When in 1967 I commissioned architect Graeme Gunn to design a house on land I had recently bought on Nelson Inlet just north of Tathra, both of us recognised that the site was of exceptional beauty, far beyond the ordinary, and thus deserved a work of real architectural significance as much as a functional dwelling. My then wife and I wanted a house that related to and was fully integrated into the bush setting of spotted gums and macrozamias that would surround it. We also wanted elevated living for views, a feeling of life among the trees and protection from sandflies. The brief was also clear about the limitations of our budget.
'The concept that Graeme brought back was for a structure that was at least double the size implied by the brief. In other circumstances I would have sent the concept drawings straight back and asked Graeme to redesign the house so that it would match our budget. But Graeme's concept was so imaginative and so compelling that we immediately decided that somehow or another the house had to be built.
'To reduce the cost significantly without any compromise to the basic design we decided to build the house without walls and doors. Later walls and doors could have been added. The house would have been equally striking if initially built in this way since the round pole post and beam structure would have been fully exposed to view. Plans, elevations and sections were submitted to the Building Inspector at the Mumbulla Council in this form. On 24 October 1967 the Building Inspector wrote back to state that the plans and specifications would not comply with Ordinance 71 under the Local Government Act in three ways. Related to the walls and doors he wrote:
'No provision has been made for the installation of glazed windows and doors. The absence of windows and doors would render the building unhealthy and the canvas blinds shown would not prevent the entry of dampness into the building.
'It was most questionable whether he was right in rejecting the application on this ground but because of the great difficulty of mounting an appeal in Sydney when both Graeme and I lived in Melbourne I eventually settled for the inclusion of walls and doors for the larger part of the house even if extra money had to be found to do this. One area was, however, left unenclosed.
'I tell this story to illustrate to what degree I was prepared to go to get the house built. Subsequently everyone who has been associated with the house has been captivated by it, starting from the builders and extending across people from all backgrounds.'

Thus Baronda was first designed as having no external or partition walls and no windows or glass – just canvas blinds, no doors except to bathrooms, no studs as we know them and no painting. The client David Yencken explained that the principal reason was to reduce costs and thereby enable the building of such a magnificent structure, so much larger and more expansive than the brief had called for, without comprising the design. Vandalism was also a factor in such a remote location. The house was subsequently built to conform to council regulations, complete with doors and windows, although one area was left unenclosed. Vandalism did occur before caretaker arrangements were put in place. There is still no mains electricity connection although a stand-alone solar system is installed. Water is collected from the roof and stored in an underground concrete tank, and the house is serviced by bottled gas and a septic tank.

In 1976 Yencken and Gunn described the house as: "a concentrated form, elevated to make the best of the marvellous views and to obtain relief from the dreaded sand fly. Its planning arrangement is reflected in a series of interlocked platforms, each stepped 1370mm above each other and achieving a modicum of privacy through the vertical separation provided. It is a tree house which offers views of the inlet and the coastline and which suggests a relationship with the tree tops... it uses a limited range of materials in a simple and straightforward, nearly crude manner... an appropriate result in terms of natural surroundings".

Tonkin describes the design as 'like an occupiable construction toy - a complete vertical and horizontal grid of nine-foot modules defined by the framework of massive, round tree trunks. Each level of the house rises a half module - four fee six inches - above the last, creating a complex spiral of spaces climbing around the brick core. The design thus reflects one of the obsessions of the period, where module and repetition were central to the intellectual and practical manipulation of material into architecture. This machine-like layer of standardization was seen to smooth over the handcrafted nature of building with a more contemporary suggestion of mass production. The composition can be likened to a systematized Fallingwater [a famous modern American house] crossed with a log cabin rising from a level site in the bush. It is just as daringly cantilevered and nearly as complex spatially. And like Frank Lloyd Wright's Fallingwater, it succeeds in the difficult design task of enlargement - a small house grown in scale and apparent size by the included architectural joinery, by the complexity of interlocking volume and by the variation of prospect and light'

The light inside the house moves diagonally through the main spaces. This light is described as a dark brown due to the tone of the timbers, an effect most commonly seen in old agricultural sheds with timber interiors. Academic architect Alex Selenitsch describes the residence in his 'Baronda narratives':

'Imagine a house which is a roof held up in the air. The roof is held up on columns, which are set out in a grid, equally spaced and, initially, set out as a square field. Some of the columns rise higher to support the ridge of the roof, one or two is replaced by a chimney. In a corner or two, the grid is extended to expand the interior of the house. Inside, some columns have been removed to free up the space'.

Baronda was featured soon after its completion in the landmark book edited by Ian Mackay and others, Living & Partly Living, published in 1971. This publication "anthologised the new humanism in housing with its expression of identity through house form, the suburban culturisation of the bush. . .". Architect Peter Tonkin compared Baronda with the American Modern Movement icon, 'Fallingwater':

'The composition can be likened to a systematised Fallingwater crossed with a log cabin rising from a site in the bush. It is just as daringly cantilevered and nearly as complex spatially. And like Frank Lloyd Wright's Fallingwater, it succeeds in the difficult design task of enlargement - a small house grown in scale and apparent size by the included architectural journey, by the complexity of interlocking volumes and by the variation of prospect and light. . . [Baronda] is a kind of icon of the late 1960s, with its progressive structuralist form, flowing spaces and machine-like diagram, as well as its pioneering environmental self-sufficiency.'

Graeme Gunn has been recognised for his achievements in architecture with the Royal Australian Institute of Architects (RAIA) Gold Medal, Australia's top architectural accolade. The Melbourne-based architect is admired for seeking "better housing for all Australians" and "improving our housing and urban environments". As early as 1963 Robin Boyd included Gunn's Shoebridge House in his pamphlet "The new architecture". Gunn's startling Richardson house, an atrium house of Roman severity built in a suburb of Melbourne, won the Victorian Architecture Medal in 1966. Gunn is now best known for his role as principal architect for VicUrban, as foundation dean of the Faculty of Architecture and Building at RMIT and for his early innovative housing work with Merchant Builders in Melbourne, which he established with Yencken after building Baronda. The Gold Medal confirmed Gunn's status as an architect of national significance in Australia.

David Yencken has also been widely recognised for his contributions to the environment and heritage in Australia. He was the founder of Merchant Builders and Tract Consultants (Victoria's equivalent of Pettit Sevitt), first Chair of the Australian Heritage Commission (set up in 1975 as the first Commonwealth government body to define and protect Australia's heritage), first Chair of Australia ICOMOS (the peak society of heritage professionals), Secretary of the Planning and Environment Department in Victoria between 1982 and 1987, member of the Australia National Commission for UNESCO, President of the Australian Conservation Foundation, Chair of the Design Committee of the Australia Council, founder and chair of The Australian Collaboration and former head of the School of Environmental Planning at the University of Melbourne where he remains Professor Emeritus. He represented Australia twice at World Heritage Committee meetings. The honorary doctorate conferred on him by the University of Melbourne in 2012 stated:

'For more than 50 years, Professor David Yencken has been a champion for the Australian environment, the nation's heritage and excellence in design. Working in industry, politics and academia, especially through his association with the University of Melbourne, he has been a staunch advocate and activist, promoting better outcomes for strategic policy, innovation in implementation, design and practice across our cities and landscapes.
'He has been recognised through a number of major prizes and awards, including the Queen's Silver Jubilee Medal, the Planning Institute of Australia Lifetime achievement award, and the Lord Mayor's Prize 2001. He is an Honorary Fellow of the Planning Institute of Australia and the Australian Institute of Landscape Architects, and in 1982, he was made an Officer of the Order of Australia for services to conservation and history.'

=== Baronda and the National Park ===
As early as 1861, following the passage of the Crown Lands Alienation Act 1861, an area between Mogareeka and the southern shore of Nelson Lagoon was declared a water reserve under the provisions of the Crown Lands Alienation Act 1861 (although this reservation was subsequently revoked in 1893). Land on the southern side of the entrance to Middle Lagoon was also dedicated a recreation reserve in 1881. An area at Bunga Head was reserved from sale for public recreation and the preservation of native flora in 1933, while the area previously gazetted as a water reserve at Nelson Lagoon was set aside for public recreation and as a "resting place" in 1939.

In the late 1960s, members of the Far South Coast Conservation League, National Parks Association (NPA) and the Coast and Mountain Walkers began campaigning for a coastal national park between Tathra and Bermagui. The early efforts of conservation groups were rewarded on 13 April 1973 when an area of 628 hectares located between Bunga Head and Picnic Point was gazetted as Mimosa Rocks National Park. This original reservation consisted of an amalgamation of six adjoining parcels of Crown Land that had previously been reserved from sale for public recreation, the preservation of native flora or village purposes.

Since this initial modest reservation twenty separate additions have been made to the park, consisting of former public reserves, vacant Crown land, trig reserves, state forest, donations of freehold land, and land purchased by the State government. Thus the initial park reservation was promptly followed by two donations of private land. In 1973, Sir Roy Grounds and Mr Ken Myer offered their property named Penders to the government on the basis that it be reserved as national park. The property, covering 220 hectares, included a two kilometre frontage to the Pacific Ocean and bushland stretching from Middle Beach to Bithry Inlet.

In the same year, David Yencken offered his Baronda property, covering 30 hectares at Nelson Lagoon, for the same purpose. These two additions were critical in establishing core areas of the national park that would subsequently be added to and joined to create a viable conservation reserve. The transfer of the land did not occur immediately and spanned a period of three successive Ministers. The donation agreement was finalised in December 1976. The land included the whole of portion 171, however the area leased back to David Yencken enclosed two hectares of land containing the house and surrounding bushland.

Publicity generated by the Bega District Forest Action Council and other conservation groups resulted in the State government establishing the Advisory Committee on South Coast Woodchipping (subsequently known as the Ashton Committee) in 1977. In accordance with the recommendations of the committee, 3,600 hectares of the Nelson and Middle Lagoon catchments in Tanja State Forest were added to the park in 1982. In the following year, an area of state forest behind Aragunnu Beach was also incorporated into the park.

Gazetted into the park on 25 May 1979 was an area that totalled 550 hectares and included Yencken's gifted land and the adjoining Crown land at Wajurda Point, as well as the Penders property and land near Gillards Beach. The whole Nelson Creek catchment, parts of the Sandy Creek catchment, and Baronda Head were added later in 1982.

A number of additional freehold properties were acquired by the NSW government during the 1990s under the Coastal Lands Protection Scheme, which had been established in 1973 to purchase coastal areas that possessed significant cultural or natural heritage values. Properties acquired under the scheme and added to the park included the 16 hectare "Araganui" block at Aragunnu Beach, the 34 hectare "Riverview" property at Mogareeka Inlet, and the 105 hectare "Hidden Valley" property north of Bunga Head.

Other additions to the park during the 1990s included 160 hectares of Mumbulla State Forest at Doctor George Mountain in 1997, and three parcels of Crown land that were incorporated into the park in 1999 as an outcome of the Eden Regional Forestry Agreement.

The history of private individuals donating land to the park continued into recent times. The 37 hectare "Texas" property at Tanja, which was added to the park in 1996, was bequeathed by the late Ken Myer, while other neighbours (including Roy Grounds' son Marr), have donated land that was added to the park in 2001 and 2002. An area of 104 hectares of land at Goalen Head was purchased under the Coastal Lands Protection Scheme and incorporated into the park in 2001. It added a further 3 kilometres of coastline to the park.

=== Testimonials for Baronda ===
Peter Tonkin (architect) wrote in 2010: 'The house at Baronda Head is a kind of icon of the late 60s, with its progressive structuralist form, flowing spaces and machine-like diagram, as well as its pioneering environmental self-sufficiency. . . It is also an architectural symbol of the wider, and far more significant, effort of a few enlightened individuals in establishing the 5,800-hectare Mimosa Rocks National Park. It is an appropriate symbol, in that it has literally grown from its site, using the timber from the land, processed locally.'

Max Bourke AM (founding CEO of the Australian Heritage Commission): "[Baronda] is not only one of the great (though small) works of one of Australia's great architects of the 20th century, its integration into the landscape set it as a benchmark for that objective. Frequently one hears about projects aimed at maximising the integration of design of a building into a specific environment, very rarely is it achieved as well as it is here. The structure is not only completely IN the environment it is OF the environment in every sense. Its construction using local timbers, processed in the district set it up as an exemplar for ambitions to achieve environmental harmony. When the Australian Heritage Commission was being established in the mid-1970s this building was the site of several significant meetings which set the future for that body. While architecture or rather buildings should not always seek to "disappear" into an environment this building is and does. Today it is so integrated with the Corymbia maculate / Macrozamia communis ecosystem which surrounds it one can almost imagine its "spontaneous" creation. I believe this building will come to represent, in itself, the aspirations of the architects of the mid-20th century to achieve "harmony with nature" in a way that few others do."

Chris Brennan-Horley and Alexandra Madden (caretaker/residents since 2010): 'The house is well known amongst the Bega Valley community for its role in the creation of Mimosa Rocks National Park. As Nelsons Beach and Lagoon are a popular recreational space for locals and tourists, its visual presence signifies the efforts made by the Yencken family towards the development of the park. Furthermore, the house itself is part of the gift bequeathed to the people of NSW, not just the land upon which it sits. . . Those who have had the privilege of spending any amount of time either within the house or on the grounds remain in awe of its architectural qualities and position in the landscape. . . [Baronda has] iconic status as an important cultural landmark in the local area.'

Robert Bruce, Michael O'Brien and Warren Nicholls (all former staff members of the Australian Heritage Commission): 'We all worked for the Australian Heritage Commission . . . [including] attending meetings at Baronda in 1976 at which . . . those first, formative directions for the commission were discussed and the embryo of the Register of the National Estate began its life. The development of the Register of the National Estate was a ground breaking exercise that entailed the listing of the Nation's natural and cultural heritage places and included places having heritage significance at the local, State and National level, a task never attempted, to our knowledge, in any other country before or since. We can all testify to the Associative heritage significance stemming from those very early days of the Commission . . . The building blends beautifully with its environment of spotted gum and burrawang forest so that it is not visible until you are upon the place. This is remarkable for a 3-storey, 5 level building and is achieved through the use of local materials in its construction . . . we know of no other place that is built to such an unusual and eye-catching design, that functions perfectly for its intended function and blends so sensitively within a dense coastal forest giving views to surrounding forest and water yet remain almost invisible from the water or the forest.'

Keith Cottier AM (architect): "The building was highly influential within the architectural profession when it was first constructed, being so concerned with integration with its surrounding landscape yet preoccupied with a repetitive construction module. Constructed of local materials, it is a rare example of a building that is almost of its environment rather than in it. In addition its internal form also seems wonderfully appropriate for the setting, the interlocking volumes breaking away from any domestic model, and working for both small and large groups of people . . . It truly is a wonderful but rare pioneering example of environmental sustainability".

Anne Cunningham (architect): 'One of my favourite areas has always been the grand forests of spotted gum, Corymbia malacuta, which surround Baronda. Driving through them on the sandy track to Baronda one is struck by the unusual dominance of this species. When the house is reached the strength of form and the dark bold structure (tanalith treated spotted gum), make it seem such a natural fit in its surroundings. There is nothing jarring, no feeling out-of-placeness. Proceeding to the interior you certainly feel that Graeme Gunn, the architect, must have used the analogy of climbing a tree with the series of half floor stairs spirally linking the five levels. At first it appears quite dark and your eyes need to adjust between the intriguingly designed internal spaces and the openings with tantalising views of the surrounding forest and the occasional glimpses of sea and coastline. Baronda is also an important early example of passive and active environmental design. This is an extraordinary dwelling; the successful outcome of a client, architect and builder who shared values of understanding of place, beauty, courage and farsightedness.'

Kel Jamieson (local community member who lived at Baronda for 16 years): '[Baronda] is a well known and treasured construction that deserves protection as a major work of Australian culture . . . a local icon . . . The House has been successfully utilised for a variety of educational and environmental works which adds another dimension to its value. For many years I have worked with students from local schools at Baronda using the house as a stimulus to study creative design and construction of man-made structures. I have also won a federal government award for Environmental Education where all my work was completed at Baronda. Students from Tathra Public School have won two major state environmental competitions working out of Baronda. I am heavily involved in the Tathra/ Bega Valley community and through local conversation and interaction I am in a position to vouch for local sentiment to support the proposal to list this treasure on the NSW Heritage List.'

Jane Lennon AM (heritage consultant): '[In the early 1970s] there was much emphasis on sympathetic environmental design where development was permitted. Baronda seemed the epitome of this as a pole house secluded in its superb bushland setting. As senior planner at the Victorian National Park Service this exposure to sensitive design in the work of Graeme Gunn, Ellis Stones and others using local materials influenced some of our subsequent work for incorporating the bushland into the siting and design of facilities . . . [Baronda] is one of the significant small works of one of Australia's leading architects of the second half of the 20th century. Its design and integration into the landscape set it as a benchmark for environmental design . . . [It] represents the aspirations of the architects of the mid-20th century to achieve "harmony with nature" in an Australian coastal setting - similar to McHarg's Design With Nature international trend exemplified by many California remote coastal beach houses - in a way few others do. It is a treasure'.

Jack Miller AM (local community member): Jack Miller AM (local community member): My first association with Baronda was in 1976 when I there approached owner David Yencken, on behalf of a large local community group, for his assistance as chairman of the Australian Heritage Commission in helping in our struggle to curb the planned intensive logging (woodchip) operations into the fragile Nelson Lake catchment forests. David was not only generous with his time, but also offered the use of the house to use for occasional meetings. It was a welcome refuge in the face of often uncomfortable action towards us by some persons closely associated with the woodchip industry. Subsequently, I was appointed by the NSW Cabinet to a committee chaired by Nigel Ashton to enquire into woodchipping. Recommendations of that committee, delivered to Cabinet in 1978 and adopted by the Wran Government, saw Nelsons Lake and several other coastal catchments transfer from State Forest into National park. Our memorable celebrations were held in Baronda House . . . As Principal of an Environmental Studies Centre and through work on a local district National Parks Advisory Committee, a local State Park Trust, local Bushfire Brigade and as a local Shire councillor I became increasingly aware of the community's general awareness of and in many cases, pride in - the house. Professional planning staff during this period informed me further of its local and probably regional significance. I came to regard it as Bega Valley Shire's most significant building.

Barbara Norman (Foundation Chair of Urban & Regional Planning, university of Canberra): 'The listing of [Baronda] will be a very proper conclusion to a process that has involved excellence in building, innovation and active engagement of leading Australian intellectuals collectively making a highly significant contribution to the south coast region, Australian coastal architecture and its place within the coastal environment. Baronda embodies all of these qualities.'

Tim Shannon (Professor and Honorary Professional Fellow in Architecture, University of Melbourne): 'I submit that there are at least four areas of significance to Australian Architectural history that Baronda makes. First, it is an example of Architecture that is to be experienced and responded to, it is Architecture that reaches human emotions. Secondly, it makes a remarkable contribution to the evolution of our understanding of an Australian Architecture in its Australian landscape. Thirdly, it is a remarkably preserved example of Architectural thinking of the mid-twentieth century, which can be experienced as well as examined. Finally it is a testament to the pioneering spirit and perseverance of David Yencken, Robin Boyd, and Graeme Gunn who have spent so much of their professional lives pursuing their belief in the value that Architecture can bring to the family home . . . Baronda is an essay in the artistic entwining of a place to live with the landscape that it occupies, and in so doing offers a remarkable experience of its setting, and it legacy lies in its ability to illustrate the power of the Australian setting on the Architecture that responsibly addresses its challenges.'

Richard Silink (heritage architect): 'Baronda is worthy of listing on the SHR as a seminal residential work of RAIA Gold Medal recipient Graham Gunn. The house is substantially intact and has remained with the original owner since construction. The quality of the design of the "nuts and berries" style dwelling is worthy of State level recognition. While deliberately crude in materials, it is highly refined in the spaces that were created through the masterful manipulation of the 9x9 foot module. The strikingly robust design using large vertical hardwood posts and beams combined with a palette of muted colours has resulted in a building that sits both confidently and harmoniously in its forested landscape setting.'

Alexander Tzannes AM (Professor and Dean, Faculty of the Built Environment, UNSW): 'Baronda itself is an important work of architecture, representing social values and design ideas particular to time and place with an exceptional level of clarity. A state level heritage listing of Baronda is warranted to enrich the understanding of Australia's built environment culture for future generations. It is a rare example of a way of thinking translated into architecture that embodies ideas of another era that in my view have continuing relevance.'

Peter Watts AM (former CEO of the Historic Houses Trust of NSW): 'I would like to emphasise the role this property played in the early days of the formation of the professional conservation movement in Australia. Early meetings, discussions and debates about the formation of Australia ICOMOS and the Australian Heritage Commission took place in this house with many early conservationists being regular guests. It was a place for the incubation of ideas, encouraged by the high ideals, energy, wisdom and foresight of its owner, David Yencken. Many people who went on to become the leaders of the natural and cultural heritage movements in Australia developed and honed their ideas and principles at Baronda, with its wonderful house and surrounded by an exceptionally fine landscape - the two welded together in total harmony.'

Rodney T. Wulff and Steve Calhoun (founding directors Tract Consultants, Professorial Fellows at the University of Melbourne): 'On separate occasions we have had the good fortune and pleasure of staying in this wonderful dwelling and experiencing the landscape in which it is so sensitively sited . . . [As] landscape architects we believe the building and its setting to be of tremendous importance to our cultural and natural heritage.'

As the commissioning client and long-term lessee, Professor David Yencken AO wrote a letter of support for the SHR listing of Baronda stating: 'When the lease is surrendered I am very pleased to know that the house will be in the care of the NSW National Park and Wildlife Service. If the Heritage Council determines to recommend listing to the Minister and the Minister accepts this recommendation, as I hope will happen, it would be a very welcome conclusion to my direct involvement with the site and this splendid house. 'Finally, while it is not for me to make judgements about the comparative architectural qualities of the house in a NSW context, I have nevertheless had the good fortune of working with many of Australia's leading architects during my life and many of the buildings with which I have been associated have won architectural awards and have been given heritage listings in other jurisdictions. The Baronda House is in my opinion at least the equal of the best of these buildings.'

== Description ==
=== Landscape context ===
The Baronda residence is located on the southern bank of Nelson Lagoon in Mimosa Rocks National Park, five kilometres north of the township of Tathra and 22 kilometres south of Bermagui, on the far south coast of NSW approximately midway between Sydney and Melbourne. The section of the park that includes the Baronda residence protects most of the catchment of Nelson Creek, which is the principal tributary of Nelson Lagoon. It is a site of great natural scenic beauty, combining both bushland and coastal landscapes.

Managed by the National Parks & Wildlife Service of the NSW State Government, the Mimosa Rocks National Park covers 5,804 hectares and extends for 20 kilometres along the coast from the mouth of the Bega River to the southern shore of Bunga Lagoon. The park has a varied history of European occupation and use. Evidence remains of pastoral, timber harvesting, gold mining and recreational ventures, with places such as the former "Riverview" and "Penders" properties containing features of Indigenous and non-Indigenous significance.

The Baronda residence on its historic 30-hectare (74-acre) lot was designed by Graeme Gunn, completed in 1969 and donated to the NSW Government for inclusion into the national park in 1976. Since then, the house in a 2-hectare (4.9-acre) curtilage had been leased back to the original client and donor, Professor David Yencken. These two hectares form the proposed curtilage for the SHR listing of the place.

Baronda and Penders heralded a crop of innovative, Modern Movement coastal retreats which have been constructed in this region since the 1960s. These include Neville Quarry's house at Boydtown, Philip and Louise Cox's house Thubbul and Daryl Jackson's house at Bermagui, as well as pole framed houses designed by Russell Hall in the 1970s, Martin Fowler in the 1980s and Clinton Murray in the 1990s. Robin Boyd's Black Dolphin Motel in Merimbula, for which Graeme Gunn was project architect in the late 1950s, provided a crucial precedent for this flowering of Modern Movement design in this region.

=== Baronda residence ===
The Baronda residence is a three-storey post and beam timber house over five levels, designed by Graeme Gunn, a Melbourne architect with a national reputation. Designs for Baronda were begun in 1968 and the house was completed in 1969. It has been described as "a complex but resolved spiral of spaces reaching out to the landscape from a firm masonry core".

The timber pole framework, a horizontal and vertical grid structure of Tanalith-treated log columns, consists of pressure-treated spotted gum sourced from the local spotted gum forests. The exterior and interior cladding consists of stringy bark, also from local forests. The vertical and horizontal poles are all on a 2.75 metre (or 9 foot) grid. The house is given its richness of form externally by cantilevered extensions and varied rooflines, and internally by the half level 1.37 metre (4'6") changes and by its large spaces and high ceilings.

Each habitable zone is positioned at half level intervals radiating from a central staircase and landings. This provides three large spaces of increasing protection and privacy as one moves up the levels. A separation of service rooms in a rear lean-to zone is an echo of the iconic Australian outhouse. Outdoor decks are prominent on the north and east elevations and extend from the main habitable areas. A smaller balcony is accessed from the main bedroom. The cantilevers define various spaces including the upper-most bedroom (or study) which juts out 2.7m from the main structure.

The house was first designed as having no bearers or floor joists, no partition walls, no windows or glass (just canvas blinds), no doors except to bathrooms, no studs as we know them and no painting. Graeme Gunn explained the reason for having no doors or windows was a response to concerns about the risk of vandalism in a place that might be empty for long periods. The house was subsequently built to conform to council regulations, complete with doors and windows, and vandalism has occurred at times. There is still no mains electricity connection although a stand-alone solar system is installed. Water is collected from the roof and stored in an underground concrete tank, and the house is serviced by bottled gas and a septic tank.

Tonkin explains: 'Its minimalism of material is a further defining character. There are really only three materials, internally and externally: the Australian hardwood, the unpainted bagged brick and the "Super 6" fibre cement roof'.

The rustic finishes internally and externally are considered significant, as are the interior fixed elements such as stairways and fireplaces.

A low rustic "engine shed" made of similar materials to the house, sited in the bushland about 10 metres from the house, dates from the original time of construction of the house and is considered significant. The ground level rectangular water tank near the house is of low significance.

The building was reported to retain its original integrity in design and materials and be highly intact as at 18 June 2013. Since construction of the house there has been only minor maintenance and some structural strengthening, with no major alterations or additions in over forty years. David Yencken attributes this level of structural integrity, extending even to the poles embedded in the ground, to having sought advice from the CSIRO when preparing the timber during construction. The underground water tank, septic and generator housing all remain at the same location. The vehicle access from the Nelson Beach Road has not changed since the house was constructed.

New timber steps to access Nelson Lagoon were added c. 2012

== Heritage listing ==
Baronda is of state significance for its aesthetic qualities as an innovative, Modern Movement residential design harmoniously positioned in a remote coastal location of great scenic beauty. Dating from 1969, the Baronda residence is a distinguished early example of the work of the eminent Australian architect Graeme Gunn. It is modest and experimental but accomplished in its use of natural materials and rustic finishes and in its sculptural manipulation of the living spaces in the form of a geometric spiral with rectangular projections. It is ecologically sensitive in drawing its materials from the local environment while maximising the views to surrounding bush and lagoon.

Baronda is of state significance for its associations with its original client, Professor David Yencken, an advocate for protection of both natural and cultural environments in Australia. Baronda was the site of some of the early formative meetings of the Australian Heritage Commission of which Yencken was the founding chair. It has significant associations with the eminent Australian artist, Fred Williams who painted his "Baronda" series of landscapes when staying at the house. There is also the association with its designer Graeme Gunn, a distinguished AIA Gold Medal bearing architect who later holidayed at the house. It is rare as one of the few Gunn designs built in NSW.

Baronda is also of state significance as an important representative example of the new postwar building type, the holiday house, using an experimental approach of living in ecological harmony with the Australian climate and landscape. Baronda is representative of several stages of European occupation of coastal NSW, from pastoral settlement and alluvial gold mining to the development of holiday retreats. The donation of Baronda by David Yencken to the state of NSW for inclusion in the Mimosa Rocks National Park was a representative philanthropic gesture, echoed nearby by others such as Roy Grounds and Kenneth Myer's donation of Penders, which contributes to the ongoing preservation of the natural environment and an expression of belief in public ownership of coastal lands.

Baronda was listed on the New South Wales State Heritage Register on 29 November 2013 having satisfied the following criteria.

The place is important in demonstrating the course, or pattern, of cultural or natural history in New South Wales.

Baronda residence, dating from 1969, is of local historical significance as an early and intact example of a high quality, architect-designed private holiday house on the NSW far south coast. It is one of the early and leading postwar exemplars of innovative and ecologically sensitive architectural experiments in a landscape setting, mostly designed by Melbourne architects.

The place has a strong or special association with a person, or group of persons, of importance of cultural or natural history of New South Wales's history.

Baronda is of state significance for its associations with its original client, Professor David Yencken, an outstanding advocate for protection of both natural and cultural environments in Australia, and for being the site of some of the early formative meetings of the Australian Heritage Commission of which Yencken was the founding chair.

The house is also of State significance as an admired domestic design by architect Graeme Gunn, one of his few major design works located outside Victoria. Gunn, one of Australia's most distinguished architects, has been the winner of many architectural awards including several Australian Institute of Architects bronze medals (the highest building award given by the Victorian Chapter) and the Australian Institute of Architects Gold Medal (the highest designer award given by the national chapter).

The house is also of significance for its association with the famous Australian landscape artist, Fred Williams, who worked on his "Baronda" series when staying at the house. Some of these gouache drawings are held by the British Museum.

The property also has associations of local significance with early settlers including the Russell family who emigrated from Ireland and the Otton and Jauncey families.

The place is important in demonstrating aesthetic characteristics and/or a high degree of creative or technical achievement in New South Wales.

Baronda is of state significance for its qualities as an innovative, Modern Movement house in a scenic, remote coastal location. The Baronda residence is an early example of the work of Australian architect Graeme Gunn, whose design used natural materials with minimalist detailing, and was ecologically sensitive in drawing its materials from the local environment. It is notable in its sculptural manipulation of the living spaces in the form of a geometric spiral with rectangular projections, while maximizing views of surrounding bush, lagoon and ocean. Baronda shows development of the theme of spotted gum log construction initiated by Melbourne architect Robin Boyd in his construction of the Black Dolphin Motel nearby in Merimbula in 1958.

The place has a strong or special association with a particular community or cultural group in New South Wales for social, cultural or spiritual reasons.

Responses to the proposed listing of Baronda on the SHR suggest that the place is of social significance to the local community of the Bega Valley, at least as a fine house in a beautiful location and a place where community groups have met on occasion for a variety of "educational and environmental works". One submission by a local leader proposed it is 'Bega Valley Shire's most significant building'.

The place has potential to yield information that will contribute to an understanding of the cultural or natural history of New South Wales.

Baronda is of significance for its research potential firstly to enable visitors to experience a high quality mid-twentieth century Modern Movement architectural design, secondly to allow study of its integral relationship with its natural environment, thirdly to enable researchers to stay in an ecologically sensitive building within a national park to order to study the natural attributes of the park itself.

The place possesses uncommon, rare or endangered aspects of the cultural or natural history of New South Wales.

Baronda residence at Nelson Lagoon is of state significance as a rare building of its type in NSW and an early, innovative design in high quality, experimental pole construction. It is rare in NSW as a substantial design work by Graeme Gunn, a leading Victorian architect with few known designs in NSW. The highly distinctive and unusual timber structure of the building is rare as an early example of a Modern Movement building constructed with ecological sensitivity within a natural landscape.

The place is important in demonstrating the principal characteristics of a class of cultural or natural places/environments in New South Wales.

Baronda is of state significance as a representative example of the new building type of the holiday house which was introduced to NSW during the 1950s. Baronda, along with the similarly innovative holiday houses designed by Roy Grounds at nearby Penders, provide outstanding early examples of the growing number of elegant holiday retreats built since the end of World War II on the NSW coast. Baronda, like the Barn at Penders, represents an idealised way of living in the Australian climate and landscape. The house is significant as an example of an environmentally responsive holiday house that demonstrates the principal characteristics of timber pole construction within NSW.

Baronda is also of state representative significance for demonstrating several stages of European occupation of coastal NSW, from pastoral settlement and alluvial gold mining to the development of holiday retreats. The donation of Baronda by David Yencken to the State of NSW for inclusion in the Mimosa Rocks National Park was an important, representative philanthropic gesture, echoing Roy Grounds' and Kenneth Myer's donation of Penders, which contributes to the ongoing preservation of the natural environment and an expression of belief in public ownership of coastal lands.
