= Goodenia krauseana =

Scientific classification
- Kingdom: Plantae
- Clade: Tracheophytes
- Clade: Angiosperms
- Clade: Eudicots
- Clade: Asterids
- Order: Asterales
- Family: Goodeniaceae
- Genus: Goodenia
- Species: G. krauseana

Binomial name
- Goodenia krauseana Carolin

Synonyms
- Goodenia nana K.Krause nom.illeg.

Species of plant

Goodenia krauseana is a species of flowering plant in the family Goodeniaceae and is endemic to part of Western Australia. It is a prostrate to ascending herb densely covered with silvery bristles, and has lance-shaped leaves at the base, sometimes with a few teeth on the edges, and small groups of yellow flowers with a brownish centre.

== Description ==
Goodenia krauseana is a prostrate to ascending herb densely covered with silvery bristles, and has stems up to 20 cm (7.9 in) long. It has lance-shaped leaves at the base, 30–70 mm (1.2–2.8 in) long and 3–10 mm (0.12–0.39 in) wide, sometimes with a few teeth near the tip. The flowers are arranged in small groups up to 100 mm (3.9 in) long, with leaf-like bracts, each flower on a pedicel 8–60 mm (0.31–2.36 in) long. The sepals are linear to elliptic, 2–2.5 mm (0.079–0.098 in) long, the petals yellow with a brownish base, 7–8 mm (0.28–0.31 in) long. The lower lobes of the corolla are about 2 mm (0.079 in) long with wings about 2 mm (0.079 in) wide. Flowering mainly occurs from October to December and the fruit is a more or less spherical capsule 3–4 mm (0.12–0.16 in) in diameter.

== Taxonomy and naming ==
This goodenia was first formally described in 1912 by Kurt Krause who gave it the name Goodenia nana, but that name was illegitimate because it had already been used (by Willem Hendrik de Vriese for a plant now known as a synonym of Goodenia humilis R.Br.). In 1980, Roger Charles Carolin changed the name to Goodenia krauseana in the journal Telopea. The specific epithet (krauseana) honours Krause who revised the family Goodeniaceae in Das Pflanzenreich.

== Distribution and habitat ==
This goodenia grows on rocky hills in the Eastern Goldfields and Great Victoria Desert regions of Western Australia.

== Conservation status ==
Goodenia krauseana is classified as "not threatened" by the Government of Western Australia Department of Parks and Wildlife.
