= Penders (holiday retreat) =

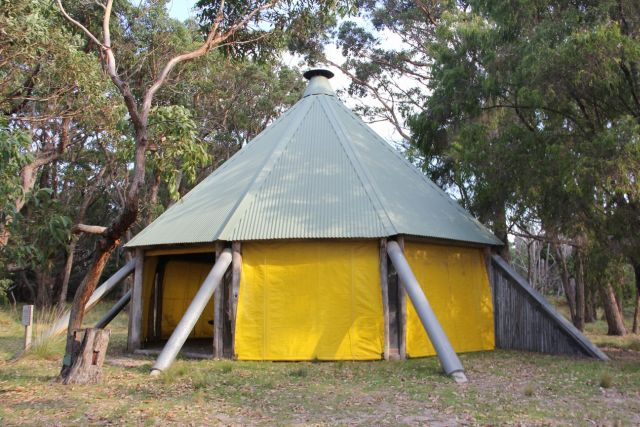
- 'The Barn', minimalist accommodation

- Location within New South Wales Location within Australia
- 36.6298°S 150.0162°E
- Location: Haighs Road (within Mimosa Rocks National Park), Tanja, Bega Valley Shire, New South Wales, Australia

History
- Built: 1964–1980

Site notes
- Architect: Roy Grounds
- Owner: Office of Environment and Heritage

New South Wales Heritage Register
- Official name: Penders; Grounds and Myer Holiday Retreat - Mimosa Rocks National Park; the "Barn"; Myers House
- Type: state heritage (complex / group)
- Designated: 29 November 2013
- Reference no.: 1913
- Type: Boarding/ Guest House
- Category: Transient Accommodation
- Builders: Hamish Ramsay and other local builders

Penders is a heritage-listed holiday retreat at Haighs Road (within Mimosa Rocks National Park), Tanja, Bega Valley Shire, New South Wales, Australia. It was designed by Roy Grounds and built from 1964 to 1980 by Hamish Ramsay and other local builders. It is also known as Grounds and Myer Holiday Retreat, 'The Barn' and Myers House. The property is owned by Office of Environment and Heritage (State Government). It was added to the New South Wales State Heritage Register on 29 November 2013.

== History ==
=== The pre-contact natural environment ===
Ordovician deposits comprise the sedimentary nature of the land at Penders. These deposits contain veins of quartz, which is a material often used by Aboriginal people to manufacture stone tools.

Penders is situated adjacent to Bithry Inlet, leading to Wapengo Lake. These coastal lagoons are important as they increase the variety of food resources along the coast. In addition, there are increased food resources available in the places along the coast that have rock platforms present along the shoreline, as is present along the coastline at Penders. These rock platforms are important habitats for a variety of marine resources, mainly shellfish as well as providing a stable point to undertake linefishing in the deeper water.

=== Indigenous history ===
Southeastern Australia is known to have been occupied by Aboriginal people for at least 40,000 years. Over that extensive period the Aboriginal people who camped or passed through the study area would have had some general impact on the natural environment. The most significant change that impacted on coastal landscapes was typically the application of firestick farming, which is the alteration of the vegetation cover using fire.

There is evidence of Aboriginal occupation throughout Mimosa Rocks National Park, with coastal shell middens and open camp site deposits present in the park and surrounding region. The coastal land comprising Penders would have been rich in resources for the local Aboriginal people. The availability of seafood resources as well as fresh water and a variety of terrestrial resources in the coastal hinterland would have made the area an attractive place to camp.

It is known that there were distinct tribal groups present along the coast, who tended to stay within their coastal zones as opposed to settling inland, where there were tribal groups although they were smaller in population. The inland and coastal people did interact and travel to each other's tribal areas however there was an ongoing exchange of people visiting other areas and was not reflective of any migrational trend or seasonal settlement.

Penders lies within the boundaries of the lands of the Dyiringanj Aboriginal people. The Dyiringanj were part of a group of tribes called the Yuin, whose territory stretched from Cape Howe to the Shoalhaven River. Each tribe or language group was further subdivided into several clans, the Dyiringanj being one of these clans. Members of each clan had "an historical, religious and genealogical identity" and clan territories would have been "defined by ritual and economic responsibilities".

=== Early colonial history ===
The first records show that it was not until the 1890s that the land around the study area was surveyed into portions and sold. Early maps show Henry Ritchie as the owner of much of the land including the site. Ritchie is the first recorded owner of portions 106, 107, 142, 143 and 135 in 1899. In 1959 ownership of the land eventually passed from Ritchie's family to the Innes family, who were well known for their sawmills in the region. Mrs Daphne Innes held the land for two years before selling it to Roy Grounds in 1964. An apparent proviso on the sale from Mrs Innes to Grounds was that the land at Penders should not be developed. Roy Grounds and Ken Myer became tenants in common in equal shares in 1966.

=== The Grounds and Myer occupation ===
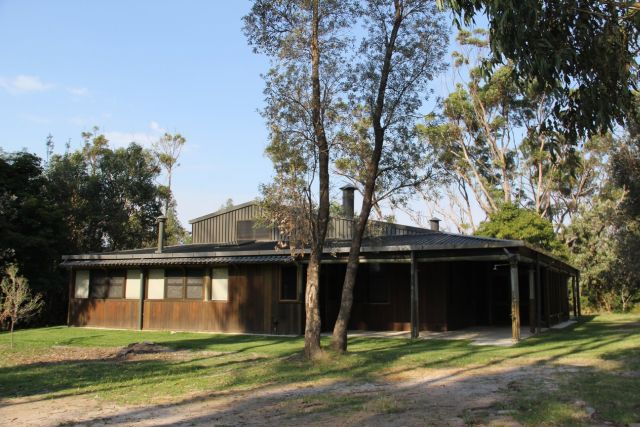
Facade of Myer House, designed by Roy Grounds

When Grounds purchased the property in 1965, it had extraordinary scenic and natural qualities including a 1.6 kilometre frontage to the Pacific Ocean, and a northern boundary along the serene stretch of tidal estuary called Bithry Inlet. The firm friends, Roy Grounds and Kenneth Myer subsequently became business partners with an agreement being made in 1965 regarding the partnership of Penders. This agreement predates Myer coming in as a tenant in common of the property in 1966.

At the time Grounds was well known in Victoria as the designer of the National Gallery of Victoria (1961–68) which was then under construction. Myer was a leading figure in the Victorian department store chain Myer, one of his most recent projects having been the initiator behind the vast Chadstone Shopping Centre (1961) in Melbourne's suburban south-east. After Roy Grounds purchased Penders in 1964, John and Mary Cremerius, who lived nearby were employed by Grounds to help "clean up" the site. Mary Cremerius recalls that at this time Penders was covered in rubbish as it seemed to have also been used as a bit of a local dump site for refuse. Broken bottles, tins, crockery and car body parts were removed from the site during the clean up at that time.

During the 1960s and 1970s, Grounds and Myer constructed a variety of buildings and structures to facilitate their enjoyment of the place, in addition to establishing several native timber plantations and a timber treatment works. Grounds in particular was looking for an escape, "a bolt-hole", a deliberate getaway from the pressures of commitments of the gallery and arts centre commission in Melbourne. Penders, in 1965, was extremely remote and thus an ideal place of seclusion for Grounds and his wife. Secondly, the site they eventually found required some restoration. A common project would be regeneration of the existing forest of Eucalyptus maculata (spotted gum) and the planting out of Eucalyptus saligna (Sydney blue gum), Syncarpia glomulifera (turpentine) and Eucalyptus grandis (flooded gum). They were ably assisted in this by noted botanist Professor Lindsay Pryor of the Australian National University in Canberra. The aim was ecological, an early and pioneering example on such a large and private scale. Thirdly, this project had the possibility of commercial potential. Grounds was interested in timber construction and he and Myer employed the Tanalith preservation process to cure timber cut from the site and resell as log poles, posts, and stakes. As the noted contemporary architectural historian Jennifer Taylor has observed, the result was a property that was "both beautiful and productive".

Before building any structures a wire fence was erected to mark the boundary of the property. The fence was intended to keep stray cattle from wandering onto the property. The fence had a generally unpopular impact on the local community who it is understood, initially felt wary and slightly aggrieved at its appearance. Part of the reasoning for this was that the fence prevented local people from accessing some of the land at Penders, which had been used as a common picnic ground for many years. News of Grounds and Myers purchase and fencing of the land soon spread throughout the local community and it appears that many people were curious as to what these "wealthy fellows from Melbourne" would do with the land at Penders.

The first structure built on the site was a simple timber slab bench seat overlooking the ocean. During the early stages of development of the property, Grounds and Myer and their wives Bettine Grounds and Pru Myer usually camped on the property. After numerous visits, Grounds decided it would be more useful to have some permanent tent that would not require packing and unpacking. At the same time, Grounds wanted to retain the feeling of being in the natural setting and being able to roll up the sides of the tent and allow such a permanent shelter to respond directly to the sun, wind and rain

Over the years Grounds and Myer constructed a number of structures and landscape features at Penders. These structures were for the most part experimental in terms of architectural form and within the context of the property and the environmental outlook of the owners. Built structures include the minimalistic shelter, called the "Barn", the geodesic dome which framed a vegetable and herb garden, a wind generator tower, a covered orchard, the Myer house, a timber mill and various seats and benches around the bushland.

=== The "Barn" ===
Much of the Barn's character, its design influences and choice of materials and structure derives directly from Grounds's intent that Penders be a total escape from Melbourne and its professional ties. It was to be a literal "bolt-hole", a place where Grounds could indulge in his own tinkering, entertain friends and family in peace, and be entirely removed from the pressures of the National Gallery of Victoria and the Victorian Arts Centre commission. The property was bought with that aim in mind. Early in 1965, Grounds submitted drawings for a barn to the then Mumbulla Shire Council in Bega. The barn was a very large and substantial nine-sided teepee structure made from logs of spotted gum cut from the site and treated using the Tanalith process. As a permit application, it was essentially a ruse. When the local building inspector arrived on site after construction had been completed, he found Grounds and his wife living in it as if it were a holiday house. Furious, the building inspector was greeted with Grounds's response that there was no legal objection to someone occasionally sleeping in a barn. There was nothing the inspector could do. The "Barn", as it soon became known, was to be the Grounds's holiday house at Penders for the next sixteen years and in that time, several alterations and additions were made to it.

The Penders property of 220 hectares was donated to the NSW Government to be incorporated as part of Mimosa National Park in 1976 by the owners, Sir Roy Grounds and Mr Kenneth Myer. Part of the agreement in regard to the donation of the property was that Grounds and Myer would be granted continued private use rights by way of lease. The lease encompasses an area of 20 hectares of land that contained their holiday retreats. The lease expired in 2001, and had been extended to January 2011.

Since this date, the area known as Penders has been managed by the National Parks and Wildlife Service (NPWS), part of the Office of Environment and Heritage (OEH) within the Department of Premier and Cabinet (DPC).

=== Aesthetic interpretations ===
The Barn at Penders, the geodesic dome and the Myer House can be seen, not as unusual in New South Wales, but as extreme, within the context of the history of outstanding timber wharf and bridge structures and the subsequent use of poles in holiday houses and motels. The buildings at Penders were extreme in their experiment with the return to rustic materials, finishes and construction techniques.

The remoteness of the project and its site, and the fact that Grounds did not publish this work, which would have worked against the Barn's use as an idyllic escape, meant that the architectural community in New South Wales and Victoria learnt about this building through vicarious means. It became an object of influence in the immediate region due to the timber plantation and its mill and another Victorian architect Graeme Gunn completed the pole-framed Yencken House in 1969. But amongst those who visited it from afar, the Barn achieved almost mythical status. The effect of the building must have been compelling, so much so that by 1986, Jennifer Taylor was to list the Barn as, in her opinion, one of the top twenty buildings in Australia. This was high praise indeed from someone who in the same breath was able to say that she had for many years reserved judgement on the work of Grounds generally. However, the Barn post dates Ian McKay and Philip Cox's CB Alexander Presbyterian Agricultural College at Tocal (1963) which was also determinedly rural in its references to the simplicity of farm outbuildings and frank timber carpentry techniques.

It would seem that the Barn had foreshadowed a number of themes in architecture in New South Wales. In Philip Cox's writings on the timber buildings in Australia from 1969 and the emerging reverence for the so-called functional tradition of primitive honest construction that would be celebrated in Cox's own work and in the seminal houses of Glenn Murcutt, like the Marie Short House, Kempsey, from the late 1970s onward. Those themes would gain national and even international recognition by the mid-1980s.

Rory Hyde, writing for the German online magazine Uncube in 2014 commented on the relationship between the Penders structures and Grounds' contemporaneous commission for Melbourne's National Art Gallery of Victoria:

'A cube, a dome, and a pyramid are arranged in a line. Made of timber, sheet metal and canvas, their crisp geometry stands out against the scrubby coastal bushland they occupy. Domestic in scale, these structures appear at once to be a part of the landscape, and yet alien to it. Cosmic geometries imposed on an ancient terrain... these three structures are evidence of unselfconscious creativity. Private sketches, simple yet profound. This was serious play, with serious aspirations. In these three structures we can see Grounds reaching toward an Australian vernacular, this architecture looks to the first shacks of the European settlers, unfussy and improvised.
'The most exciting of the structures is the geodesic dome. Unlike the crisp precision of Buckminster Fuller's domes in America, Grounds' dome is made of salvaged timber struts, with tin rubbish bin lids serving as the junctions. The dome becomes heavy, muscular, and odd. Through the process of importation, Fuller's rigorous mathematical form takes on the 'she'll be right mate' attitude of the Australian outback, as if built by a bush mechanic from a set of incomplete plans, obscured by red dust.
'Max Delany, curator of contemporary art at the National Gallery of Victoria, pointed out to me the similarity between these three informal timber shelters and the enormous urban complex of Melbourne's Arts Precinct. A cube, a dome, and a pyramid are arranged in a line. Just like the cube of the NGV, the dome of the Concert Hall, and the spire of the Arts Centre. Up on the New South Wales coast, Grounds built these three ad-hoc structures as a prototype for the largest cultural precinct in Australia. Lining up these structures in his mind, he was operating at the scale of a tent, but thinking at the scale of a city.'

=== Roy Grounds & Kenneth Myer ===
Roy Grounds (1905–81) was a St Kilda born Melbourne Architect. A decorated student he was a one time junior architect at Blackett and Foster, a world traveler and a WWII veteran, Grounds was known for his experimental "Australian Style" (fusing living and dining areas) and became one of the leading exponents of modernism in house design. In both private practice and as a lecturer at the University of Melbourne, Grounds grew up and contributed to a number of groundbreaking and often controversial mid 20th century architectural projects including distinctive house and flats (such as Moonbria); the Shine Dome at the Australian Academy of Science in Canberra; the National Gallery of Victoria and adjacent Arts Centre and the 18-storey tower at Hobart's Wrest Point Casino. Grounds received the Royal Australian Institute of Architects Gold Medal in 1968, and was knighted for his services to architecture 1969.

Kenneth Myer (1921-1992) of the famous Melbourne Myer family was chairman of the Melbourne Arts Centre building committee in the 1960s. It would appear that it was through his association with the Centre that the American born philanthropist and Myer Stores director became a close friend and patron of Roy Grounds. Myer, like Grounds, was WWII veteran - a decorated Lieutenant in the RAN. He was also something of a futurist, championing the construction of freeways and building of the malls that took over from shopping trips in the 1970s. Myer was involved in all matter of business and philanthropic pursuits and was at times variously President of the Town and Country Planning Association of Victoria (1953-1958).

== Description ==
=== The site and the cultural context ===
The Penders Precinct is located within the Mimosa Rocks National Park on the Far South Coast of NSW, approximately 420 kilometres south of Sydney, 15 kilometres north east of Bega, 12 kilometres north of the township of Tathra and 22 kilometres south of Bermagui. It is within the local government area of Bega Valley and the boundaries of the Bega Local Aboriginal Land Council area.

Mimosa Rocks National Park covers some 5,804 hectares and extends northwards along the coast from the mouth of the Bega River for 20 kilometres to the southern shore of Bunga Lagoon. Mean high water mark delineates the seaward and lakeside boundaries of the park. In addition to this coastal strip of land, the park also protects areas of hinterland forest, including most of the catchment of Nelson Creek.

The National Park is divided into northern and southern sections, separated by Wapengo Lake and a private property with ocean frontage situated on the northern shore of the lake. The inland extension of the park varies considerably, from a mere 100 metres at Picnic Beach to over 9 kilometres in the south at Doctor George Mountain. A cluster of partially cleared rural blocks at Doctor George Mountain forms an inholding within the park. A second inholding is situated immediately east of the Tathra-Bermagui Road near the village of Mogareeka. This small area is vested in the Bega Valley Shire Council and contains water supply infrastructure for Mogareeka. The rural properties situated at the head of Nelson Lagoon are virtually, though not entirely, enclosed by the park.

State forests border the park along two sections of the southern boundary (Tanja State Forest) and to the north-west (Mumbulla State Forest). Elsewhere, the park adjoins a mixture of forested and cleared freehold land that is primarily used for livestock grazing and a variety of residential and commercial developments on small rural allotments. Oyster leases exist within Nelson Lagoon and Wapengo Lake, both of which border the park.

The initial park reservation of 1973 was promptly followed by two generous donations of private land. In 1973, Sir Roy Grounds and Mr Ken Myer offered their property named Penders to the government on the basis that it be reserved as National Park. The property includes a 2 kilometre frontage to the Pacific Ocean and bushland stretching from Middle Beach to Bithry Inlet. In the same year, Mr David Yencken offered his Baronda property, covering 30 hectares at Nelson Lagoon, for the same purpose. These two additions were critical in establishing or consolidating core areas of the national park that would subsequently be added to and joined to create a viable conservation reserve. The history of private individuals donating land to the park has continued. The 37 hectare Texas property at Tanja, which was added to the park in 1996, was bequeathed by the late Ken Myer, while other neighbours (including Roy Grounds's son Marr), have donated land that was added to the park in 2001 and 2002.

Items on the Penders site include:

- The "Barn"
- Myer House
- Geodesic Dome
- Slab Seat
- The "Bum" Seat
- Shed/Bathroom Pod
- The Houseboat - now removed
- Main Dam
- Former Timber Plant
- Thong Camp
- Former Dairy Remains
- Wind Tower Remains and sculptural relics
- Myer Tennis Court
- Generator Shed
- Golf Course
- Covered Orchard
- Small fenced garden
- Memorial Monument

=== The "Barn" ===
As originally built, the "Barn" is a nine-sided structure with ten sloping poles forming the major framing elements, with no central support. The framing was set out on a circle with a 24-foot (7.3-metre) radius for the sloping poles and a 16-foot (4.9-metre) radius defined the covered zone of the teepee where doubled posts (eighteen in total) formed the major vertical elements and assisted in supporting the roof lining and cladding. Originally a sod roof (soon discarded for its impracticality), this was replaced by sheets of yellow semi-translucent corrugated fibreglass. Around seven sides of the "Barn", yellow blinds were hung vertically from the roof's lower edge.

Inside the "Barn", the main feature of the open planned space was a giant, almost centrally placed steel fireplace and combustion stove mounted back to back, offset from the centre on the southern side. On the northern side of the stove, the open fireplace had natural stones forming a hearth and beyond was the combined living and dining space. A large rectangular dining table had log legs that were set permanently into the floor. The space is still furnished with the original deck chairs and Betty Grounds's bamboo hanging chair, which dates from the 1970s. To the west and in the same space was a double bed with a mosquito net suspended above. Behind the stove was an improvised galley kitchen with a gas fueled refrigerator, stainless steel sink and the combustion stove for cooking. Shelves, towel rails and benches made by Grounds complete the joinery and there is also a cabinet with impressive dovetail jointing that Grounds had made in the 1930s for his first house "Ranelagh", at Mt Eliza in Victoria. The hot water service was mounted above the stove and behind the flue, the entire set-up being designed by Grounds. The floor was lined with cylindrical wooden blocks that originally extended out, approximately one metre around the building. With time, the inside end grain blocks became smooth and shiny, their random pattern contributing to the overall rusticity of the grand, almost baronial, space. The outside blocks are completely rotted and gone. To the south and west, two bays of the externally exposed sloping frame were enclosed and roofed with yellow corrugated fibreglass. One bay became a sunken bathroom complete with a square hip bath, river pebbles and a tiny timber window hatch to ventilate the space. The original door to the bathroom was counterbalanced by a weighted tin can. Water was by run by pipe from the nearest of a number of dams and tanks installed by Grounds on the site. A septic tank was also installed. The external walls of the bathroom pod were lined vertically with Tanalith treated saplings. The roof to the bathroom was originally translucent yellow fibreglass, giving a diffused yellow light. The second bay was used for storage, in particular for the batteries storing the energy produced by the wind tower.

=== The Myer House ===
The Myer House was constructed in the 1970s and has been in use as a holiday residence. It is a homestead-like house externally but internally the symmetrical plan and baronial scale of the main living space give the house an unexpected simple elegance and grandeur. This is amplified internally by the sheer surface of the stained Victorian ash veneer wall panels which are the same as those used by Grounds to line the walls of the National Gallery of Victoria, Melbourne (1959–69).

The Myer House has been planned on a three-foot (910 mm) module but with the major divisions of space being multiples of three feet plus six inches (that being the diameter of the pole construction of the house structure). The form of the house is an unequal gabled rectangular prism surrounded by a verandah of nine feet six inches (2,900 mm) on three sides and twelve feet six inches (3,810 mm) to the north facing Bithry Inlet. The construction of the house is from six-inch (150 mm) Tanalith treated logs for wall and roof framing with timber framed infill panels clad in rough sawn Tanalith treated vertical boards. The roof cladding of the house is dark brown Colorbond ribbed steel deck (not original) with stainless steel guttering. The floor of the verandah was originally laid with four-inch (100 mm) long sapling wood blocks. Most of the verandah floors have since been concreted over, but sample areas of the wood blocks have been retained at the south-west corner. The undersides of the eaves were originally lined in Tanalith treated saplings, but where the verandahs are now fully enclosed the ceilings have been lined with timber veneer panels. The window frames are all bronze anodised aluminium, again the same colour used at the National Gallery in Melbourne.

Inside, the main spaces of the house have been floored in cork tiles. The house has been symmetrically planned, though entry to the house is from a fly-screened verandah porch and not on axis. Once one has entered, however, the spacious entry hall is axial with a square skylight at its centre. A pair of tall sliding doors open onto a large baronial living hall. The robust log roof structure and its lining of Tanalith saplings in the same manner as the Barn is dramatic in effect. The Myer family has advised that foil strips were later added as a temporary fix to the roof lining. The foil strips were removed later by NPWS and new ceiling lining was installed to stop debris from falling. Complementing this space are two symmetrically placed fireplaces (that have been gas fired since installed), clerestorey lighting, and a massive dining table of three spotted gum slabs set permanently into the floor by six vertical Tanalith treated logs. The table seats ten people comfortably. A series of symmetrically placed sliding glass doors open onto two fly screened verandahs. Two symmetrically placed double bedrooms, each with an ensuite bathroom, complete the formality of the plan. In each ensuite, there is a square skylight like the one in the hall, the result an echo, as Marr Grounds has suggested, of the three skylit courtyards of the National Gallery of Victoria, with the Myer House living room mimicking the Gallery's Great Hall.

The verandahs have been partly enclosed over the years to accommodate changes to the house. These later alterations include the relocation of the kitchen (which was originally concealed behind the large cupboard doors in the Entry Hall) to the western side of the house with a meals area / family room adjacent, the creation of a Japanese bathroom (which has recently been converted to a bedroom) and a further bedroom on the north-east corner.

=== The geodesic dome ===
Adjacent to and aligned on a magnetic north axis south of the "Barn" is the extraordinary construction of the timber geodesic dome. The dome, constructed from 75mm diameter Tanalith treated saplings, sits above a base drum structure, one metre high, of vertical round timbers. The dome itself is supported off fourteen log columns. The floor of the dome is a concrete slab. In the centre of the interior space is a hexagonal shaped raised garden bed. The soil in this bed was originally heated by battery operated underground wires installed by Grounds to increase the ambient heat within the dome and this heating contributed to the successful growing of paw-paw at Penders. Involved in the construction and resolution of the geodesic dome was Hamish Ramsay, Betty Grounds's son from her first marriage. Ramsay, an engineer who had formed a partnership with Norman Mussen in Canberra, had already worked on some of Grounds's buildings in Canberra. While the dome was Grounds's pet idea, Ramsay was able to provide structural advice and collaborated with Grounds in its construction. A geodesic dome is the construction of an almost spherical surface achieved through the repetitive use of a single geometric shaped frame, in this case, the triangle. Each three points of the triangle frame meets another five triangles thus the connection point or hub becomes a crucial location of detail design. The important goal is 1) how to make the connection; and 2) how to weatherproof each connection.

At Penders, Grounds used a circular wood block as the connecting hub. Bolts screwed into the hub and each sapling were tensioned as required to enable connection to be made to all six members. To further strengthen these connections, stainless steel straps were wrapped around the wood hub and back to the framing members. It is not clear whether these straps were original fixtures or a later precautionary device added to give further stability to the structure. On the outside edge of the hub, Sisalation paper then a double layer of yellow sailcloth became the waterproof sleeve to the hub. The danger, of course, was that the timber hub might rot. The failure of one joint alone would be enough to make the structure extremely unstable. To complete each hub, Grounds added, in typically idiosyncratic style, a galvanised steel "Tomlin" rubbish tin lid (500mm in diameter) which was bolted on to each sapling. The same bolt holes used to attach the rubbish tin lids were also the connecting points for the stainless steel straps. The entire arrangement was a tour-de-force of resourcefulness and making do - in absolute opposition to the hyper-technological solutions being developed overseas to waterproof, seal and connect the much larger geodesic domes designed by the form's inventor R Buckminster Fuller.

Grounds also glazed some of the triangular panels with clear perspex sheet. These sheets were cut to fit around the rubbish bin lids and along the length of each framing member were held in place by folded galvanised steel sections that screwed onto the sapling framing member. Grounds never completely glazed the dome. Instead, about eighty percent of the dome was covered in yellow sail cloth. These cloth infill panels have since perished or been removed. The top of the dome is crowned by a clear acrylic domelight which was held off the structure to act as a ventilator for the controlled environment within.

The dome had two functions. The first use was as a greenhouse, intended for the growing of herbs, and vegetables. The second use was that the dome be a workshop for Roy Grounds, a place where he could tinker with experimental gadgets for Penders, work on maintenance jobs for the site, and also where he could indulge his interest in timber and rock sculptures. There was tool storage, a bench for opening oysters and to wash them and a laundry copper inserted into the bench.

=== Condition ===
As at 22 February 2013, Penders: After the cessation of cattle grazing, the occupied north eastern coastal tip of the site and to a lesser extent the associated tracks and roadways were managed by a regime of year-round slashing and path and track maintenance and mowing. Tree planting took place in regimented, regularly spaced rows, principally in the form of avenues along tracks.

More recently, since the death of Kenneth Myer in 1992, the grounds have been managed by a reduced slashing schedule and the understorey of stands of marked trees has been allowed to regenerate and dams are showing signs of silting up under the pressure of extensive reed growth. The area used as a camping ground by guests to the south east has been considerably reduced in size as the bush margins have been allowed to regenerate.

==== The "Barn"(1965) ====
Most of the main raking support poles for the "Barn" suffered significant amount of rotting below ground level over the years, which would have led to the structure's possible collapse. The structure underwent extensive repairs in 2001-02. The structural poles were scraved where necessary with ironbark bush poles and new plates and stainless steel bolts. The condition of the structure has therefore improved since 2002 with the completion of the structural stabilisation work. The Grounds family used the site intensively. The "Barn" is exposed to insect infestation, general wear and tear from the lightweight walls exposing the interior to the elements, and to general wear and tear from different groups who now use the building.

==== The geodesic dome ====
In 2002, the dome was assessed as being in poor structural condition, with the ends of some of the poles splitting, some of the poles and hubs rotting, and bolts were rusting. Some of the vertical infill poles were missing, others had dropped away from the horizontal pole to which they were nailed and there appeared to be nothing to support the base of these poles. The vertical poles supporting the dome appeared sound at their bases. Apart from one crack the concrete slab was sound.

There have been no obvious changes to the way the Geodesic Dome was constructed since preparation of the 2002 Conservation Management Plan, other than loss of all of the Perspex infill panels (indicating movement of the dome structure). The condition of the structure appears to have deteriorated markedly since 2002, especially the support base for the dome, comprising vertical sapling balustrades with a sapling top plate which have largely separated from each other. Attempts have been made to prop the sapling balustrades and brace between the posts as the balustrade structure is now being forced open by the weight of the dome structure itself and attempts have been made in some sections to provide a bottom plate for the sapling balustrades. The splitting of some of the poles and the rusting of the bolts and hubs as noted in 2002 is continuing. The deterioration of the planter boxes is also continuing.

==== The Myer House and tennis court (c. 1970) ====
The Myer House has been maintained in immaculate condition internally. Most of the fittings and fixtures are original or have been replaced with very similar fittings (e.g. light fittings and bathroom fixtures). While no original architectural drawings have been located, the Myer Family have advised that the northern half of the verandahs around the house were originally enclosed with flyscreens to create "sleep out" areas for the children. Later alterations and additions over the years have been mainly located in these perimeter edges of the house in the form of rooms and glazing.

Most of the timber block verandah floor was concreted over after it began to deteriorate and made wheelchair access by a family member difficult. Metal sleeves have been attached to many of the verandah columns and beams to prevent bush-rat entry. The only original furniture to remain in the house are fixed pieces, such as the dining table and desk in the Main Hall. In addition, five solid timber arm chairs made by workers from the Penders Depot after Ken Myer's death, and each engraved with the name of one of Ken's children and "PENDERS TIMBER 93", have remained with the house. The cork floor tiles throughout the house were deteriorating but were replaced in 2012 with new cork tiles which matched the size and colour of the original tiles. The tennis court is in good condition.

==== The Thong Camp ====
The Thong Camp is simply a cleared area of land for camping, located south of the "Barn" and Geodesic Dome close to the beach on the eastern edge of the site. It has been maintained as an open area for camping in good condition.

==== The slab seat (1964-65) ====
To the north east of the "Barn" the slab seat and associated logs remain in good condition, with no obvious alterations other than removal of the sculpture previously adjacent to the seat. These elements are in an erosion zone and may be moved to a safer place nearby when necessary.

==== The windmill tower remains (c. 1964) ====
The remnants and alterations made to the windmill tower to turn it into a sculptural relic that were made in 1996 remain, and the structure has not deteriorated markedly since 2002.

==== Small fenced garden ====
Remnants of the small fenced garden remain including many posts, however the netting survives only on one section. Overall the garden is in poor condition.

==== The bum seat ====
The bum seat remains and is in average condition, and is a more delicate structure than the other log seats.

==== Former timber treatment plant shed ====
The former timber treatment plant shed remains without any major changes to the structure since 2002. The shed is suffering from some wear and tear including a section of damaged weatherboards near the base of the north east corner, and is in fair condition.

==== Shed/bathroom pod (c. 1969) ====
The Shed/bathroom pod remains sound and in good - fair condition. (Some of the poles were intentionally placed at an angle and this gives the impression that the building is failing). The WC remains but the water supply has been disconnected from the building since 2002.

==== The main dam ====
The main dam remains functional as the water supply for the Myer House and as the water supply for the "Barn". It continues to be engulfed by extensive weed growth, and although the fountain still exists it is not operational and has been displaced by weed growth.

==== The covered orchard ====
The covered orchard remains in poor condition, with the netting and post structure starting to fail. There are random plantings remaining but these seem to be in poor condition.

==== Golf course (1983-85) ====
Since 2002 the natural landscape has continued to encroach into the remnants of the fairways of the former golf course, however no active regeneration has taken place. The golf course therefore remains in poor condition.

==== Avenues of native trees ====
There are two avenues of flooded gums planted in the Myer/Grounds era - one up the hill to the south of the Myer House towards the water tower and one south of the Myer House on the track between the Myer and Grounds properties. These are in good condition, and are considered appropriate plantings for the site.

==== Ken Myer and Yasuko Hiraoka Memorial ====
This exists on the hill to the south of the site, and is technically outside of the Penders site. It comprises a seat and plaque beside the walking track.

==== New structure placed by M. Grounds (2010) ====
A memorial exists just near where the Roy Grounds tripod structure stood east of the "Barn", and comprises a plaque in memory of Sir Roy and Lady Bettine Grounds.

It is considered that the removal of the Houseboat, the Cubby, the Workshop and the Solar Shed have no impact on the significance of the site, confirmed by the fact that they were provided with a level of low significance in the 2002 Conservation Management Plan. Although the remains of the Wind Tower were considered to have high significance in the 2002 CMP, it was noted that they have low integrity, and this remains the case.

The sculptures at the Myer House (the Japanese stone lantern and cats, and the sculptures by Peter Taylor, David Tolley and Michael Meszaros) were all assessed as having a high level of significance, with the sculpture by Michael Meszaros having had a direct relationship to the site. However, these items were personal artefacts and the Grounds sculptures have been re-erected at Marr Ground's property nearby. It is noted that log, concrete and steel sculptures have been retained on the site.

The removal of the sculptures from the site is considered a major loss to the significance of the Penders site, particularly the Sir Roy Grounds and Marr Grounds sculptures which had a direct relationship to the creators of the place, and these were assessed as having high significance some significance in the 2002 CMP.

=== Modifications and dates ===
==== The "Barn" ====
The original sod roof was removed in the early 1970s and replaced with yellow fibreglass, which was replaced with green Colorbond, corrugated steel roofing in 1993. The bathroom and storage room were also reroofed with alternating panels of the green Colorbond and translucent corrugated plastic. The structural poles, which were trimmed by Marr Grounds to compensate for uneven sinkage are now being replaced or scarfed. Most recently, Marr has expanded and improved the central fireplace with added wood storage and remounted the hot water service and installed an adjustable lamp and the hanging pantry and its pulley system of his own design.

The primary changes to The "Barn" since 2002 are its loss of original use as accommodation at the end of 2010, and removal of some furniture including the original deck chairs, the c. 1970s bamboo hanging chair, and the mosquito net. The dovetail jointed cupboard has been removed, and the double bed has been removed since October 2010. Timber repair including scarfing of the inclined poles at their bases, which was underway in 2001-02, has been completed. Other repairs since 2002 include scarfing in a new bottom section to each inclined pole, enlarging the bolts and replacing them as stainless steel, removal of the heavy wire strapping around the building at lintel level and replacement with stainless steel cable, adjustments to the attachment point on each lintel beam, especially where there had been some rotation of that beam and it was not sitting square, all new timbers were painted with Koppers CN Emulsion product, the floor retaining perimeter logs which were also mostly rotted out were replaced, along with some of the flooring blocks where these were no longer serviceable, all the perspex infill panels between the vertical poles were also replaced, and all the yellow blinds were removed during the stabilisation works, and were re-hung following.

==== The Myer House ====
The various functional rooms of the house have over time been relocated to its edges. In c.1972 an additional toilet was added to the southern verandah. The kitchen was located in the entry area, until Yasuko Myer organised to have it shifted to its current position around 1988, which was about the same time the Japanese bathroom was added (Joanna Baevski pers. comm. to Stephen Deck). In c.1993 a third bedroom was created within the north-eastern corner of the verandah. In c.1996 a large window was installed between the Main Hall and the northern verandah and in 2001 the western ensuite was modified for wheelchair use.

At the same time as the kitchen was relocated, plain beige quarry tiles were laid in the front entrance and at the kitchen entrance, to accommodate the Japanese custom of removing shoes when entering the house. (Joanna Baevski pers. comm. to Jane McKenzie)

Other changes since 2002 have been the partial covering of the timber blacks forming the floor of the verandah with a cement slab. Two remnant semicircular patches of the blockwork were intentionally retained to indicate the original finish - one in the south western side near the entry directly to the kitchen, and one on the south eastern side against the east wall.

In 2012, the National Parks and Wildlife Service undertook conservation works and refurbishment to the house to allow it to be rented out as a holiday house. Infrastructure works included the installation of a solar array for energy, installation of rainwater tanks for potable and fire fighting water supply and a new sewage treatment system. Conservation works included the replacement of the roof cladding and gutters, repairs and stabilisation of the verandah posts, and replacement of the skylights and flues. The kitchen and bathrooms were refurbished - retaining the spirit of the original design in the choice of materials and colours and the retention of some original fixtures. The Japanese bathroom was converted to a fourth bedroom and the sapling and mesh verandah enclosures were repaired and strengthened.

=== Removals following handover of site ===
In early 2011 the two families who developed the structures within the site vacated and handed the site over to OEH. Since 2002, the following structures have been removed from the site:

- Houseboat (was situated between the Myer House and The "Barn");
- Cubby and Solar Shed (was situated adjacent to The "Barn");
- Workshop (was adjacent to the Geodesic Dome);
- Wind tower relic (which has been further dismantled since the 2002 report);
- Sculptures including the Tripod Sculpture by Sir Roy Grounds, two Tripod and Rock sculptures by Marr Grounds, the Marr grounds sculpture in front of the slab seat, the Peter Taylor's wooden Cape Barren Goose sculpture, the David Tolley sculpture, the Michael Meszaros sculpture, the Japanese stone lantern and the two Japanese stone cats.

== Heritage listing ==
Penders is of state significance as it comprises a rare suite of modernist buildings and structures designed by the renowned architect Roy Grounds within a setting of great natural beauty. Penders was used by Grounds as an experimental workshop for the exploration of creative structures, and experiments that influenced the evolution of modernist architecture across Australia in the later half of the twentieth century.

The "Barn" represents one of the most revealing buildings of Grounds's career, and clearly displays the architectural philosophies that under-pinned his architecture - his belief in the logic of geometry as the basis for rational design, and his wish for a harmonious union between the built and the natural environments of the site. The geodesic dome and the Myer House are supporting structures that demonstrate Grounds's scope and interests. The structures collectively demonstrate an extreme in New South Wales in their level of experimentation with the return to rustic materials and finishes, the use of Tanalithic treatment process and log pole construction techniques.

The structures located at Penders are held in high esteem by the architectural community. These structures are recognised as an integral part of a design process that ultimately produced a body of work of national significance including the National Gallery of Victoria, the Australian Academy of Science and the Arts Centre Melbourne that exhibit innovative and ground breaking technology. Grounds's buildings have subsequently influenced later generations of architects who have continued the functional tradition of primitive honest construction celebrated in his work at Penders.

The Penders site also has a strong association with Kenneth Myer, member of the prominent Myer retail family. The site demonstrates his ecological aims and interest in the commercial use of native timbers through its partially extant timber plantation and remains of the experimental shed for the Tanalithic timber preservation process.

The place demonstrates the shared interests of Grounds and Myers in architecture and sculpture, in native forestry, and in the preservation and rehabilitation of the natural environment. The donation of the site to the state of NSW to expand the Mimosa Rocks National Park, is an expression of their philanthropy and their belief in public ownership of coastal lands across Australia.

Penders was listed on the New South Wales State Heritage Register on 29 November 2013 having satisfied the following criteria.

The place is important in demonstrating the course, or pattern, of cultural or natural history in New South Wales.

The Penders site has local historical significance to the Indigenous community as an area that was inhabited due to availability of abundant resources, and to the non-Indigenous community as part of an area used for logging, and the grazing of dairy cattle, from the mid 1840s to the mid 20th century. The Penders site is also significant for its continuous use for recreation by the local population.

The Grounds built "Barn", (the c.1965 teepee shaped timber pole house), and the Myer house (c. 1970) built for Ken and Pru Myer were early products of the rise of the south coast holiday house phenomenon within the 1960s and 1970s in the region. The move to natural and unadorned materials and honestly expressed structure was a general aesthetic shift that was paralleled internationally by the rise of so-called New Brutalism. The Grounds Barn and Myer holiday house are a product of that critical reassessment of the polished and machine inspired architecture of the 1950s.

The "Barn" and the Myer House have historic significance as foreshadowing the development of the "Sydney School" architectural style which gained national and international recognition by the mid 1980s.

The former Timber Treatment Plant shed has historical significance as being associated with timber milling and with the development of a Tanolithic treatment process for materials used in the Ground's structures.

The place has a strong or special association with a person, or group of persons, of importance of cultural or natural history of New South Wales's history.

The Pender's site has strong association with, and contains rare and key experimental works of Sir Roy Grounds (1905–81), one of Australia's most influential architects pioneering modernist design. His output was considerable and includes major works including the National Gallery of Victoria, the Australian Academy of Science and the Arts Centre Melbourne that are recognised as being of State heritage significance in Victoria. The "Barn", is one of the most revealing buildings of Grounds's career and clearly displays the architectural philosophies that under-pinned his architecture - his belief in the logic of geometry as the basis for rational design and his wish for a harmonious union between the built and the natural environments at the site. Grounds' significant contributions in the field of architecture were acknowledged and recognised nationally when he was awarded the Royal Australian Institute of Architects Gold Medal in 1968 and knighted in 1969.

The Penders site also has a strong association with Kenneth Myer (1921–92), member of the prominent Myer retail family, and demonstrates his ecological aims and interest in the commercial use of native timbers through its timber plantation and remains of the experimental shed for the Tanalithic timber preservation process. Most recently, the Penders site has had associations with Marr Roy Grounds, son of Roy Grounds, an influential artist who has worked to promote arts in Australia. Examples of his work are held in collections at the Australian National Gallery and Parliament House in Canberra and the State Galleries in Sydney.

The donation by Grounds and Myer of Penders to the State to expand the Mimosa Rocks National Park is a significant philanthropic contribution by enlightened individuals to the ongoing preservation of the natural environment. It also represents an expression of Grounds's and Myer's belief in public ownership of coastal lands across Australia.

The place is important in demonstrating aesthetic characteristics and/or a high degree of creative or technical achievement in New South Wales.

The primary structures on the site (The "Barn", Myer House and Geodesic Dome) and their setting in the landscape have resulted in a place that is likely to have aesthetic significance at a State level. The structures demonstrate the creative experimentation of the nationally significant architect Sir Roy Grounds's post war interest in geometric forms, innovative structure, and natural materials, resulting in buildings that were highly unusual at the time. The structures demonstrate an extreme in New South Wales in their level of experimentation at the time with the return to rustic materials, finishes, and the use of Tanalithic treatment process and log pole construction techniques.

Designed during the latter phase of Sir Roy Grounds' career (1960-1981), the "Barn" features a permanent, environmentally responsive timber structure situated near the ocean and estuary. Adjacent to the Barn is a rustic geodesic dome influenced by the structural concepts of R. Buckminster Fuller. Nearby, the Myer House incorporates a scaled-down floor plan based on Grounds' design for the National Gallery of Victoria. The holiday house reflects traditional Australian homestead design, transitioning from a modest exterior to a structured interior, and remains custom timber chairs designed by the architect.

The special and unusual aesthetic qualities of the "Barn" and the Geodesic Dome have been recognised and highlighted in published papers by notable architectural historians Jennifer Taylor and Philip Goad.

The place has a strong or special association with a particular community or cultural group in New South Wales for social, cultural or spiritual reasons.

The structures located on the Penders site are held in high esteem by the architectural community. These structures are recognised as an integral part of a design process by Sir Roy Grounds that ultimately produced a body of works of national significance including the National Gallery of Victoria, the Australian Academy of Science and the Art Centre Melbourne that exhibit innovative and ground breaking technology. The "Barn" attracted great interest among the art and architecture circles in Australia, and despite a deliberate absence of media promotion it has achieved an almost mythical status. This is evidenced through numerous publications including The Encyclopedia of Australian Architecture.

Grounds's buildings have subsequently influenced later generations of architects including Australia's most famous architect, Glenn Murcutt, who has continued the functional tradition of primitive honest construction celebrated in Grounds's work at Penders.

Penders also has contemporary social significance as a founding example of property purchased along the south coast or in the nearby bush where a series of like-minded intellectuals and artists from the major cities followed Grounds and Myer in building and occupying modest and environmentally sensitive structures as holiday retreats.

The place has potential to yield information that will contribute to an understanding of the cultural or natural history of New South Wales.

The "Barn", Geodesic Dome, storage sheds, windmill tower, Myer House and an array of structures at Penders are likely to have research potential at a state level as demonstrating advances in timber pole construction techniques, and demonstrating the early use of the Tanalithic timber preservation treatment which was pioneered on the site and became a significant industry in the region.

The place possesses uncommon, rare or endangered aspects of the cultural or natural history of New South Wales.

Penders is the site of a rare suite of buildings, and structures designed by the nationally renowned architect Sir Roy Grounds, who has few known designs in NSW. The juxtaposition of the three structures is a rare demonstration of Grounds's creative scope within one site. The "Barn" and the geodesic dome built in 1965 were two of the first fully coherent log structures to be built post-war that were not intended for agricultural purposes or as a bridge structure, but instead for domestic use. The "Barn" and the Myers House were the first of a series of environmentally responsive holiday retreats that would be built by others in the region.

Penders is also rare as an early and pioneering example of a site that demonstrates ecological aims in the remediation of a remote coastal landscape. The partially extant plantations on site represent some of the earliest examples of private Eucalypt plantation management in the state.

The place is important in demonstrating the principal characteristics of a class of cultural or natural places/environments in New South Wales.

Penders is representative of coastal holiday retreats on the south coast. The "Barn" and the Myer House have significance as representative examples of new building types for holiday accommodation, following the introduction of the motel in the 1950s postwar tourism boom.

The "Barn" in particular represents an idealised way of living in the Australian climate and landscape in the 1960s. The adjustable blinds, the original lighting on the Barn's Perimeter, and the construction materials taken from the site, demonstrate an early and serious attempt at an ecologically responsible architecture. The "Barn" is an iconic representative example of the work of the fourth phase of Roy Ground's career, between 1960 and 1981, that was dominated by the commission for the National Gallery of Victoria and the Victorian Arts Centre. Both building complexes are listed as of state significance in Victoria.
