= Tanja, New South Wales =

Tanja
- Suburb
- Coordinates: 36°38′00″S 149°58′00″E
- Country: Australia
- State: New South Wales
- LGA: Bega Valley Shire
- Location: 14 km (8.7 mi) NE of Bega

Government
  - State electorate: Bega
  - Federal division: Eden-Monaro

Population
  - Total: 157 (2016 census)
- Postcode: 2550

Tanja is a locality in the Bega Valley Shire of New South Wales, Australia. At the 2016 census, Tanja had a population of 157.

Tanja Public School is situated on Barrabooka Road. The school had an enrolment of 17 in 2017. It dates from 1878, having originally begun in a room of the school teacher's own residence.

Tanja Post Office opened on 1 September 1878 and closed on 28 August 1980.

== Heritage listings ==
Tanja has a number of heritage-listed sites, including:

- Haighs Road (within Mimosa Rocks National Park): Penders
- Nelson Lake Road, Nelson Lagoon, Mimosa Rocks National Park: Baronda
