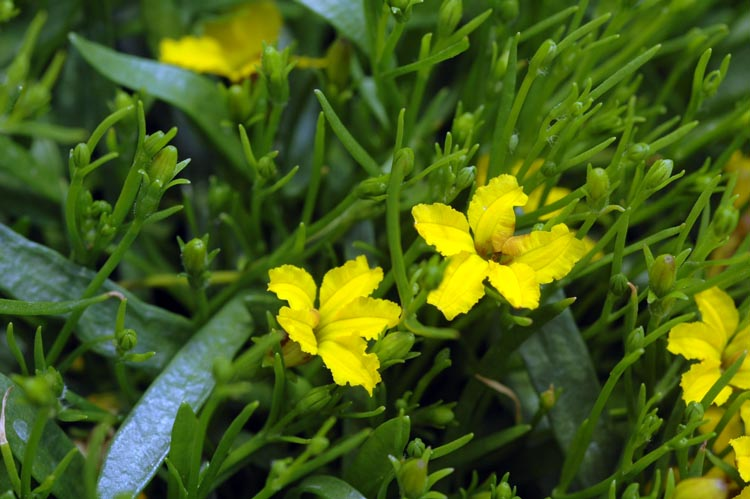
- Goodenia humilis in the ANBG

Scientific classification
- Kingdom: Plantae
- Clade: Tracheophytes
- Clade: Angiosperms
- Clade: Eudicots
- Clade: Asterids
- Order: Asterales
- Family: Goodeniaceae
- Genus: Goodenia
- Species: G. humilis

Binomial name
- Goodenia humilis R.Br.

Synonyms
- Goodenia graminifolia Hook.f.; Goodenia humilis var. alpigena F.Muell.; Goodenia humilis R.Br. var. humilis; Goodenia nana de Vriese

= Goodenia humilis =

Swamp goodenia

Species of plant

Goodenia humilis, commonly known as swamp goodenia, is a species of flowering plant in the family Goodeniaceae and is endemic to south-eastern Australia. It is a weak, perennial herb with linear to lance-shaped leaves mostly at the base of the plant, and racemes or thyrses of yellow or yellowish-brown flowers.

== Description ==
Goodenia humilis is a weak, perennial herb that typically grows to a height of 20 cm (7.9 in) with linear to lance-shaped stem-leaves with the narrower end towards the base, mostly arranged at the base of the plant, 40–100 mm (1.6–3.9 in) long and 4–8 mm (0.16–0.31 in) wide, sometimes with toothed edges. The flowers are arranged in racemes or thyrses slightly longer than the leaves, with linear bracts 5–14 mm (0.20–0.55 in) long and bracteoles 3–4 mm (0.12–0.16 in) long. Each flower is on a pedicel 5–12 mm (0.20–0.47 in) long with linear to lance-shaped sepals 1.5–3 mm (0.059–0.118 in) long. The petals are yellow or yellowish-brown, 8–12 mm (0.31–0.47 in) long. The lower lobes of the corolla are 4–5 mm (0.16–0.20 in) long with wings about 1 mm (0.039 in) wide. Flowering mainly occurs from November to March and the fruit is an oval capsule 3–3.5 mm (0.12–0.14 in) long.

== Taxonomy and naming ==
Goodenia humilis was first formally described in 1810 by Robert Brown in his Prodromus Florae Novae Hollandiae et Insulae Van Diemen. The specific epithet (humilis) means "low or small".

== Distribution and habitat ==
This goodenia grows in swampy places and damp areas in woodland and grassland. It is widespread and locally common in Victoria but also occurs in Tasmania, the far south-east of South Australia and in New South Wales, south from Wapengo Lake.
