= Ness, Wapengo =

Ness Property
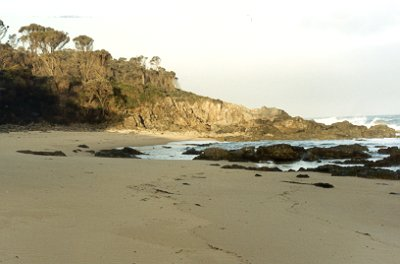
- Coastal scenery

- Location within New South Wales Location within Australia
- 36.6151°S 150.0243°E
- Location: Reserve Road, Wapengo, Bega Valley Shire, New South Wales, Australia

New South Wales Heritage Register
- Official name: Ness Property; Ness Landscape
- Type: state heritage (landscape)
- Designated: 2 April 1999
- Reference no.: 519
- Type: Other - Landscape - Cultural
- Category: Landscape - Cultural

Ness is a heritage-listed natural coastal reserve at Reserve Road, Wapengo, Bega Valley Shire, New South Wales, Australia. It was added to the New South Wales State Heritage Register on 2 April 1999.

== History ==
Archaeological evidence and oral accounts indicate that this area was used by local Aboriginal people.

Oral tradition has it that clearing of part of the property was carried out in the 1880s by Chinese from the alluvial gold fields. The contours of possible Chinese garden plots are faintly discernible on the property.

European occupation of the property has not resulted in any buildings of historical significance although two structures of recent date relate to occupation of the site by alternative lifestyle "hippies" and include an interesting stone house with a large circular window.

In 1985 the owners of Ness, Professor Manning Clark and his wife, Dymphna Clark, wishing to protect the area's heritage and scenic values nominated the property for a Permanent Conservation Order. On 29 September 1987 a Permanent Conservation order was placed over the property.

On 2 April 1999 Ness was transferred to the State Heritage Register.

== Description ==
The property Ness at Lake Wapengo, located between Bermagui and Tathra on the NSW South Coast, is an area of 160 hectares (396 acres) with major frontage to the South Pacific Ocean, Bithry Inlet, Lake Wapengo and the northern section of Mimosa Rocks National Park. The area has spectacular coastal exposures of folded Wagonga Beds of Palaeozoic rocks. Rocky headlands, secluded coves, beaches and the tranquil waters of Lake Wapengo, with its mangroves and highly regarded oyster beds, give the area special quality.

The coastal strip retains its natural vegetation cover but some part of the property has been cleared for grazing.

Aboriginal sites have been recorded on the property.

European occupation of the property has not resulted in any buildings of historical significance although two structures of recent date relate to occupation of the site by alternative lifestyle "hippies" and include an interesting stone house with a large circular window.

== Heritage listing ==
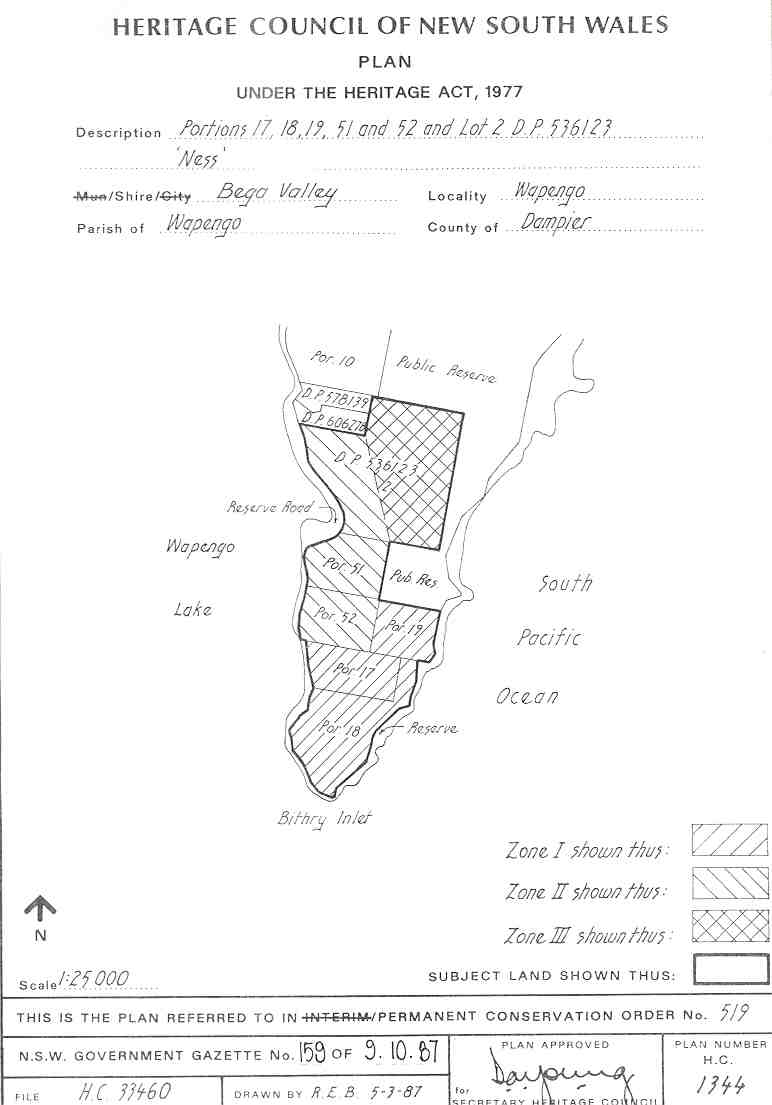
Heritage boundaries

Ness is considered to have aesthetic, natural and Aboriginal significance as an item of the State's environmental heritage. Ness is associated with Manning Clark, a principal Australian historian. Its nomination by Manning Clark represents his foresight and concern for preserving the values of the State's environmental heritage for his family and for all Australians.

Ness was listed on the New South Wales State Heritage Register on 2 April 1999 having satisfied the following criteria.

The place is important in demonstrating the course, or pattern, of cultural or natural history in New South Wales.

Ness is considered to have aesthetic, natural and Aboriginal significance as an item of the State's environmental heritage. Ness Property is associated with Manning Clark, a principal Australian historian. Its nomination by Manning Clark represents his foresight and concern for preserving the values of the State's environmental heritage for his family and for all Australians.
