= Wapengo, New South Wales =

Wapengo New South Wales
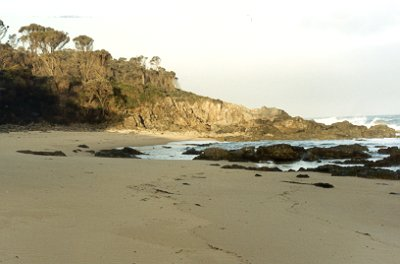
- Coastal scenery, Ness property

- Coordinates: 36°36′00″S 149°59′00″E
- Population: 69 (2016 census)
- Postcode(s): 2550
- Location: 17 km (11 mi) NE of Bega
- LGA(s): Bega Valley Shire
- State electorate(s): Bega
- Federal division(s): Eden-Monaro

Wapengo is a locality in the Bega Valley Shire of New South Wales, Australia. At the 2016 census, Wapengo had a population of 69.

It adjoins Wapengo Lake, which has been home to oyster farming operations since the 1890s.

Wapengo Public School operated from 1881 to 1925. It was half-time with Cuttagee from October 1893 to January 1895 and with Murrah from January 1905 to September 1907.

Wapengo Post Office opened on 1 July 1919 and closed on 23 July 1971.

Historian Manning Clark and his linguist wife Dymphna Clark lived on a property at Wapengo, "Ness" for many years. A portrait of Manning Clark at Wapengo is on display at the National Portrait Gallery in Canberra.

== Heritage listings ==
Wapengo has a number of heritage-listed sites, including:

- Reserve Road: Ness
