= Mimosa Rocks National Park =

National park in New South Wales, Australia

- IUCN category II (national park)
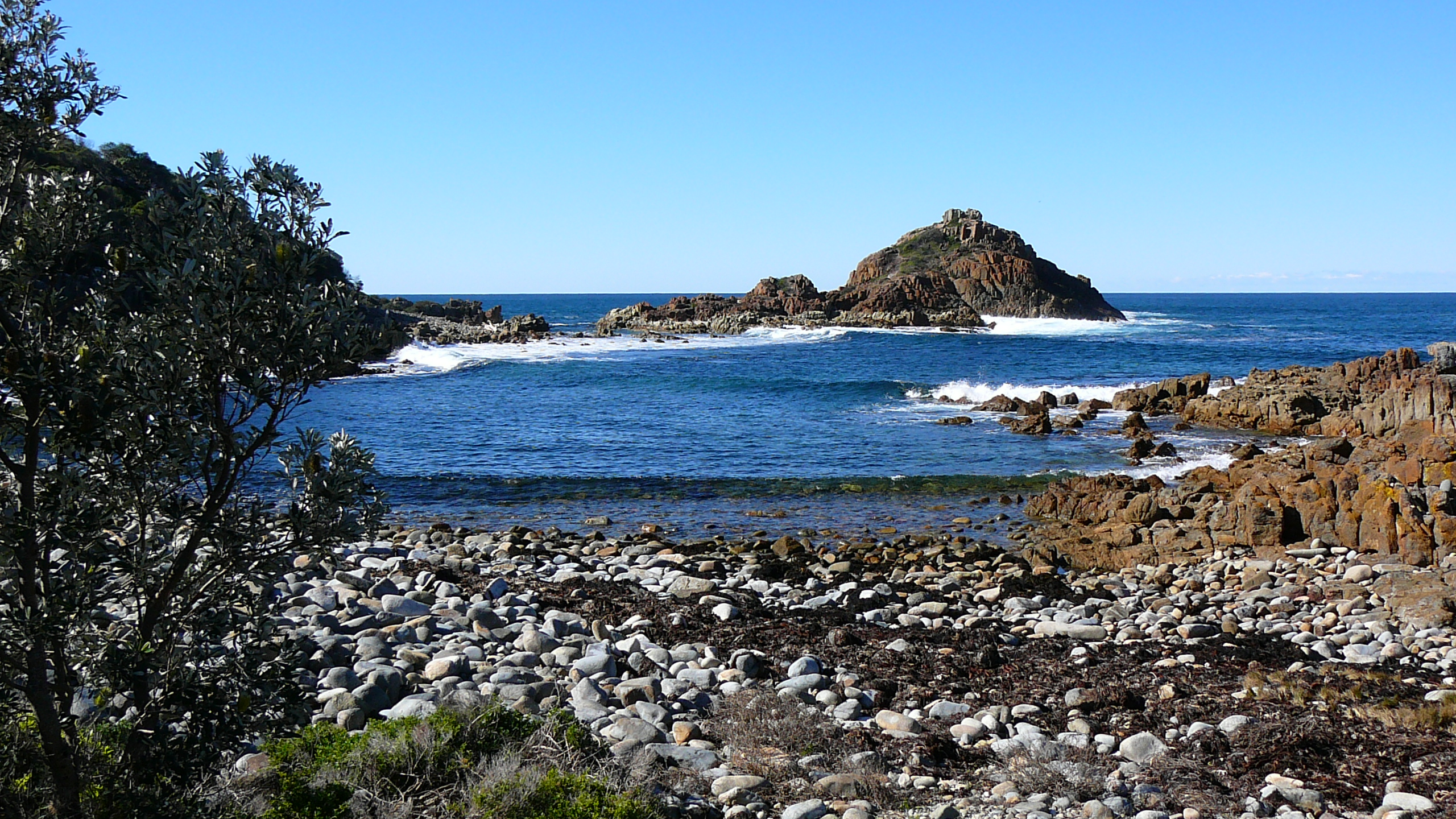
- Mimosa Rock, Aragunnu

- Location within New South Wales
- Location: New South Wales
- Coordinates: 36°40′0″S 149°56′10″E
- Area: 57 km^{2} (22 sq mi)
- Established: 13 April 1973
- Governing body: National Parks and Wildlife Service (New South Wales)
- Website: Official website

Mimosa Rocks is a national park in New South Wales, Australia, 329 km southwest of Sydney near the towns of Tathra and Bermagui. The park is close to Bournda National Park and forms part of the Ulladulla to Merimbula Important Bird Area, identified as such by BirdLife International because of its importance for swift parrots.

== Description ==
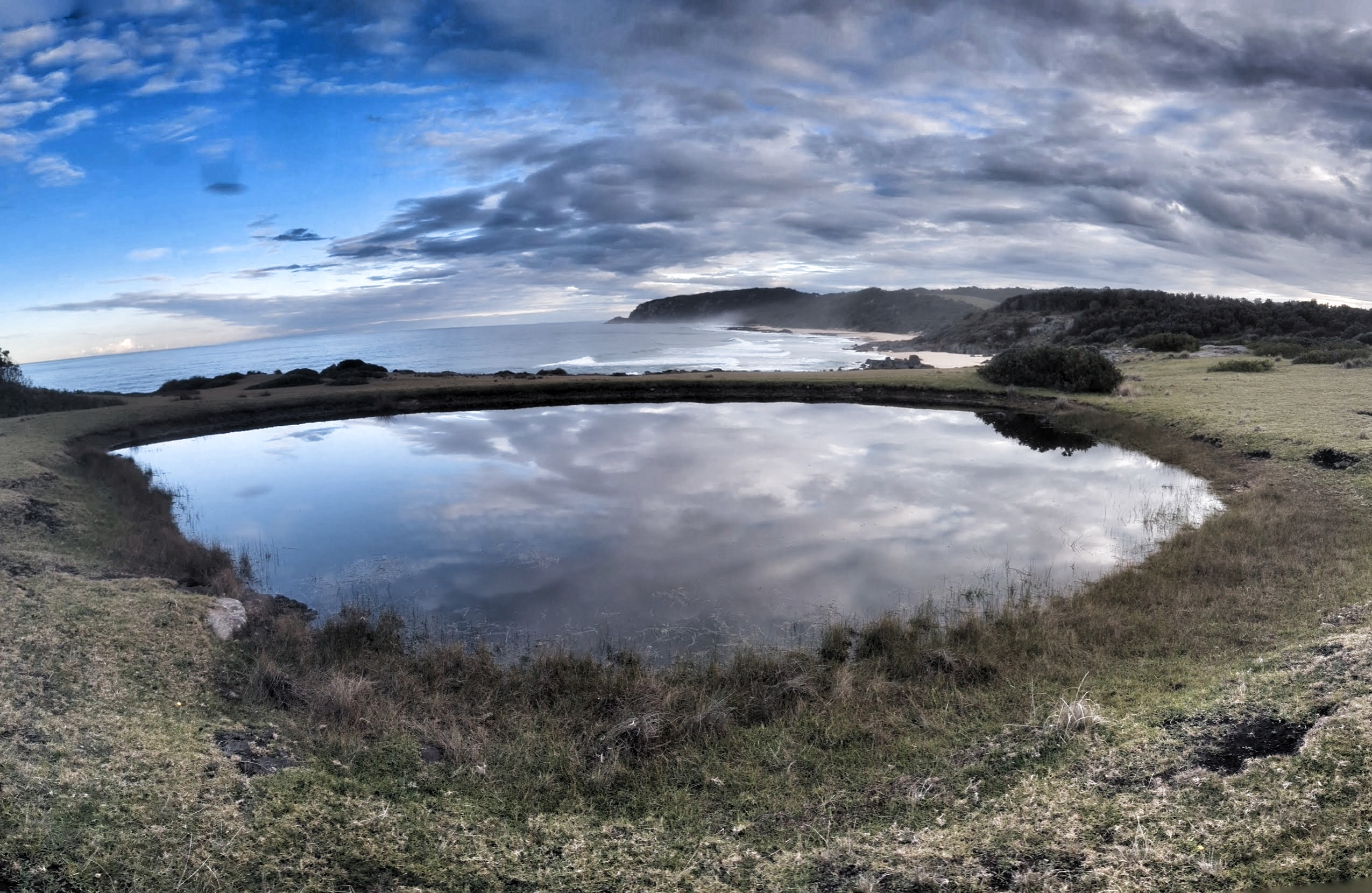
Looking south from Goalen Head

Mimosa Rocks National Park starts at the northern end of Tathra Beach and runs north for about 16km. The most recent addition to the park was the acquisition in 1999 of 260 acres subdivided from the Murrah Gardens Estate owned by the Hammond family, which includes the coastline of Bunga Beach and Goalen Head. It has five access roads from the Tathra-Bermagui main road. There are four main campsites in the Mimosa Rocks National Park; Gillards, Middle Beach, Aragannu, and Picnic Point. All campsites have barbecues and non-flush toilets available.

Traditionally this country belongs to the Yuin people. The recommended walk provides insight into the rich cultural heritage of Aboriginal people.

The average elevation of the terrain is 69 metres above sea level.

== See also ==
- Protected areas of New South Wales
