= Louise Phister =

Danish actress (1816–1914)

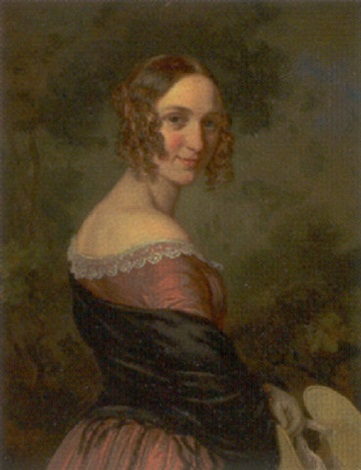
Louise Phister in the 1840s.

Louise Petrine Amalie Phister, née Petersen, (1816–1914) was a Danish stage actress.

== Life ==
Bust by Theobald Stein, 1886

Phister grew up in poverty; on her father's death, she applied to become a chorister at the Royal Danish Theatre. The theatre, discerning her talent for acting, instead enrolled her to study as an actress, and she became the maid and student of Anna Nielsen in 1829. Phister made her debut in 1835. She took many parts as a soubrette, appearing also in vaudeville, breeches parts and, eventually, in roles depicting old women. She was decorated with the medal in service for actors, Fortjenstmedaljen, in gold in 1885, and broke a record when she retired in 1895 after sixty seasons on the stage. Her last performance came in 1901, as a guest star.

She was married in 1846 to the actor Joachim Ludvig Phister.

== Roles ==
=== 1830s ===
- 1835: Barselstuen - Pige hos Corfitz
- 1835: De to grenaderer - Suson, Mathurins datter
- 1835: Maskerade - Leonora
- 1835: Værtshuset - Louison, kammerpige
- 1836: Den bogstavelige udtydning - Jenny
- 1836: Den politiske kandestøber - Pige
- 1836: Den skinsyge kone - Miss Russet
- 1837: Henrik og Pernille - Pernille
- 1837: Virtuosen nr. 2 - Juliane
- 1838: Den bogstavelige udtydning - Jenny
- 1838: Gert Westphaler - Pernille
- 1838: Hekseri - Pige
- 1838: Henrik den Fjerdes huslige liv - Dauphin, 15 år
- 1838: Jacob von Thyboe - Pernille
- 1838: Maskerade - Pernille
- 1838: Vejen til ødelæggelse - Jenny

=== 1840s ===
- 1840: Barselstuen - Øllegaard Sværdfegers
- 1840: Den politiske kandestøber - Anneke
- 1840: Julestuen - Pernille
- 1840: Kilderejsen - Pernille
- 1841: Det lykkelige skibbrud - Pernille, Jeronius' pige
- 1841: Scapins skalkestykker - Zerbinette
- 1842: De usynlige - Columbine
- 1842: Den gerrige - Frosine
- 1842: Doktoren mod sin vilje - Martine
- 1842: Jean de France - Marthe, Jeronimus' pige
- 1843: Den honette ambition - Pernille
- 1843: Den stundesløse - Pernille, stuepige
- 1844: Don Juan - Karen, bondepige
- 1844: Jægerne - Cordelia v. Zeck
- 1845: Diderich Menschenskræk - Kaptajnens hustru
- 1846: Barselstuen - Else Skolemesters
- 1846: De usynlige - Columbine
- 1846: Den adelige borger - Nicolette
- 1846: Den stundesløse - Pernille, stuepige
- 1846: Diderich Menschenskræk - Kaptajnens hustru
- 1846: Don Juan - Karen, bondepige
- 1846: Figaros giftermaal - Suzanne, grevindens kammerpige
- 1846: Hekseri - Pige
- 1846: Henrik og Pernille - Pernille
- 1846: Jean de France - Marthe, Jeronimus' pige
- 1846: Scapins skalkestykker - Zerbinette
- 1846: Sganarels rejse til det filosofiske land - Agathe
- 1847: Barselstuen - Øllegaard Sværdfegers
- 1847: Det lykkelige skibbrud - Pernille, Jeronius' pige
- 1847: Doktoren mod sin vilje - Martine
- 1847: Fruentimmerskolen - Kirsten
- 1847: Jægerne - Cordelia v. Zeck
- 1847: Kærlighed uden strømper - Mette, Grethes fortrolige
- 1848: Barselstuen - Else Skolemesters
- 1848: Den politiske kandestøber - Anneke
- 1848: Jacob von Tyhboe - Pernille
- 1849: Den indbildt syge - Antoinette
- 1849: Julestuen - Pernille
- 1849: Maskerade - Pernille
- 1849: Pernilles korte frøkenstand - Pernille
- 1849: Som man behager - Phebe

=== 1850s ===
- 1850: Crispin sin herres rival - Pernille
- 1850: Den vægelsindede - Pernille, Lucretias pige
- 1850: Erasmus Montanus - Nille
- 1850: Gulddaasen - Jomfru Trækom
- 1850: Maskerade - Pernille
- 1851: Den vægelsindede - Pernille, Lucretias pige
- 1851: Gert Westphaler - Pernille
- 1853: Lovbud og lovbrud - Jaquenette
- 1854: Det tvungne giftermaal - Dorimene, ung kokette
- 1856: De usynlige - Columbine
- 1858: Den listige advokat - Colotte, Patelins tjenestepige
- 1858: Medbejlerne - Terne
- 1859: Kilderejsen - Pernille

=== 1960s ===
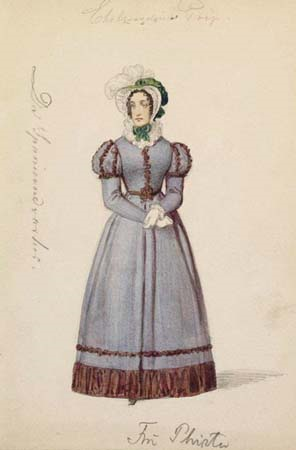
Louise Phister as etatsrådinde Prip in When the Spaniards Were Here

- 1860: Den vægelsindede - Pernille, Lucretias pige
- 1860: Jægerne - Madam Warberger
- 1861: De lystige passagerer - Madame Saint-Hilaire, skuespilerinde
- 1861: Den honette ambition - Pernille
- 1861: Viola - Maria
- 1862: Jeppe paa Bjerget - Nille, Jeppes hustru
- 1863: Scapins skalkestykker - Nerine, Hyacinthes amme
- 1866: Det arabiske pulver - Pernille
- 1866: Pernilles korte frøkenstand - Pernille
- 1869: Geniets komedie - Alvilda Brummer

=== 1870s ===
- 1870: Grøns Fødselsdag - Madam Bek, husholderske
- 1873: Henrik og Pernille - Pernille
- 1874: Det lykkelige skibbrud - Magdelone
- 1874: Fejltagelserne - Fru Hardcastle
- 1874: Pernilles korte frøkenstand - Magdelone
- 1876: Maskerade - Magdelone
- 1877: De usynlige - Harlelins usynlige
- 1877: Henrik IV - Madam Raskenfart

=== 1880s ===
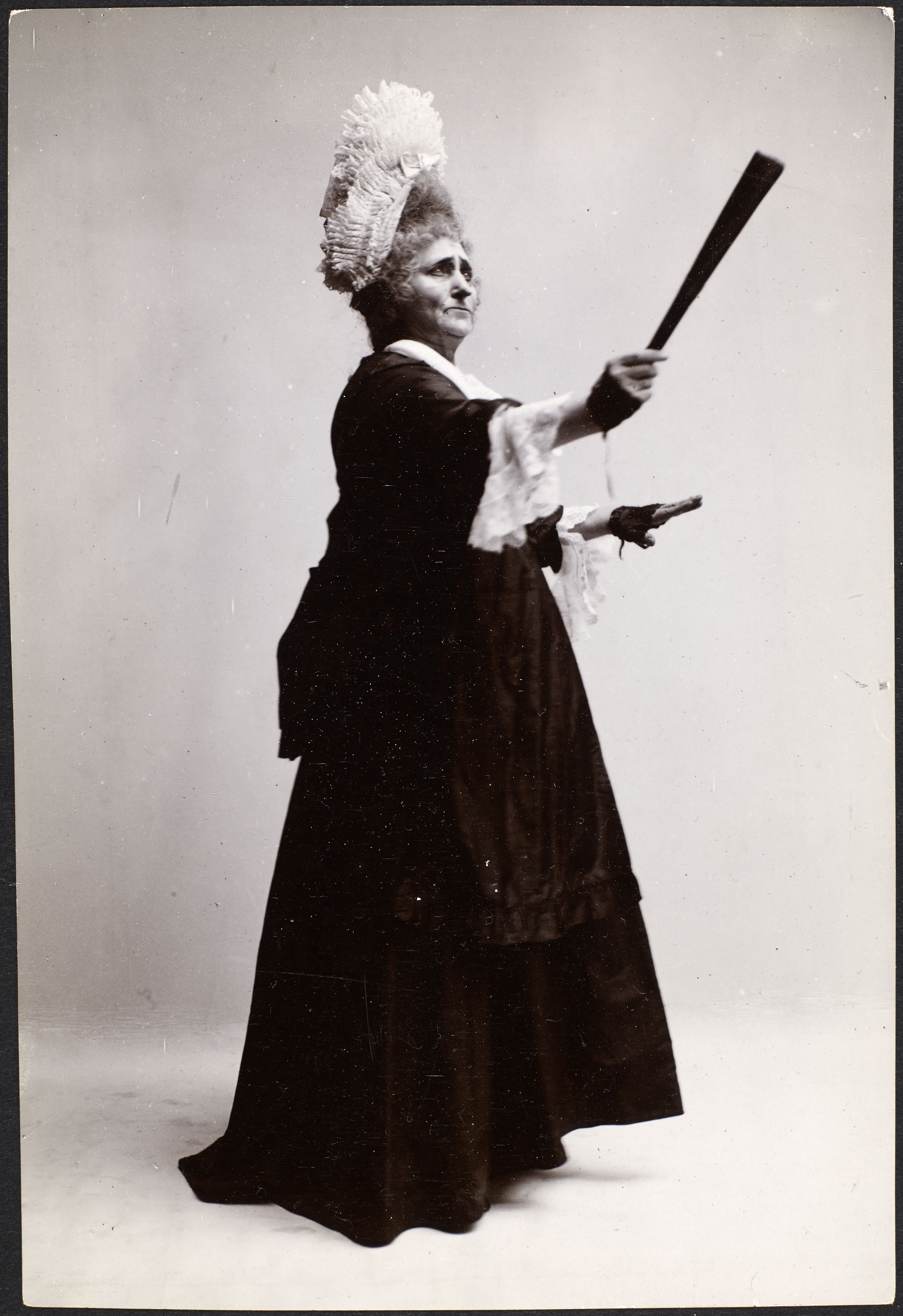
Louise Phister in 1885–90 in the part of Else Skolemesters in Barselstuen, Royal Danish Library.

- 1880: Barselstuen - Gedske Klokkers
- 1880: Den pantsatte bondedreng - Gertrud
- 1880: Henrik IV - Madam Raskenfart
- 1881: Jean de France - Magdelone, Frands' hustru
- 1882: Den forvandlede brudgom - Fru Terentia
- 1882: Henrik og Pernille - Magdelone, gammel kone
- 1884: Ulysses von Ithacia - Dronning Dido
- 1885: Henrik og Pernille - Magdelone, gammel kone

=== 1890s ===
- 1889: Jacob von Tyboe - Leonora
- 1891: Hedda Gabler - Juliane Tesman
