= Betty Hennings =

Danish actress (1850–1939)

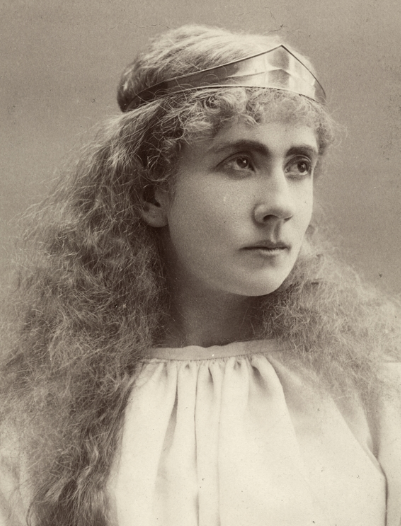
- Born: Betty Mathilde Schnell; 26 October 1850; Copenhagen, Denmark
- Died: 27 October 1939 (aged 89); Gentofte, Denmark
- Occupations: Ballet, actress
- Years active: 1861 — 1922
- Spouse: Henrik Hennings (m. 1877)
- Parent(s): Stig Jørgen Schnell, Regine Sophie Dorothea Schmidt

Betty Mathilde Hennings née Schnell (1850–1939) was a Danish actress who entered the Royal Danish Theatre as a ballet dancer but in 1870 turned to acting, first performing in Molière's The School for Wives. She later became known for her roles in the plays of Henrik Ibsen, especially as Nora Helmer in A Doll's House.

== Biography ==
Born on 26 October 1850 in Copenhagen, Betty Mathilde Schnell was the daughter of the tailor Stig Jørgen Schnell (1816–70) and Regine Sophie Dorothea Schmidt (1819–81). On 25 July 1877, she married the music publisher and composer Henrik Hennings.

She trained as a ballet dancer at the Royal Danish Theatre under August Bournonville who recognized her talents, giving her leading roles including Hilde in A Folk Tale and promoting her to solo dancer in 1869. But her potential was also noticed by the dramatist Frederik Høedt who encouraged her to become an actress. She decided to accept his offer, preferring a more relaxed career on the stage to that of a ballet dancer.

Her theatre début was in 1870 when she played Agnès in Molière's The School for Wives. As she matured, she began to perform in a number of Ibsen's plays, including Nora in A Doll's House, Hedvig in The Wild Duck, the title role in Hedda Gabler, and Ellida in The Lady from the Sea. She starred in other Scandinavian works, such as those by Bjørnstjerne Bjørnson, Holger Drachmann and Gunnar Heiberg but also performed in a variety of other dramas, including Shakespeare's Hamlet, playing Ophelia and later Gertrude, and as Schiller's Maria Stuart.

In later life, Hennings continued to act in Ibsen's plays, taking on increasingly mature roles. One of her later roles was Clara in Gustav Wied's Skærmydsler. On her retirement in 1908, she was acclaimed as the first lady of the Royal Theatre. All in all, she had played 170 parts in almost 3,000 performances.

Betty Hennings died on 27 October 1939 in Gentofte.

== List of roles ==
=== Royal Danish Theatre ===
- 1861 Julestuen as Anne
- 1861 Ludlams hule as Betty
- 1865 Julestuen as Marie
- 1867 Købmanden i Venedig asJessica, Shylocks datter
- 1870 Fruentimmerskolen as Agnete
- 1871 Fejltagelserne as Frøken Trine
- 1873 Pernilles korte frøkenstand as Leonora
- 1874 Det lykkelige skibbrud as Pige
- 1875 Henrik og Pernille as Leonore
- 1876 Maskerade as Leonora
- 1877 Jacob von Tyboe as Lucilia
- 1878 Fruentimmerskolen as Agnete
- 1878 Henrik og Pernille as Leonore
- 1879 Et dukkehjem as Nora, Helmers hustru
- 1879 Pernilles korte frøkenstand as Leonora
- 1880 Den vægelsindede as Leonora
- 1880 Stor staahej for ingenting as Hero
- 1882 Den forvandlede brudgom as Leonora
- 1884 Den politiske kandestøber as Raadsherreinde
- 1884 Den stundesløse as Leonore
- 1884 Hamlet as Ophelia
- 1884 Maskerade as Leonora
- 1884 Ulysses von Ithacia as Iris
- 1885 Den politiske kandestøber as Raadsherreinde
- 1885 Vildanden as Hedvig
- 1888 Barselstuen as Barselskone
- 1888 Den politiske kandestøber as Raadsherreinde
- 1889 Pernilles korte frøkenstand as Leonora
- 1891 Hedda Gabler as Hedda Tesman
- 1893 Bygmester Solness as Hilde Wangel
- 1893 Et vintereventyr as Hermione
- 1895 Lille Eyolf as Asta Allmers
- 1897 John Gabriel Borkman as Ella Rentheim
- 1900 Naar vi døde vaagner as Irene
- 1900 Richard III as Elisabeth
- 1901 Kong Lear
- 1901 Skærmydsler as Clara
- 1903 Et vintereventyr as Hermione
- 1905 Gengangere as Fru Helene Alving
- 1908 Tunge veje as Fra Wedekind
- 1910 Hamlet as Dronning Gertrud
- 1921 Moderen as Moderen
- 1922 Det gamle hjem as Urania, Rabes datter

=== Odense Theatre ===
- 1918 Det gamle hjem as Urania, Rabes datter
- 1918 Gengangere as Fru Helene Alving
- 1918 Hvor man keder sig as Hertuginden af Reville
