= 1717 in Norway =

- Centuries: 16th; 17th; 18th; 19th; 20th
- Decades: 1690s; 1700s; 1710s; 1720s; 1730s
- See also: 1717 in Denmark; List of years in Norway

Events in the year 1717 in Norway.

== Incumbents ==
- Monarch: Frederick IV

== Events ==
- Niels Wernersen was ennobled, and given the noble family name Werenskiold.
- Seminarium Lapponicum is established in Trondheim, a school for preparing teachers to teach in Sami language.
- 24 December - HDMS Lossen is wrecked during the Christmas storm of 1717, outside the island Vesterøy in Hvaler.

== Births ==
=== Full date unknown ===
- Jens Schanche, postmaster (died 1787).
