= Elsa Laula Renberg =

Sámi activist and politician (1877–1931)

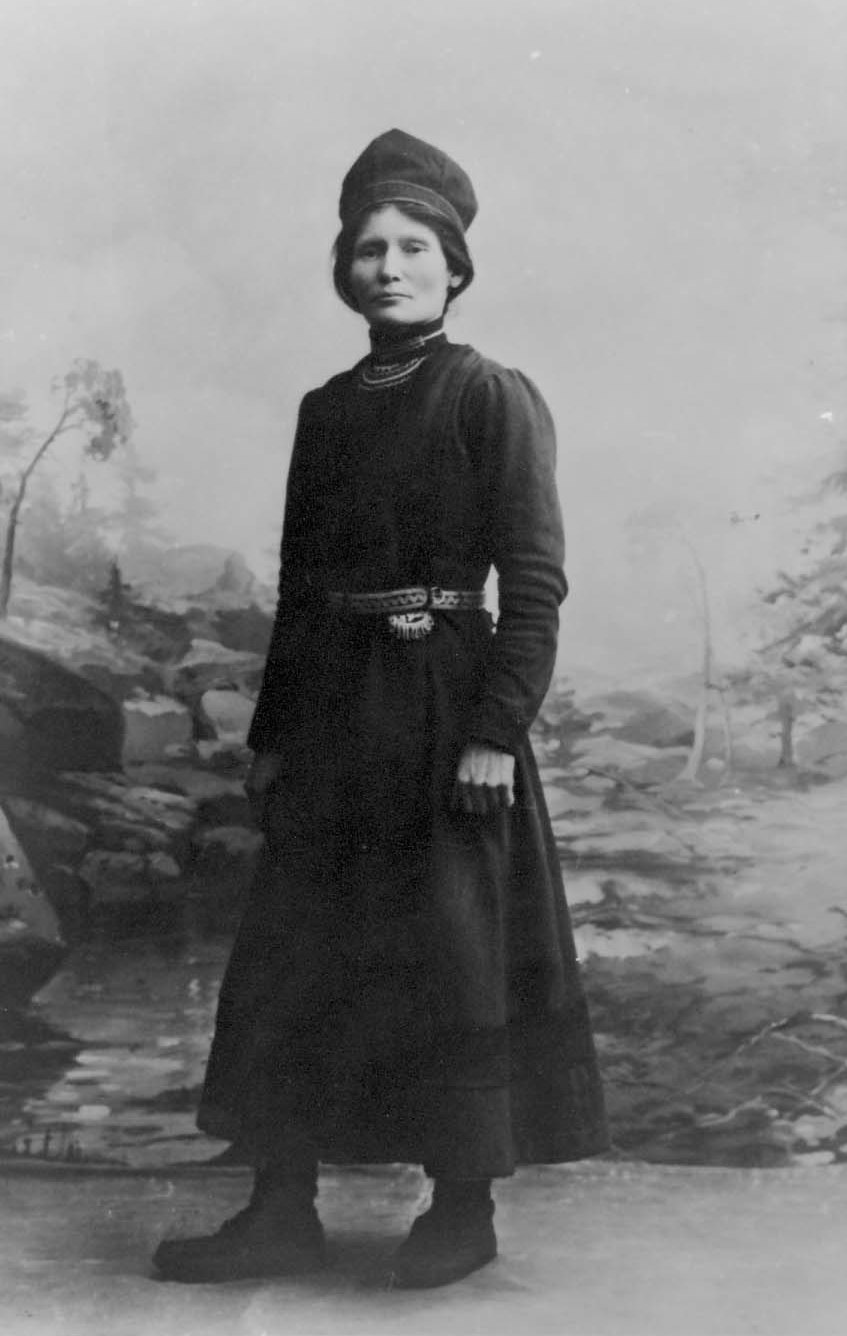
Elsa Laula Renberg, probably November 1915.

Elsa Laula Renberg (née Elsa Laula, 29 November 1877 in Storseleby outside Vilhelmina – 22 July 1931 in Brønnøy Municipality) was a Southern Sámi activist and politician. Alongside Torkel Tomasson and Johan Enok Nilsson she established and served as the leader of the first Sámi political organization "Lapparnas Centralförbund". She also initiated and served as chairwoman for the first international Sámi Assembly in 1917.

== Childhood and Background ==
Elsa Laula Renberg was born on the 29th of November 1877 to Lars Thomasson Laula (1846–1899) and Kristina Josefina Larsdotter (1847–1912). Her place of birth is debated as her family lived in a Siida on the border of Norway and Sweden, however regardless she was born in Sápmi territory.

Her family were traditional reindeer herders up until 1898 when, due to financial hardship, they decided to transition to agriculture starting a small farm on their land they named "Kanaan". The Swedish policy of "lappskatteland" or "Sámi tax land" taxed Sámi for the land they lived on but did not legally give them the right to own or work on the land. Due to this and other policies such as The Reindeer Gazing Act Elsa's family was prohibited from working the land as they did not own it in the eyes of the government. In July 1899 Elsa's father Lars and brother Matteus tragically drowned days before a court hearing regarding the use of their land. In February of the next year Elsa's mother Kristina was part of an envoy to the king opposing the policies that restricted their land use. As a result of their advocacy her family received a letter from the king affirming their right to work and live in Kanaan. The issue of land use and ownership would be an issue Elsa continued to champion throughout her life.

== Education ==
In 1903 Elsa Laula Renberg traveled to Stockholm and had an audience with Princess Sofia who promised to support Elsa's education in the capital as a midwife. She began her studies the following year and graduated in 1905, however she did not practice as a midwife and did so only on a few rare occasions. This time in the capital was foundational in her political and activist career as she met like minded individuals. One of her classes, held in January 1905, was "Samernas första folkbildningskurs", an introductory class specifically for Sámi focused on political and social organizing. The class was taught by politician and suffragist Anna Lindhagen sister of Carl Lindhagen the chief magistrate for Stockholm, both champions of women's rights and advocates for better treatment of Sámi people.

== Advocacy and Politics ==
=== Early activism in Sweden ===
During her time in the city in 1904 Elsa Laula Renberg became more politically active opposing the Swedish policy of “Lapp ska vara lapp” ("Lapps should be Lapps") which aimed to retain the Sámi reindeer-herder's nomadic lifestyle and restrict Sámi sovergeinty. On April 4, 1904 Elsa Laula Renberg held a lecture that was written about in the Fredrika-Bremer-Förbundet's Dagny paper. Two days later Elsa Laula Renberg had an audience with King Oscar II representing Sámi from Åsele, Vilhelmina, and Lycksele. She delivered a letter outlining issues such as perceptions of Sámi as beggars and alcoholics with the largest emphasis on the right to land use. The letter was written with advice from Carl Lindhagen. A short while later the same year she published her most influential work, "Infor lif eller död?", echoing and expanding on the points made in the letter to the king.

=== Publication and Organizing in Sweden ===
"Infor lif eller död? Sanningsord i de Lappska förhållandena" (Do we face life or death? Words of truth about the Lappish situation) was published in 1904, the first publication by a Sámi woman. The polemic text is 30 pages and consists of critiques surrounding land use laws, the encroachment of settlers on Sámi land, the mistreatment and characterization of Sámi, Norwegianization education systems, and general policies aimed at the assimilation and erasure of Sámi. Around the same time in August 1904 the first Sámi political organization, "Lapparnas Centralförbund" (Central Association for the Lapps), was established and led by Elsa. Two other prominent young Sámi political activists, Torkel Tomasson and Johan Enok Nilsson were also involved in leading the association. The association was short lived and met only once due to lack of funding, however it acted as a catalyst for the growing presence of a Sámi national identity and presence in politics, spawning local associations across Sweden.

=== Criticism ===
Elsa's vocal advocacy and public presence from 1904-1905 made her a clear target. She was attacked both personally and for her views by Swedish journalists. One of her most notable critics was Vilhälm Nordin who wrote multiple articles in the paper Umebladet attacking Elsa saying her "jeremiad is humbug" in reference to "Infor lif eller död?". Nordin writes "The Lapps are doomed to ruin and death. It cannot be helped. But it is the Swedish Authority's duty to make the death as painless as possible.", the responsibility of the colonial state is denied in this case and the settlement of Sámi land is framed as a natural and "inevitable" due to the nature of their lifestyle.

=== Organizing in Norway and Sámi Identity ===
In 1907 Elsa Laula Renberg began giving speeches and lectures in Norway focusing on the need for Sámi to collectively organize to establish a political presence. In 1908 she married her husband Tomas Pedersen Toven, adopted the last name Renberg, and moved to Brurskanken in Vefsn where they had six children of which four survived infancy. Together they established the "Brurskanken samiske lag" (Brurskanken Sámi Association) one of the first Sámi societies in Norway as well as the Brurskanken Sámi Women's Association. The association's express goal was "to work to establish an eventual school in Nordland for Sámi children, and in general spread information among the Sámi people." The focus on education was likely in resistance to the Havika Sámi School, a private boarding school which prohibited Sámi language and was seen as a method of Sámi Norwegianization.

From 1906-1913 Sámi politics thrived and in 1917, in association with the Brurskanken Sámi Women's Association, the first pan-nordic Sámi National Assembly was held in Trondheim on February 6. Elsa served as the chairwoman and gave the opening speech at the assembly followed other prominent Sámi voices such as Daniel Mortenson and Torkel Tomasson. The assembly gathered around 150 participants and discussed issues such as reindeer herding, education, and further organizing. During the assembly Torkel Tomasson gathered support for a Sámi newspaper, Samefolkets Egen Tidning, that still runs to this day under the name Samefolket (The Sámi People).

== Death and legacy ==
Elsa Laula Renberg died at the age of 53 of tuberculosis in Brønnøy Municipality. She is hailed as one of the foremost influential Sámi activists and politicians. She fought against discrimination via Sweden's “Lapp ska vara lapp” policies and advocated for political organization for Sámi rights.

In 2017 her birthday (November 29) was recognized as Sámi national flag day. The Assembly of 1917 that she organized, is seen as a galvanizing event for Sámi politics and national identity and February 6, the first day of the Sámi Assembly of 1917, is now Sámi National Day.

The formation of the Assembly of 1917 also led to the development of Sámi Council and Sámi parliaments in Norway, Finland, and Sweden who continue to advocate for Sámi rights and issues.
