= 1720 in Norway =

- Centuries: 17th; 18th; 19th; 20th
- Decades: 1700s; 1710s; 1720s; 1730s; 1740s
- See also: 1720 in Denmark; List of years in Norway

Events in the year 1720 in Norway.

== Incumbents ==
- Monarch: Frederick IV.

== Events ==
- 14 July – Denmark–Norway leaves the Great Northern War after the Treaty of Frederiksborg.
- 10 August – The town of Moss was founded.
- 1 November – The Commanding Major Generals South of Dovre is established. It was a four-general board to lead the Norwegian Army following the Great Northern War.
- Severin Seehausen was ennobled, and given the noble family name Svanenhielm.

== Births ==
- 16 March – Cecilie Christine Schøller, socialite (died 1786).
- 2 October – Jens Kraft, mathematician (died 1765 in Denmark).

== Deaths ==
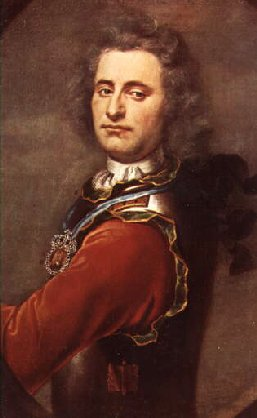
Peter Tordenskjold.

- 25 January – Jens Bircherod, bishop (born 1664).
- 12 November – Peter Tordenskjold, nobleman and naval flag officer (born 1690).
