= Norwegianization =

Forced assimilation of minorities in Norway

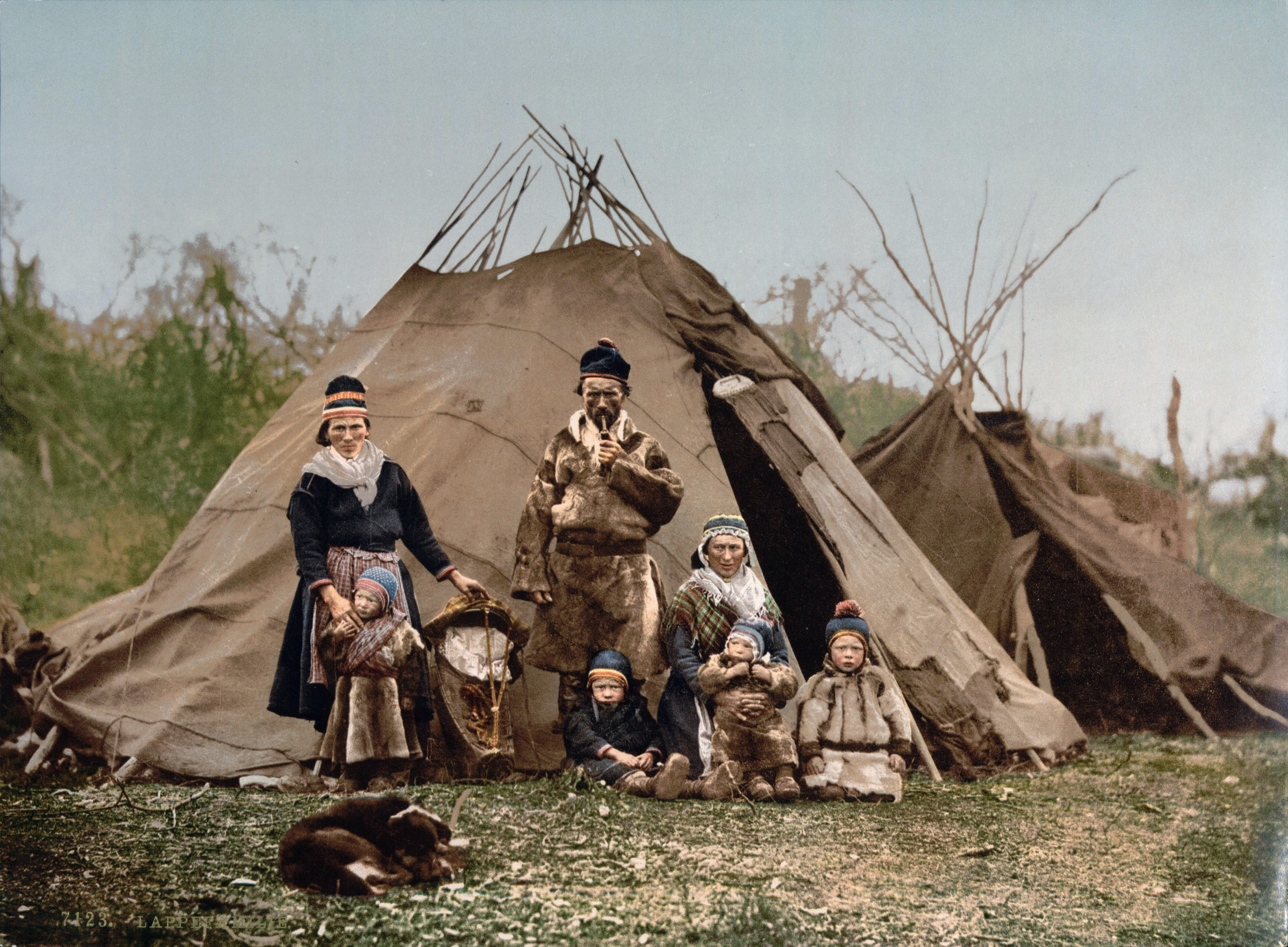
A Sámi family in Kanstadfjorden, around 1900. Fotokromtrykk.

Norwegianization (Norwegian: fornorsking) was an official policy carried out by the Norwegian government directed at the Sámi people, the Kven people and the Forest Finns, in which the goal was to assimilate non-Norwegian-speaking native populations into an ethnically and culturally uniform Norwegian population.

The assimilation process began in the 1700s, and was at that point motivated by a clear religious agenda. Over the course of the 1800s it became increasingly influenced by social Darwinism and nationalism, in which the Sámi people and their culture were regarded as primitive and uncivilised. As such, it was argued that they needed to succumb to the Norwegian nation state.

After the Second World War, the race based argument for assimilation lost significant ideological pull. This was also the period in time in which Norway's welfare system was cemented. As such, the continued assimilation policy was framed as part of the social development of Sámi areas.

In 1997, the King of Norway, HM King Harald V acknowledged the actions of the Norwegian State, and made an official apology on behalf of the government to the Sámi and Kven people, becoming the first representative to do so:

"The state of Norway was founded on the territory of two peoples - the Sámi people and the Norwegians. Sámi history is closely intertwined with Norwegian history. Today, we express our regret on behalf of the state for the injustice committed against the Sámi people through its harsh policy of Norwegianization."

== Missionary work in Sámi areas ==
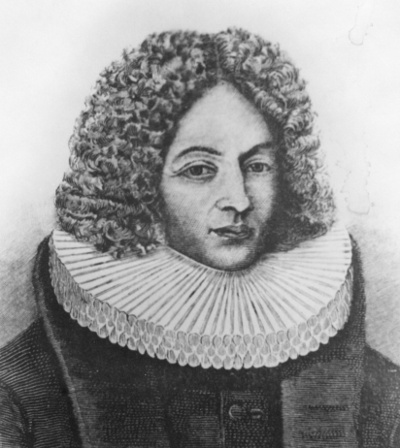
Thomas von Westen (1682–1727) acted as an early leader of the missionary work targeting Sámi people.

In the Middle Ages, the Church conducted missionary work in Sámi areas, initially prioritizing areas at the coast or around the fjords, where an increasing amount of the Norwegian population was settling. The Church and the missionaries decided early on that they should preach to the Sámi in their mother tongue. As such, starting in the 1630s, religious materials were translated into Sámi languages to be used in the Church and for educational purposes.

The most intensive period of missionary work took place between 1650 and 1750. It was organized by the Danish-Norwegian state, and was led by the Norwegian priest Thomas von Westen. In 1714, he became involved in the Danish-Norwegian "Lapplandsmisjonen", which conducted missionary work in Sámi areas. In 1717, he was involved in the establishment of the school Seminarium Lapponicum in Trondheim, in which teachers, priests and missionaries were educated in order to conduct Sámi missionary work. Westen contributed with education in Sámi language and literature, and additionally developed the first Sámi textbooks.

In the beginning, the missionary work and Christian education was carried out in Sámi languages. However, a more nationalistic and civilizational mindset developed over the course of the 1700s and 1800s, during which Sámi language and culture came to be regarded as "feral" and "devilish". As a result, the government's and Church's perception of Sámi languages shifted as well. After this, the languages were regarded as instruments for Sámi spirituality and culture, and thus something that needed to be suppressed.

Some historians consider the assimilation policy of the 1800s to be a result of the increased nationalism that arose during the establishment of the Norwegian nation state following the Norwegian Constituent Assembly election in 1814. Others highlight the links between the theology behind the missionary work of the 1600s and 1700s, and the ideology that was used to justify the later assimilation policies. It has been concluded that the narrative that portrayed the Sámi people as underdeveloped and uncivilized had its origins in theological convictions, and that these informed the subsequent sense of Norwegian Nationalism.

== History ==
Historian Henry Minde and psychologist Stephen James Minton argue that the assimilation of the Sámi population at the hands of the Norwegian government began in earnest in 1851, with Minde identifying the Alta controversy and establishment of the Sámi parliament in 1987 as the end of the policy. Minde divides the Norwegian assimilation policy into four phases.

=== Transition Period (1850–1870) ===
In this period, two different belief systems and ideologies influenced the debate concerning assimilation policies. One branch argued for the active use of Sámi languages in educational and religious environments, while the other argued that all education should be conducted in Norwegian, in order to make the Norwegianization as effective as possible. They were, however, united in their goal of fully assimilating the Sámi population into Norwegian culture and society.

A fund was established by the Storting in 1851, with the express purpose of financing the Norwegianization of Sámi people. The money was used for a number of purposes, among which were the education of teachers, pay rises for teachers with particularly effective Norwegianization methods, and the rewarding of schoolchildren who were quick to learn Norwegian.

=== Consolidation Period (1870–1905) ===
The regulations for schools with Sámi and Kven pupils in Finnmark county and northern Troms county became increasingly strict throughout the later half of the 1800s. The opportunity to use Sámi language as part of the education became more and more limited. Around 1870, the Sámi became the subject of negative scientific attention. The teachings of phrenology were used in order to determine their race and intelligence. To this end, Sámi graves were opened and their skeletons removed.

In 1899, Wexelsenplakaten was passed, an official instruction which forbade Sámi people and Kvens from acting as educators in multilingual schools. This was the beginning of a full-blown assimilation policy, in which the government stated that the goal was to reduce the sense of identity and community within minority groups, and to utilize public institutions in order to foster stronger feelings of Norwegian nationalism in Kven and Sámi communities.

In 1901, the first boarding schools for Sámi and Kven pupils were established. These were also used as chapels, and the priests acted as de facto members of the school boards. The purpose of the boarding schools was to isolate the pupils from their roots and communities, thus making the assimilation process more effective. Sami scholars have highlighted that the process was not as disruptive as it was with other indigenous peoples, as the Sami had already been undergoing a centuries long process of Christianisation before the boarding schools were established.

The 1902 Land Sales Act (Jordsalgsloven) required any potential buyer of land in Finnmark use the Norwegian language on a daily basis, hold Norwegian citizenship, and reside on the property. This affected those who spoke Kven and Sámi, who lacked formal citizenship despite longstanding residence or use of the land, or those who practices nomadic reindeer pastoralism.

At the same time, the Norwegian government conducted a systematic Norwegianization of place names in Finnmark, replacing the original Sámi names with Norwegian ones. This was done in order to normalize and historicize Norwegian settlement in Sámi areas.

This phase of the Norwegianization was ideologically grounded in nationalism and social Darwinism.

Not all communities were affected during this period. Local government correspondences in the Sami and Kven languages were found in the archives of Kistrand between 1860 and 1910, indicating that some communities avoided or did not implement as strong of assimilatory processes as others.

=== Culmination Period (1905–1950) ===
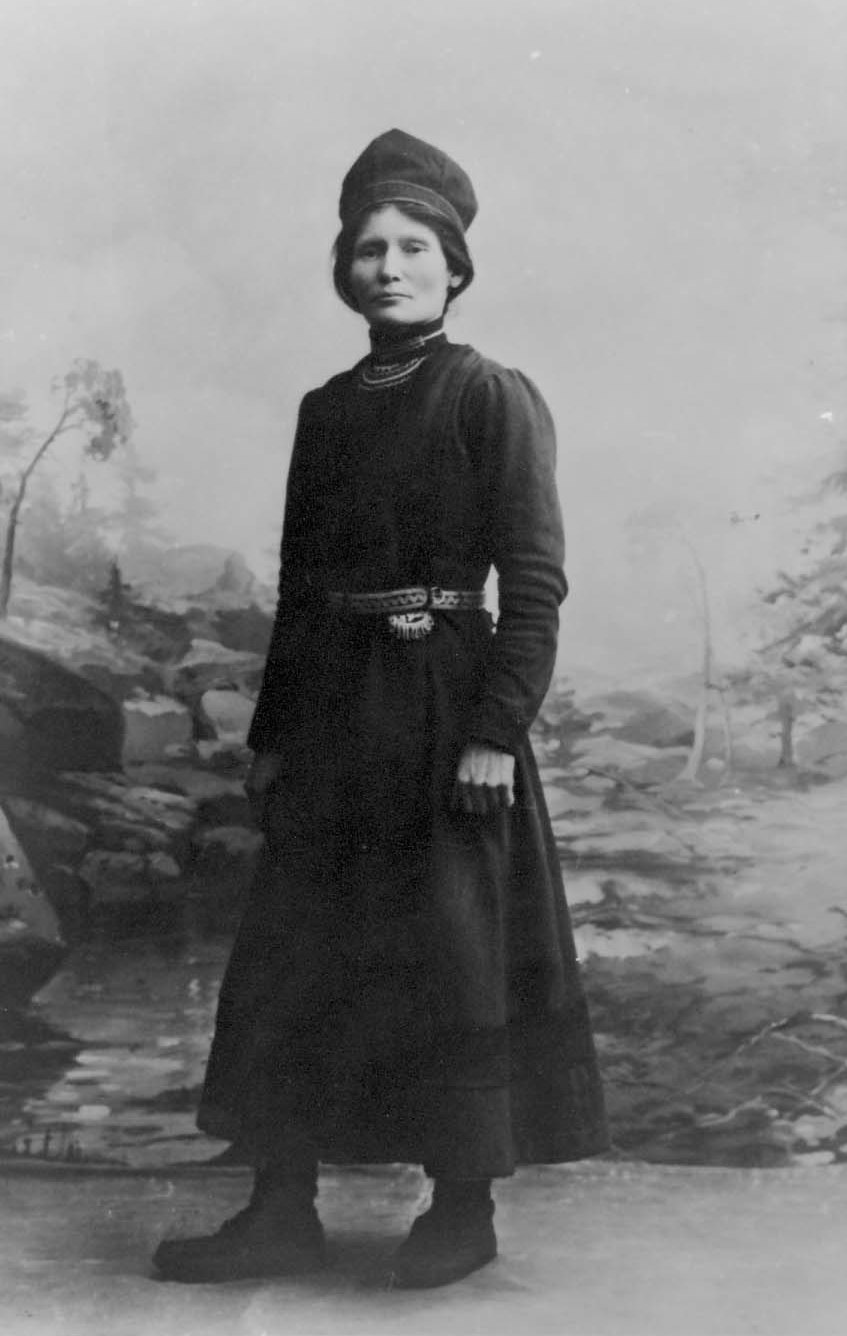
Elsa Laula Renberg was a prolific Sámi activist who opposed and protested against Norwegianization

In this period, the ideological reasoning behind the assimilation policy continued to evolve, influenced in part by the dissolution of the union between Norway and Sweden in 1905.

The scope of the Norwegianization process is clearly illustrated in the ethnic identities reported in censuses from this period. In 1930, 61% of the population in Kvænangen Municipality reported that they were Sámi (44%) or Kven (17%), while 39% described themselves as ethnically Norwegian. In the census from 1950, 0% of the people in the same area reported that they were of Sámi or Kven ethnicity.

==== Sámi opposition and resistance ====
In the time leading up to the First World War, the Sámi opposition to the assimilation policy grew stronger. During the 1906 Norwegian parliamentary election, Sámi politician Isak Saba was elected as a representative for Arbeiderpartiet. In 1907, Just Quigstad published a book that documented the Norwegianization process up until that point. He was also one of the first people to argue for the Sámi people as an ethnic group with claim to their own rights.

The opposition against the Norwegianization culminated in 1917, when the first Sámi Assembly took place in Trondheim. However, despite the increased resistance from the Sámi people, the Norwegian government continued to enforce their assimilation policy well into the 1900s.

The influence of social Darwinism on Norwegian politics continued to be evident. Christen Andreas Brygfjeld (1863-1952), who had a central role in the country's assimilation policy, was clearly influenced by racist ideology, claiming that the "Sámi race" was inferior to the "Norwegian Race". In 1923, he wrote that "the Lapps", a slur used on the Sámi population, lacked both the ability and the motivation to use their language in written form. Furthermore, he described them as the most underdeveloped and loathsome of groups in Finnmark, claiming that they made up a disproportionate portion of the people in need of psychiatric care or special education.

The introduction of the 7-year school in 1936 represented a further tightening of the assimilation policy, as it resulted in the Finnish language being banned in educational settings.

=== Dismantling (1950–1980) ===
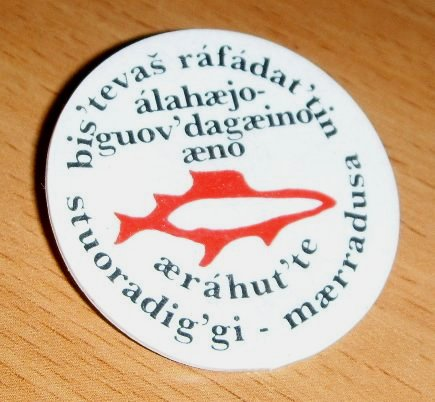
Henry Minde looks at the Alta controversy as a symbolic turning point in the state's attitude toward the Sámi.

Wexelsenplakaten of 1898, which forbade the use of Sámi languages in school settings, continued to be enforced throughout the 1950s, and, in some parts of the country, into the 1960s. On 1 January 1956, during Einar Gerhardsen's third Cabinet, "Samekomiteen" was established. The committee's attitude signaled an important break with the politics and perspectives of the Norwegian government's assimilation policy. It argued that the government's policy concerning the Sámi population should focus on strengthening the position of Sámi people as a group, and proposed a number of measures aimed at achieving equal rights between the Sámi and Norwegians. However, the Sámi people was still not considered to be an ethnic minority, but rather referred to as Sámi-speaking Norwegians. This was because the government thought that a person's relationship to their Sámi culture and identity should be determined by themselves. However, the right to use Sámi languages in education, including as a primary language, was instated in 1967.

Simultaneously, an increased sense of identity sprang forth in Sámi communities. From the mid-1970s, the Sámi people begun to be thought of as an indigenous population, and the fight for Sámi rights was reframed as part of an international movement.

"Samerettsutvalget" was established in the 1980s, with a mandate to assess the political and cultural rights of the Sámi people.

Despite this, there has never been a public investigation into the treatment of Sámi or Kven people at the hands of the Norwegian government. In the same vein, Norwegian authorities have avoided taking responsibility for the consequences the assimilation policies had on both private individuals and the Sámi population as a group.

== Consequences ==
The purpose of the assimilation policy was undoubtedly to eradicate the culture, language, and history that contributed to the formation of Sámi and Kven/Finnish identity. This was true both on the level of the individual and for the groups as entities.

One of the results of the Norwegianization was that the number of Sámi people who stated that they were of Norwegian ethnicity steadily increased over the span of the late 1800s and 1900s. The Norwegianization is also considered to be one of the reasons as to why many people with ethnically Sámi backgrounds developed a negative view of Sámi language and culture. Sámi ethnicity was grouped together with the blind, deaf, and mentally deranged in public censi until 1920. As such, they were thought of as "abnormal", an idea that had its roots in the concept of ethnic cleansing.

The process of Norwegianization resulted in the near elimination of Sámi languages in Norway.

Scholars have referred to the Norwegianization of the Sámi as a cultural genocide. These include the human rights lawyer Láilá Susanne Vars and psychologist Stephen James Minton. In 1923, the Norwegian philologist Torleiv Hannaas referred to the "folkemord" caused by the Norwegian school and language policy on the Sami. "Folkemord" was accepted later as the official Norwegian translation of the term genocide.

== Similar policies ==
Similar policies occurred in other European countries during the same period, including Swedification in Sweden, Danification in Denmark, and Germanization in Germany.

== See also ==
- Sámi history
- Kautokeino rebellion
- Environmental racism in Europe
- Racism in Norway
