= Elin Anna Labba =

Swedish Sámi author (born 1980)

- Joná Gusttu Elin Ánná
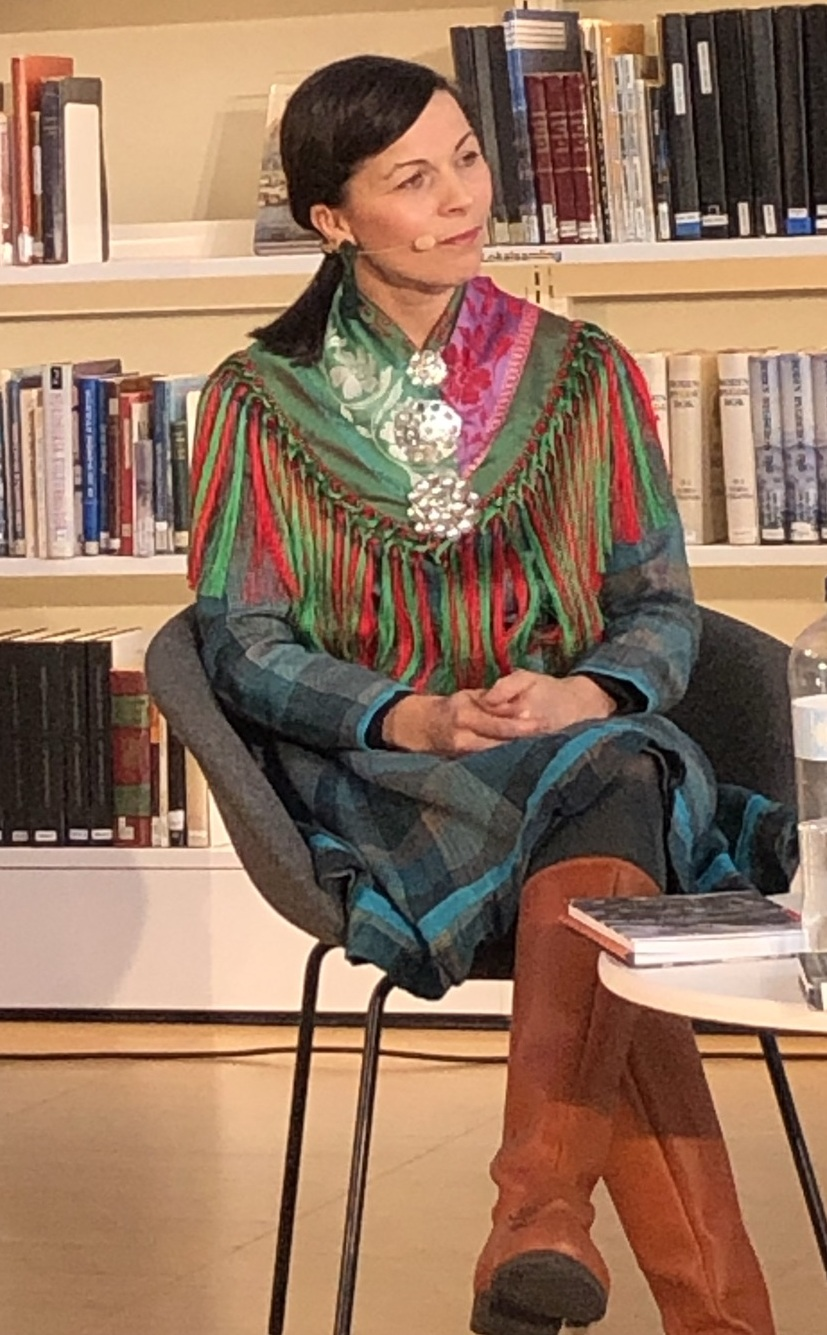
- Born: 30 November 1980 (age 45); Kiruna, Sweden
- Education: University of Gothenburg
- Occupations: Author; journalist
- Spouse: Ol-Duommá
- Children: 3
- Writing career
- Notable awards: August Prize (2020); Norrland Literature Prize (2021); Hedevind Plaquette (2022)

Elin Anna Labba (Northern Sami: Joná Gusttu Elin Ánná; born 30 November 1980) is a Sámi author and journalist from Sweden. She has won multiple prizes for her first book The Rocks Will Echo Our Sorrow: The Forced Displacement of the Northern Sámi (Herrarna satte oss hit: om tvångsförflyttningarna i Sverige), which describes the forced migration of the Sámi from Norway to Sweden from 1919 to 1920.

== Early years and education ==
Elin Anna Labba was born on 30 November 1980 in Kiruna, Sweden, where she also grew up. Her grandmother was Forest Sámi originally from Malå. She moved to Gothenburg to study journalism at the Department of Journalism, Media and Communication at the University of Gothenburg. At the same time she was studying, Labba was also working as a journalist for P4 Norrbotten, SR Sápmi, and the Sámi news magazine Samefolket. She graduated from the University of Gothenburg in 2008.

== Career ==
Since she graduated, Labba worked as the editor-in-chief of Nuorat and as the director of communications at Laponiatjuottjudus. Currently, she is employed as a project manager at the writer's center Tjállegoahte in Jokkmokk, Sweden.

In 2020, she debuted as an author with the Swedish-language book Herrarna satte oss hit: om tvångsförflyttningarna i Sverige, which was translated and released the same year in Northern Sámi under the title Hearrát dat bidje min: bággojohtimiid birra. It was translated from Swedish to Norwegian Bokmål and published in 2021 as Herrene sendte oss hit: om tvangsflyttingen av samene.

== Personal life ==
She and her husband Ol-Duommá have three children. As of December 2023, they lived in Saltdal.

== Awards ==
In 2020, Labba was awarded the August Prize for her book Herrarna satte oss hit: om tvångsförflyttningarna i Sverige. In 2021, she won the Norrland Literature Prize for the same book. In 2022, she was awarded the Hedevind Plaquette.

== Bibliography ==
=== Books ===
- Herrarna satte oss hit: om tvångsförflyttningarna i Sverige, Norstedts 2020, ISBN 9789113101682 (in Swedish)
  - Hearrát dat bidje min: bággojohtimiid birra, Norstedts 2020, ISBN 9789113102436 (translated from Swedish to Northern Sámi by Lea Simma)
  - Herrene sendte oss hit: om tvangsflyttingen av samene, Pax 2021, ISBN 9788253042480 (translated from Swedish to Norwegian Bokmål by Trude Marstein)
  - The Rocks Will Echo Our Sorrow: The Forced Displacement of the Northern Sámi, University of Minnesota Press 2023, ISBN (cloth/jacket edition) 9781517913304, ISBN 9781452970530 (translated from Swedish to English by Fiona Graham)

=== Anthologies ===
- Du blir vad du säger: om hatspråk, yttrandefrihet och vikten av ett demokratiskt samtal, Sjöberg, Henrik, Carlberg, Ingrid, and Bengtsson, Jesper. Norstedts 2021, ISBN 9789113117881 (in Swedish)
- Inifrån Sápmi: vittnesmål från stulet land, red. Patricia Fjellgren and Malin Nord, Verbal 2021, ISBN 9789189155497 (in Swedish)
