= When the Spaniards Were Here =

Hans Christian Andersen play

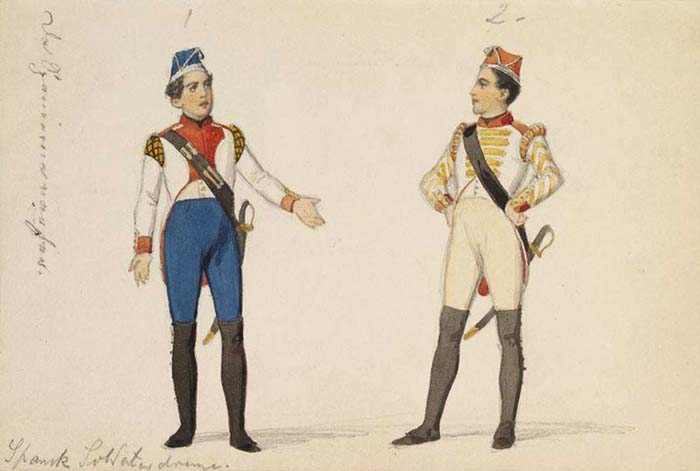
- Costume drawing by Edvard Lehmann for the play: Two Spanish soldiers
- Original language: Danish
- Written by: Hans Christian Andersen
- Genre: Comedy
- Setting: Middelfart

Premiere
- Date: 6 April 1865
- Place: Royal Danish Theatre, Denmark

When the Spaniards Were Here (Da Spanierne var her) is a romantic, comic play by Hans Christian Andersen. It premiered on the Royal Danish Theatre in Copenhagen on 6 April 1865, just a few days after the celebration of Andersen's 60th birthday.

== Composition ==
Andersen's first childhood memory involved Spanish soldiers on Funen. The first time they appear in his writings is in the poem Soldaten (The Soldier) from 1830. The male protagonist of his play Skilles og mødes was also a Spanish soldier. In 1835. Andersen wrote a vaudeville titled Spanierne i Odense (The Spaniards in Odense) which never premiered. In 1865, he adapted it into the play When the Spaniards Were Here, changing the setting from Odense to Middelfart.

== Production history ==
The play premiered at the Royal Danish Theatre on 6 April 1976. The theatre was sold out and members of the royal family were present at the event. It played seven times. The cast included;

- Fritz Hultmann as Carl Bryske
- Louise Sahlgreen as Madam
- Agnes Lange as Herminia
- Louise Phister as etatsrådinde Prip

== Image gallery ==
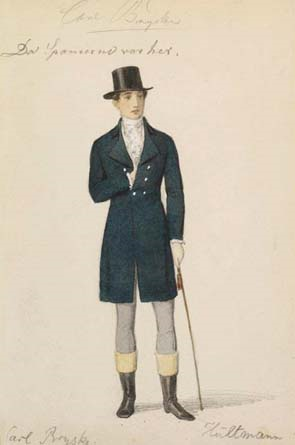
Fritz Hultmann as Carl Bryske

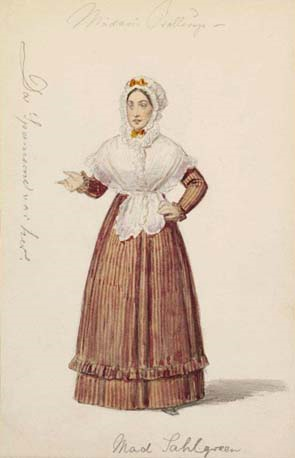
Louise Sahlgreen as Madam

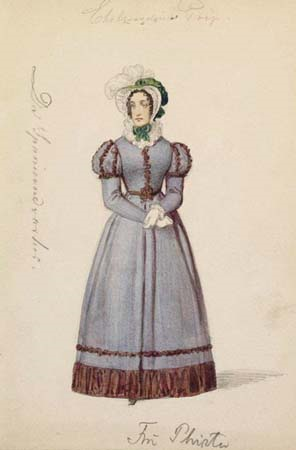
Louise Phister as Madam

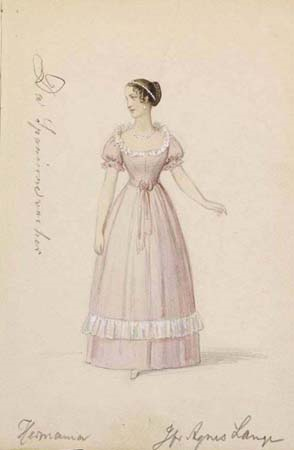
Agnes Lange as Herminia
