= 1722 in Norway =

- Centuries: 16th; 17th; 18th; 19th; 20th
- Decades: 1700s; 1710s; 1720s; 1730s; 1740s
- See also: 1722 in Denmark; List of years in Norway

Events in the year 1722 in Norway.

== Incumbents ==
- Monarch: Frederick IV.

== Events ==
- 17 April - Ditlev Vibe was appointed Governor-general of Norway.
- May - The Norwegian Slottsloven commission was dissolved.

=== Undated ===
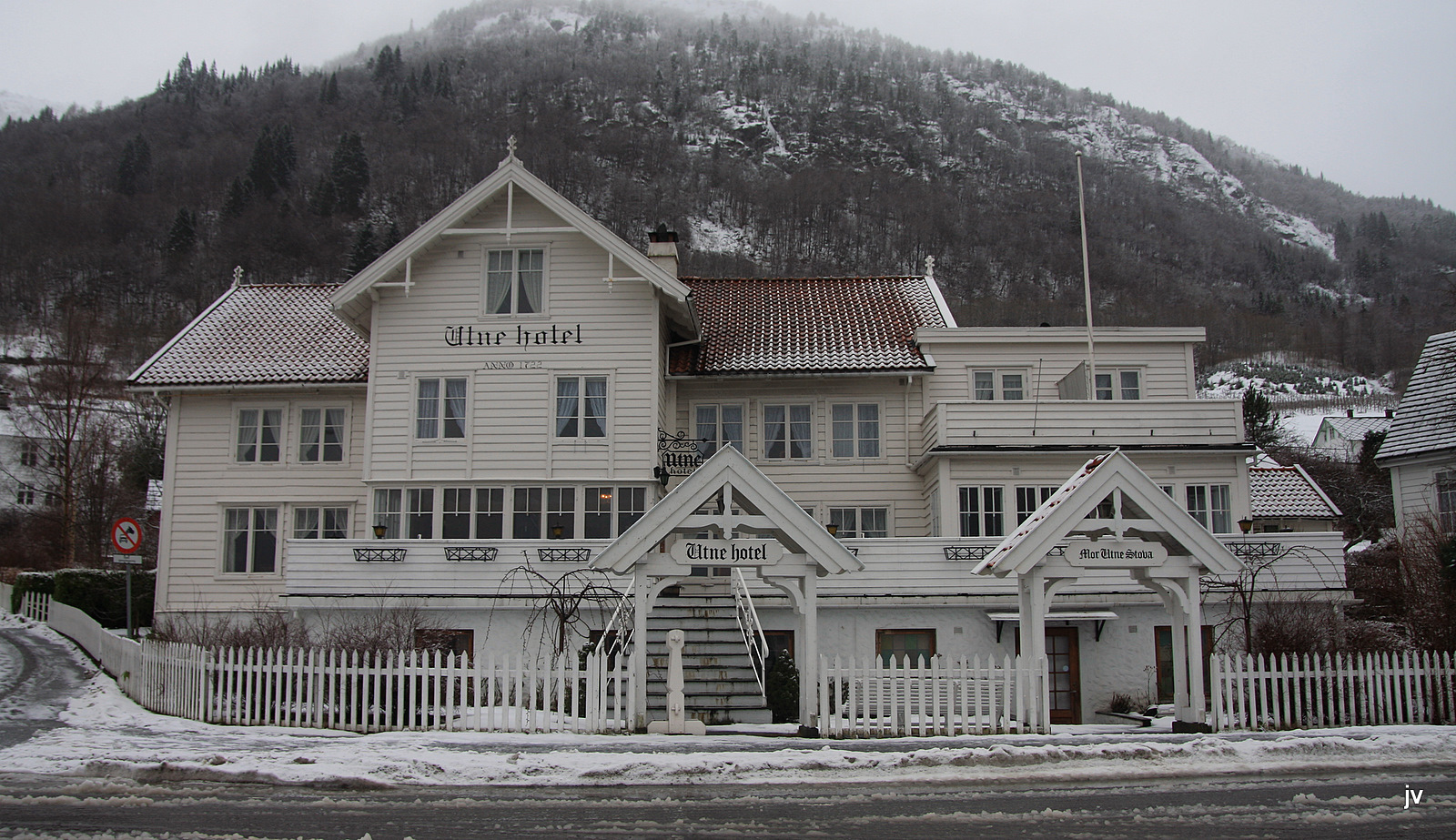
Utne hotel

- Utne Hotel in Utne is founded (Norway's oldest hotel in continuous operation).

== Arts and literature ==
- Ludvig Holbergs comedy plays «Den Politiske Kandestøber», «Den vægelsindede», Jean de France eller Hans Frandsen, Jeppe på bjerget and Mester Gert Westphaler is first published.

== Births ==
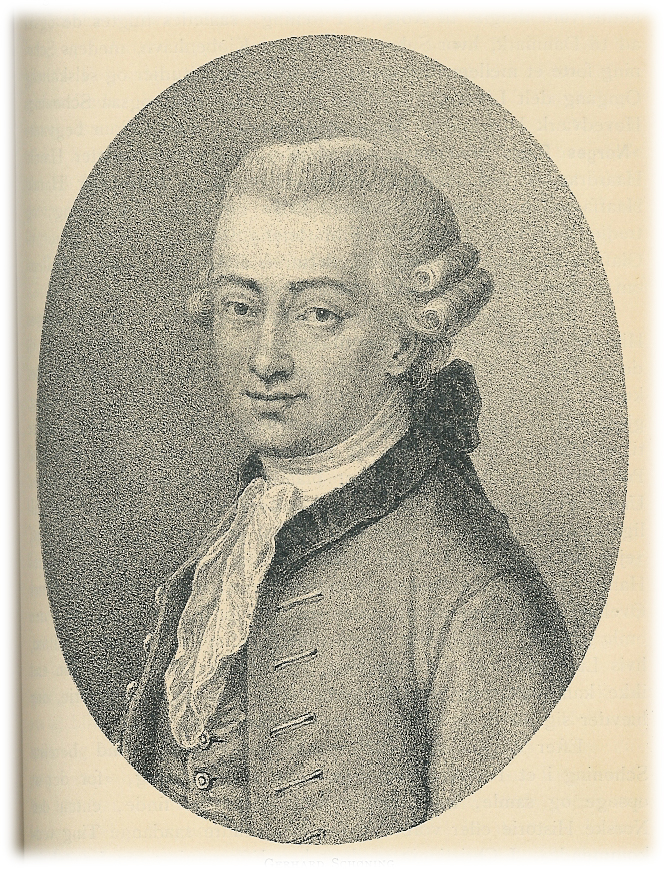
Gerhard Schøning

- 2 May - Gerhard Schøning, historian (died 1780 in Denmark).
