= 1719 in Norway =

- Centuries: 17th; 18th; 19th; 20th
- Decades: 1690s; 1700s; 1710s; 1720s; 1730s
- See also: 1719 in Denmark; List of years in Norway

Events in the year 1719 in Norway.

== Incumbents ==
- Monarch: Frederick IV.

== Events ==
- January – The Carolean Death March.
- Postvesenet became state owned.

== Births ==
- 31 December – Severin Leopoldus Løvenskiold, landowner (died 1776 in Denmark).

== Deaths ==
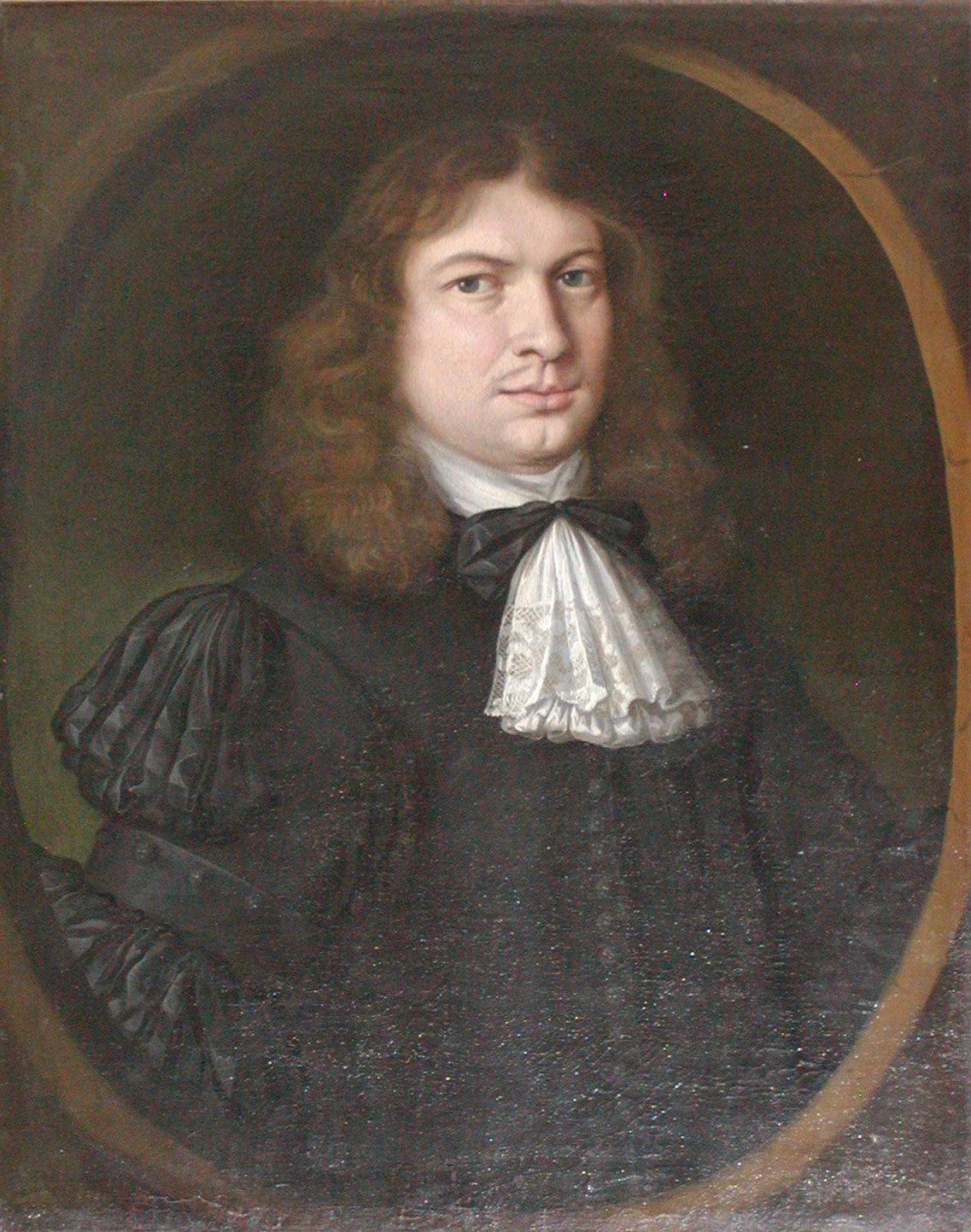
Tormod Torfæus, known for Historia rerum Norvegicarum.

- 23 May – Gerhard Treschow, merchant and industrial pioneer (born c. 1659).
- 31 July – Thormodus Torfæus, historian (born 1636 in Iceland).
- Nils Engelhart, priest, pietist pioneer (born c.1668).
