= 1723 in Norway =

- Centuries: 16th; 17th; 18th; 19th; 20th
- Decades: 1700s; 1710s; 1720s; 1730s; 1740s
- See also: 1723 in Denmark; List of years in Norway

Events in the year 1723 in Norway.

== Incumbents ==
- Monarch: Frederick IV.

== Events ==
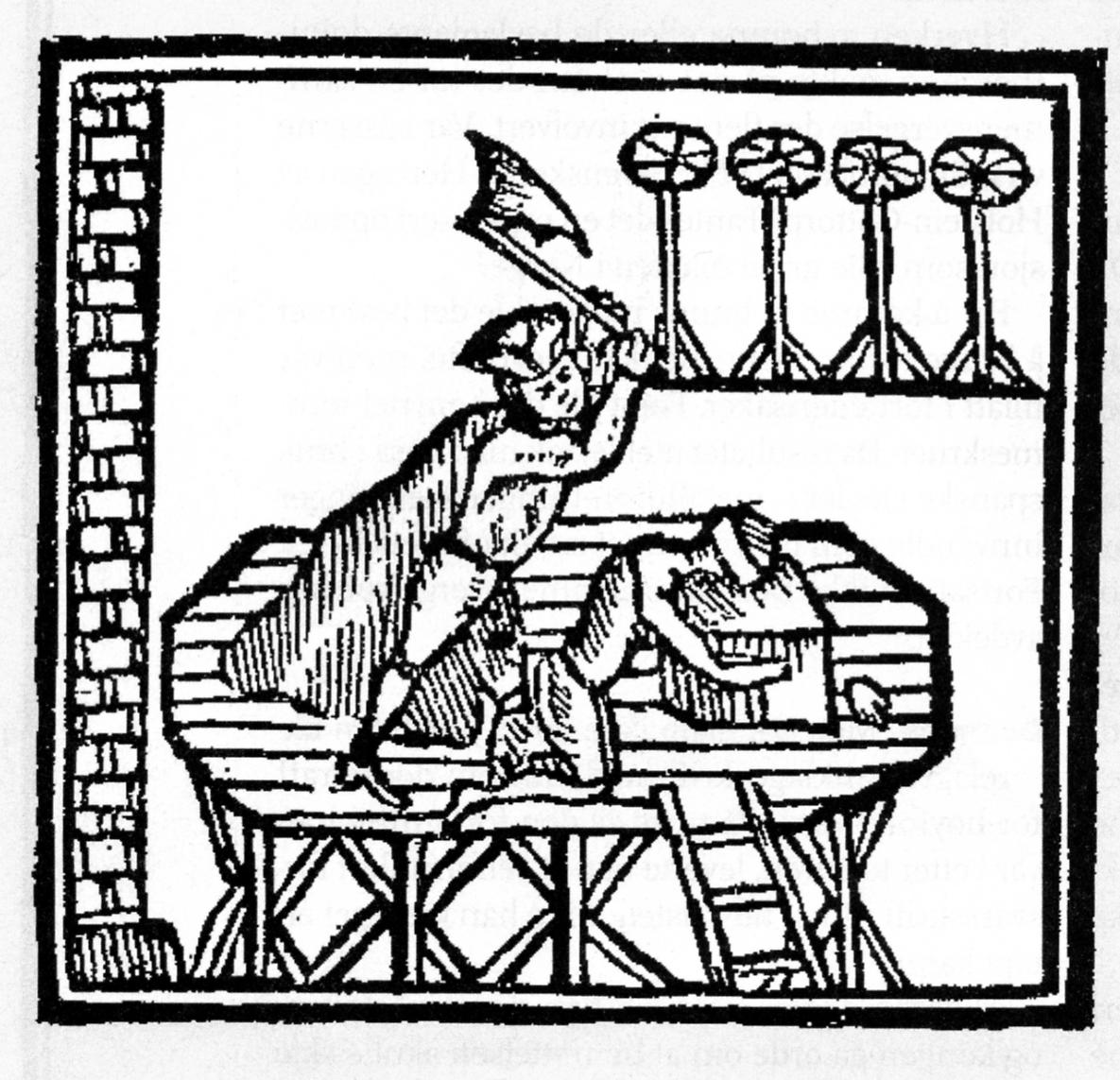
The execution of Povel Juel

- 8 March – The Povel Juel Plot: Povel Juel was executed in Copenhagen, for his plans to depose Frederick IV as King of Norway.
- 7 May – The town of Arendal was given market town privileges.
- The town of Risør was given market town privileges.

== Arts and literature ==
- The Nærøy manuscript was made.
- Ludvig Holbergs comedy plays «Jacob von Tyboe», «Erasmus Montanus», Den stundesløse and other comedy plays is first published.

== Births ==
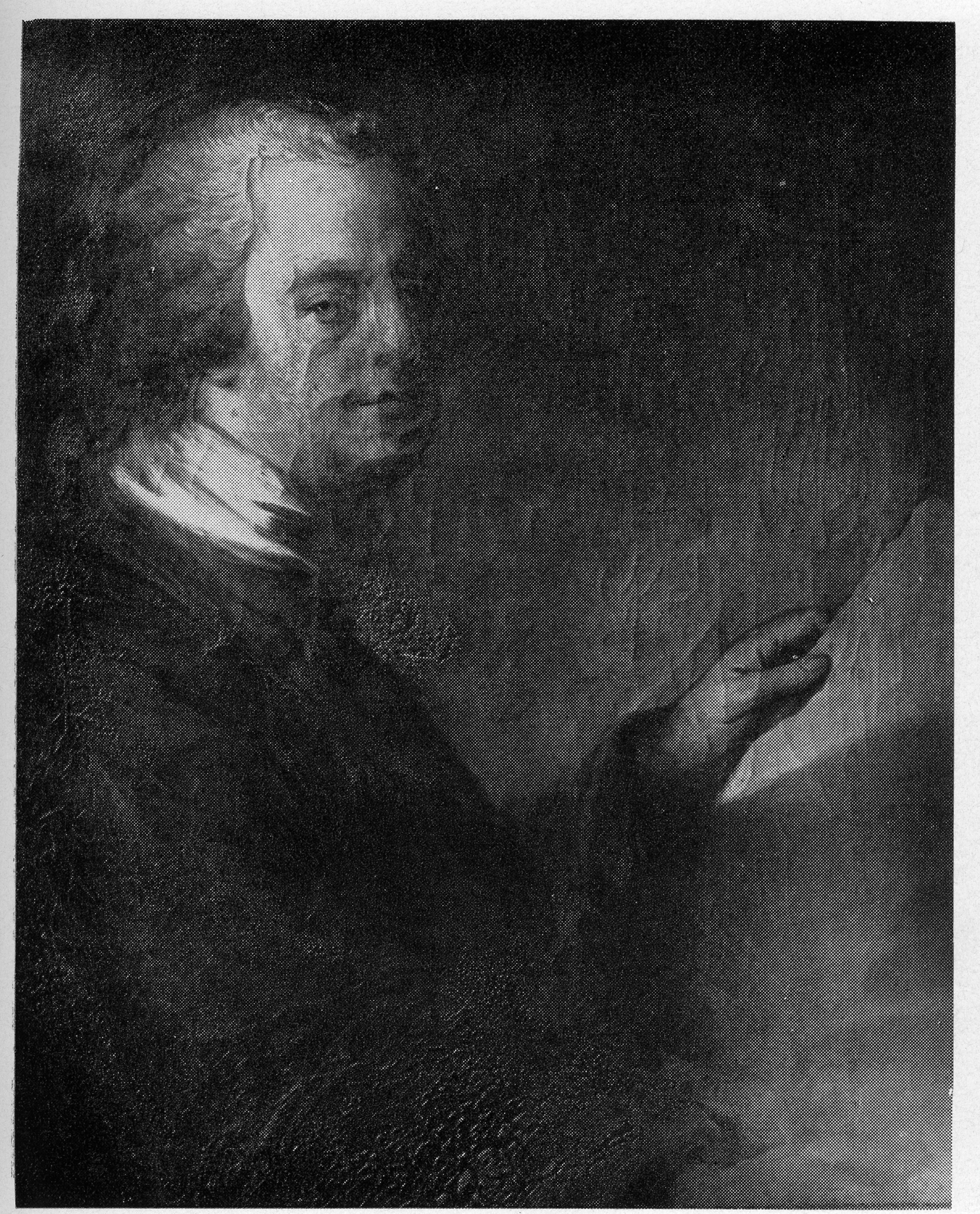
Peter Ascanius

- 9 May – Ludvig Daae, priest and landowner (died 1786).
- 24 May – Peter Ascanius, biologist (died 1803).
- 24 November – Jens Essendrop, clergyman, civil servant and topographical writer (died 1801).

== Deaths ==
- 14 November – Axel Rosenkrantz, landowner, baron and civil servant (b 1670).
