= Astri Aasen =

Norwegian painter (1875–1935)

- Astri Aasen
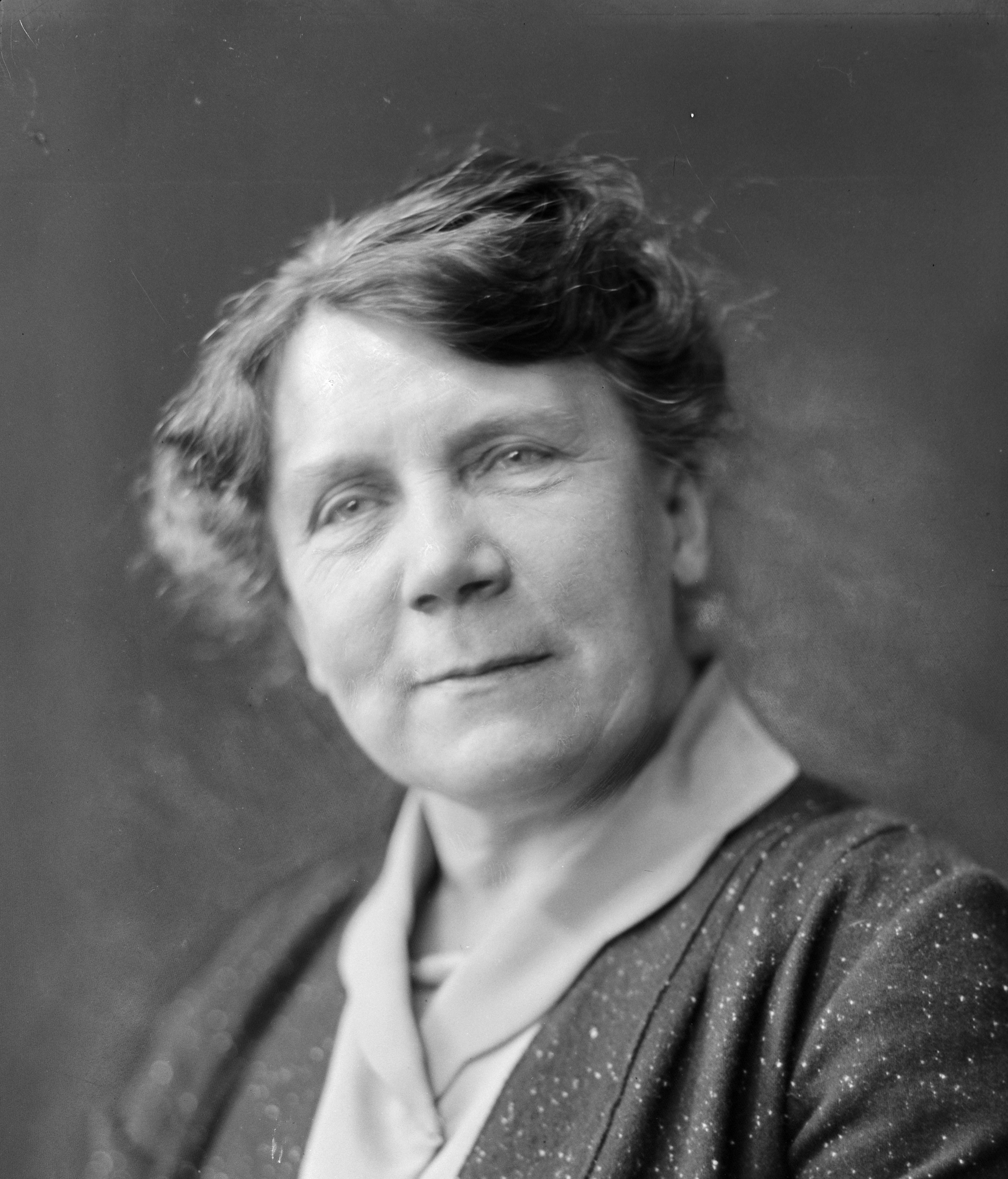
- Astri Aasen in 1932
- Born: September 3, 1875
- Died: October 10, 1935 (aged 60)
- Notable work: Sámi portraits
- Style: naturalism

Astri Aasen (3 September 1875 – 10 October 1935) was a Norwegian painter. She spent most of her life in the city of Trondheim, and in the early 20th century, was taught to paint by Harriet Backer in Oslo. She created a series of portraits of those who attended the first Sámi assembly in 1917. The portraits were acquired by the Sámediggi (Sámi parliament) in the late 20th century, where they remain as of 2021. Following her death, a scholarship for young artists was created by her family.

== Early life ==
Aasen was born on 3 September 1875 to Anna Christine Næss and Nils Aasen. Her father was a jeweler, and her mother died of tuberculosis when Aasen was two. Following her mother's death, her father married Næss's sister, and they cared for the four siblings. Two of her sisters died when she was about 17 years old.

== Career ==
In Aasen's young adult life, she became a retoucher in the city of Ålesund, and learned to paint in Bergen when she was 25 years old (around the year 1900). For a short time around 1903, and continuing between 1907 and 1909, she was trained by the painter Harriet Backer in Oslo (then Kristiania). According to the writer Glenny Alfsen, her artistic work consisted of an "uncomplicated naturalism": she created portraits without extraneous interpretation. Following the death of her parents, she spent most of her life in the Norwegian city of Trondheim, where she had at least one exhibition and lived with her sister. She exhibited in many cities over her life — including Paris, Capri, Florence, and Naples — but regularly came back to Trondheim. Between 1900 and 1912, she was also taught by the artists Asor Hansen, Viggo Johansen, Christian Krohg, Halfdan Strøm, and Léon Bonnat.

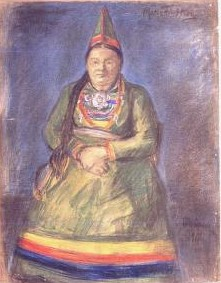
Aasen's portrait of Marie Finskog in 1917

Between 6 February and 10 February 1917, the first Sámi assembly took place, a transnational conference for the Sámi of Norway, Sweden, Russia, and Denmark. The event was pivotal in Sámi political consciousness as one of the first advocating for a unified Sámi state. Aasen visited the assembly to create pastel portraits of the attendees, some of which were named after specific people (such as one for Daniel Mortensen), and some of which were undistinguished (such as Old Sámi Woman). The portraits mostly depict the chests and heads of congress participants, and all of them were drawn quickly.

One of these portraits was that of Marie Finskog, who lived from 1851 to 1927. Finskog was a South Sámi political rights activist who talked about the Sámi's economic situation as not being due to any inherent poverty of the group, but as the result of an "oppressed situation". In Aasen's portrait, Finskog is wearing a green gákti, a kind of dress. Historically, the wearing of a gákti was hindered by pastor Lars Levi Laestadius's fundamentalist branch of Christianity (Laestadianism), though they increased in popularity in the 1840s. Bart Pushaw, a historian of the circumpolar region, said that Aasen was aware of acts of violence connected to Laestadianism — such as the Kautokeino rebellion of 1852 in the hamlet of the same name — when she painted Finskog. Since pieces of the underlying yellow canvas show through the painting (such as in Finskog's gákti), the painting was likely completed shortly after Aasen began. This quick and unpolished technique allowed her to paint many participants of the conference, and according to Pushaw, gave her portrait of Finskog a "more imaginative and even modern rendering" by rejecting "precise verisimilitude". She also gifted some of her portraits to their subjects. She created three paintings of the activist Thorkel Jonassen, but only gave him one.

Many of Aasen's portraits were of activists for civil rights of the Sámi. Jonassen, for instance, was an activist who believed that the Sámi had no moral obligation to pay taxes to their colonial governments. After the conference, Valdemar Lindholm for the magazine Idun wrote that the paintings were of "interesting types" — a view seen by Pushaw as exoticising the Sámi and contributing to ignorance of their culture. Pushaw says that figures like Finskog were not "passive participant[s]" in the congress or their portraits, but active social reformists across the Nordic region.

== Death and legacy ==
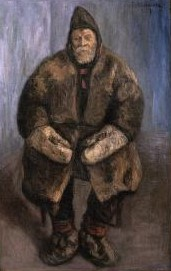
Aasen's portrait of Thorkel Jonassen in 1917

On 10 October 1935, about a month after her 60th birthday, Aasen died of a stroke. Eight years later, the art association of Trondheim created a memorial exhibit of her work, and her family established an annual scholarship for young painters in her name: Astri Aasens gave (Astri Aasen's gift).

Many of her paintings of the Sámi congress were recovered in 1995. They were obtained by the Sámediggi (Sámi parliament) in Kárášjohka two years later. Her gifted portrait of Jonassen was also acquired by the Sámediggi. One of her portraits of him became a postcard, another was acquired by a museum in Lierne Municipality, and another was posted in a school for Sámi youth in Snåsa Municipality. Following the congress, Nordic states began a system of extensive violence and assimilation that stalled much of their progress. Aasen's work in Snåsa, according to Pushaw, "retained visibility" of Sámi political struggle for its students, and showed that progress was possible.

The sketchbooks of her youth, with one drawing from when she was 14, are held by the Trondheim Art Association as of 2018. According to art curator Rebeka Helena Blikstad, they show that, like many women artists of the time, she was interested in portraiture and interior painting, but also geometric shapes of a "purely abstract form". As of 2021, her paintings of the congress remain in the Sámediggi's collections.
