= Anna Nielsen (1803–1856) =

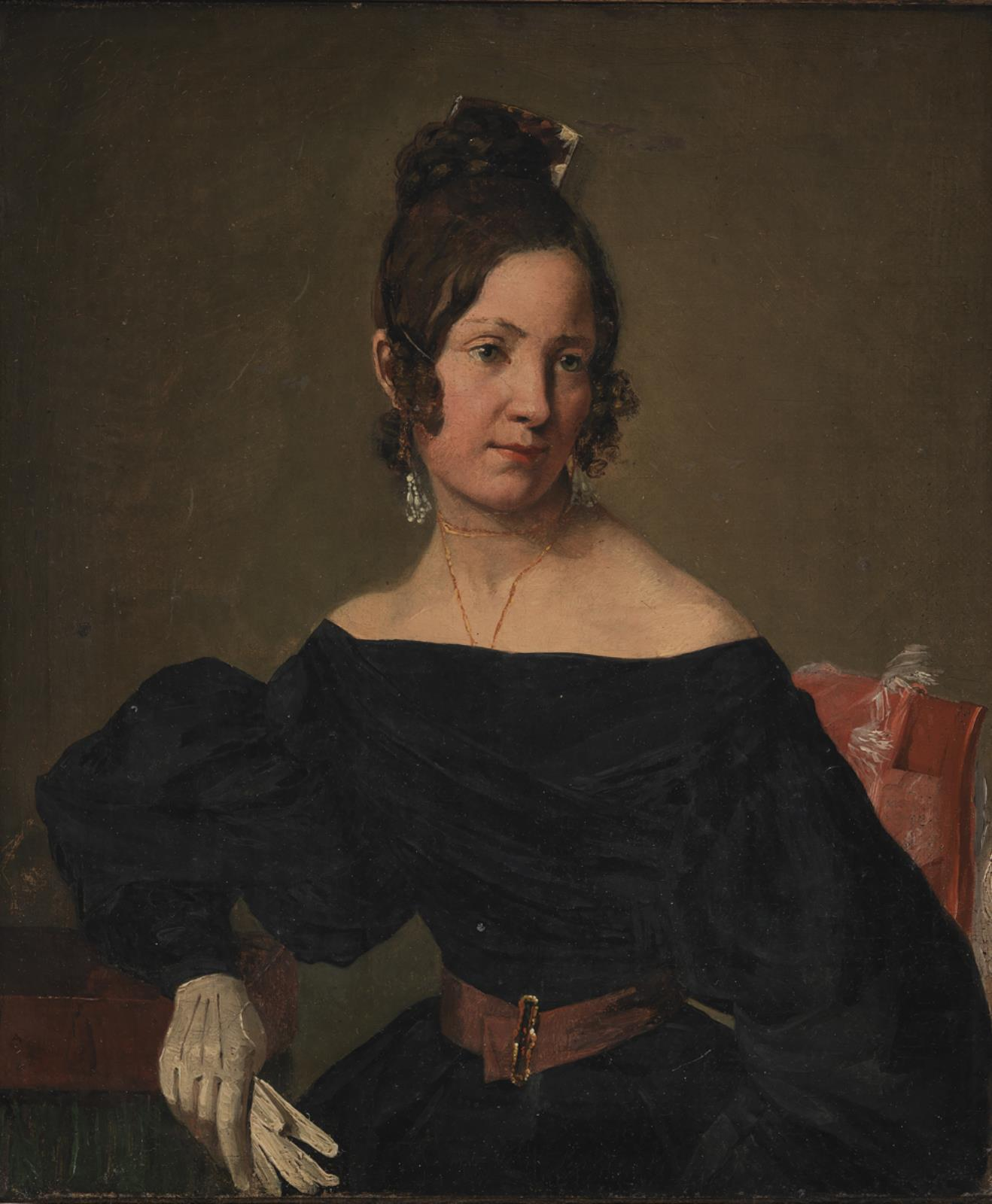
Anna Nielsen by Carl Løfter, c. 1835

Anna Helena Dorothea Nielsen, née Brenöe, (September 4, 1803 – July 20, 1856), was a Danish stage actress and opera singer (mezzo-soprano). She was one of the most famous female stage artists in Denmark of her time. She was a mentor for many talents, such as Louise Phister and her private home was a center of the theatre world.

== Biography ==
Born in Copenhagen to the compass-maker Peter Christian Brenøe and Olave Frederikke Caroline Leth. She was educated in a girls' school until her father was ruined, and was a member in the drama society there. She was also a student of a master of the chapel at the Royal Danish Theatre. She was a tall and blue-eyed blonde. She was accepted as a student at the theatre, where she was given Johanne Rosing as her mentor.

She debuted in the title role of Dyveke by Ole Johan Samsøe on the Royal Danish Theatre in Copenhagen in 1821, and made a great success. She was described as versatile, with a fine singing voice, vivid, and recommended for her natural, sensitive and poetic way of acting, her best interpretation were repressed but strong emotion. Initially much used for the leading roles of heroine, she eventually performed all sorts of parts. She was active on stage until her death. As was common in her time and place, she was active within both opera and theatre. She played heroine in both theatre and opera, often in the part of "Nordic maiden". She was famed for her parts in the work of Adam Oehlenschläger, and contributed to the breakthrough for the vaudevilles of J. L. Heiberg. Søren Kierkegaard called her an interpreter of femininity. She was one of the strongest speakers in favour of a realistic way of acting at the theatre.

She was married in 1823 to the Norwegian violinist Frederik Thorkildsen Wexschall, (separated in 1831) and in 1834 to the actor Peder Nielsen and had one daughter. The fact that she divorced her second spouse in order to marry another was considered scandalous.

== List of roles ==
=== 1820s ===
- 1821 De lystige passagerer as Constance
- 1821 Dyveke as Dyveke
- 1821 Falsk undseelse as Emmy
- 1821 Nonnerne as Euphemia
- 1821 Ringen as Henriette von Darring
- 1822 Bagtalelsens skole as Maria
- 1822 Barselstuen as Stine Isenkræmmers
- 1822 Den politiske kandestøber as Raadsherreinde
- 1822 Herman Von Unna as Ida
- 1822 Medbejlerne as Nancy Ømling
- 1822 Ulysses von Ithacia as Juno
- 1823 Bagtalelsens skole as Maria
- 1823 Barselstuen as Stine Isenkræmmers
- 1823 Den politiske kandestøber as Raadsherreinde
- 1823 Det stille vand har den dybe grund as Baronesse von Holmbach, rig ung enke
- 1823 Dyveke as Dyveke, Christians elskede
- 1823 Nonnerne as Euphemia
- 1823 Ulysses von Ithacia as Juno
- 1824 Barselstuen as Stine Isenkræmmers
- 1824 De lystige passagerer as Constance
- 1824 De to dage as Constance
- 1824 De to poststationer as Angelique
- 1824 Hekseri as Terentia, Leanders fæstemø
- 1825 Bagtalelsens skole as Maria
- 1825 Barberen i Sevilla as Rosine
- 1825 Høstgildet as Anna
- 1826 Bagtalelsens skole as Maria
- 1826 Entreprenøren i knibe as Merline
- 1826 Ringen as Henriette von Darring
- 1826 Sovedrikken as Charlotte
- 1827 Bagtalelsens skole as Maria
- 1827 Barselstuen as Ingeborg Blytækkers
- 1827 De to poststationer as Angelique
- 1827 Gert Westphaler as Leonora
- 1828 Peters bryllup as Anna
- 1829 Bagtalelsens skole as Maria

=== 1830s ===
- 1830 Bagtalelsens skole as Maria
- 1830 Lønkammeret as Cecile
- 1831 Balders død as Nanna
- 1831 Barselstuen as Ingeborg Blytækkers
- 1831 Pigen fra Mrienborg as Cathinka
- 1831 Ringen as Ubekendt
- 1832 Bagtalelsens skole as Maria
- 1833 Barselstuen as Frue
- 1833 Den sorte mand as Mistress, Johnsons kone
- 1834 Dyveke as Dyveke, Christians elskede
- 1834 Figaros giftermaal as Grevinden
- 1834 Niels Ebbesen af Nørreris as Jutta
- 1835 Barselstuen as Ingeborg Blytækkers
- 1835 Machbeth as Lady Macbeth
- 1835 Herman Von Unna as Sophia
- 1835 Ulysses von Ithacia as Juno
- 1836 Den skinsyge kone as Mistress Oakley
- 1836 Emilie Galotti as Grevinde Orsina
- 1837 De fire formyndere as Madam Prim

=== 1840s ===
- 1843 'Macbeth as Lady Macbeth
- 1844 Jægerne as Madam Warberger
- 1844 Kalifen af Bagdad as Enke
- 1845 Romeo og Julie as Fru Capulet
- 1846 Bagtalelsens skole as Mistress Candour
- 1846 Den adelige borger as Madame Jourdain
- 1847 Macbeth as Lady Macbeth

=== 1850s ===
- 1850 Naar enden er god Rousillon
- 1851 'Hamlet as Gertrud
- 1856 'Kongens læge as Grevinden af Rousillon
