= 1721 in Norway =

- Centuries: 16th; 17th; 18th; 19th; 20th
- Decades: 1700s; 1710s; 1720s; 1730s; 1740s
- See also: 1721 in Denmark; List of years in Norway

Events in the year 1721 in Norway.

== Incumbents ==
- Monarch: Frederick IV.

== Events ==
- The Bergen Greenland Company was founded.
- 2 May – Hans Egede departed with three ships from Bergen to Greenland, starting the Danish-Norwegian colonization of Greenland.
- 1 August – The King orders a large sale of church property in Norway.
- 10 September – Great Northern War ends.
- 21 December – Niels Tygesen Knag was ennobled, and given the noble family name Knagenhjelm.

== Deaths ==
- 15 February – Tørres Christensen, merchant, ship owner, land owner (born 1664).
