= 1718 in Norway =

- Centuries: 16th; 17th; 18th; 19th; 20th
- Decades: 1690s; 1700s; 1710s; 1720s; 1730s
- See also: 1718 in Denmark; List of years in Norway

Events in the year 1718 in Norway.

== Incumbents ==
- Monarch: Frederick IV.

== Events ==
- 29 August - 10,000 men under the command of Lieutenant-general Carl Gustaf Armfeldt attacked Trøndelag from Jemtland.
- 30 November - King Karl XII was shot and killed at the Siege of Fredriksten fortress.

== Births ==
- 26 February - Johan Ernst Gunnerus, bishop and botanist (died 1773)
- 29 December - Ole Nilsen Weierholt, wood carver (died 1792)
- Anders Olsen, trader, explorer and colonial administrator (died 1786)

== Deaths ==
- 8 February – Henrik Adeler, civil servant and politician (born 1660).
- 16 May – Jonas Danilssønn Ramus, priest and historian (born 1649)
- 9 September – Caspar Herman Hausmann, general, lumber merchant and squire (born 1653)
- 30 November – King Karl XII of Sweden (born 1682)
