= Torkel Tomasson =

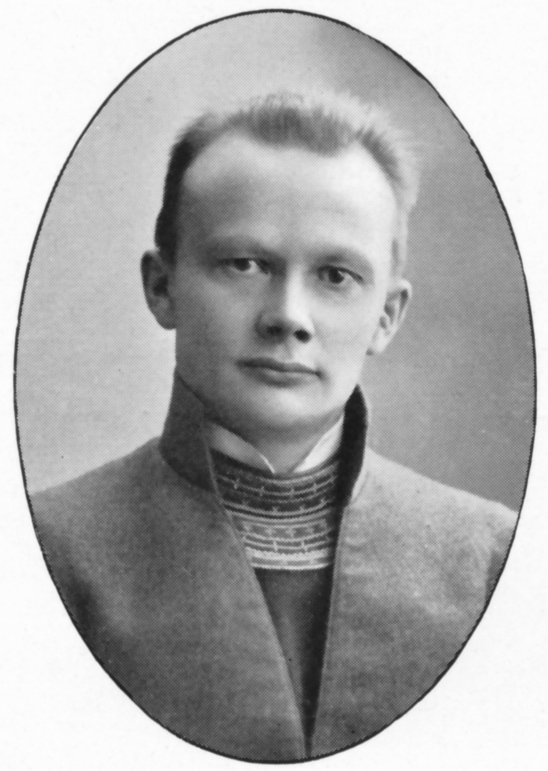
- Born: April 10, 1881; Seltjärnsmon, Ångermanland, Sweden
- Died: December 7, 1940 (aged 59)
- Education: Uppsala University
- Occupations: Publisher and journalist

Torkel Tomasson (10 April 1881 – 7 December 1940) was a Sámi newspaper editor and public figure who worked to promote Sámi identity and rights.

== Early life ==
Tomasson was born in Seltjärnsmon in Ångermanland province in northern Sweden. His parents, Nilsson and Lisa Torkelsdotter, were reindeer herders and part of the Vilhelmina Southern Sámi community.

Before he was 13, Torkel Tomasson had two years of education at a Swedish Mission Society school in Gafsele after which he started working in reindeer husbandry. In 1904, at the age of 25, they returned to education attending a folk high school in Övertorneå and a gymnasium in Stockholm, finally graduating in 1912. The following year, he enrolled at Uppsala University and earned his degree in autumn 1915.

== Sámi activism ==
During his student days, Tomasson became interested early in Sámi political work. In 1904 he was part of a deputation with Elsa Laula and others who traveled to Stockholm to present views of the Sámi. During this trip, the first national Sámi organization in Sweden, the Central Lappish Union, was formed. Tomasson served as its secretary. That same year, he began publishing Lapparnes egen tidning (The Lapps' Own Newspaper), which closed after only five issues.

After completing his studies, Tomasson again began to work actively for the Sámi cause, playing a prominent role in the Sámi Assembly of 1917. When the first national meeting of the Swedish Sámi was held in Östersund in 1918, Tomasson was a dominant figure. The meeting, which covered pressing legal issues around Sámi settlements, the reindeer herding, and the schooling of Sámi children, ended with the reformation of the Central Lappish Union.

At the meeting, Tomasson also gathered backing to launch a new newspaper, Samefolkets Egen Tidning (The Sámi People's Newspaper). In the first issue, Tomasson called for people to use the word Sámi instead of Lapp, both as an expression of pride in the Sámi people and because of negative associations in Swedish with the word Lapp. Tomasson served as editor-in-chief of the paper until his death in 1940, publishing many articles on Sámi culture and identity. In 1960, Samefolkets egen tidning was rebranded as Samefolket (The Sámi People).

== Ethnographic work ==
Tomasson was very interested in the ancient culture of the Sámi. In 1917, he conducted interviews with 26 Sámi elders, most of whom had grown up during the 1850s and 1860s. Most of the interviews were conducted in Vilhelmina, but he also recorded in Tärnaby, Sorsele, Härjedalen, and Jämtland. The recordings contain extensive descriptions of Southern Sámi fairy tales, folklore, and traditions. Tomasson's material is unique in that he and the interview subjects conversed in their native Southern Sámi language. A Swedish-translation of the recordings was published in 1988.
