= Swedish Mission Society =

Swedish organization for Sámi mission work

- Formation: 1835
- Dissolved: 2001
- Type: Christian mission organization
- Official language: Swedish
- Parent organization: Church of Sweden

The Swedish Mission Society (Swedish: Svenska Missionssällskapet (SMS), later Svenska Missionssällskapet Kyrkan och Samerna), was a Swedish Christian organization to promote mission work among the Sámi in Sweden.

== History ==
The Swedish Mission Society was founded in 1835 by George Scott, Samuel Owen, Johan Olof Wallin, Mathias Rosenblad, and Carl Fredrik af Wingård, with the aim of promoting mission work among the Sámi in Lappmarken through direct missionary work and by promoting public interest. The task included organizing missionary church services, publishing missionary tracts, supporting young men who wanted to be trained as missionaries and catechists in Lappmarken.

In 1839, SMS established three mission schools for Sámi children in Knaften, Mårdsele and Bastuträsk. A few years later, a school for Sámi girls was started in Tannsele. Further mission schools were established in the 1850s, including in Gafsele, Bäsksele and Glommersträsk. About fifty catechists and teachers, male and female, were sent out. The Swedish Mission Society also supported several foreign missionary societies and sent Theodore Hamberg as a missionary to China in 1846. The organization was a forerunner of the Swedish Church Mission, founded in 1874, after which it focused exclusively on activities in Sápmi. Sámi activist Torkel Tomasson attended a Swedish Mission Society school for a time.

The Swedish Mission Society took over the activities of the Friends of the Lapland Mission in 1934, when the latter was closed down. The preacher August Lundberg and the Friends of the Lapland Mission had also taken the initiative to build Lannavaara Church, which was consecrated in 1934. The Swedish Mission Society was responsible for running the church until 1954.

The Swedish Mission Society, with Bishop Bengt Jonzon of Luleå as the driving force, founded the Sámi Folk High School in Jokkmokk in 1942 and financed its activities until 1972.

In 1961 the society changed its name to Svenska Missionssällskapet Kyrkan och Samerna ('the Swedish Missionary Society Church and the Sami'). It was dissolved in 2001. It has to some extent lived on in the Foundation Missionssällskapet Kyrkan och Samerna, based in Luleå and linked to the dioceses of Luleå and Härnösand.
