= 1726 in Norway =

- Centuries: 16th; 17th; 18th; 19th; 20th
- Decades: 1700s; 1710s; 1720s; 1730s; 1740s
- See also: 1726 in Denmark; List of years in Norway

Events in the year 1726 in Norway.

== Incumbents ==
- Monarch: Frederick IV.

== Arts and literature ==
- Følling Church was built.
- Granvin Church was built.

== Births ==
- 10 April - Lucia Pytter, philanthropist (died 1825)

=== Full date unknown ===
- Hans Strøm, zoologist (died 1797).
