= 1724 in Norway =

- Centuries: 16th; 17th; 18th; 19th; 20th
- Decades: 1700s; 1710s; 1720s; 1730s; 1740s
- See also: 1724 in Denmark; List of years in Norway

Events in the year 1724 in Norway.

== Incumbents ==
- Monarch: Frederick IV.

== Events ==
- 23 June - The Hølonda Church burns down.

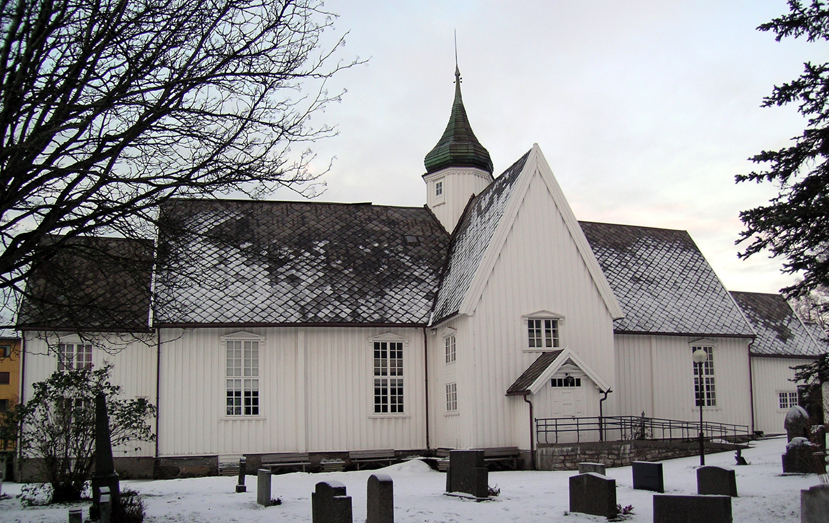
Mo Church

== Arts and literature ==
- Mo Church was built.
- Ludvig Holbergs comedy play «Julestuen» and other comedy plays is first published.

== Births ==
- 22 January - Ole Irgens, bishop (died 1803)
