= Brurskanken samiske kvindeforening =

Sami women's association

Brurskanken samiske kvindeforening (the Sami Women's Association of Brurskanken) or Brurskankens Lappkvindeforening, was a Sami women's organization, founded in Norway in 1910. It was founded by Sami women in Helgeland in Norway, and dissolved in 1931. It has been referred to as the start of the Sami women's movement.

== History ==
The purpose of the organization was to campaign for schools for Sami children in Nordland, and to benefit the education among the Sami people, both women and men. All Sami women over the age of fifteen could become members.

The organization was founded on the initiative of Elsa Laula Renberg, who became the first president. A few years later, the Brurskankens samiske kvindeforening initiated the first All Sami Conference in Trondheim in 1917, organized by Renberg as chair for a work group also composed of among others Ellen Olsen Toven, Anna Renfjell and Ellen Lie.

It was not the first Sami women's organization: in 1906, Elsa Laula Renberg's sister Maria Katarina Laula had founded the Fatmomakke- och Åsele Lappska kvinnoförening, but it had merely been a women's wing of the Lappernes Centralförbund. The Brurskanken samiske kvindeforening was the first independent Sami women's organization and has been called the starting point of the Sami women's movement.

Brurskankens Lappkvindeforening died with the death of Elsa Laula Renberg in 1931. After the dissolution, the Sami women's movement did not organize again until the foundation of the Sáráhkka (1988–2004).
