= 1725 in Norway =

- Centuries: 16th; 17th; 18th; 19th; 20th
- Decades: 1700s; 1710s; 1720s; 1730s; 1740s
- See also: 1725 in Denmark; List of years in Norway

Events in the year 1725 in Norway.

== Incumbents ==
- Monarch: Frederick IV.

== Events ==
- 8 March – The Dutch merchant ship Akerendam sinks near the island of Runde during its maiden voyage, the entire ship's crew of 200 people dies in the sinking.

== Arts and literature ==
- The construction of the Oslo Ladegård is complete.

== Births ==
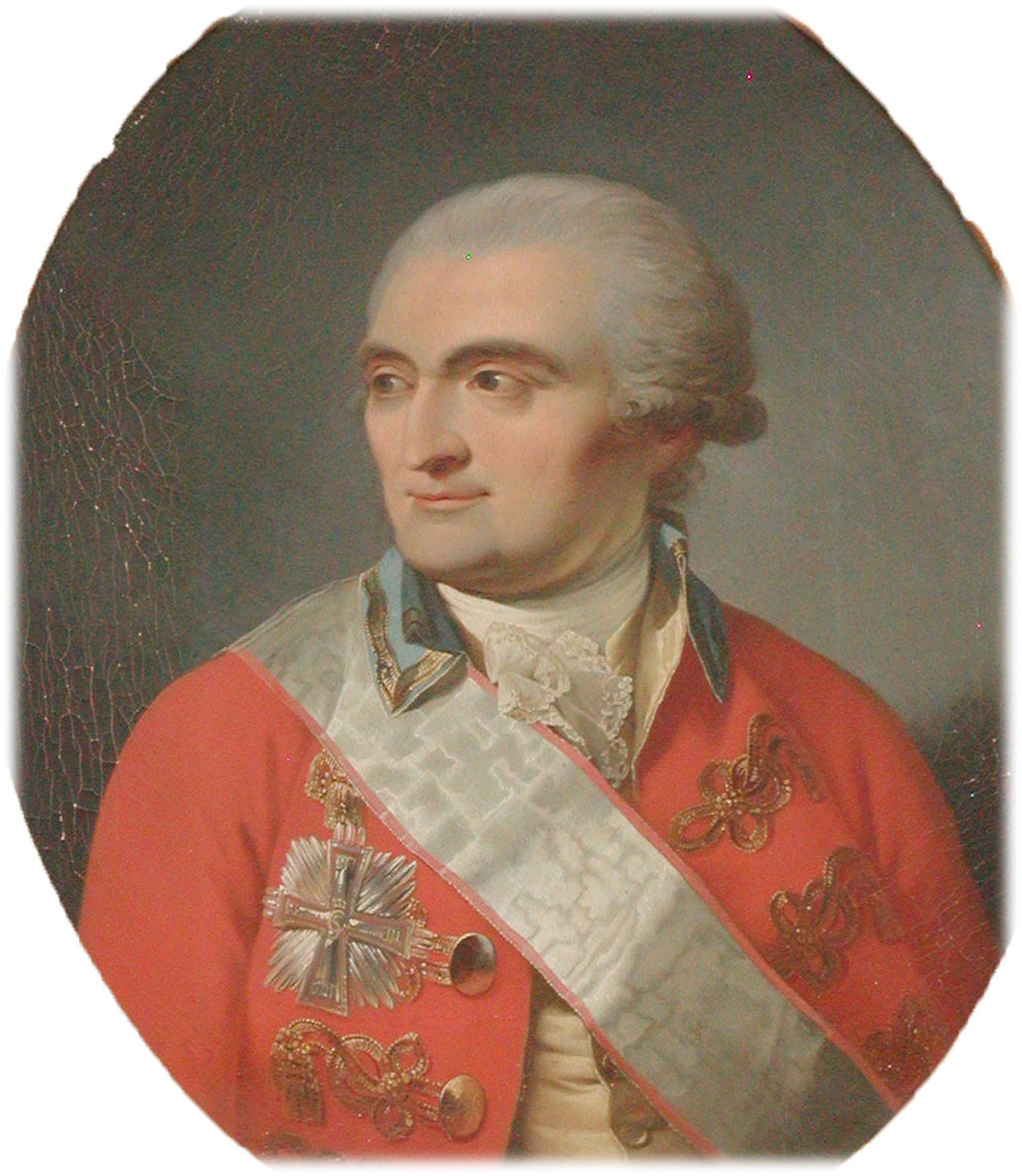
Johan Frederik Classen

- 11 February – Johan Frederik Classen, industrialist and philanthropist (died 1792).
- 8 March – Jens Boalth, educator (died 1780).
- 22 September – Gunder Gundersen Hammer, government official (died 1772).
- 19 November – Magnus Theiste, government official (died 1791)
