= Nils Engelhart =

Nils Engelhart (c. 1668–1719) was a Norwegian Lutheran priest.

Nils Engelhart was born in Meldal in Søndre Trondhjem county. His father Daniel Engelhart (c. 1638-1733) was the magistrate and later mining administrator. Løkken Mine was located in the same parish. He studied for the ministry in Copenhagen while serving in the Danish-Norwegian Navy. In 1693, he was assigned a personnel chaplain at Tingvoll Church in Romsdalen. Nils Engelhart had several priesthood assignments in Nordmøre and Romsdal in subsequently years.

Engelhart was an active participant of the pietist association Syvstjernen, along with his friend Thomas von Westen. The influence from Syvstjernen marked a beginning of the Pietism movement in Norway. Engelhart died in Veøy in 1719.

== See also ==
- Church of Norway
