= Sámi Assembly of 1917 =

First Sámi National Assembly

Participants at the first Sámi national assembly, photographed at the Methodist Church in Trondheim on 6 February 1917. Around 150 Sámi people gathered at the assembly from Norway and Sweden. 6 February has since become the Sámi National Day. Credit: Schrøderarkivet/Sverresborg

The Sámi Assembly of 1917 was the first Sámi National Assembly. The Sámi who took part in the assembly were from both Norway and Sweden. The meeting was held at the Methodist Church in Trondheim from 6 to 9 February 1917. The Sámi National Day is celebrated on 6 February to commemorate the beginning of this assembly. Around 150 participants gathered at the assembly, of which the majority consisted of Southern Sámi from Nordland, Trøndelag, and Hedmark counties.

Elsa Laula Renberg (1877–1931) from Helgeland and the Sámi Women's union at Brurskanken initiated the assembly. Renberg was the assembly's chairwoman and gave the opening speech at the meeting. The other major Sámi leader at that time, Daniel Mortenson from Røros/Elgå, was also a chairman and gave a lecture at the assembly about reindeer farming and how it had become hampered by the Joint Sámi Act ("Felleslappeloven") of 1883. The lecture sparked a debate that led to the forming of a separate committee concerning reindeer farming by the assembly. The committee later presented a proposal for a new reindeer farming act, which influenced the final shaping of the law in 1919. The other main issue at the assembly was the demand for a separate Sámi school, where children were taught and allowed to write in the Sámi language.

== Background ==
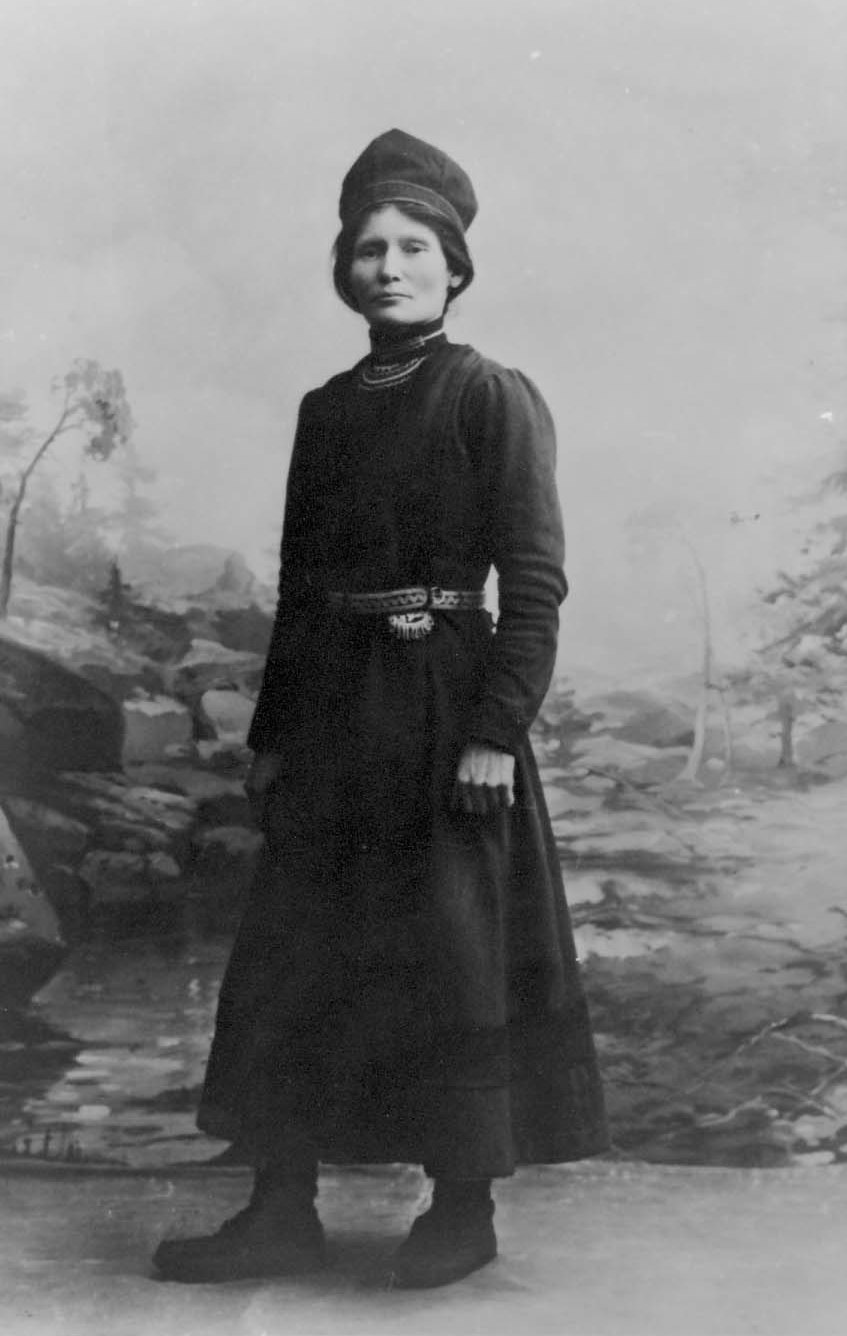
Elsa Laula Renberg (1877–1931) was a reindeer herder in the Brurskanken mountains south of Mosjøen. She was the assembly's initiator. The picture was probably taken in 1916 as part of the promotion for the assembly.

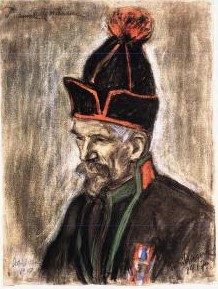
Daniel Mortenson from Elgå/f was one of the most active Sámi politicians at that time. He was a reindeer herder, edited the newspaper Waren Sardne, took part in establishing several Sámi organizations, and was elected as chairman for this assembly. Painting by Astri Aasen.

In the years preceding the assembly, Sámi people in both Norway and Sweden felt that their culture and livelihoods were threatened. Therefore, in the years 1904–1910, both Sámi organisations and journals started to arise.

=== Territory restrictions and Norwegianization ===
The Joint Sámi Act of 1883 was the first major attempt by the authorities to "gain control of the Sami's reindeer herding". The law applied to both Norway and Sweden, and established territories for reindeer grazing. The law introduced the principle of collective liability for all shareholders in the reindeer grazing territories for damages inflicted by the reindeer on the local agriculture. In 1894, the boundaries for reindeer grazing were established, yet important grazing areas such as Trollheimen and Gauldalsvidda fell outside these boundaries. With the Supplementary Sámi Act of 1897, landowners received the right to prohibit reindeer herding outside of the reindeer grazing territories. Prescriptive rights and common law were thus disregarded. However, the legal regulation of reindeer herding was in constant motion, and several commissions worked on the reindeer herding question up until the next reindeer herding act came in 1933.

In Sweden, the "limit of cultivation" had given Sámi nomads the right to use grazing land in the areas of the country that were situated above rural communities. These territories, however, were eventually adopted by new settlers, a process that has been characterized as "rural colonization", so that the reindeer herds were pushed away from the known grazing areas. The Sámi's liability for reindeer damages remained however.

Questions of territory and grazing rights were particularly a problem in the Southern Sámi areas. In the Northern Sámi areas of Troms and Finnmark, the biggest challenge was Norwegianization, within "schools, industries, the church, defense and intelligence - often in a close (and intimate) relation". The pressure was particularly directed at Sámi in "transitional districts" in coastal areas and remote fjords. A part of this was due to the school governor not wanting Sámi teachers to teach in Sámi villages where they could "be to the detriment of their Sámi knowledge"; they should therefore be sent to non-Sámi villages.

Outside of Namsos, the Sámi school in Havika had started in 1910 as a boarding school for children from Southern Sámi families; the school was in many ways a "Norwegianization school", but was also a meeting place for the Sámi. The Sámi missionary organisation was founded in 1888, and from the beginning, made a conscious effort to use the Sámi language. After national assembly resolutions in 1912 and 1913, the organisation adopted into its bylaws that "the organisation should in no respect be in violation of the State's work concerning the church and schooling". This was interpreted as supporting the Norwegianization effort.

In Sweden, the authorities, through a school reform in 1913, had split Sámi children into two groups, the so-called "category splitting": children of reindeer herding Sámi went to "the Nomad school", whilst children of non-nomadic Sámi went to regular schools, where they lost their Sámi identity. This was called "Lapps should be Lapps" politics, where "real Sámi" were defined in a way that ostracized large groups of Sámi.

The question of reindeer herding across the border between Norway and Sweden had been a difficult topic during the Karlstad Convention. From ancient times, the Sami reindeer herders placed little emphasis on national borders, and had let their reindeer graze in Sweden during the winter and in Norway during the summer. Through the Lapp Codicil of 1751, this tradition was regulated by contract between the countries. Eventually, as a majority of these Sami became Swedish citizens, grazing and reindeer herding rights from Sweden became a burden for Norway. During the negotiations of 1905, it was thought this cross-border reindeer herding included 80,000-100,000 Swedish reindeer in Troms and Nordland, and in comparison there were only 7000 Norwegian reindeer grazing in Sweden during the winter. During the Karlstad Convention, this was finally resolved so that Norway accepted the grazing rights from Sweden, but was curtailed so that reindeer migration had to occur after June 15, six weeks later than previous regulations.

== Lectures and discussions at the assembly ==
There were four key issues on the assembly schedule: reindeer grazing, legislation, schooling, and organisation issues. In addition, there was a lecture on tuberculosis, a slide show lecture by reindeer herding officer Kristian Nissen about "Sami and reindeer in Norway", and a historical lecture by "Headmaster Prytz" about the Røros Sámi, emphasising the assault on the Sámi at Dalbusjøen in 1811.

The programme also included a civic reception, a dinner at the Trade Association, theatre visits, and a tour of the cathedral.

The assembly was conducted in Norwegian, partly due to Norwegian-speaking guests, and partly due to the difference between the Northern Sámi and Southern Sámi languages. Johan Roska apologised during the discussions that one could not use their own language at the assembly.

=== The question of reindeer herding ===
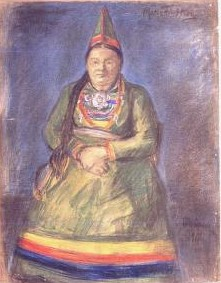
Marie Finnskog from Røros Municipality was emissary and took part in the assemblies of both 1917 and 1921. During the discussion on the Joint Sámi Act, she gave a longer contribution where she said that "the right to own land and grazing territories belonged to the Sámi, who were in fact the country's first settlers". Painting by Astri Aasen.

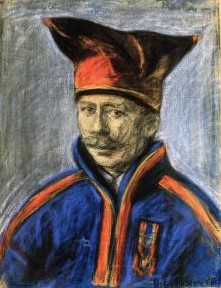
Johan Roska from Nesseby Municipality. Roska advocated that a Sámi newspaper should be started. Painting by Astri Aasen.

Mortenson held the lecture on reindeer herding. The topic was discussed in relation to the "domestic relationships" and the "international (Norway/Sweden) relationships". The discussion on domestic relationships concerned first and foremost the loss of grazing land as a result of the farming of new land and other expansions in agriculture. Furthermore, grazing damages and compensation procedures for this were discussed, in addition to the distrust between the Sámi and the farmers/villagers. Mortenson argued for a more business-orientated meat production in reindeer herding, with larger herds of reindeer. Renberg disagreed; she "maintained that the key condition is rational herding, whether it is about milking or producing meat". "Allow those Sami who want to produce meat to do so, but also allow us with herds of approx. 100 reindeer the right to live according to the old Sami way of life". Mortenson was also concerned about a recent Supreme Court ruling on grazing rights and compensation in Røros that had gone against the Sámi there.

The international relationships concerned the question of grazing across the border between Sweden and Norway.

The assembly agreed to a resolution where it was requested that the common law of free grazing would be maintained, and that the State had to buy or expropriate new grazing land to substitute grazing land that was now built upon. Changes in the rules concerning compensation for grazing damages caused by reindeer were demanded. They also wanted to changes to the rules regarding the sale of unmarked reindeer; such that the profits from this in the future could go to common Sámi causes.

Lawyer Ole Tobias Olsen jr. from Mosjøen also attended the assembly and was active in the discussions about herding laws, in addition to that, he was one of the keynote speakers on the topic "legislation". Olsen had worked together with Renberg earlier, and was chosen as legal consultant to the committee that would work on the question of reindeer herding further. The others on the committee were Thomas Renberg (Elsa Laula Renberg's husband) and Nils Kappfjeld from Helgeland, Nils Andersen Nursfjeld and Per Larsen Jomafjeld from Nord-Trøndelag, and Johan Barrok and Mortenson from Sør-Trøndelag. This committee met again in Mosjøen a few weeks after the national assembly, and delivered in 1919, a separate proposal for a new reindeer herding law.

=== Legislation ===
Lawyer Olsen and the Swedish jurist Torkel Tomasson introduced the legal issues. Tomasson discussed the Joint Sámi Act and highlighted several instances that "did not form a harmonious relationship with the Sami's interests"; he also said that the internal agricultural colonization "had deprived the Sami one right after another". He also criticised the provisions that regulated reindeer migration between Sweden and Norway, and thought that these were both contrary to the nature of the reindeer and common law.

Olsen discussed the rules concerning compensation for grazing damages caused by reindeer; the current practice was often that the damages were assessed with prejudice by the affected farmer's neighbours and friends. The same farmers and their friends also sat in on the full bench trial, thought Olsen. In the discussion after these lectures, the damages inflicted on reindeer by the villagers' stray dogs was also cited.

The discussion on herding and legislation were closely linked, and took up most of the time at the assembly. The resolutions dealt with these issues together.

=== Organisation issues ===
To initiate the establishment of a Sámi organisation, Martin Tranmæl, former editor of the Trondheim newspaper Ny Tid, had been invited to the assembly. He recommended a structure with regional associations, municipal associations, and a nationwide association or a Scandinavian union.

Johan Roska from Nesseby advocated that a Sámi newspaper should be started. He thought that it should be published in Norwegian, whilst Gunnar Johnsen Vesterfjeld from Helgeland thought that such a newspaper could be written in both Norwegian and Sámi.

The committee formed to draw up a proposal for a new reindeer herding law were also asked to consider the organisation issue.

=== Schooling ===
A high priority during the assembly was the demand for a separate Sámi school, and that children had to be taught in the Sámi language. The issue was introduced by a lecture from the Swedish Nomad School-inspector, Vitalis Karnell, who gave an account of the new school system in Sweden. However, the assembly felt that this solution was not relevant in Norway. The discussion was otherwise marked by criticism of the Sámi school in Havika, criticism that was concerned with both practical and principle questions.

After the common assembly was ended on Friday, and in line with the Friday discussions, a special meeting was held on Saturday 10 February concerning schooling.. Sanna Jonassen from Fosen/Namsos had initiated this meeting. The discussion concluded with a resolution that was attached to the minutes of the assembly. It was demanded that "the State should be obliged to provide Sámi education while retaining the Sámi language in the schools, with Sámi overseers and teaching of such subjects, which are necessary for the Sámi to know if they want to be able to exist as reindeer farmers". The resolution points out that this should be arranged in different ways in Southern Sámi and Northern Sámi regions, given that in Southern Sámi areas, the Sámi kept on settling down there. It was also felt that it was the State, and not the Sámi missionary organisation, that should have responsibility for education.

=== Two factions during the assembly ===
An impression that there were "two factions" during the assembly has attached itself to the meeting, an impression that was established in Adresse Newspaper's report from the assembly in the same week. Later historiography has alternated between minimizing this point, and highlighting it.

Mortenson and Renberg were regarded as leaders of each faction. The two had experiences of different forms of reindeer farming. In Røros, Mortenson had already in 1902 begun to shift from intensive reindeer herding nomadism to extensive meat production. Renberg's grazing district in Helgeland belonged to the part of Southern Sámi reindeer herders who were the last to give up the close nomadic life with the reindeer. Mortenson argued for a modernization of reindeer herding. "Thus, there were representatives of two different herding methods that met, with somewhat contrasting interests in relation to what they wanted to achieve with regard to the revision of the reindeer herding laws. Mortenson wanted reindeer husbandry to be integrated into Norwegian society and wanted a law that would fit accordingly. Renberg was deeply rooted in the traditional, nomadic reindeer herding and was keen to preserve Sámi values and traditions".

Mortenson was not concerned with Sámi education in schools either. Renberg had a starkly contrasting view. This view has been described as a "special demand" from Renberg's side, and a "general demand" from Mortenson's side. It was clear during the assembly that government representatives preferred general, unspecified demands. Nissen succeeded in rejecting a draft resolution from the two Finnmark Sámi on the grounds that it concerned "special interests".
