= Jens Schanche =

Norwegian civil servant (1717–1787)

- Born: 1717
- Died: 1787 (aged 69–70)
- Occupations: Postmaster and postal inspector

Jens Schanche (1717 – 1787) was a Norwegian postmaster and postal inspector. He contributed significantly to the development and reform of the Norwegian postal service (Posten Norge).

Schanche grew up at the trading post of Karstenøya on Ytter-Vikna in Nord-Trondelag, Norway. From 1742 he worked as a procurator in Trondheim. When the postmaster in the city was suspended in 1748, Schanche became acting postmaster. He visited Copenhagen in 1752 and put forward their ideas for postal reform in Norway. In 1758, Schanche's postal proposals were adopted virtually in their entirety. This resulted in the mail system in Norway undergoing its biggest change since the establishment of postal service in 1647. His plan was instrumental in the transition from postal transport being a duty imposed on farmers as mail carriers. The majority of postal farmers now received salaries and the rural sub-post office system is formalized.

As a reward for his efforts, Schanche was moved to the postmaster office in Christiania (now Oslo). Schanche was given the title post controller and conducted thorough checks in an effort to end fraud. In 1770, he received the title of Chancellor (Norwegian: kanselliråd). Schanche resigned from the postmaster office in Christiania in 1780, but continued as postal inspector with residence in Trondheim.
