= Louise Sahlgreen =

Danish opera singer (1818–1891)

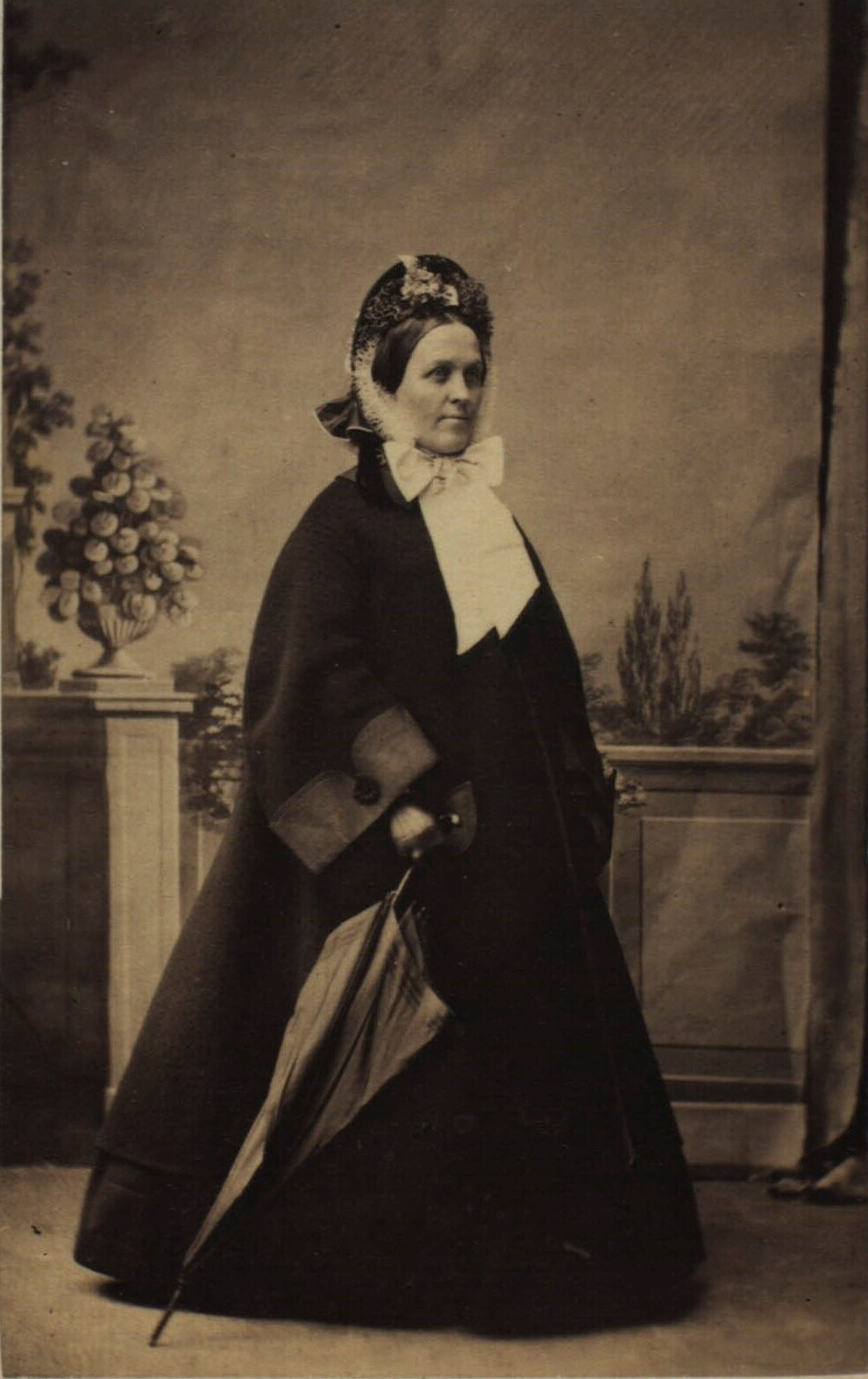
- Born: Louise Rudolfine Marcher; 17 September 1818; Copenhagen, Denmark
- Died: 15 August 1891 (aged 72); Copenhagen, Denmark
- Occupation: Actress
- Years active: 1830 — 1869
- Spouse: Ludvig Bernhard Sahlgreen
- Parent(s): Christian Clemens Marcher, Christiane Magdalene Cathrine Eleonora Rose

Louise Rudolfine Sahlgreen (née Marcher; 17 September 1818 – 15 August 1891) was a Danish operatic soprano. She was engaged by the Royal Danish Theatre in 1836, first as a member of the chorus but from 1842 as an opera singer. As a result of her plain looks, she did not reach prima donna status but nevertheless had a powerful soprano voice which extended to contralto, allowing her to perform a wide variety of roles. She was particularly successful as a soloist in the theatre's passion concerts in the Church of Our Lady where she sang every year from 1851 to 1869.

== Early life, family and education ==
Born on 17 September 1818 in Copenhagen, Louise Rudolfine Marcher was the daughter of the sea captain Christian Clemens Marcher (1773–1830) and his wife Christiane Magdalene Cathrine Eleonora Rose (1788–1868).

From 1830, Louise Marcher attended Giuseppe Siboni's music conservatory. In the 1840s, she continued her studies under the Italian conductor Paolo Sperati.

In April 1847, she married the prompter Ludvig Bernhard Sahlgreen (1816–1866).

== Career ==
In 1834, Marcher appeared in one of the conservatory's concerts and in 1836 was engaged by the Royal Theatre as a member of the chorus. In 1842, she successfully performed as a stand-in, taking the role of Jemmy in Rossini's William Tell. She went on to take other boy roles including the page in Meyerbeer's Les Huguenots and Cherubino in Mozart's The Marriage of Figaro. As a result, she was engaged by the company as a singer where she proved most successful taking on comic "madam" roles in operas such as Soler's La capricciosa corretta and C. E. F. Weyse's Et Eventyr i Rosenborg Have. Thanks to her wide-ranging voice, she was also able to perform dramatic roles such as Elvira in Mozart's Don Giovanni, Anna in Weber's Der Freischütz and the title role in Bellini's Norma.

Sahlgreen is also remembered for her concert performances. Every year from 1851 to 1869 she was a soloist in the passion concerts performed in the Church of Our Lady by members of the Royal Opera. After 1850, she was a soloist in works by composers such as Mendelssohn and Schumann at concerts conducted by Niels Gade. In 1854, she performed the role of the Elf King's Daughter when Gade's Elverskud was premiered at the Musikforeningen. She gave her last performance at the Musikforeningen in 1869.

== Death ==
Louise Sahlgreen died in Copenhagen on 15 August 1891 and was buried in Holmen Cemetery.
