= Thomas von Westen =

Norwegian Lutheran priest and missionary

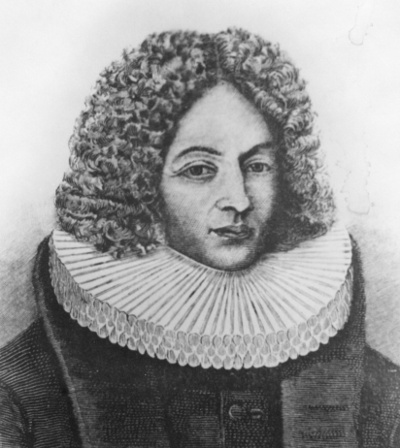

Personal details
- Born: 13 September 1682 Trondheim, Norway
- Died: 9 April 1727 (aged 44) Trondheim, Norway
- Denomination: Lutheran
- Parents: Arnoldus von Westen (1643-1698); Inger Marie Thomasdatter Meyer (1660-1715)
- Spouse: Anna Pedersdatter (ca. 1655–1746)
- Occupation: Priest
- Education: Cand.theol. in 1699
- Alma mater: University of Copenhagen

Thomas von Westen (13 September 1682 – 9 April 1727) was a Norwegian Lutheran priest and missionary. He was a driving force in the Sami mission, and founded the education institution Seminarium Scholasticum, the later Seminarium Lapponicum, in Trondheim.

== Personal life ==
Von Westen was born in Trondheim in Søndre Trondhjem, Norway. He was the son of Arnoldus von Westen (1643–1698) and his second wife, Inger Marie Thomasdatter Meyer. His father was a pharmacist at Løveapoteket Apothecary. His grandfather had been mayor of Trondheim.

== Career ==
Von Westen attended Trondheim Cathedral School and was educated for the priesthood at the University of Copenhagen where he took his Artium Baccalaureus degree in 1698. He received his Cand.theol. in 1699. After completing his education, he started working as a priest in Helgeland. In 1709, he was appointed vicar of Veøy Church in Romsdal.

Along with his friend and fellow priest Nils Engelhart, von Westen was an active participant of an association of priests which they named Syvstjernen. Established in 1713, Syvstjernen was an association of the seven priests in Romsdal. The group met regularly to establish mutual support and to advance the principals of Pietism (Norwegian: Pietismen).

He was also a pioneer of Christian mission among Sami people in Norway. He undertook three trips to northern Norway between 1716 and 1723. He also educated Sami boys to become teachers. During 1717, he founded a school at his home in Trondheim which he called "Seminarium domesticum". The school closed after Westen died in 1727; however, it served as a model for the later Seminarium Lapponicum which operated between 1752–1774.

== See also ==
- College of Missions
- Nærøy manuscript

== Other sources ==
- Sæter, Ivar (1926) Thomas von Westen (1926) Finnefolket sande ven, Læreren og videnskapsmanden (Oslo: Gyldendal)
- Grankvist, Rolf (2003) Seminarium Lapponicum Fredericianum i Trondheims-miljoet (Trondheim: DKNVS) ISBN 8251918987
