= Jens Kraft =

Norwegian mathematician (1720–1765)

Jens Kraft (2 October 1720 – 18 March 1765) was a Dano-Norwegian mathematician and philosopher. He was born in Frederikshald in Norway, but at age 5 he became an orphan and was subsequently raised by his uncle in Thy in Jutland. As a philosopher he introduced the study of ontology to Scandinavian academic circles.

He was influenced by Christian Wolff whilst still a student at Copenhagen, attending a lecture by Wolff while visiting Halle. He was appointed professor of philosophy at the Sorø Academy, where he responded to Baumgarten's Metaphsica with his own text metaphysik. Both divided their work into cosmologie, ontologie, psykologie and naturlig theologie.

Kraft made a distinction between time and eternity writing that "the finite can never obtain eternity, but it can obtain an infinite time, (Aevum) or a time with beginning but without end." The infinite by contrast has permanence (sempiternité)".
