= Samefolket =

Sámi news magazine in Sweden

- Editor: Åsa Lindstrand
- Frequency: Seven issues per year
- Publisher: Stiftelsen Samefolket
- Founded: 1918
- Country: Sweden
- Based in: Jåhkåmåhkke
- Language: Swedish, Norwegian, Sámi languages
- Website: www.samefolket.se
- ISSN: 0346-0320

Samefolket ('The Sámi People') is a Sámi news magazine published from Jåhkåmåhkke, Sweden. Its motto is "Den Samiska Kultur- och Samhällstidskriften" (The Sámi Culture and Society Magazine). Having published regularly since 1918, Samefolket is considered one of the oldest indigenous periodicals in the world.

== History ==
Samefolket was founded by Torkel Tomasson following the first national meeting of the Swedish Sámi, which was held in Östersund in 1918 on the heels of the pan-national Sámi Assembly of 1917. Tomasson called the new paper Samefolkets Egen Tidning ('The Sámi People's Newspaper'). In the first issue, Tomasson called for people to use the word "Sámi" instead of "Lapp," both as an expression of pride in the Sámi people and because of negative associations in Swedish with the word Lapp. Tomasson served as editor-in-chief of the paper until his death in 1940, publishing many articles on Sámi culture and identity.

In 1960, Samefolkets Egen Tidning was rebranded as Samefolket.

Samefolket mainly reports on cultural and political events in Sápmi, but it periodically also covers issues of importance to other indigenous peoples. The magazine publishes primarily in Swedish, but also contains stories in Norwegian and Sámi languages spoken in Sweden, primarily Northern, Lule, and Southern Sámi.

The magazine is owned by Stiftelsen Samefolket, which is co-funded by the Riksorganisationen Same Ätnam and Svenska Samernas Riksförbund.

=== Editors ===
- Torkel Tomasson: 1918–1940
- Gustav Park: 1940–1960
- Israel Ruong: 1969–1973
- Olle Andersson: 1974–1996
- Gustaf Jillker: 1996–2003
- Åsa Lindstrand: 2003
