= Seminarium Lapponicum =

18th-c. Norwegian educational institution

Seminarium Lapponicum was an educational institution established in Trondheim, Norway.

The mission of the school was to educate teachers and missionaries to teach Samis using their own Sami language. Seminarium Lapponicum was established in Trondheim by priest and missionary, Thomas von Westen in 1717. The school closed after Westen died in 1727. The seminar was re-established as the Seminarium lapponicum Fridericianumat at the Trondheim Cathedral School in 1752. It operated until it closed again in 1774 following the death of linguist and language researcher Knud Leem.

== Primary Source ==
- Grankvist, Rolf (2003) Seminarium Lapponicum Fredericianum i Trondheims-miljoet (Trondheim: DKNVS) ISBN 8251918987
