= Jacob von Thyboe =

1723 comic play by Ludvig Holberg

Jacob von Tyboe
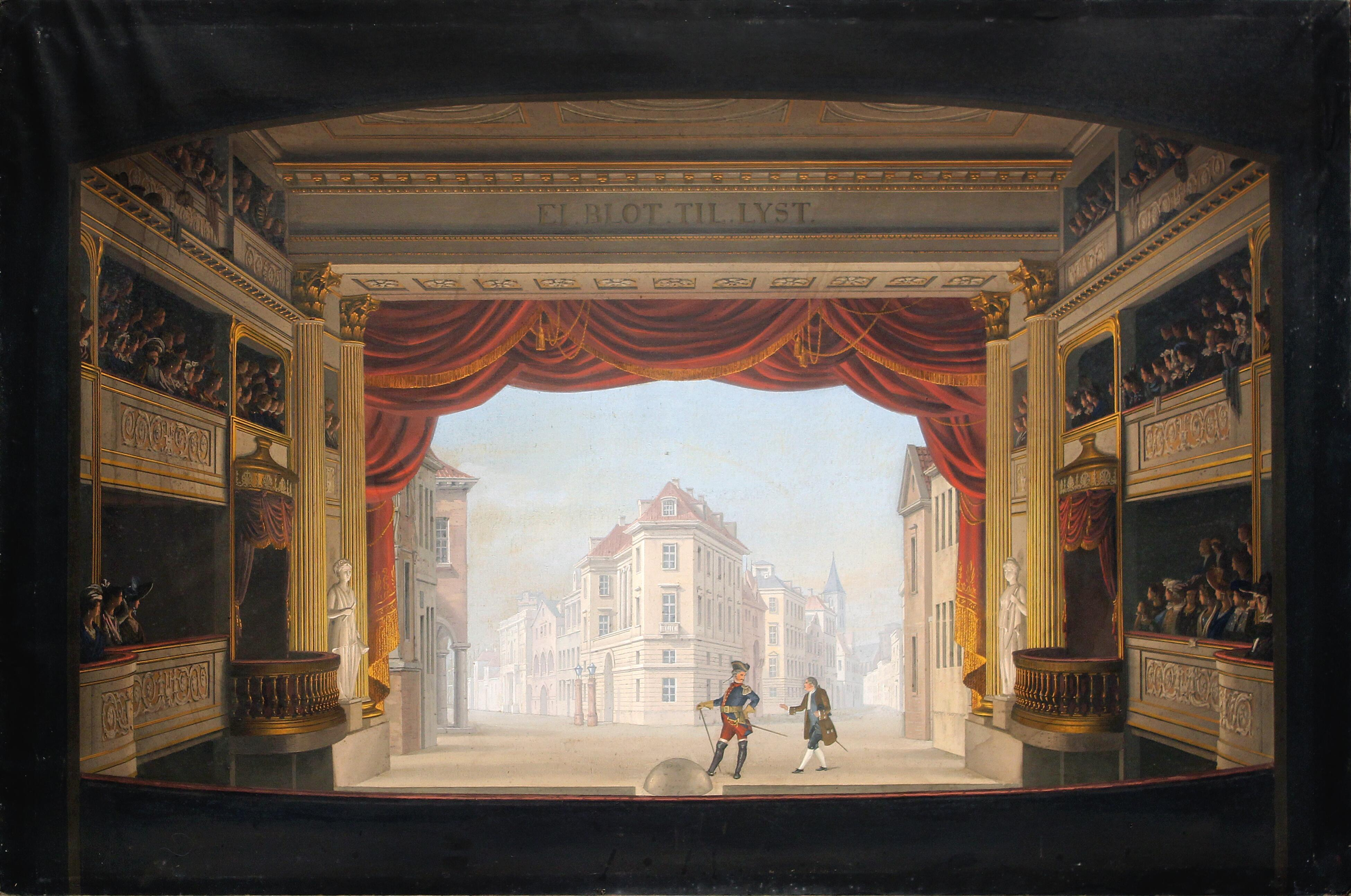
- A production of Jacob con Thyboe at the Royal Danish Theatre painted by Christian Ferdinand Christensen
- Written by: Ludvig Holberg
- Original language: Danish
- Genre: Comedy
- Setting: Denmark

Premiere
- Date premiered: 1725
- Place premiered: Lille Grønnegade Theatre, Copenhagen, Denmark

Jacob von T(h)yboe eller Den stortalende Soldat, or simply Jacob von Thyboe, is a satirical play first published by Ludvig Holberg in 1723. It premiered at the Lille Grønnegade Theatre in Copenhagen in 1725.

== Plot summary ==
Leonard is poor but wants to marry the fair Lucilia. His two rivals, Jakob von Thyboe, a soldier, and Styge Stygotius, are both wealthy and well-spoken.

== Adaptions ==
DR has produced a made-for-television movie of Jacob von Thyboe that premiered on 13 March 1966. It was directed by Ulf Stenbjørn and the cast included Aksel Erhardtsen, John Larsen, Eddie Karnil and Olaf Ussing.
