= Den vægelsindede =

1722 comic play by Ludvig Holberg

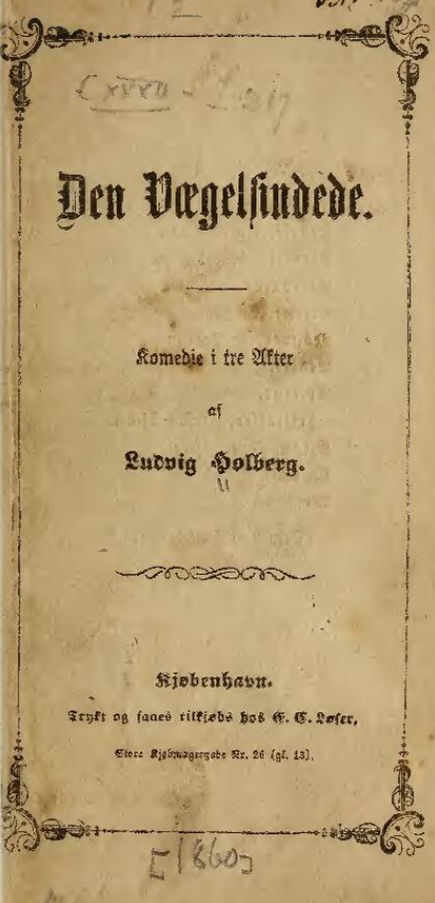
Cover of the play “Den Vægelsindede” (The Foolish One) (1723)

Den vægelsindede is a Danish play. The three-act comedy was written by Ludvig Holberg (1684–1754) and was published in 1722.

== English translations ==
- Holberg, Ludvig (1946). Four Plays by Holberg. Translated by Alexander, Henry. Princeton University Press for the American-Scandinavian Foundation. OCLC 1381528.
