= List of Holberg's plays in English translation =

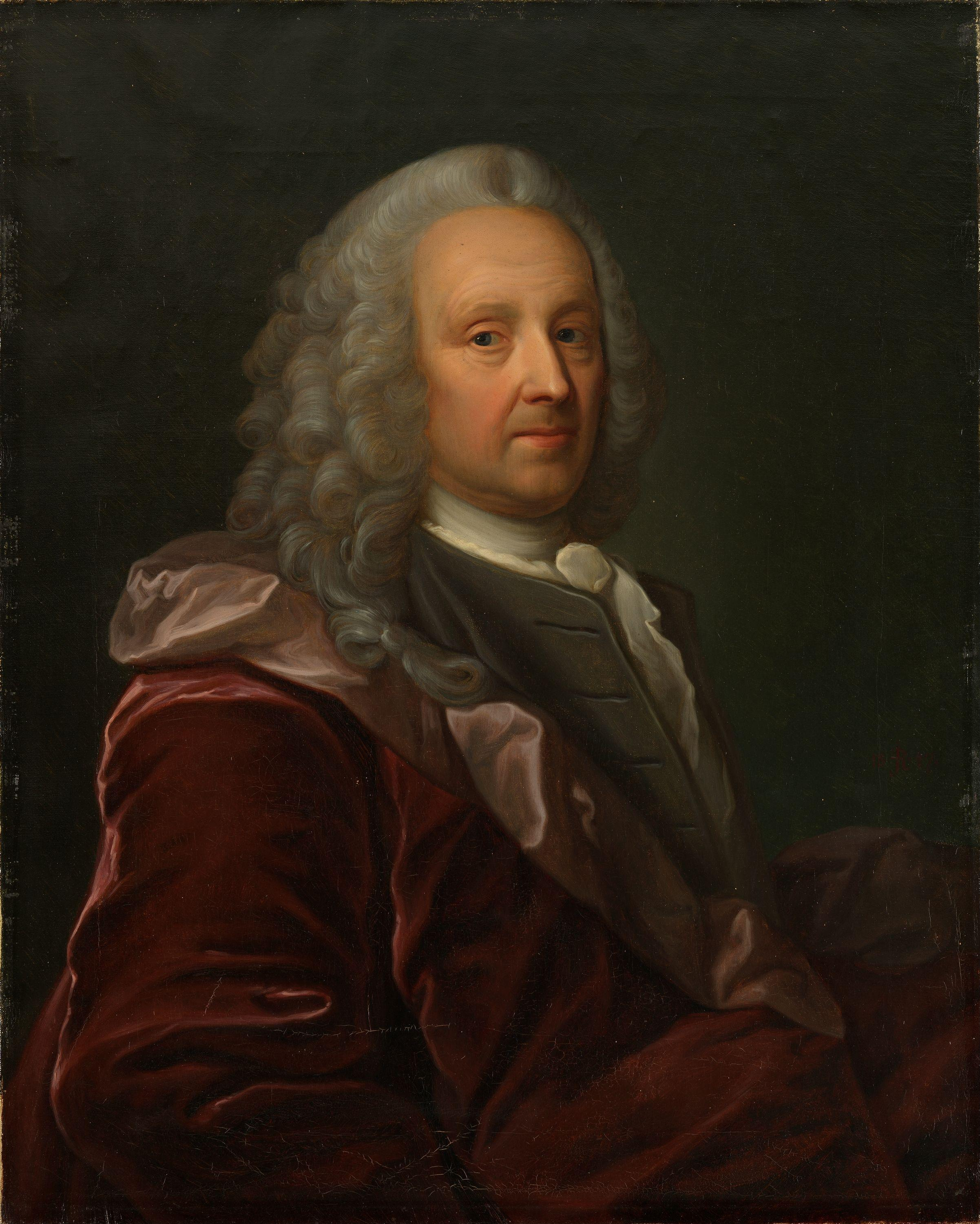
Ludvig Holberg

Ludvig Holberg, the "Molière of the North", wrote 33 Danish comedies between 1722 and 1753 — 15 of them ("the foundation for the entire Danish theatre") in a span of less than 18 months in 1722 and early 1723.

In his long career, nominally in education, Holberg produced works in philosophy, law, finance, and history; essays, satirical verse, biographies, memoirs, and an early science fiction utopia. However, his comedies have brought him the widest and most lasting acclaim. Despite this, no English translations of Holberg's comedies were made during his lifetime, and only 4 in the 19th century. In the 20th century many translations appeared (including 14 published by The American-Scandinavian Foundation). Now at least 39 English translations are available representing 20 of Holberg's 33 comedies. Jeppe on the Hill — his "most popular and most discussed play" — is also the most frequently translated, followed by Erasmus Montanus.

== Translations ==
=== Key ===
- Danish Title — The original play that serves as the basis of the English text.
- English Title — The title of the English text, as it appears in the given translation. Because one Danish title may be published under various English titles, sorting by this column is not a reliable way to group all translations of a particular original together; to do so, sort on Danish Title.
- Year — The year of the translation's first publication. Some translations may have been written or produced earlier than this date, and some have been republished subsequently, but this is not noted here.
- Publication — The publication in which the translation first appeared. These short titles are linked to their full bibliographic entries.

=== Table ===
Danish Title	English Title	Year	Translator	Publication	Notes
Mester Gert Westphaler	The Babbling Barber	1827	M. Corbett	The Odd Volume	1 act; reduced by Holberg himself from its original 5 acts.
Erasmus Montanus eller Rasmus Berg	Erasmus Montanus	1871	Peter Toft	Fraser's Magazine	5 acts.
Erasmus Montanus eller Rasmus Berg	Erasmus Montanus, or Rasmus Berg	1885	T. Weber	Erasmus Montanus, or Rasmus Berg	5 acts.
Den Politiske Kandestøber	The Blue-apron Statesman	1885	T. Weber	The Blue-apron Statesman	5 acts.
Jeppe på bjerget eller den forvandlede Bonde	Jeppe on the Hill, or The Transformed Peasant	1906	Waldemar Westergaard & Martin B. Ruud	Jeppe of the Hill	5 acts.
Den Stundesløse	Scatterbrains	1912	H. W. L. Hime	Three Comedies	3 acts.
Diderich Menschenskraek	Captain Bombastes Thunderton	1912	H. W. L. Hime	Three Comedies	1 act. Translated as 3 acts.
Henrich og Pernille	Henry and Pernilla	1912	H. W. L. Hime	Three Comedies	3 acts.
Den Politiske Kandestøber	The Political Tinker	1914	Oscar James Campbell & Frederick Schenck	Comedies	5 acts.
Jeppe på bjerget eller den forvandlede Bonde	Jeppe of the Hill	1914	Oscar James Campbell & Frederick Schenck	Comedies	5 acts.
Erasmus Montanus eller Rasmus Berg	Erasmus Montanus	1914	Oscar James Campbell & Frederick Schenck	Comedies	5 acts.
Jeppe på bjerget eller den forvandlede Bonde	Jeppe of the Hill	1933	M. Jagendorf	World Drama	5 acts.
Den vægelsindede	The Weathercock	1946	Henry Alexander	Four Plays	3 acts.
Den Stundesløse	The Fussy Man	1946	Henry Alexander	Four Plays	3 acts.
Mascarade	Masquerades	1946	Henry Alexander	Four Plays	3 acts.
De Usynlige	The Masked Ladies	1946	Henry Alexander	Four Plays	3 acts.
Mester Gert Westphaler	The Talkative Barber	1950	Henry Alexander	Seven One-act Plays	1 act; reduced by Holberg himself from its original 5 acts.
Det Arabiske Pulver	The Arabian Powder	1950	Henry Alexander	Seven One-act Plays	1 act.
Julestuen	The Christmas Party	1950	Henry Alexander	Seven One-act Plays	1 act.
Diderich Menschenskraek	Diderich the Terrible	1950	Henry Alexander	Seven One-act Plays	1 act.
Den pantsatte Bondedreng	The Peasant in Pawn	1950	Henry Alexander	Seven One-act Plays	3 acts. Translated as 1 act.
Den Forvandlede Brudgom	The Changed Bridegroom	1950	Henry Alexander	Seven One-act Plays	1 act.
Sganarels Rejse til det philosophiske Land	Sganarel's Journey to the Land of the Philosophers	1950	Henry Alexander	Seven One-act Plays	1 act.
Jeppe på bjerget eller den forvandlede Bonde	The Transformed Peasant	1957	Reginald Spink	Three Comedies	5 acts. Translated as 3 acts.
Det Arabiske Pulver	The Arabian Powder	1957	Reginald Spink	Three Comedies	1 act.
Kildereisen	The Healing Spring	1957	Reginald Spink	Three Comedies	3 acts. Translated as a prologue & 1 act.
Erasmus Montanus eller Rasmus Berg	Erasmus Montanus	1989	Petter Næss	Erasmus Montanus	5 acts.
Den Politiske Kandestøber	The Political Tinker	1990	Gerald S. Argetsinger & Sven Hakon Rossel	Jeppe of the Hill and Other Comedies	5 acts.
Jean de France eller Hans Frandsen	Jean de France; or, Hans Frandsen	1990	Gerald S. Argetsinger & Sven Hakon Rossel	Jeppe of the Hill and Other Comedies	5 acts.
Jeppe på bjerget eller den forvandlede Bonde	Jeppe of the Hill; or, The Transformed Peasant	1990	Gerald S. Argetsinger & Sven Hakon Rossel	Jeppe of the Hill and Other Comedies	5 acts.
Ulysses von Ithacia	Ulysses von Ithacia; or, A German Comedy	1990	Gerald S. Argetsinger & Sven Hakon Rossel	Jeppe of the Hill and Other Comedies	5 acts.
Erasmus Montanus eller Rasmus Berg	Erasmus Montanus; or, Rasmus Berg	1990	Gerald S. Argetsinger & Sven Hakon Rossel	Jeppe of the Hill and Other Comedies	5 acts.
Julestuen	The Christmas Party	1990	Gerald S. Argetsinger & Sven Hakon Rossel	Jeppe of the Hill and Other Comedies	1 act.
Pernilles korte Frøkenstand	Pernille's Brief Experience as a Lady	1990	Gerald S. Argetsinger & Sven Hakon Rossel	Jeppe of the Hill and Other Comedies	3 acts.
Den Danske Comoedies Liigbegængelse	The Burial of Danish Comedy, with Thalia's Farewell Speech	1990	Gerald S. Argetsinger & Sven Hakon Rossel	Jeppe of the Hill and Other Comedies	1 act.
Jeppe på bjerget eller den forvandlede Bonde	Jeppe of the Hill	1999	Michael Leverson Meyer	Three Danish Comedies	5 acts.
Den Stundesløse	The Scatterbrain	1999	Michael Leverson Meyer	Three Danish Comedies	3 acts.
Jeppe på bjerget eller den forvandlede Bonde	Jeppe of the Hill	2020	Bent Holm & Gaye Kynoch	Plays: 1	5 acts.
Ulysses von Ithacia	Ulysses von Ithacia	2020	Bent Holm & Gaye Kynoch	Plays: 1	5 acts.
Erasmus Montanus eller Rasmus Berg	Erasmus Montanus	2022	Bent Holm & Gaye Kynoch	Plays: 2	5 acts.
Hekseri eller Blind alarm	Witchcraft, or False Alarm	2022	Bent Holm & Gaye Kynoch	Plays: 2	5 acts.

== English translations ==
=== Drama collections ===
- Three Comedies. Translated by Hime, H(enry) W(illiam) L(ovett). London: Longmans, Green and Co. 1912. OCLC 6079882.
- Comedies by Holberg: Jeppe of the hill, The Political Tinker, Erasmus Montanus. Translated by Campbell, Oscar James; Schenck, Frederick. New York: The American-Scandinavian Foundation. 1914. OCLC 477029781.
- Four Plays by Holberg. Translated by Alexander, Henry. Princeton University Press for the American-Scandinavian Foundation. 1946. OCLC 1381528.
- Seven One-act Plays. Translated by Alexander, Henry. Princeton University Press for the American-Scandinavian Foundation. 1950. OCLC 1612009.
- Three Comedies: The Transformed Peasant, The Arabian Powder, The Healing Spring. Translated by Spink, Reginald. London: William Heinemann. 1957. OCLC 1153458237.
- Jeppe of the Hill and Other Comedies. Translated by Argetsinger, Gerald S.; Rossel, Sven Hakon. Carbondale: Southern Illinois University Press. 1990. ISBN 978-0-8093-1480-5. OCLC 1156867790.
- Three Danish Comedies. Translated by Meyer, Michael Leverson. London: Oberon Books. 1999. ISBN 9781840020601. OCLC 1098665264.
- Ludvig Holberg Plays. Volume I: Just Justesen's reflections on theatre, Jeppe of the hill, Ulysses von Ithacia. Translated by Holm, Bent; Kynoch, Gaye. Hollitzer. 2020. ISBN 9783990125953. OCLC 1155694802.
- Ludvig Holberg Plays. Volume II: Zille Hans-daughter's Gynaicologia, or Defence of Womankind; Erasmus Montanus; Witchcraft, or False Alarm. Translated by Holm, Bent; Kynoch, Gaye. Vienna: Hollitzer. 2022. ISBN 978-3990940334. OCLC 1355219148.

=== Individual dramas ===
- "The Babbling Barber: A Comedy in One Act". The Odd Volume: Second Series. Translated by Corbett, M. London: Longman, Rees, Orme, Brown, and Green. 1827. pp. 291–348. OCLC 11855940.
- "Erasmus Montanus: An Old Danish Comedy". Fraser's Magazine. 84. Translated by Toft, Peter. Longmans, Green, and Company: 69–96. 1871.
- Erasmus Montanus, or Rasmus Berg. Translated by Weber, T. Copenhagen: T. Weber's Academy. 1885a. OCLC 80046396.
- The Blue-apron Statesman. Translated by Weber, T. Copenhagen: E. Flensborg. 1885b. OCLC 19690501.
- Jeppe on the Hill; or, The Transformed Peasant; a comedy in five acts. Translated by Westergaard, Waldemar; Ruud, Martin B(ronn). Grand Forks, ND: The Evening Times Company. 1906.
- Clark, Barrett, ed. (1933). "Jeppe of the Hill". World Drama: Italy, Spain, France, Germany, Denmark, Russia, and Norway. Translated by Jagendorf, M. Dover. pp. 588–607. OCLC 26335417.
- Erasmus Montanus. Translated by Næss, Petter. Madison, WI: Dept. of Scandinavian Studies, University of Wisconsin. 1989. OCLC 20943193.

=== Other works ===
- A Journey to the World Under-ground. London: T. Astley. 1742. OCLC 3221932.
- Memoirs of Lewis Holberg. London: Hunt and Clarke. 1827. OCLC 561141606.
- Peder Paars. A verse translation of the original poem. Translated by Stromsoe, Bergliot. Lincoln: University of Nebraska Press. 1962. OCLC 644657.
