= Ane Grethe Antonsen =

Danish actress (1855–1930)

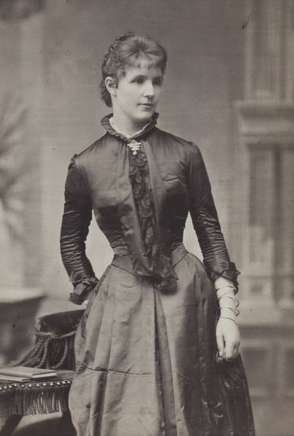
- Born: 25 June 1885; Juelsminde, Denmark
- Died: January 9, 1930 (aged 44); Copenhagen, Denmark
- Occupation: Actress
- Years active: 1879 — 1917
- Parent(s): Anton Rasmussen, Ellen Rasmusdatter

Ane Grethe Antonsen (1855–1930) was a Danish actress from Jutland. After training under Lauritz Eckardt, she made her debut in May 1880 at the Royal Danish Theatre as Ulrikka in Carsten Hauch's Søstrene paa Kinnekullen (The Sisters at Kinnekullen). She continued as a stage actress performing in the repertoire at the Royal Theatre for almost 30 years. In 1910, she turned to the cinema, acting in silent films, the first of which was Elskovsbarnet.

== Biography ==
Born on 25 June 1855 in Over Barrit near Juelsminde, Ane Grethe Antonsen was the daughter of the farmer Anton Rasmussen (1819–1894) and his wife Ellen Rasmusdatter (1821–1902). Despite little schooling, she moved to Copenhagen where she quickly became interested in the theatre. Making great efforts to lose her provincial accent, she was instructed by Lauritz Eckardt.

Antonsen made her debut at the Royal Theatre on 6 May 1880 as Ulkikka in Hauch's Søstrene paa Kinnekullen. After taking a number of tragic roles with limited success, she went on to perform solid, sometimes comic female roles such as Gina in Ibsen's Vildanden (1884), Kristine Linde in his Et Dukkehjem, and Ane, the confused maid, in Bjørnstjerne Bjørnson's Geografi og Kærlighed (1895). In more traditional repertoire roles, she played Gedske Klokkers in Holberg's Barselstuen and Madam Rar in Johan Ludvig Heiberg's Aprilsnarrene. In 1910, after playing Frk. Fenger in Hjalmar Bergstrøm's Dame-The, she retired from the Royal Theatre. The same year she performed in the silent films Elskovsbarnet and Et gensyn and later in Det falske spil (1911) and Pigen fra det mørke København (1912). Thereafter she made occasional appearances on the stage at the Dagmar Teatret and Folketeatret.

Ane Grethe Antonsen died in Sorø on 9 January 1930. As she had no heirs, she created a foundation for old performing artists.

== Filmography ==
- 1910 Elskovsbarnet as Vicomtens kone
- 1910 Et gensyn as Professorens hustru
- 1911 Dæmonen as Grevinde Frida von Falkenstein
- 1912 Pigen fra det mørke København

== Theatre roles ==
=== Royal Danish Theatre ===
- 1879 En skærsommernatsdrøm as Hippolita
- 1880 Søstrene paa Kinnekullen as Ulrikka
- 1882 En skærsommernatsdrøm as Hippolita
- 1884 Den stundesløse as Ane, kokkepige
- 1884 Den politiske kandestøber as Arianke Grovsmeds
- 1884 Hamlet as Dronningen
- 1884 Ulysses von Ithacia as Penelope, Ulysses gemalinde
- 1887 Hamlet as Dronningen
- 1887 Maskerade as Kone i maskeradeklæder
- 1888 Barselstuen as Gedske Klokkers
- 1888 Det lykkelige skibbrud as Frue
- 1888 Scapins skalkestykker as Nerine, Hyacinthes amme
- 1891 Hedda Gabler as Berte
- 1895 Lille Eyolf as Rottejomfruen
- 1900 Naar vi døde vaagner as Dikonisse
- 1901 Ulysses von Ithacia as Pallas
- 1903 Bygmester Solness as Aline Sollness
- 1904 Opstandelse as Matrøna
- 1908 Bygmester Solness Aline Solness

=== Aarhus Theatre ===
- 1917 Geografi og kærlighed as Malla
