= Anna Bloch =

Danish stage actress (1868-1953)

Anna Kirstine Bloch
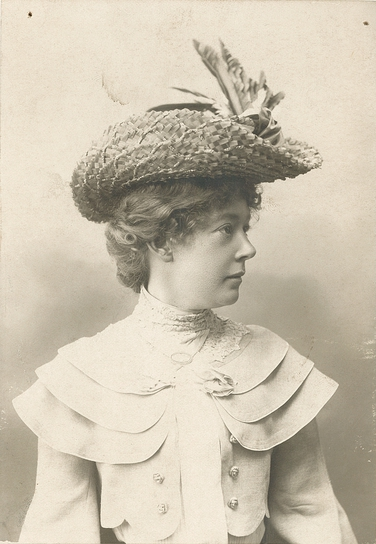
- Anna Bloch in 1904
- Born: Anna Kirstine Lindemann; 2 February 1868; Horsens, Jutland, Denmark
- Died: 25 November 1953 (aged 85); Copenhagen, Denmark
- Occupation: Actress
- Years active: 1885 — 1936
- Parent(s): Johan Sørensen Lindemann, Bodil Margrethe Gylding

Anna Kirstine Bloch (née Lindemann; 2 February 1868, in Horsens – 25 November 1953, in Copenhagen) was a Danish actress.

== Early life ==
Anna Lindemann's mother Bodil Margrethe Gylding (1838–1875) died when she was seven years old. Her father Johan Sørensen Lindemann (1825–1909) was a doctor in Horsens. She was taught privately, and consistently showed an enthusiasm for the theatre. Her father regarded acting as an unsuitable profession but eventually allowed her to join the Royal Danish Theatre after talking to its general director Edvard Fallesen.

== Career ==
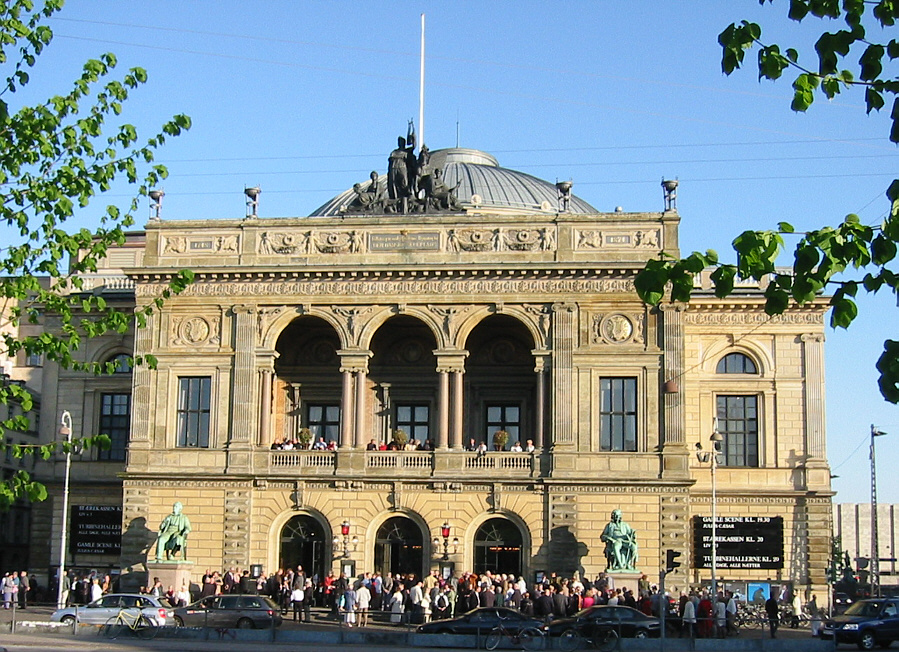
The Royal Theatre seen from Kongens Nytorv

At the Royal Theatre, Anna Lindemann was a student of Emil Poulsen and debuted in 1885 as Titania in William Shakespeare's A Midsummer Night's Dream. Between her first two roles she was taught by her husband to be, William Bloch. Together they wrote Miss Nelly in 1886, in which she later played the main role. After their marriage in Summer 1887, she took her husband's surname.

Anna Bloch's breakthrough came in 1888 as Trine in April Fools by Johan Ludvig Heiberg. Literary historian Peter Hansen credits her with the "phenomenal run of 31 performances" of this modernised revival of the 1826 original. Another early role was that of Hilde in Ibsen's The Lady from the Sea in 1889.

Bloch was awarded the Ingenio et arti gold medal in 1910. This was the 25th anniversary of her first role, and in a commentary for Politiken, Danish writer Emma Gad says that Bloch could make a normally insignificant role seem important to a play, as with the "brilliant and peculiar humour" of her portrayal of the "noble slut" (Adelstøs) Eugenia in Ludvig Holberg's Don Ranudo de Colibrados. For Gad, her most memorable performance was as the peasant girl Anjutha in Tolstoy's The Power of Darkness, where she was "gripped by a fear so wild" that "her mysterious horror ... rippled down to the auditorium and ran like a shudder from row to row."

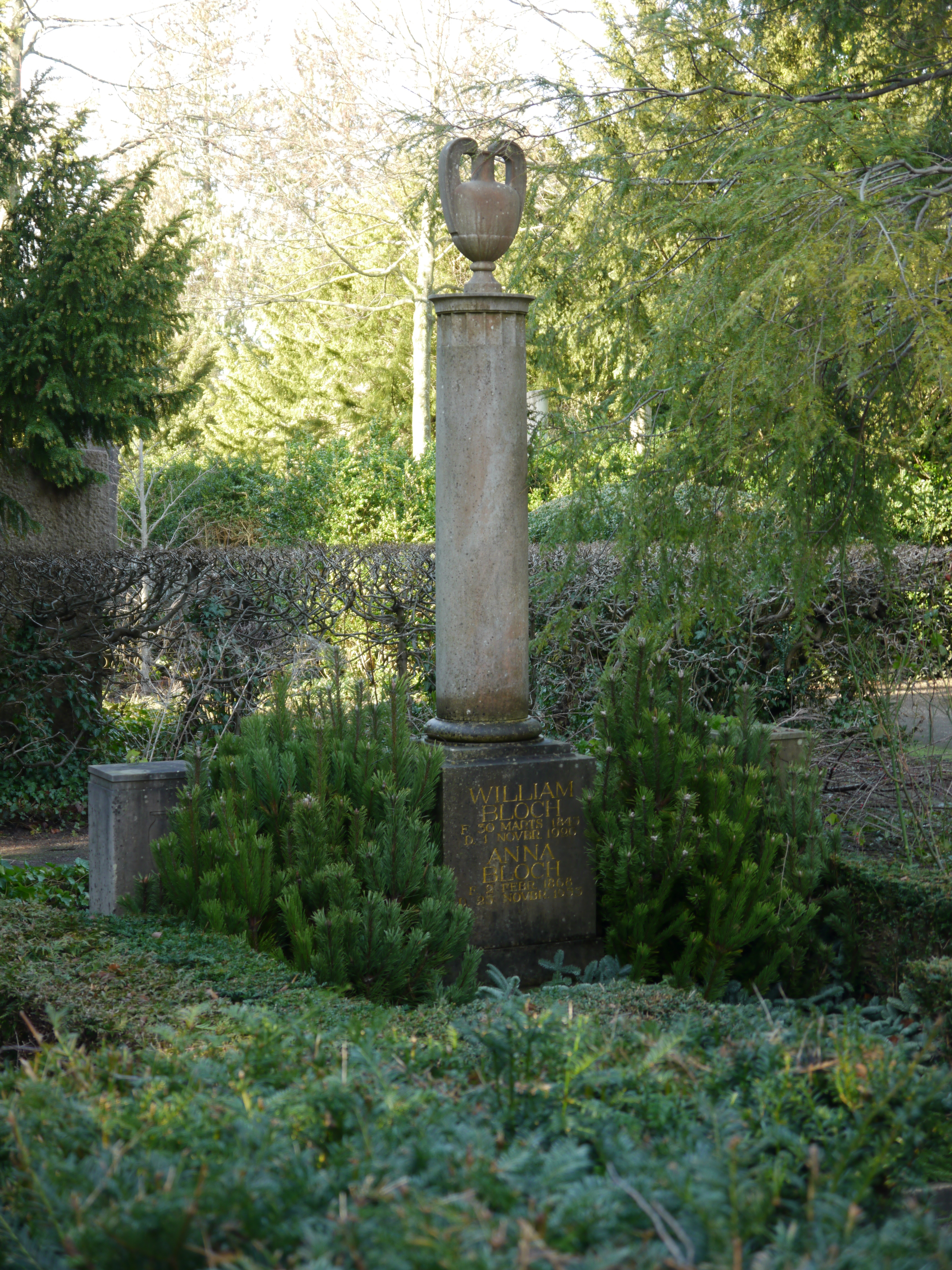
Anna Bloch's grave

Bloch left the Royal Theatre in 1918, although she returned for a season as guest actress and rejoined from 1922 to 1925. She found herself typecast as the young girl or woman, even playing the fourteen-year-old Hedevig in Ibsen's The Wild Duck in 1921 at the age of 53. Only really at home in 19th century theatre and unable to find suitable roles in the new era which began after the First World War, she was overtaken by the naturalism in theatre arts which she had helped pioneer. She did however tour the provinces, and appeared at the Betty Nansen Teatret. She can be heard in a scene from Jens Christian Hostrup's Genboerne (The neighbours across the road) recorded in 1938.

Danish literary critic Johannes Riis refers to Bloch as the Royal Theatre's "foremost naturalist actor" of the time. Although she never acted in films, she was, according to Riis, a role model for Danish actress Clara Pontoppidan.

She wrote a one-act comedy Saadan veksler (Such bills). The Royal Theatre presented this in 1923 with Bloch in the leading role and it was published in 1924. She also wrote two radio dramas, Epilog in 1934 and Veni, vidi, vici in 1935.

Anna Bloch is buried in Vestre Cemetery, Copenhagen.

== Roles ==
Anna Bloch's roles included:

=== Royal Danish Theatre ===
- 1885 En skærsommernatsdrøm as Titania
- 1885 Den bogstavelige udtydning as Jenny
- 1888 Barselstuen as Dorte Knapmagers
- 1888 Det lykkelige skibbrud as Young Girl
- 1891 Hedda Gabler as Thea Elvsted
- 1900 Recensenten og dyret as Rose, opvartningspige (waiting girl)
- 1901 Skærmydsler as Ellen
- 1904 Opstandelse as Fedosia
- 1905 Ole Lukøje as Poor Relative
- 1906 Helte as Raina, Petkoff's daughter
- 1909 Naar den ny vin blomstrer as Albert
- 1912 En søndag paa Amager as Lisbeth
- 1912 Indenfor murene as Esther
- 1913 Affæren as Amalie Busk
- 1914 Kærlighed og lykketræf as Silvia, Orgon's daughter
- 1915 Lottens forlovede as Emmy Tørning, writer
- 1916 Det levende lig as Anna Dmitrijenva Karenin
- 1916 Taarnet as Gertrud Funke
- 1921 Den kære familie as Ida, Friis' daughter
- 1923 Aprilsnarrene as Trine, Madam Rar's daughter
- 1923 Forældre, in various roles

=== Dagmar Theatre ===
- 1936 Dronningens mand as Dronning Martha (Queen Martha)

=== Hotelteatret ===
- 1914 Kærlighed og lykketræf as Silvia, Orgon's daughter

=== Odense Theatre ===
- 1918 Den vægelsindede as Lucretia

=== Aarhus Theatre ===
- 1906 Stor i skrøbelighed as Emma Jansen
- 1906 Aprilsnarrene as Trine
- 1918 Den kære familie as Emily
- 1918 Den vægelsindede as Lucretia

== Publications ==
- Bloch, Anna (1930). Fra en anden Tid, Erindringer [From Another Time, Memoirs] (in Danish). Copenhagen: Gyldendal. OCLC 468994427.
