= Nyhavn 5 =

Listed building in Copenhagen

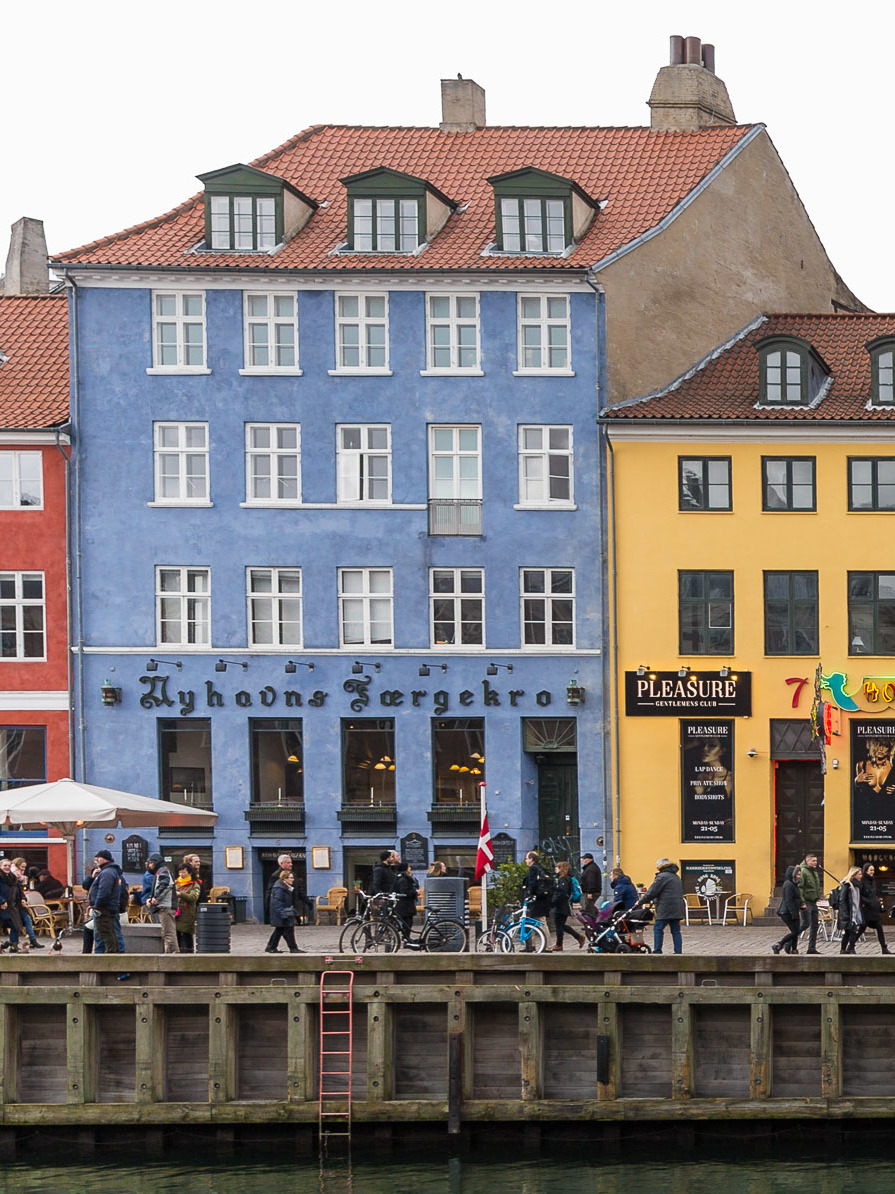
- Interactive map of the Nyhavn 5 area

General information
- Location: Copenhagen, Denmark, Denmark
- Coordinates: 55°40′50.63″N 12°35′17.95″E
- Completed: 18th century

Nyhavn 5 is an 18th-century property overlooking the Nyhavn canal in central Copenhagen, Denmark. It was listed in the Danish registry of protected buildings and places in 1945. Notable former residents include the actor Adam Gottlob Gielstrup, opera singer Peter Schram and businessman Cornelius Peter August Koch.

== Architecture ==
Nyhavn 5 is a four-storey building with a walk-out basement. Its five-bay-wide facade is plastered and painted in a light blue color, accentuated by a white-painted sill course beneath the first-floor windows and a continuous white sill course below the three central second-floor windows. The facade is crowned with a white-painted modillioned cornice. The main entrance is positioned in the easternmost bay.

The pitched red-tile roof features three dormer windows facing the street. At the rear, a side wing with the secondary staircase extends along the east side of an asymmetrically shaped courtyard and connects to a three-storey rear wing. The rear wing and the upper floors of the front wing, facing the courtyard, are constructed with timber framing, while the side wing is made of brick. All three wings are painted iron vitriol yellow on the courtyard-facing sides.
