= Christian Gotlob Mengel =

Danish publisher and translator

Christian Gotlob Mengel (23 October 1716 - 3 April 1769) was a German born Danish publisher, translator and bookseller.

== Early life and education ==
Mengel was born on 23 October 1716 in Schweidnitz, Silesia, the son of tailor Christian Friedrich M. and his wife, née Reinert. He came to Copenhagen in 1740 where he was employed by the industrious publisher and book printer Jacob Preuss. Preuss had just acquired the exclusive rights to the publication of Ludvig Holberg's Niels Klim and published it in both Latin, German, French and Danish.

== Career ==
When Preuss went bankrupt and fled the country in 1741, Mengel established himself as a publisher and bookseller at the corner of Købmagergade and Silkegade. He purchased the rights to Holberg's books from Preuss' creditors and published extended versions of Niels Klim in Latin (1745), German and Danish. He presented Holberg with the idea of a German-language issue of the entire Danske Skueplads. He got hold of a copy of Don Ranudo, which Holberg had completed back in 1723 but not dared to publish for fear that it would be perceived as a satire on the Danish nobility. He even obtained permission to include Don Ranudo, which Holberg had completed back in 1723 but not dared to publish, as long as he promised not to publish it independently and especially not in Danish. Mengel's plans for the German-language edition failed when J. C. Rothe beat him to it. Mengel ended up publishing Don Ranudo, in German as well as Danish, in 1745, claiming to be legally entitled to do so, having paid A. G. Coldeweg 10 Danish rigsdaler for a copy of a German translation of the otherwise lost comedy. Holberg took revenge by granting Ernst Heinrich Berling, his publisher since 1742, the exclusive rights to a new, revised translation into Danish. Mengel subsequently lost a lawsuit against Berling and was fined 5 Danish rigsdaler.

In the 1740s and 1750s, Mengel played a central role in introducing foreign literature to a Danish audience. The rights to these works were typically acquired at the book fairs in Leipzig and Frankfurt in return for Mengel's own translations of Danish works into German by authors such as Holberg, F. C. Eilschov, Erik Pontoppidan, A. de la Beaumelle, Ove Høegh-Guldberg and Frederik C. and O.D.L. Lütken.

Mengel opened a branch in Aalborg. He married the translator Engel Margrethe Thodbjerg in 1749 and she assisted him with the translations. After her death from tuberculosis in 1762, he lost interest in his business. He spent his last years cataloging book collections. He died in relative poverty on 3 April 1769 in Copenhagen.
