= Cathrine Marie Gielstrup =

Danish stage actress (1755–1792)

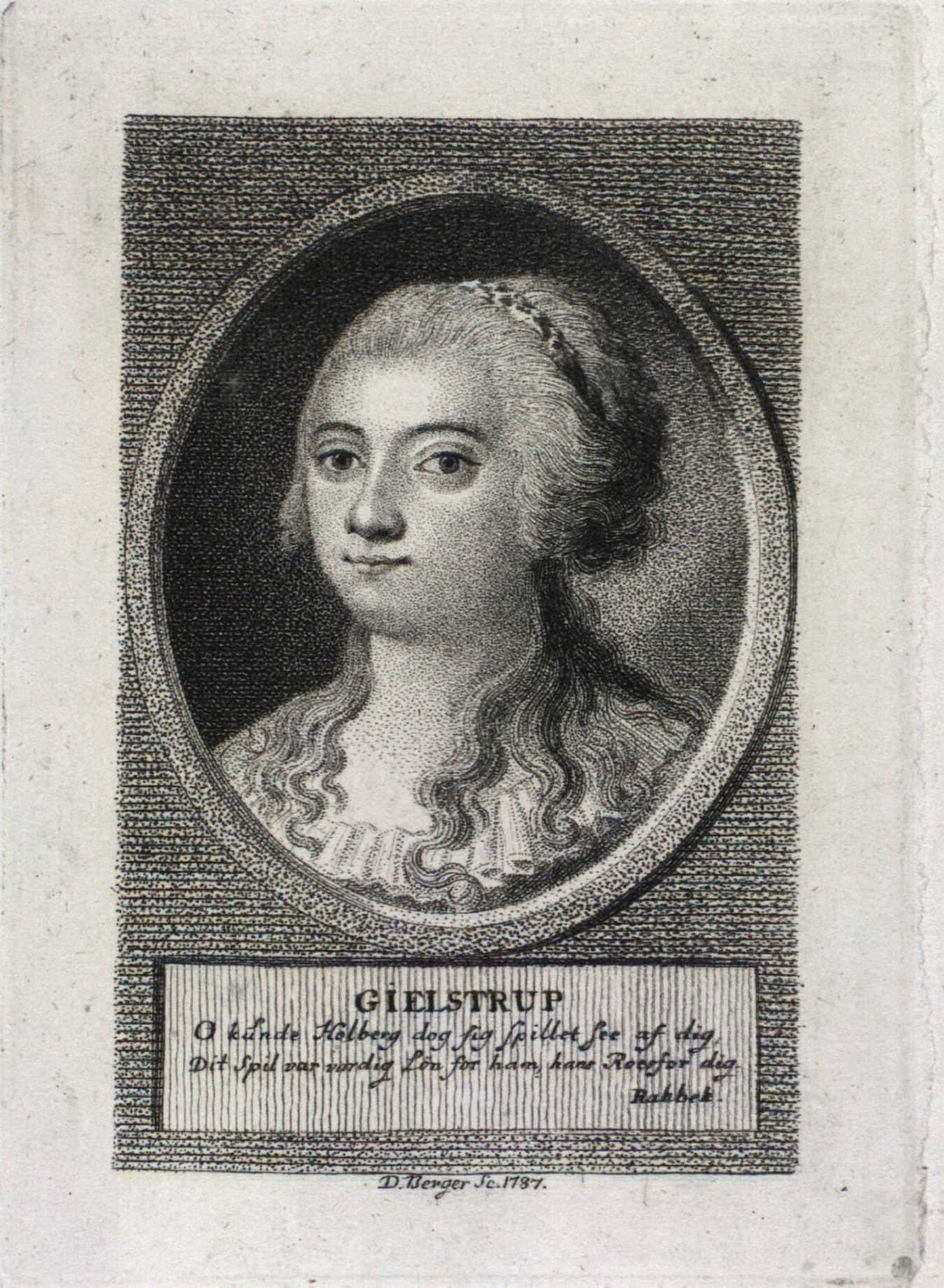
Cathrine Marie Gielstrup

Cathrine Marie Gielstrup née Morell (3 March 1755 – 29 October 1792) was a Danish stage actress. She was active at the Royal Danish Theatre in 1773–1792, and a member of the Det Dramatiske Selskab in 1777-79.

She was the daughter of the musician Lorentz Morell of the Royal Chapell orchestra. She is counted as among the elite of her profession at the time, famed for her soubrette roles, particularly within the plays of Holberg. She was praised for her ability to insert individuality and personality to even the most stereotypical roles. She married the actor Adam Gottlob Gielstrup.

== List of roles ==
=== Comediehuset ===
- 1773 Crispin lakaj og doktor as Lise, tjenestepige
- 1773 Den fortrolige moder as Lisette
- 1773 Den gifte Filosof as Finette, Melites pige
- 1773 Den honnette as Ambition Pernille
- 1773 Den sansesløse as Lisette
- 1773 Det tredobbelte giftermaal as Pernille, Leonoras pige
- 1773 Modens sæder as En pige
- 1773 Mændenes skole as Lisette, Leonores pige
- 1773 Sicilianeren as Climene, Adrastes søster / Musikant
- 1774 Cavaleren efter moden as Lisette
- 1774 Coquetten og den forstilte kyskhed as Marton, Cydalises kammerpige
- 1774 De fortrædelige hændelser as Frosine
- 1774 De pæne piger as Antoinette
- 1774 De to gerrige as Lise, husjomfru hos Knapskær
- 1774 Den alt for lønlige bejler as Pernille, Leonores kammerpige
- 1774 Den listige enke as Marionette, kammerpige hos Rosaura
- 1774 Den politiske kandestøber as Raadsherreinde
- 1774 Den prøvede troskab as Signe
- 1774 Den uformodentlige hjemkomst as Pernille
- 1774 Den ærgerrige as Hyacinte, kammerpige hos Donna Beatrix
- 1774 Det tvungne giftermaal as To Taterkoner
- 1774 Menechmi as Finette, Aramintes kammerpige
- 1774 Skotlænderinden as Polly, Lindanes kammerpige

=== Royal Danish Theatre ===
- 1775 De nysgerrige fruentimre Lisette, pige hos Olivia og Julie
- 1775 Den kokette enke as Spinette
- 1775 Henrik og Pernille as Pernille, Leonoras pige
- 1776 Vennen af huset as Orfise, moder til Agathe
- 1777 Aglae as Glycerie
- 1777 Democritus as Cleanthis, Isemenes kammerpige
- 1777 Den kærlige forbitrelse as Marine, Lucias kammerpige
- 1777 Den straffede gjæk as Justine, fru Clorinvilles kammertjene* r
- 1777 Det uventede møde as Balkis, opvarterske
- 1777 Menechmi as Finette, Aramintes kammerpige
- 1777 Sammensyeren as Lisette
- 1778 Barselstuen as Første pige hos Corfitz / Stine Isenkræmmers
- 1778 Coquetten og den forstilte kyskhed as Marton, Cydalises kammerpige
- 1778 De aftakkede officerer as Lotte
- 1778 Den forliebte autor og tjener as Lisette, kammerpige
- 1778 Den forslidte kærlighed as Lisette
- 1778 Den knurvorne doktor as Rosine
- 1778 Den nye prøve as Lisette
- 1778 Den politiske kandestøber as Anneke
- 1778 Den uformodentlige forhindring as Pernille, Julies pige
- 1778 Den uformodentlige hjemkomst as Pernille
- 1778 Det aftvungne samtykke as Pernille
- 1778 Det lykkelige skibbrud as Pernille, Jeronimus' pige
- 1778 Det uventede møde as Balkis
- 1778 Eugenie as Bethy, kammerpige hos Eugenie
- 1778 Huset i oprør as Pernille, Leonores pige
- 1778 Stifmoderen as Pernille, Leonores kammerpige
- 1778 Ulysses von Ithacia as Elisa, kammerpige
- 1779 Balders død as Valkyrie
- 1779 Celinde as Lisette
- 1779 De fortrædelige hændelser as Frosine
- 1779 Den dobbelte prøve as Lisette
- 1779 Den forlorne søn as Pernille, Leonores pige
- 1779 Den gifte filosof as Finette, Melites pige
- 1779 Den indbildt syge as Antoinette
- 1779 Den kærlige forbitrelse as Marine, Lucias kammerpige
- 1779 Den lykkelige fejltagelse as Antoinette
- 1779 Den ærgerrige as Hyacinte, kammerpige hos Donna Beatrix
- 1779 Faderen as Madam Papillon, kræmmerske
- 1779 Hekseri as Pige
- 1779 Huset i oprør as Pernille, Leonores pige
- 1779 Jean de France aas Marthe, Jeronimus' pige
- 1779 Maskeraden a Pernille
- 1779 Melampe as Dorothea
- 1779 Menechmi as Finette, Aramintes kammerpige
- 1779 Minna af Barnhelm as Franciska, hendes pige
- 1779 Uden hoved og hale as Kærling
- 1780 Bondepigen ved hoffet as Ninette, bondepige
- 1780 Den honnette ambition as Pernille
- 1780 Den tavse pige as Ines, Donna Marcelas kammerpige
- 1780 Den velbaarne frue as Fru klinge, en officers enke
- 1780 Det gavmilde testament as Lisette
- 1780 Det talende skilderi as Columbine, Isabelles kammerpige
- 1780 Jacob von Tyboe as Pernille
- 1780 Mændenes skole as Lisette, Leonores pige
- 1780 Zemire og Azor as Fatme, Sanders datter
- 1781 Arsene as Oraklet
- 1781 Democritus as Cleanthis, Isemenes kammerpige
- 1781 Den alt for nysgerrige bejler as Nerine, Julies pige
- 1781 Greven af Walltron as Lisette, kammerpige
- 1781 Kærlighed paa prøve as Pernille, Leonoras pige
- 1781 Soliman den anden as Roxelane, en fransk slavinde
- 1782 Cecilia as Lisette, Cecilias pige
- 1782 Crispin lakaj og doktor as Lise, tjenestepige
- 1782 De aftakkede officerer as Lotte
- 1782 De nysgerrige fruentimmere as Lisette, Pige hos Olivia og Julie
- 1782 Den nye prøve as Lisette
- 1782 Don Juan as Karen
- 1782 Eugenie as Bethy, kammerpige hos Eugenie
- 1782 Henrik og Pernille as Pernille
- 1782 Kærlighed uden strømper as Mette, Grethes fortrolige
- 1782 Skovhuggeren as Berte
- 1783 De to gerrige as Lise, husjomfru hos knapskær
- 1783 Søofficererne Mistress as Wellum, en modehandlerske
- 1783 Væddeløbet as Marton
- 1784 Aglae as Rodobe
- 1784 Bagtalelsens skole as Lady Sneerwell
- 1784 De uventede tilfælde as Marton, Grevindens pige
- 1784 Den butte velgører as Marton, Gerontes husholderske
- 1784 Ulysses von Ithacia as Elisa, kammerpige
- 1784 Ægteskabsdjævelen as Bolette, kammerpige
- 1785 Bagtalelsens skole as Lady Sneerwell
- 1785 Barselstuen as Pige hos Corfitz / Stine Isenkræmmers
- 1785 De nysgerrige mandfolk as Fru Lisidor
- 1785 Den Blinde klartseende as Pernille, Leonoras pige
- 1785 Det foregivne hekseri as En ung zigeunerinde
- 1786 Den løgnagtige as tjener Lisette
- 1786 Den nye prøve as Lisette
- 1786 Det unge Menneske efter moden as Trine
- 1787 Aglae as Glycerie
- 1787 Bagtalelsens as skole Lady Sneerwell
- 1787 Barselstuen as Stine Isenkræmmers
- 1787 Claudina af Villa Bella as Sibylla
- 1787 Det foregivne hekseri as En ung zigeunerinde
- 1787 Kvaternen as Madame Smidsk
- 1788 Aglae as Glycerie
- 1788 Bagtalelsens skole as Lady Sneerwell
- 1788 Barselstuen as Stine Isenkræmmers
- 1788 Bussemanden as Bolette
- 1788 Cecilia as Lisette, Cecilias pige
- 1788 De to gerrige as Lise, husjomfru hos knapskær
- 1788 Forvandlingerne as Grethe, kælderpige
- 1788 Hekseri as Pige
- 1789 Bagtalelsens skole as Lady Sneerwell
- 1789 Barselstuen as Pige hos Corfitz
- 1789 De usynlige as Columbine, Harlekins fæstemø
- 1790 Ariadne paa Naxos as Orkade
- 1790 De nysgerrige fruentimmere as Lisette, Pige hos Olivia og Julie
- 1790 Det talende skilderi as Columbine, Isabelles kammerpige
- 1790 Steffen og Lise as Grethe, Jacobs kone
- 1790 Ulysses von Ithacia as Elisa, kammerpige
- 1791 Bagtalelsens skole as Lady Sneerwell
- 1791 Barselstuen as Stine Isenkræ
