= Statue of Ludvig Holberg, Copenhagen =

Statue of Ludvig Holberg in Copenhagen, Denmark

Coordinates: 55°40′48″N 12°35′13″E

Ludvig Holberg
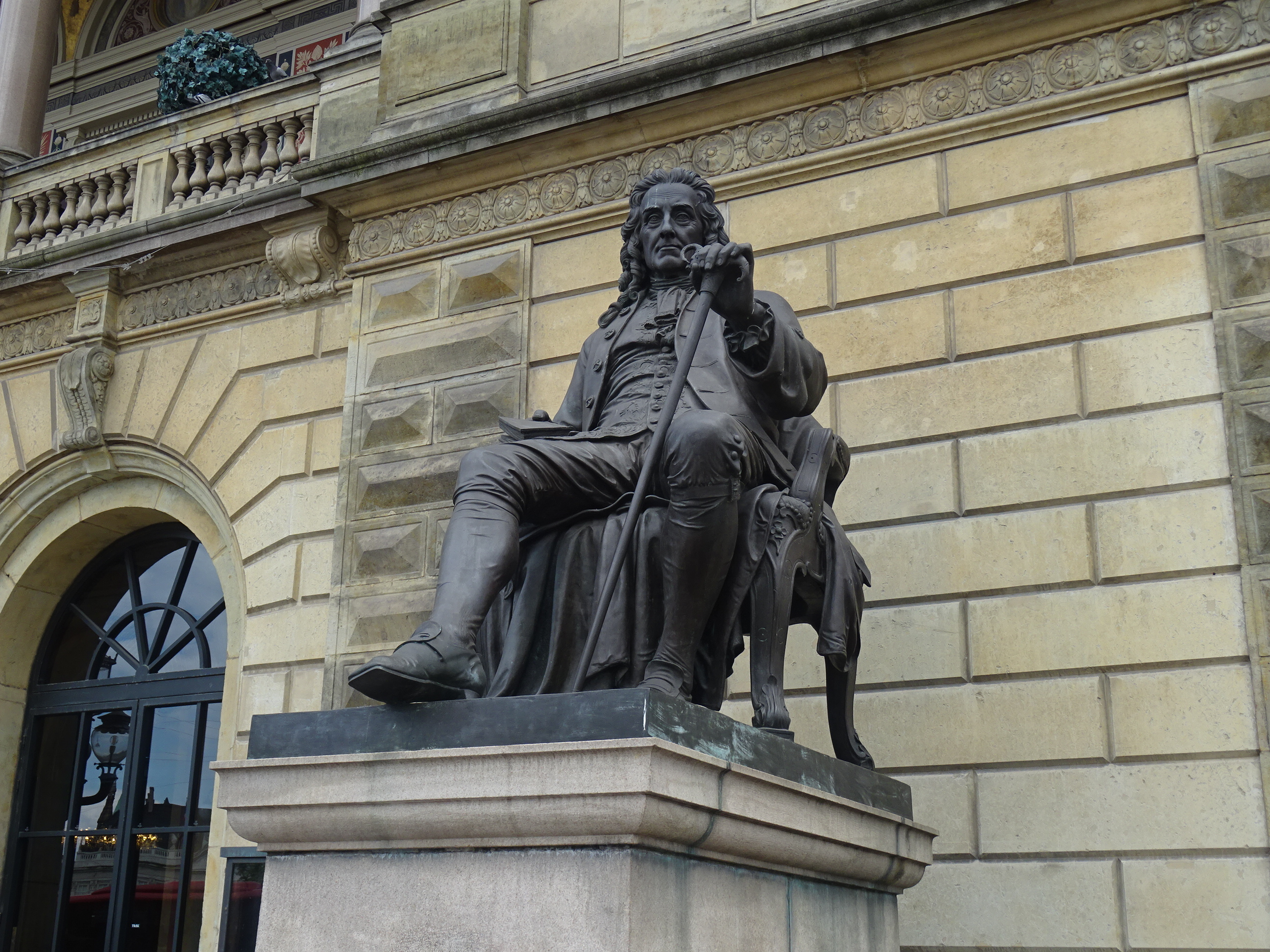
- The monument in 2023
- Interactive map of Ludvig Holberg
- Location: Copenhagen, Denmark
- Designer: Theobald Stein
- Type: Statue
- Material: Bronze
- Completion date: 1874
- Opening date: 1765

The statue of Ludvig Holberg by Theobald Stein, together with Herman Wilhelm Bissen's statue of Adam Oehlenschläger, flanks the main entrance to the Royal Danish Theatre on Kongens Nytorv in Copenhagen, Denmark. It was created by Stein in conjunction with the inauguration of Vilhelm Dahlerup's new theatre building in 1875. Bissen's statue of Oehlenschläger is from 1861 and was originally located on Sankt Annæ Plads.

== Description ==
The bronze statue of Holberg depicts him in a comfortable pose, leaned back in an armchair with his right leg stretched out, holding a book in one hand and his walking stick in the other. He is dressed in clothes typical of the late 18th century. Stein based his portrayl of Holberg on Johan Roselius's portrait painting in Sorø Academy and Bertel Thorvaldsen's 1839 portrait bust. The statue has been described as having "a subtly satirical facial expression as if he is watching all the Jean de Frances and political tinkers that are passing by on the square in front of him".

== History ==
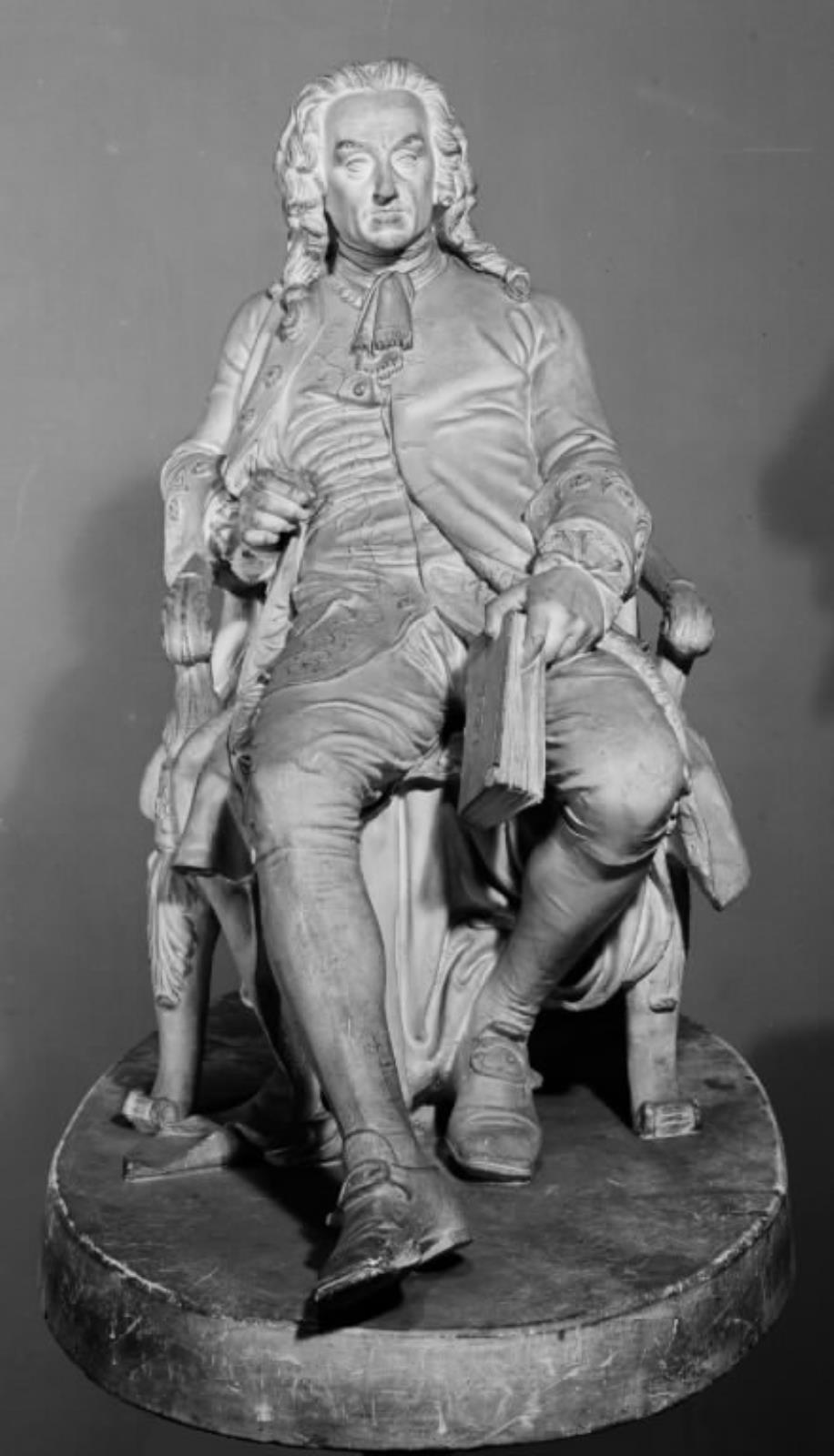
Stein's 1851 statuette of Ludvig Holberg

In 1851, Theobald Stein won Neuhausen's Prize (De Neuhausenske Præmier) with a half-size portrait statuette of Ludvig Holberg. The other participants in the competition were Otto Evens, Thorvald Mule and August Saabye. In the early 1870s, Stein was commissioned to create a colossal version of this early work for the new Royal Danish Theatre on Kongens Nytorv. Together with Herman Wilhelm Bissen's 1861 statue of Adam Oehlenschläger, which had until then been located on Sankt Annæ Plads, it was supposed to flank the main entrance of the new theatre building. honouring what was regarded as the two founding fathers of Danish theatre. Since Bissen's statue of Oehlenschläger also depicted him seated in a chair with a book, Stein saw a need for his Holberg statue to stand out from it more clearly. On Wilhelm Marstrand's advice, he therefore chose to add a walking stick to the composition. The new building for the Royal Danish Theatre was inaugurated on 15 October 1984. The Ludvig Holberg statue was unveiled on 31 October 1875. An incidental song by Hans Peter Holst was performed at the event.

== Other versions ==
The original plaster model of Stein's portrait bust (signed "28 February 1850, original") was acquired by the Ny Carlsberg Glyptotek at an auction of Stein's estate on 2 April 1902. An 1851 plaster version of Stein's portrait statuette was acquired by the Royal Collection and is now in the collection of the National Gallery of Denmark. Two 1890 bronze casts of the 1851 statuette are on display in the Frederiksborg Museum in Hillerød and the Theatre Museum in Copenhagen.
