= Antonsen =

Antonsen is a surname. It derived from the Antonius root name. Notable people with the surname include:

- Ane Grethe Antonsen (1855–1930), Danish actress
- Anders Antonsen (born 1997), Danish badminton player
- Atle Antonsen (born 1969), Norwegian entertainer
- Ivar Antonsen (born 1946), Norwegian musician
- Jens Petter Antonsen (born 1963), Norwegian musician
- Kasper Antonsen (born 1994), Danish badminton player
- Kent-Are Antonsen (born 1995), Norwegian footballer
- Linda Antonsen, Norwegian athlete
- Ole Edvard Antonsen (born 1962), Norwegian musician
- Thomas Marbory Antonsen, American engineer

== See also ==
- Antonson
- Team Antonsen
