= Antonson =

Antonson is a surname and given name. Notable people with this name include the following:

== Middle names ==
- Ola Antonson Holsen (1808–1864), Norwegian politician
- Jakob Mathias Antonson Lothe (1881–1975), Norwegian politician

== Last names ==
- Niklas Antonson, musician in 2000s Danish bands Slaraffenland & Efterklang and artist

== See also ==
- Antonsen
- Antonsson
