= Randi Lindtner Næss =

Norwegian actress and singer (1905–2009)

- Born: 11 May 1905; Bergen, Norway
- Died: 20 May 2009 (aged 104); Bergen, Norway
- Occupation(s): Actress, singer

Randi Lindtner Næss (11 May 1905 – 20 May 2009) was a Norwegian actress and singer.

== Biography ==
She was the daughter of Ragnvald Andreas Lindtner (1879–1966) and Thea Johanne Olsen (1884–1973). She was a sister of actor Lothar Lindtner (1917–2005) and was married to Birger Næss (1900–1976). She was the mother of actor Arne Lindtner Næss. Through her daughter, Berit Næss, she was mother-in-law to film actor Rolf Søder (1918–1998) .

Næss made her stage debut at Den Nationale Scene in 1928, and was employed there until 1974 and then continued as a freelancer. She often appeared in plays by Ludvig Holberg and was frequently featured in operettas and comedies. Her last stage job was in 1991. She died in 2009, nine days after her 104th birthday.
