= An Embarrassing Position =

An Embarrassing Position is a short play written in 1895 by American author Kate Chopin, which was adapted as a comic opera in 2010 by American composer Dan Shore.

== The play ==
Chopin wrote An Embarrassing Position while living in St. Louis, Missouri. She submitted it to the New York Herald drama competition, but did not win. It appeared in the St. Louis Mirror on December 19, 1895. Later, interest in her work grew, and in 1970 the play was published as part of Kate Chopin: Complete Novels and Stories by the Library of America.

The play has been studied as an example of early American literature; for example, it is included in Yvonne Collioud Sisko's book Looking at Literature: 12 Short Stories, a Play, and a Novel.

== The opera ==
After Dan Shore rewrote Chopin's play as a comic opera, An Embarrassing Position was first produced by the New England Conservatory in 2010, and went on to win a Big Easy Entertainment Award and the National Opera Association's Chamber Opera Competition. The opera has been praised for its lyricism and its evocation of turn-of-the-century New Orleans.

The opera was favorably reviewed in The Times-Picayune/The New Orleans Advocate in New Orleans. and Gambit magazine.
