= Dan Shore =

American classical composer

Dan Shore (born 1975) is an American composer and playwright from Allentown, Pennsylvania, whose works include The Beautiful Bridegroom, An Embarrassing Position, Travel, Works of Mercy, and Lady Orchid.

== Education ==
Shore attended the New England Conservatory of Music in Boston, where he studied composition with Lee Hyla, Malcolm Peyton, and Scott Wheeler. He spent four years as a composer and lyricist in the BMI-Lehman Engel Musical Theatre Workshop and studied opera composition in Denmark on a Fulbright Program grant. He received his Ph.D. in composition from the Graduate Center of the City University of New York, where studied playwriting with Tina Howe and composition with David Del Tredici.

== Compositions ==
His comic opera The Beautiful Bridegroom, based on the play "Den forvandlede Brudgom" by Ludvig Holberg, was awarded first prize in the National Opera Association's Chamber Opera Composition Competition in 2009. Written for a cast of six sopranos, it has been produced over thirty times. Another comic opera, An Embarrassing Position, based on a sketch by the same name by Kate Chopin, received a Big Easy Entertainment Award in 2011. It also received first prize in the National Opera Association's Chamber Opera Composition Competition, in 2013. His most recent project is the opera Freedom Ride, which commemorates the 1961 Freedom Rides. Scenes from the opera were previewed at a 2011 gala hosted by Longue Vue House and Gardens, which originally commissioned the opera. In August 2016, a suite of excerpts from the opera was performed in Mexico City with La Orquesta Sinfónica de Minería. The completed opera will have its world premiere in 2020 at Chicago Opera Theater, conducted by Lidiya Yankovskaya and directed by Tazewell Thompson.

== Academia ==
Shore has taught at Baruch College in New York City, Emerson College in Boston, and Xavier University in New Orleans, and now teaches at the Boston Conservatory at Berklee.
