= Ståle Dyrvik =

Norwegian historian (1943–2022)

- Born: 26 October 1943
- Died: 25 November 2022 (aged 79)
- Occupation: Historian

Ståle Dyrvik (26 October 1943 — 25 November 2022) was a Norwegian historian.

He graduated with the cand.philol. degree from the University of Bergen in 1971. From 1975 to 1988 he worked as an associate professor (førsteamanuensis) at the University of Bergen, and he became a professor there in 1988.

He was a member of the Norwegian Academy of Science and Letters.

Dyrvik died in his sleep on 25 November 2022.

== Selected bibliography ==
- Norge under eneveldet: 1720-1800, 1976
- Den lange fredstiden 1720-1784, 1978, volume 8 of Cappelens Norgeshistorie
- Historisk demografi. Ei innføring i metodane, 1983
- Mellom brødre 1780-1830, 1996, volume 7 of Aschehougs Norgeshistorie
- Truede tvillingriker 1648-1720, 1998, volume 3 of Danmark-Norge 1380-1814
- Den demografiske overgangen Utsyn & innsikt, 2003
- Året 1814 Utsyn & innsikt, 2005
