= Antonsson =

Antonsson is a surname of Swedish origin. Among Icelandic names, Antonsson is a patronymic name meaning son of Anton. It derived from the Antonius root name. The name may refer to:

- Bertil Antonsson (1921–2006), Swedish Olympic wrestler
- Daniel Antonsson (contemporary), Swedish guitarist and songwriter
- Jan-Eric Antonsson (contemporary), Swedish Olympic badminton player
- Johannes Antonsson (1921–1995), Swedish politician; government minister and provincial governor
- Markús Örn Antonsson (born 1943), Icelandic politician; Mayor of Reykjavík 1991–94
- Mikael Antonsson (born 1981), Swedish professional football player playing for FC Copenhagen
- Marcus Antonsson (born 1991), Swedish professional football player playing for Leeds United

== See also ==
- Antonson
