= Christen Nielsen Holberg =

Norwegian Army officer (c. 1625–1686)

Christen (Vielum?) Nielsen Holberg
- Born: c. 1625
- Died: 1686
- Allegiance: Denmark-Norway
- Service years: 1640-1679
- Commands: Sundfjordske Kompani; Sognske Kompani; Bergenhus fortress
- Conflicts: Second Northern War; Battle of Halden 1659; Second Anglo-Dutch War; Battle of Vågen 1665; Scanian War; Siege of Bohus 1676

Christen Nielsen Holberg (a.k.a. Christian Holberg, c. 1625 – 1686) was an officer in the Norwegian Army. He was also the father of Ludvig Holberg. In 1653 he was hired as a lieutenant to serve with Bergenhusiske Regiment both in Bergenhus len and on Bergenhus Fortress In 1659 he was appointed commander of Sundfjordske Kompani of Bergenhusiske Regiment with the rank of captain. During the Bjelke War he and his company participated in the defence of Halden against the Swedes. On August 2, 1665 he participated in the Battle of Vågen as a Major. In 1672 he was a lieutenant colonel in the Sundfjordske Kompani. In 1675 he was a member of the regimental staff and the commander of Sognske Kompani. During the Gyldenløve War he was given the responsibility of raising two new companies for the regiment before joining it in Sweden in 1676 where he participated in the siege of Bohus Fortress. Upon returning to Norway later that year he was sent back to Bergen to be temporary commander of the Bergenhus Fortress in the place of Johan Caspar von Cicignon. In 1679, he left the service of Bergenhusiske Regiment. He died in 1686.
