= The Fidget =

1723 comic play by Ludvig Holberg

Den Stundesløse
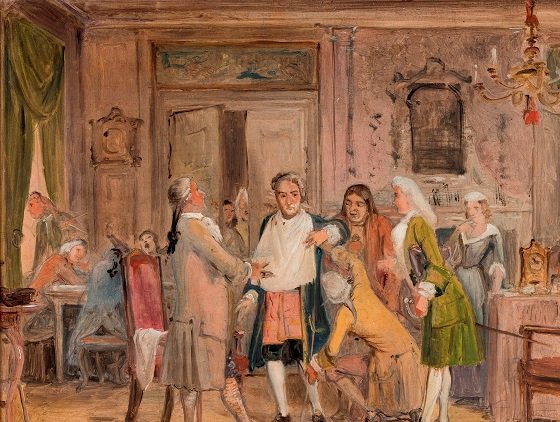
- Wilhelm Marstrand: Act 1, Scene 6: Vielgeschrey’s hardships,
- Original language: Danish
- Written by: Ludvig Holberg
- Genre: Comedy
- Setting: Denmark

Premiere
- Date: 23 March 1726
- Place: Lille Grønnegade Theatre, Copenhagen, Denmark

The Fidget (Danish: Den stundesløse) is a satirical play published by Ludvig Holberg in 1723. It premiered at Lille Grønnegade Theatre in Copenhagen on 25 November 1726.

== Plot summary ==
Vielgeschrey, a fidget merchant constantly surrounded by hubbub, is prone to believing that he is much more busy than he really is. This eventually makes him suffer a tragicomic fate.

== Roles ==
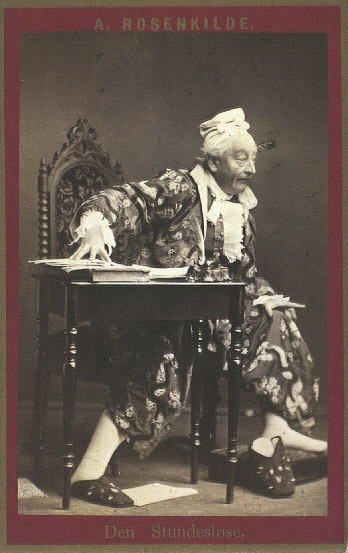
Adolph Rosenkilde as Vielgeschrey

- Vielgeschrei
- Pernille
- Oldfux
- Magdelone
- Leander
- Leonora
- Leonard
- Erik Madsen
- Peder Eriksen
- Ane
- A barber
- Corfitz
- Christen Griffel
- En bonde

== Adaptions ==
=== Denmark ===
DT has produced a Danish television version of Den Stundesløse that was first broadcast on 19 April 1973. It was directed by John Price and starred Jørgen Reenberg (Vielgescrey), Ghita Nørby (Pernille) and Henning Moritzen (Oldfux).

=== Norway ===
NEK has produced Norwegian-language "made-for-television" of Den stundesløse that was first broadcast on 24 January 1964. It was directed by Per Simonnæs and Ulf Stenbjørn and starred Rolf Berntzen (Vielgeschrei ), Randi Lindtner Næss (Pernille) and Lothar Lindtner (Oldfux ). NRK released a new television version of the play on 7 February 1978. It was directed by Magne Bleness and starred Arne Aas, Bentein Baardson, Thom Bastholm-

== English translations ==
- Holberg, Ludvig (1912). Three Comedies. Translated by Hime, H(enry) W(illiam) L(ovett). London: Longmans, Green and Co. OCLC 6079882.
- —— (1946). Four Plays by Holberg. Translated by Alexander, Henry. Princeton University Press for the American-Scandinavian Foundation. OCLC 1381528.
- Heiberg, Johan Ludvig; Holberg, Ludvig (1999). Three Danish Comedies. Translated by Meyer, Michael Leverson. London: Oberon Books. ISBN 9781840020601. OCLC 1098665264.
