= Gert Westphaler =

1722 comic play by Ludvig Holberg

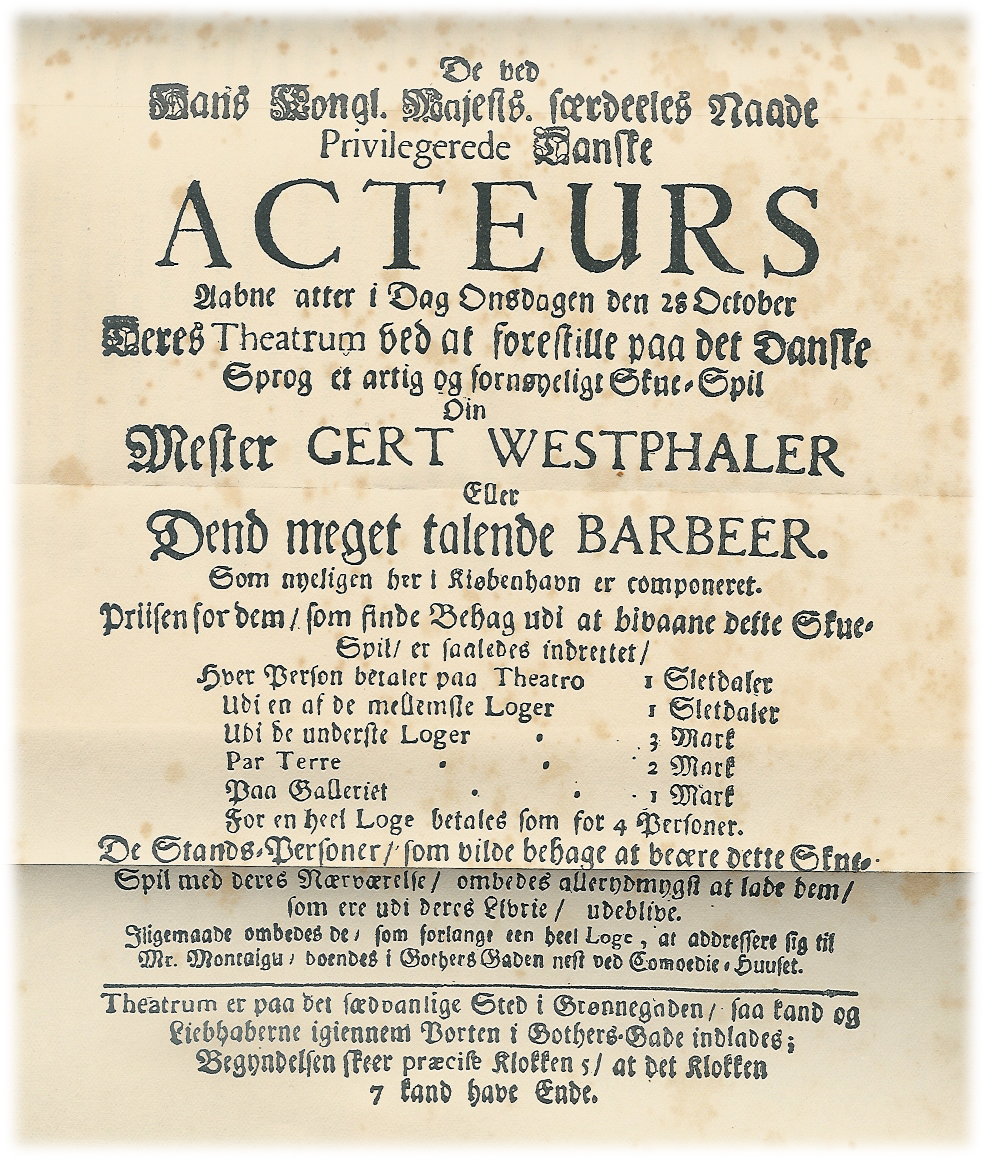
- Gert Westphaler poster, the oldest preserved poster for a Holberg play
- Written by: Ludvig Holberg
- Original language: Danish
- Genre: Comedy
- Setting: Denmark

Premiere
- Date premiered: 1722
- Place premiered: Lille Grønnegade Theatre, Copenhagen, Denmark

Gert Westphaler or The Loquacious Barber (Danish: Mester Gert Westphaler eller Dend meget talende Barbeer) is a satirical play written by the Norwegian-Danish playwright Ludvig Holberg. It premiered in five sets at the Lille Grønnegade Theatre in Copenhagen on 28 October 1722 but Holberg later adapted it into a one- set version.

== Reception ==
Holberg comments on the reception of the play in his first Latin-language memoir from 1728: The Loquacious Barber displeased almost all spectators in the audience to such an extent that quite a few left before it ended, some discretely and secretly, others openly and bluntly. I had expected something else, having always loved this eye-nest of mine among my comedies.

== Adaptions ==
DR has produced a "made for television version" of the play that was first broadcast on 29 March 1976. It was directed by Hans Rosenquist and was starring Stig Hoffmeyer, Ruth Brejnholm, Lisbet Lipschitz and Ejnar Hans Jensen.

== English translations ==
- Holberg, Ludvig (1827). "The Babbling Barber: A Comedy in One Act". The Odd Volume: Second Series. Translated by Corbett, M. London: Longman, Rees, Orme, Brown, and Green. pp. 291–348. OCLC 11855940.
- —— (1950). Seven One-act Plays. Translated by Alexander, Henry. Princeton University Press for the American-Scandinavian Foundation. OCLC 1612009.
