= Erasmus Montanus =

1722 comic play by Ludvig Holberg

- Anders de Wahl as Erasmus Montanus, 1910
- Written by: Ludvig Holberg
- Original language: Danish
- Genre: Comedy
- Setting: Rural Denmark

Premiere
- Date premiered: 1747
- Place premiered: Lille Grønnegade Theatre, Copenhagen, Denmark

Erasmus Montanus is a satirical play about academic snobbery set in rural Denmark. Written by Ludvig Holberg in 1722, the script was first published in 1731 and performed in 1747. Today, it is among Holberg's most frequently performed works. The play centers on its eponymous protagonist who returns to his rural village after studying in Copenhagen to find his new worldview causes conflicts in his everyday life.

== History ==
The script was written in 1722 and 1723, but was not published until 1731 in the 5th volume of Den Danske Skue-Plads, a collection of plays by Holberg. The play itself then did not premier until 1747. It is likely that Holberg delayed its release to avoid backlash because of the play's critical nature. The play criticises the academic profession that Holberg himself was a part of and the educational pedagogy he experienced at the University of Copenhagen as a Professor of Metaphysics. Other scholars speculate that the play's performance was delayed simply because no company cared to put the production on. When it finally premiered in 1747 it was initially unsuccessful, as its particular satirical style was no longer popular. It has since been recognised as one of Holberg's best comedies and for its important historical perspective.

== Synopsis ==
The play begins with Jeppe Berg in his hometown in Zealand. Jeppe receives a letter from his son, Rasmus Berg, who has been away studying in Copenhagen. Jeppe is unable to understand the letter, which had been written in Latin, and seeks out Deacon Per to translate it for him. The letter states that Rasmus will be returning home soon.

When Rasmus returns after much anticipation he eagerly demonstrates his new knowledge. When speaking with his parents, he uses Latin phrases and academic terminology. He insists that the townspeople refer to him by his Latinised name, Erasmus Montanus. He quickly gets into arguments with everyone he encounters, eager to "dispute". He goes on to "prove" a number of absurdities, such as that his mother is a rock ("A rock cannot fly. Mother cannot fly. Ergo, Mother is a rock"). He is contrasted with his brother Jacob, who is only interested in knowledge that is of practical application. His persistent arguing gets him into trouble with the parents of his fiancée Lisbet, who refuse to allow their daughter to marry someone who believes the Earth is round. His fiancée begs him to retract his statements that the Earth revolves around the Sun, but he refuses.

The townspeople, exhausted by Erasmus' antics, plot to get him to leave the city by tricking him into enlisting for military service. With the help of a lieutenant, he is tricked into accepting a coin representing an enlistment bonus. Desperate to free himself from military obligations, he reconsiders his earlier arguments. Ultimately, he retracts his statement that the Earth is round, declaring that "the Earth is as flat as a pancake". Thus, he is allowed to marry Lisbet.

== Excerpt ==
A village street showing Jeppe's house. Jeppe, with a letter in his hand.
Jeppe. "It is a shame that the deacon is not in town, for there's so much Latin in my son's letter that I can't understand. Tears come to my eyes when I think that a poor peasant's son has got so much book-learning, especially as we aren't tenants of the university. I have heard from people who know about learning that he can dispute with any clergyman alive. Oh, if only my wife and I could have the joy of hearing him preach on the hill, before we die, we shouldn't grudge all the money we have spent on him! I can see that Peer the deacon doesn't much relish the idea of my son's coming. I believe that he is afraid of Rasmus Berg. It is a terrible thing about these scholarly people. They are so jealous of each other, and no one of them can endure the thought that another is as learned as he. The good man preaches fine sermons here in the village and can talk about envy so that the tears come to my eyes; but it seems to me that he isn't entirely free from that fault himself. I can't understand why it should be so. If any one said that a neighbor of mine understood farming better than I, should I take that to heart? Should I hate my neighbor for that? No, indeed, Jeppe Berg would never do such a thing. But if here isn't Peer the deacon!"

— act I, scene I

== Characters ==
- Erasmus Montanus/Rasmus Berg: protagonist; the scholar
- Jeppe Berg: his father
- Nille: his mother
- Jacob: his brother
- Lisbet: Erasmus's fiancee
- Jeronimus: her father
- Magdelone: her Mother
- Deacon Per: parish clerk
- Jesper: The Baliff
- A Lieutenant
- Corporal Niels

== Film productions and adaptations ==
- Erasmus Montanus (1951)
- Erasmus Montanus (1956), directed by Ole Walbom
- Erasmus Montanus (1971), directed by Magne Bleness
- Erasmus Montanus (1973), directed by Kaspar Rostrup
- Jorden er Flad or A terra é plana (1977), directed by Henrik Stangerup

== English translations ==
- Holberg, Ludvig (1871). "Erasmus Montanus: An Old Danish Comedy". Fraser's Magazine. 84. Translated by Toft, Peter. Longmans, Green, and Company: 69–96.
- —— (1885). Erasmus Montanus, or Rasmus Berg. Translated by Weber, T. Copenhagen: T. Weber's Academy. OCLC 80046396.
- —— (1914). Comedies by Holberg: Jeppe of the hill, The Political Tinker, Erasmus Montanus. Translated by Campbell, Oscar James; Schenck, Frederick. New York: The American-Scandinavian Foundation. OCLC 477029781.
- —— (1989). Erasmus Montanus. Translated by Næss, Petter. Madison, WI: Dept. of Scandinavian Studies, University of Wisconsin. OCLC 20943193.
- —— (1990). Jeppe of the Hill and Other Comedies. Translated by Argetsinger, Gerald S.; Rossel, Sven Hakon. Carbondale: Southern Illinois University Press. ISBN 978-0-8093-1480-5. OCLC 1156867790.

== Gallery ==
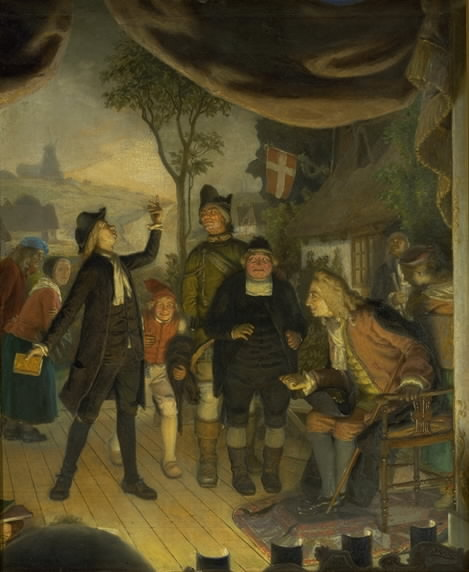
Holberg attends a rehearsal of Erasmus Montanus, Lorenz Frølich, 1888.

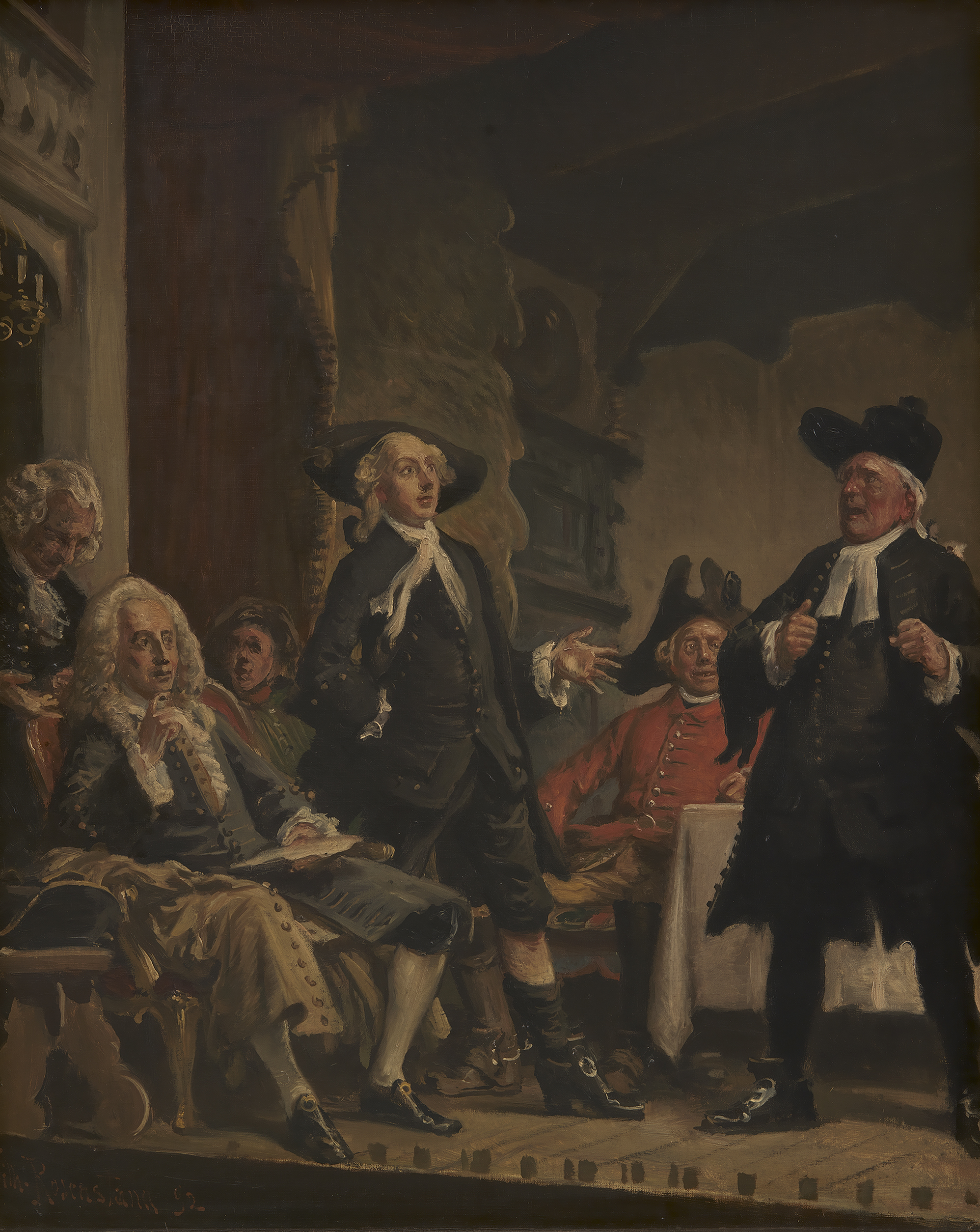
Holberg attends a rehearsal of Erasmus Montanus, Vilhelm Rosenstand, 1892.

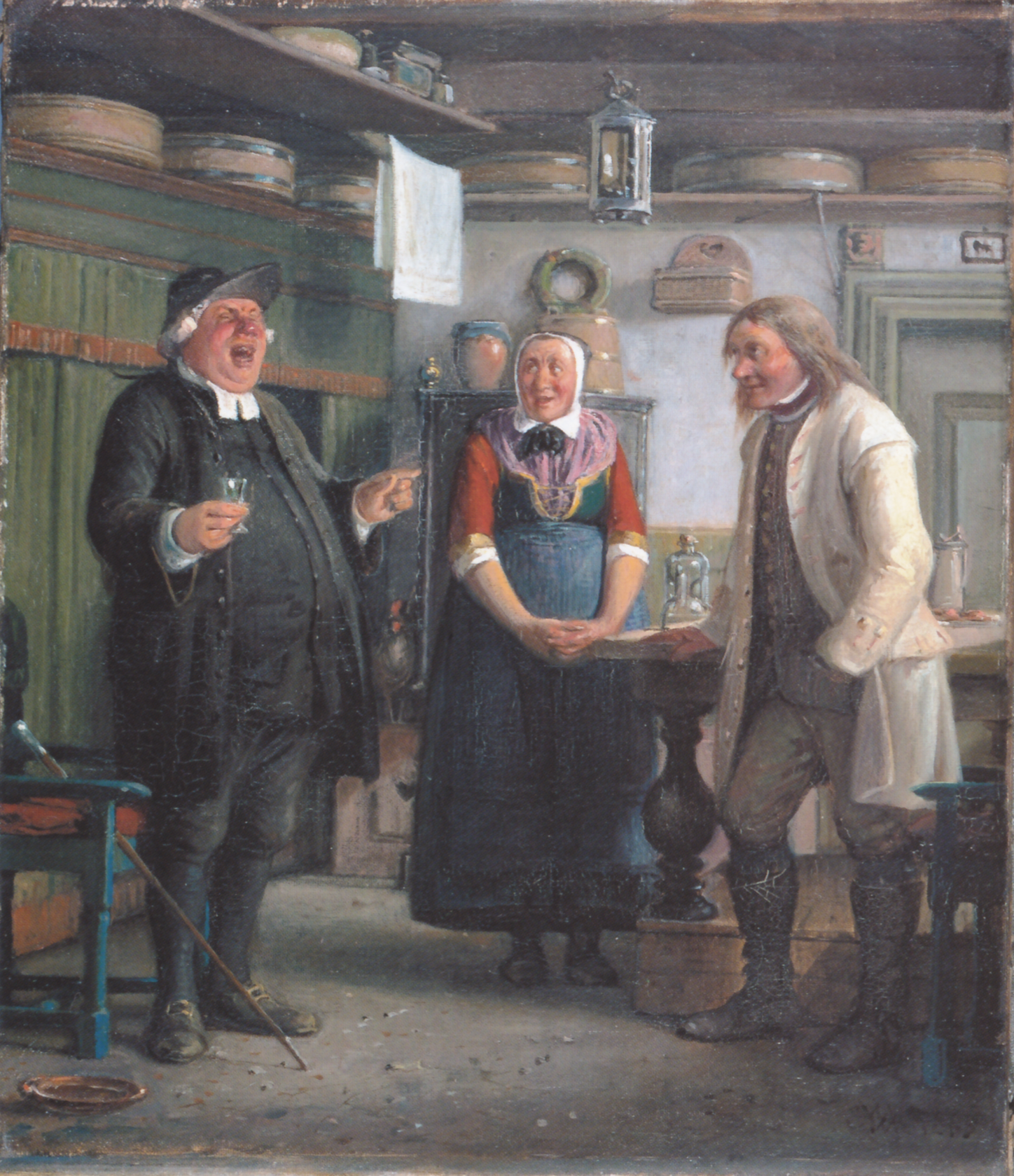
Depiction of Deacon Per singing for a glass of schnapps in Act I, scene 4, Wilhelm Marstrand, 1865.

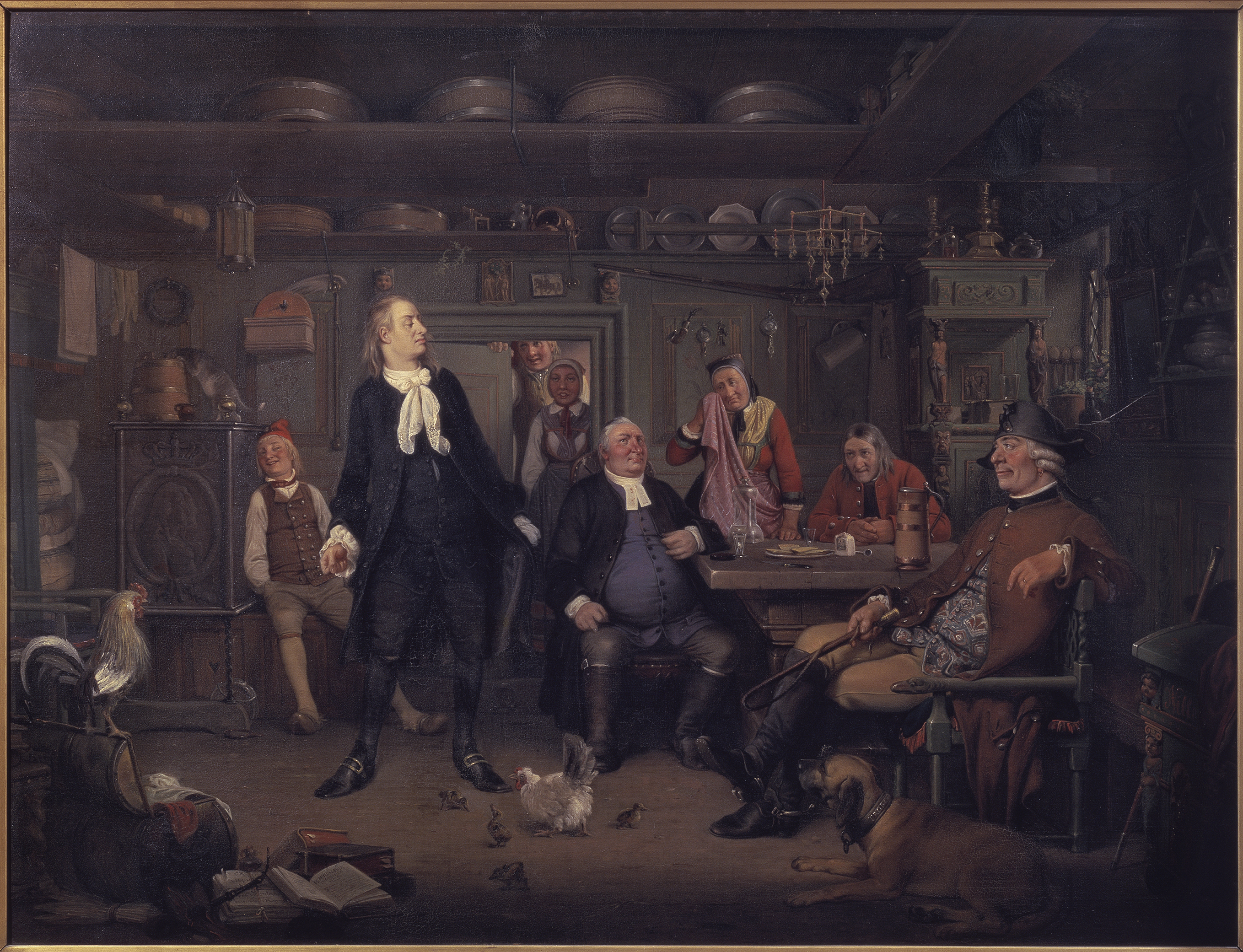
Depiction of Act III, scene 3 by Wilhelm Marstrand.

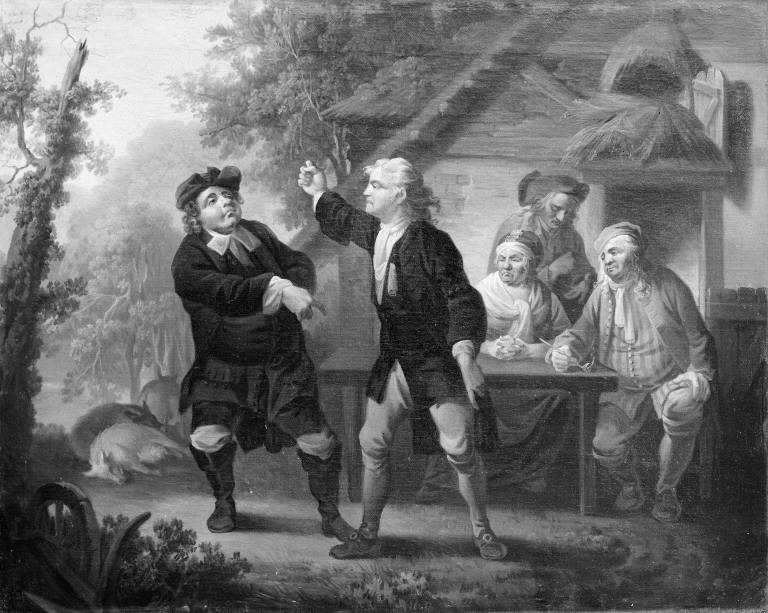
Depiction of Act III, scene 3 by Christian August Lorentzen.

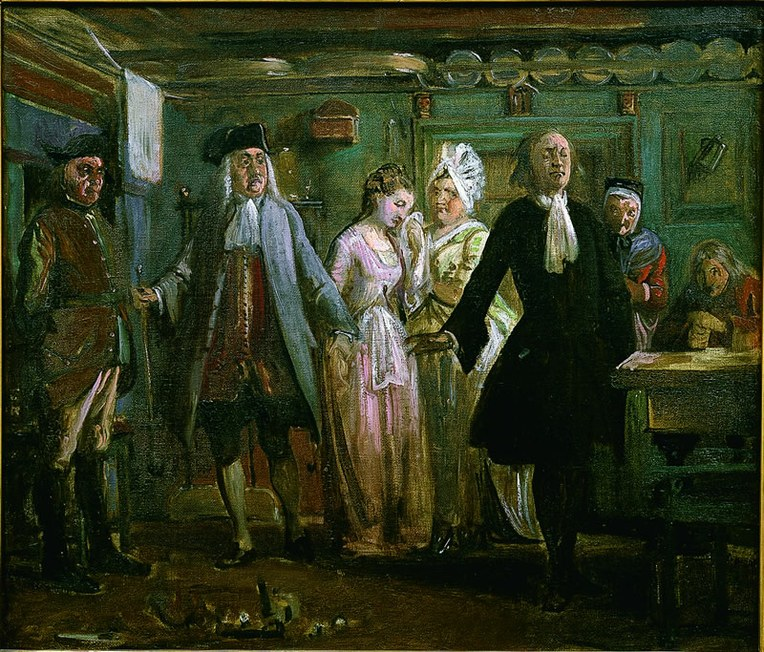
"Erasmus' standhaftighed." Depiction of Act III, scene VI, Wilhelm Marstrand.
