= The Christmas Party (play) =

1724 comic play by Ludvig Holberg

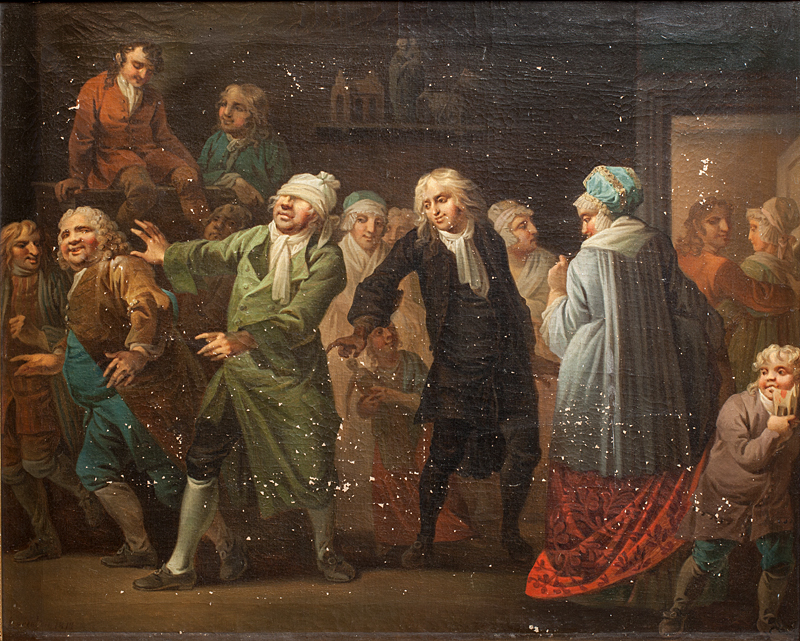
- C. A. Lorentzen: Julestuen, Scene 13 (1813)
- Original language: Danish
- Written by: Ludvig Holberg
- Genre: Comedy
- Setting: Denmark

Premiere
- Date: 1724
- Place: Lille Grønnegade Theatre, Copenhagen, Denmark

The Christmas Party (Danish: Julestuen) is a one-set, comic play by Norwegian-Danish playwright Ludvig Holberg. It premiered at Lille Grønnegade Theatre in Copenhagen in 1724.

== Plot summary ==
Jeronimus, a grumpy, old man, refuses to host a Christmas party in his house since he finds the tradition tasteless and inappropriate. His sister unsuccessfully tries to persuade him but he is finally won over by s mastershoemaker's arguments about the "foundation of the law of nature".

== English translations ==
- Holberg, Ludvig (1950). Seven One-act Plays. Translated by Alexander, Henry. Princeton University Press for the American-Scandinavian Foundation. OCLC 1612009.
- —— (1990). Jeppe of the Hill and Other Comedies. Translated by Argetsinger, Gerald S.; Rossel, Sven Hakon. Carbondale: Southern Illinois University Press. ISBN 978-0-8093-1480-5. OCLC 1156867790.
