= Niels Klim's Underground Travels =

1741 novel by Ludvig Holberg

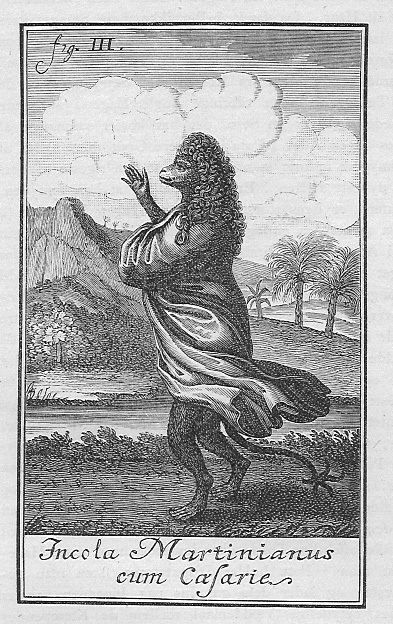
- "Citizen of Martinia with a wig" Illustration from the 1741 first edition.
- Author: Ludvig Holberg
- Original title: Nicolai Klimii Iter Subterraneum
- Language: Latin
- Genre: fantasy-science fiction
- Published: 1741
- Publication place: Denmark-Norway

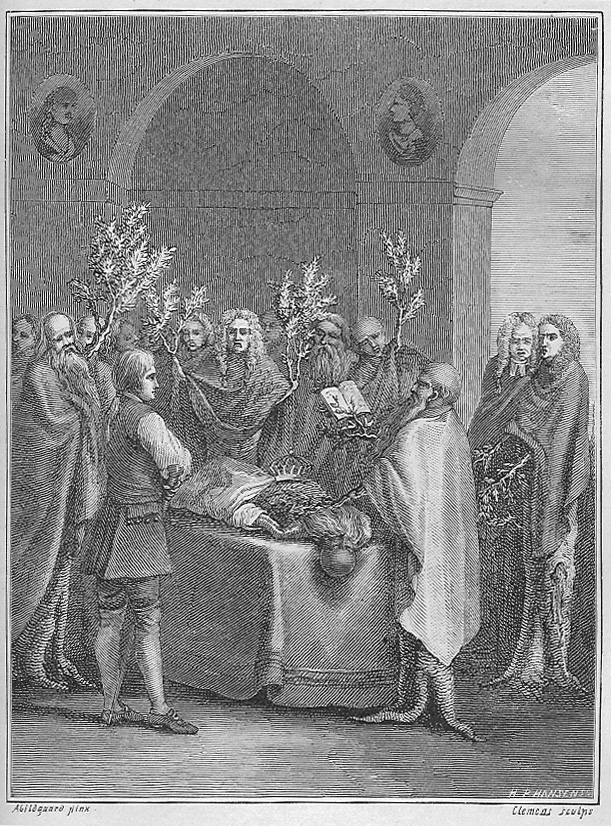
"Sentencing the deceased citizen of Potu." Illustration engraved by Johan Frederik Clemens after drawing by Nicolai Abraham Abildgaard, from the 1789 deluxe edition translated into Danish by poet Jens Baggesen.

Niels Klim's Underground Travels, originally published in Latin as Nicolai Klimii Iter Subterraneum (1741), is a satirical science-fiction/fantasy novel written by the Norwegian-Danish author Ludvig Holberg. His only novel, it describes a utopian society from an outsider's point of view, and often pokes fun at diverse cultural and social topics such as morality, science, sexual equality, religion, governments, and philosophy.

== Plot summary ==
The novel starts with a foreword that assures that everything in the story is a real account of the title character's exploits in the Underworld. The story is set, according to the book, in the Norwegian harbor town of Bergen in 1664, after Klim returns from Copenhagen, where he has studied philosophy and theology at the University of Copenhagen and graduated magna cum laude. His curiosity drives him to investigate a strange cave in a mountainside above the town, which sends out regular gusts of warm air. He ends up falling down the hole, and after a while he finds himself floating in free space.

After a few days of orbiting the planet which revolves around the inner sun, he is attacked by a gryphon, and he falls down on the planet, which is named Nazar. There he wanders about for a short while until he is attacked, this time by an ox. He climbs up into a tree, and to his astonishment the tree can move and talk (this one screamed), and he is taken prisoner by tree-like creatures with up to six arms and faces just below the branches. He is accused of attempted rape on the town clerk's wife, and is put on trial. The case is dismissed and he is set by the Lord of Potu (the utopian state in which he now is located) to learn the language. (Note: "Potu" is the first four letters of "Utopia", backwards.)

Klim quickly learns the language of the Potuans, but this reflects badly on him when the Lord is about to issue him a job, because the Potuans believe that if one perceives a problem at a slow rate, the better it will be understood and solved. But, since he has considerably longer legs than the Potuans, who walk very slowly, he is set to be the Lord's personal courier, delivering letters and suchlike.

During the course of the book, Klim vividly chronicles the culture of the Potuans, their religion, their way of life and the many different countries located on Nazar. After his two-month-long circumnavigation on foot, he is appalled by the fact that men and women are equal and share the same kind of jobs, so he files a suggestion to the Lord of Potu to remove women from higher positions in society. His suggestion is poorly received and he is sentenced to be exiled to the inner rim of the Earth's crust. There he becomes familiar with a country inhabited by sentient monkeys, and after a few years he becomes emperor of the land of Quama, inhabited by the only creatures in the Underworld that look like humans. There, he marries and fathers a son. But again he is driven from hearth and home due to his tyranny and as he escapes he falls into a hole, which carries him through the crust and back up to Bergen again.

There, he is mistaken by the townsfolk to be the Wandering Jew, mostly due to a lingual misunderstanding (he asks a couple of young boys where he is in quamittian, which is Jeru Pikal Salim, and the boys think he is talking about Jerusalem). He learns that he has been away for twelve years, and is taken in by his old friend, mayor Abelin, who writes down everything Klim tells him. He later receives a job as principal of the college of Bergen, and marries.

== English translations ==
1. Anonymous (1742)
2. Anonymous (1828)
3. John Gierlow from the Danish translation (1845)
4. James I. McNelis Jr. (1960)

== Influence ==
- Holberg knew that the satirical content of the novel would cause an uproar in Denmark-Norway, so the book was first published in Germany, in Latin. He thus reached a broader audience than he would have in his homeland. The novel made him widely acclaimed across Europe. Danish, German, French, and Dutch translations were also published in 1741.
- The book is significant in the history of science fiction, being one of the first science-fiction novels in history along with Lucian's (125–180 AD) A True Story, Johannes Kepler's Somnium (The Dream, 1634), Cyrano de Bergerac's Comical History of the States and Empires of the Moon (1656), Margaret Cavendish's The Blazing World (1666), Jonathan Swift's Gulliver's Travels (1726), and Voltaire's Micromégas (1752). Along with a number of those stories, an excerpt was included in the anthology The Road to Science Fiction, Volume 1: From Gilgamesh to Wells.
- The novel was a model for the satirical allegory Improbable Fables, or a Jorney to the Center of the Earth by Russian writer Faddei Bulgarin.
- The work is referenced in Poe's "The Fall of the House of Usher".
- It is one of the first science fiction novels to use the Hollow Earth concept.
- The Danish Communist author and artist Hans Scherfig [1905–1979] created a graphic retelling of "Niels Klims underjordiske rejse", which was originally published in the Danish newspaper Land og folk [Country and people] from 3 July 1955 to 21 January 1956 and later as a book at Sirius Publishing House, Risskov, Denmark in October 1961.
- The story was adapted to a costly 3 episode TV-series for The Danish Broadcasting Corporation in 1984, starring actor Frits Helmuth in the title role.

== Allusions ==
- In one chapter, Klim refers to Pliny the Elder and his Naturalis Historia when he feels that his descriptions of the Underworld inhabitants would seem too incredible for other humans to believe.
- There are a few characters in the book that were actual persons. Niels Klim (died 1690) was employed at Holy Cross Church, a church in downtown Bergen, as bellringer. He was also a retailer of books and a publisher. Klim's friend in the book, Mayor Abelin, was also a real person named Rasmus Christenssen Abelin, and he was mayor of Bergen in Klim's lifetime.
