= The Happy Capsize =

1754 comic play by Ludvig Holberg

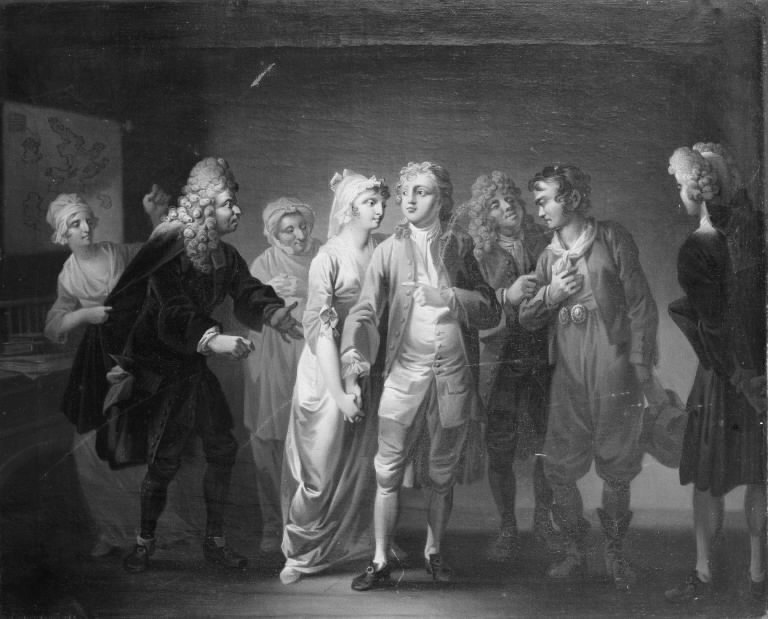
- C. A. Lorentzen: Scene from Act IV, Scene 6.
- Original language: Danish
- Written by: Ludvig Holberg
- Genre: Comedy
- Setting: Denmark

Premiere
- Date: 1754
- Place: Royal Danish Theatre, Copenhagen, Denmark

The Happy Capsize (Danish: Det lykkelige Skibbrud) is a five-set, satirical play by Norwegian-Danish playwright Ludvig Holberg from 1754.

== Production history ==
Det lykkelige Skibbrud premiered at the Royal Danish Theatre on 3 January 1754. It was performed 84 times in the period 1748-1889 and 113 times in the period 1889-1975.
