= The Political Tinker =

1722 comic play by Ludvig Holberg

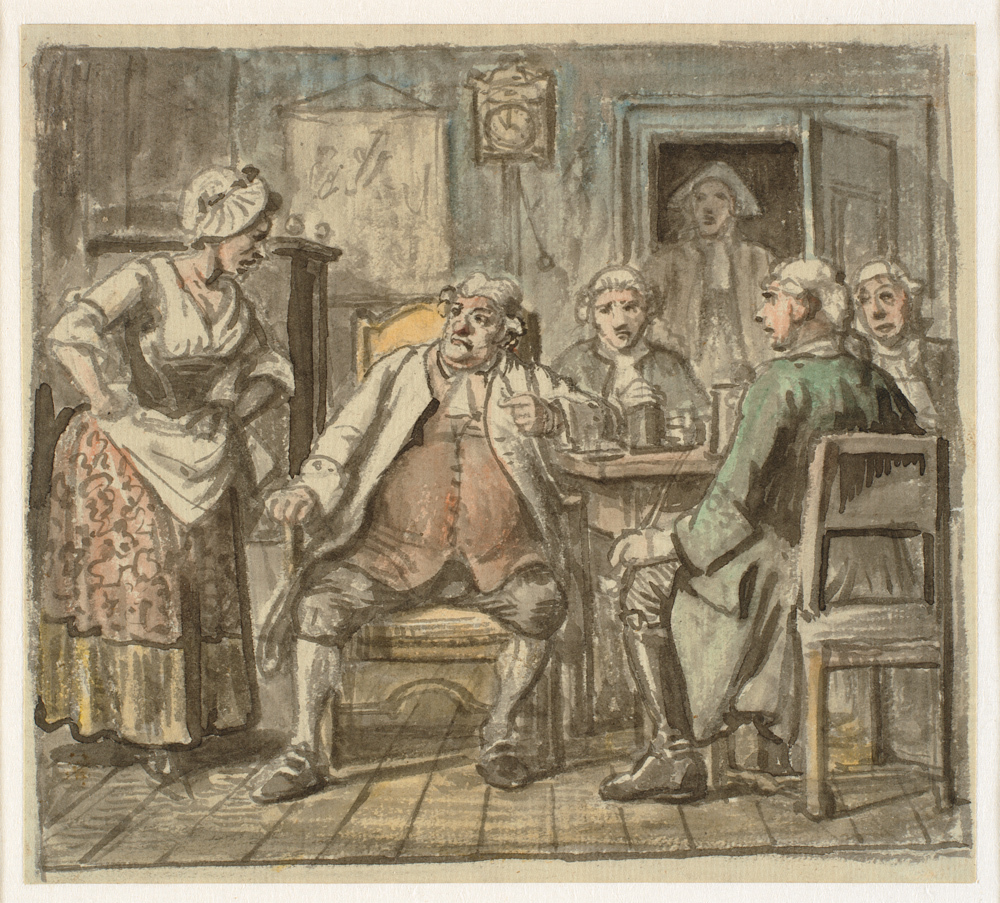
- Wilhelm Marstrand painting of the protagonist's Collegium Politicum
- Original language: Danish
- Written by: Ludvig Holberg
- Genre: Comedy
- Setting: Hamburg

Premiere
- Date: 25 September 1722
- Place: Lille Grønnegade Theatre, Copenhagen, Denmark

The Political Tinker (Danish: Den politiske kandestøber) is a five-set satirical play published by Norwegian-Danish playwright Ludvig Holberg in 1722.

== Production history ==
It premiered at Lille Grønnegade Theatre in Copenhagen on 25 September 1722. It premiere at the Royal Danish Theatre was on 13 February 1750.

== Themes ==
The play was his first comedy. The play theme is from recent political incidents in Hamburg, Germany. Holberg ridicules the political involvement of a group of craftsmen. Some interpreters see a clear anti-democratic tendency in the play, but there is also ambiguity in the way the story of class conflicts and political rebellion is told.

== English translations ==
- Holberg, Ludvig (1885b). The Blue-apron Statesman. Translated by Weber, T. Copenhagen: E. Flensborg. OCLC 19690501.
- —— (1914). Comedies by Holberg: Jeppe of the hill, The Political Tinker, Erasmus Montanus. Translated by Campbell, Oscar James; Schenck, Frederick. New York: The American-Scandinavian Foundation. OCLC 477029781.
- —— (1990). Jeppe of the Hill and Other Comedies. Translated by Argetsinger, Gerald S.; Rossel, Sven Hakon. Carbondale: Southern Illinois University Press. ISBN 978-0-8093-1480-5. OCLC 1156867790.
