= Ludvig Holberg =

Danish–Norwegian writer, philosopher and historian (1684–1754)

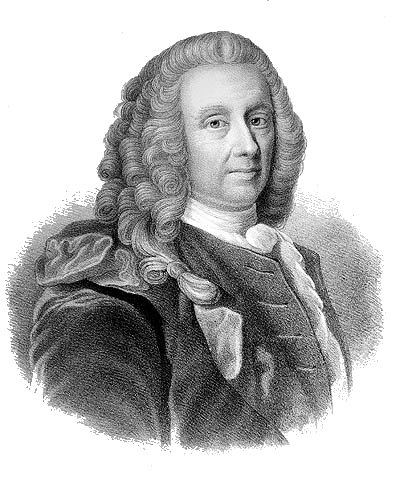
- Born: 3 December 1684; Bergen, Denmark–Norway (now Norway)
- Died: 28 January 1754 (aged 69); Copenhagen, Denmark–Norway (now Denmark)
- Citizenship: Denmark-Norway
- Occupations: Writer; essayist; philosopher; historian; playwright

Signature
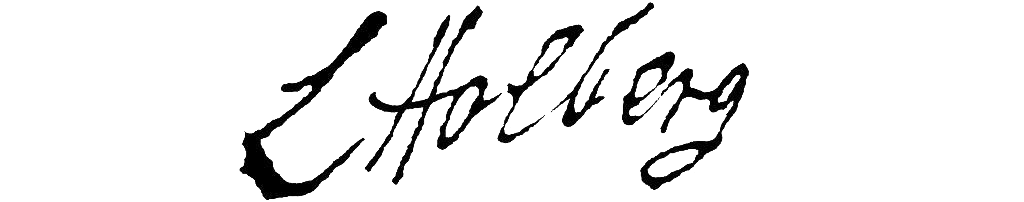

Ludvig Holberg, Baron of Holberg (3 December 1684 – 28 January 1754) was a writer, essayist, philosopher, historian and playwright born in Bergen, Norway, during the time of the Dano–Norwegian dual monarchy. He was influenced by Humanism, the Enlightenment and the Baroque. Holberg is considered the founder of modern Danish and Norwegian literature. He was also a prominent Neo-Latin author, known across Europe for his writing. He is best known for the comedies he wrote in 1722–1723 for the Lille Grønnegade Theatre in Copenhagen. Holberg's works about natural and common law were widely read by many Danish law students over two hundred years, from 1736 to 1936.

== Studies and teaching ==
Holberg was the youngest of six brothers. His father, Christian Nielsen Holberg, died before Ludvig was one year old. He was educated in Copenhagen, and was a teacher at the University of Copenhagen for many years. At the same time, he started his successful career as an author, writing the first of a series of comedies.

He began to study theology at the University of Copenhagen and later taught himself law, history and language. He was not particularly interested in theology as a career, settling for an attestats (similar to a Bachelor's degree today), which gave him the right to work as a priest; he did not attempt a baccalaureus, magister or doctorate in the subject, nor did he follow a career as a theology professor, priest, or bishop. In Holberg's youth, it was common to study theology and specialize according to one's degree, for example in Greek, Latin, philosophy or history. For the purpose of becoming a lawyer, it was normal to study abroad. In 1736 the Danish Lawyer degree was established at the University of Copenhagen, a degree which continued to be granted for 200 years, and for which Holberg's writings remained common reading material throughout this time. Holberg was formally appointed assistant professor after having first worked as one without pay. He had to accept the first available position, which was teaching metaphysics. Later, he became a professor and taught rhetoric and Latin. Finally, he was given a professorship in the subject which he prized most and was most productive in, history.

Holberg was well-educated and well-traveled. In his adolescence, he visited large cities in countries such as the Netherlands and France, and lived for a short period of time in Rome; and for a longer period of time in Oxford, England (1706–1708), which was rare during that time as intellectual life was centered in continental Europe. He was not formally admitted to Oxford University, but spent his time there using the libraries and participating in Latin discussions with the English students.

== Writings ==
Holberg's travels were a main inspiration in his later writings – these experiences matured him both artistically and morally. Holberg let himself be inspired by old Latin comedies and newer French comedies he had seen in Paris, and street theaters in Rome.

His writings can be divided into three periods, during which he produced mainly history, 1711–1718; mainly satirical poetry and stage comedies, 1719–1731; and mainly philosophy, 1731–1750. His rich output of comedies during the middle period was shaped by his role as house dramatist at Denmark's first public theater, opened in Copenhagen in 1721. These comedies are the works on which his fame rests today, and they were an immediate and immense success. However the poverty caused by the Copenhagen Fire of 1728, brought a wave of depression and puritanism upon the nation, which clashed with Holberg's satirical works, and as a consequence in 1731 he gave up his comedies and switched to philosophical and historical writings. Holberg's only novel, the satirical science-fiction/fantasy Niels Klim's Underground Travels, was originally published in Latin in 1741 as Nicolai Klimii Iter Subterraneum.

== Ideology ==
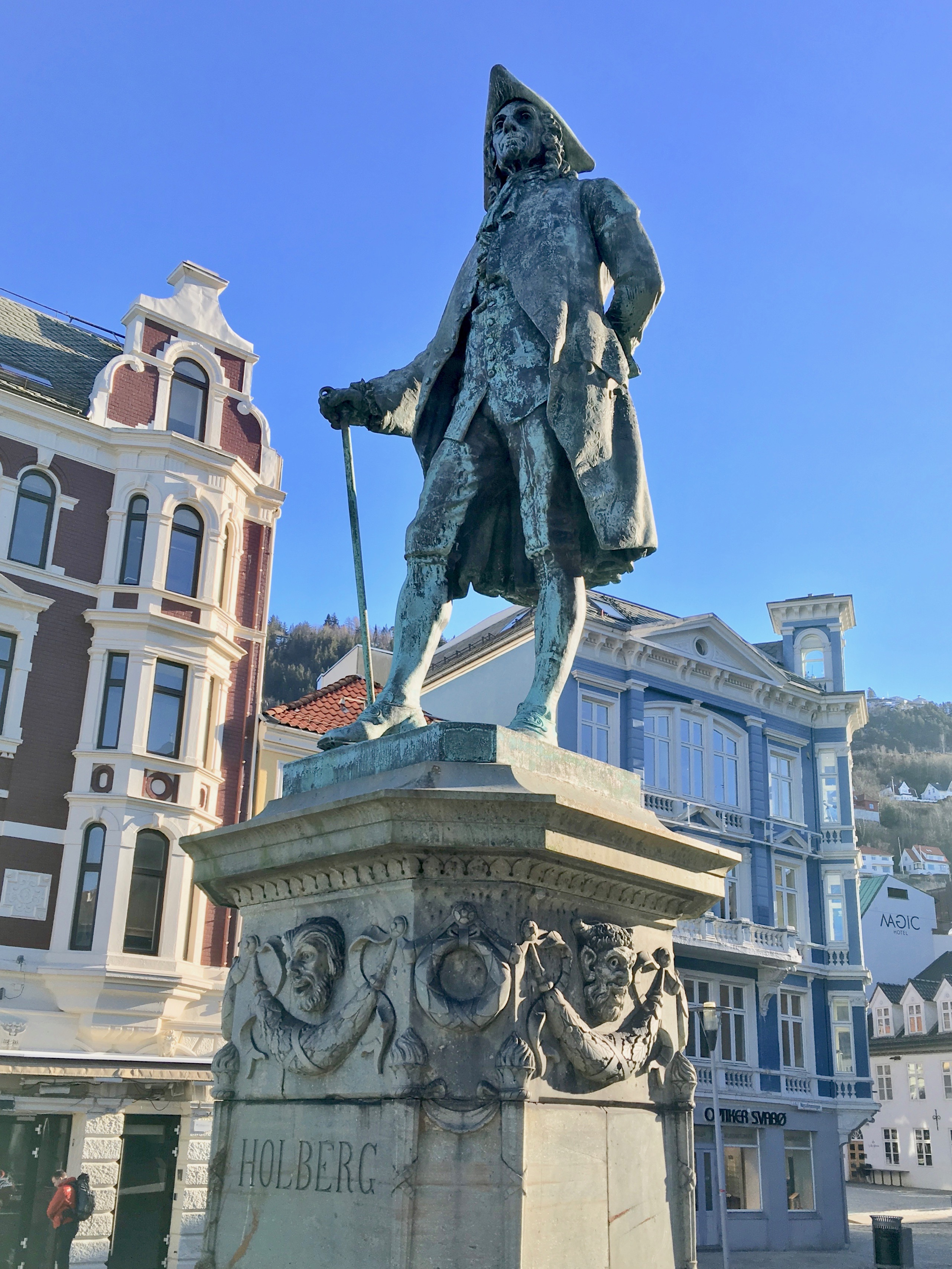
Statue of Holberg in Bergen in 2018

In Paris, Holberg met the Danish-born French scientist Jacob Winsløw, who was Catholic. Winsløw tried to convert Holberg, without success. Holberg enjoyed the debate, but it started a rumor in Copenhagen that Holberg had converted to Catholicism as Winsløw had, and as a consequence he felt it necessary to deny this to the Danish public, giving voice to anti-Catholic views on several occasions.

Holberg believed in people's inner divine light of reason, and to him it was important that the first goal of education was to teach students to use their senses and intellect, instead of uselessly memorising school books. This was a new, modern understanding of the question of religion, and it shows he was a man of the Age of Enlightenment. Holberg was interested in intellect because he felt that this is what binds society together. He also wondered why there was so much evil in the world, especially when one could let reason lead the way. One could say that he distanced himself from a religious explanation of evil towards a rational/empirical train of thought, and this is important because of his status as an author; both in his time and ours.

Holberg was open to biblical criticism, and his religious representation was, for the most part, deism. He was critical of the notion of original sin, instead subscribing to the notion of man's free will.

Holberg's declared intentions with his authorship were to enlighten people to better society. This also fits in with the picture of Holberg as of the Age of Enlightenment. Holberg enjoyed larger cities with deep culture – small cities and nature did not interest him.

Like many scholars of his time, Holberg also influenced science. Holberg's concept for science was that it should be inductive (through experience built on observations) and practical to use. One example is his Betænkning over den nu regierende Qvæg-Syge (Memorandum on the prevalent cattle disease) (1745) where he reasons that the disease is caused by microorganisms.

== Finances ==
=== In youth ===
Holberg had to live a modest life in his youth and early adulthood. He earned a living as a tutor and as a travel companion for noblemen and tried to work as a private sports coach at the university. He received further support from a grant to travel to other universities in other countries, namely Protestant universities, but it was a condition he did not respect since he searched out those places where the discussions were the loudest and the experiences were the largest.

During his stay in England, Holberg set his eyes on academic authoring and on his return, he started writing about history. Later, he wrote also about natural and international law, possibly at the prompting of an older professor who likened him to natural and international law authors such as Hugo Grotius and Samuel Pufendorf.

To make the most possible profit, Holberg published his own works and sold them as papers under a subscription to interested people, either bound or in loose-leaf sheets. Holberg also tried, with some success, a publisher in Norway. There, his book about natural and international law was printed in several editions but did not garner him financial gains.

=== Investments ===
Holberg lived modestly and was able to invest a large part of the profits from the sale of his books on the side and lend them out or invest them in more active ventures. Several times in his writings he criticized townspeople and nobles who used their resources in unproductive ways to be carried round in chairs, to live in lavish houses and waste money on luxury. He ate reasonably and did not use his money on being driven around. He said that his travelling on foot, and continued walking, was the reason he could keep his malaria, which had plagued him in the south, under control.

When he came to the conclusion he could put his money in better ventures than trading, he started investing in real estate. His first large property purchase, Brorupgaard close to Havrebjerg, happened in stages; first he lent money to the owner at that time, and later took over the farm himself.

Some years later, Holberg also purchased Tersløsegaard by Dianalund, the only one of his properties which is preserved because the others in Bergen, Copenhagen and Havrebjerg have been either burned down or torn down.

Sorø Academy and Holberg's will;

Holberg was both unmarried and childless, but in the end of his life had a small fortune. He was interested in leaving a legacy and left his estate to Sorø Academy, which was a royal riding academy, with the goal of creating an institution at a university level for young men coming from nobility. Holberg supported the idea of the academy, worked out suggestions to which academic direction it would take and was asked by the king's superintendent to refer some professors for the school. The influential Enlightenment writer Jens Schielderup Sneedorff was appointed professor at Sorø Academy at Holbergs request.

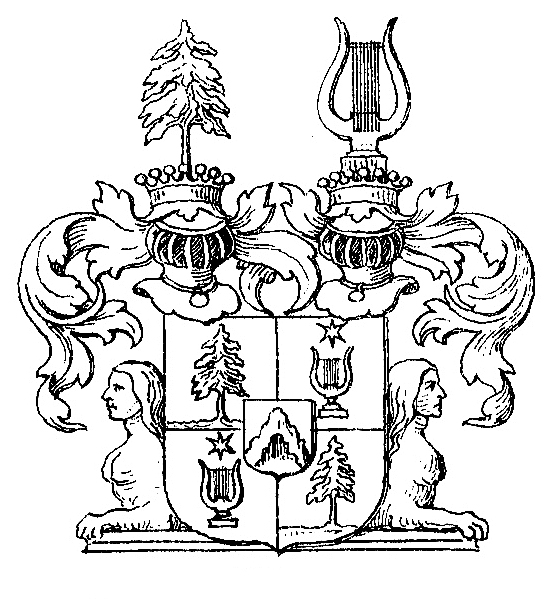
Coat of arms of baron Holberg.

The agreement with the king included that Holberg would be free of taxes from any income from the farms he owned, because the amount donated to the school should be larger than the amount he would pay in taxes. At the same time, he earned the title of Baron of Holberg.

Holberg's casket, a work of Johannes Wiedewelt, can be seen in Sorø Monastery Church.

=== Examples of Holberg's financial management ===
It can be seen from Holberg's correspondence that he was very conservative with money where he thought it would not be of any use; for example, he was against raising the wage of the pedagogues of Havrebjerg.

Holberg commented several times that he was willing to use money if it were put to good use, for example, he would use money on medication and supplies for his farm hands if they suffered from injury or illness.

When academia had large economic difficulties, because funding was very limited, Holberg agreed to help fund the academy (at Sorø Academy) while he was alive.

== Tributes ==
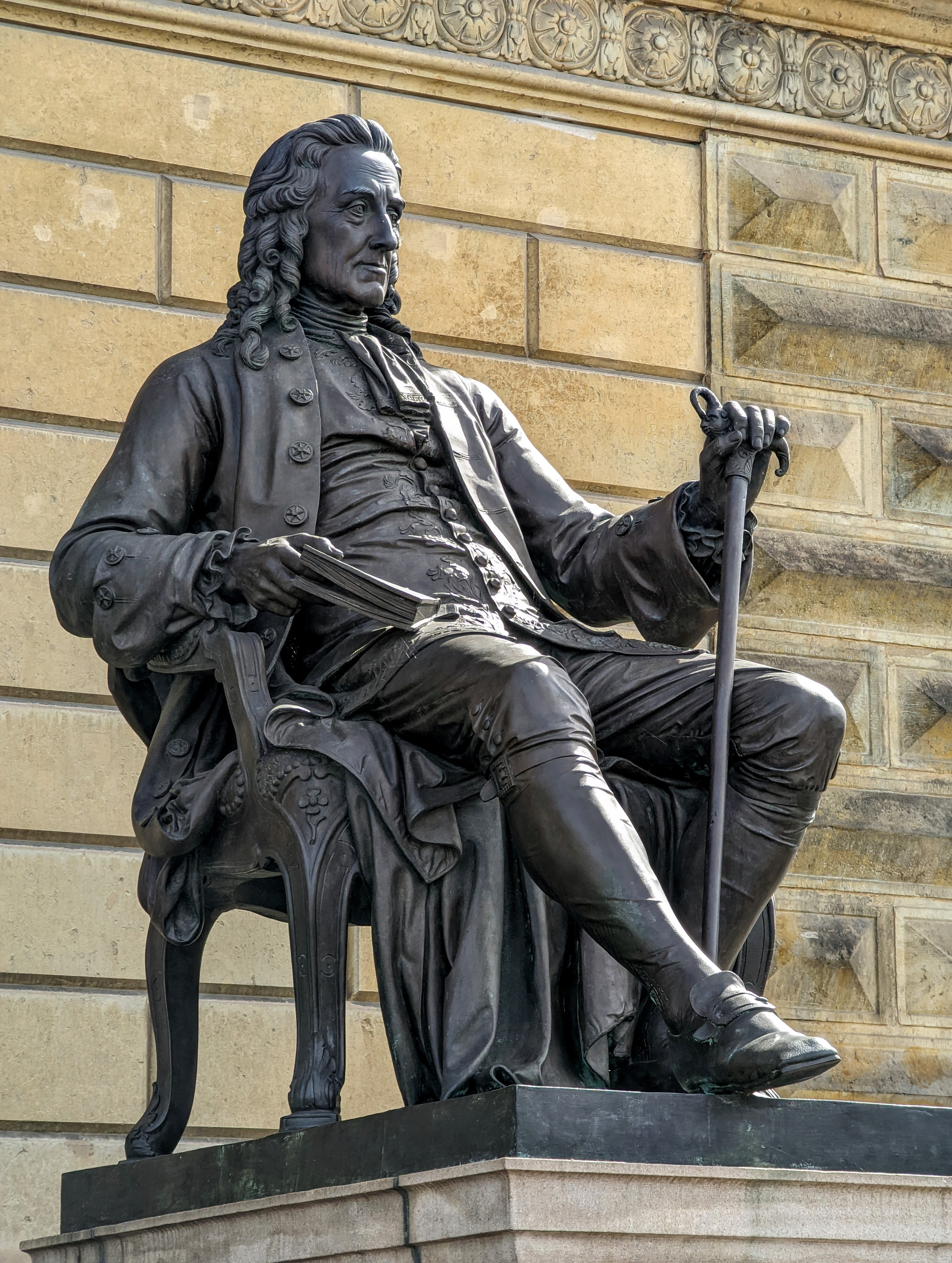
Ludvig Holberg statue in front of the Royal Theater in Copenhagen, by Theobald Stein, 1875

=== Monuments and memorials ===
Holberg is one of the historical figures honoured with a memorial designed by Johannes Wiedewelt in Jægerspris Memorial Park at Hægerspris Castle in Jægerspris, Denmark. A statue of Holberg is one of two statues flanking the main entrance to the Royal Danish Theatre in Copenhagen. The statue is from 1874 and was created by Theobald Stein. A statue by Vilhelm Bissen from 1898 stands in the grounds of Sorø Academu. A statue by John Borjesson from 1884 stands in Bergen.

=== Music ===
Norwegian Edvard Grieg composed the Holberg Suite (opus 40) to honor Holberg. The suite is in the style of country dances from Holberg's time. In 1911 Johan Halvorsen composed incidental music for a production of Holberg's Barselstuen (The Lying-in Room) in Oslo. Halvorsen later arranged the music into his Suite Ancienne op. 31, which he dedicated to the memory of Holberg.

Dan Shore's opera The Beautiful Bridegroom, for six sopranos is based on Holberg's last play, Den forvandlede Brudgom.

=== Medals and awards ===
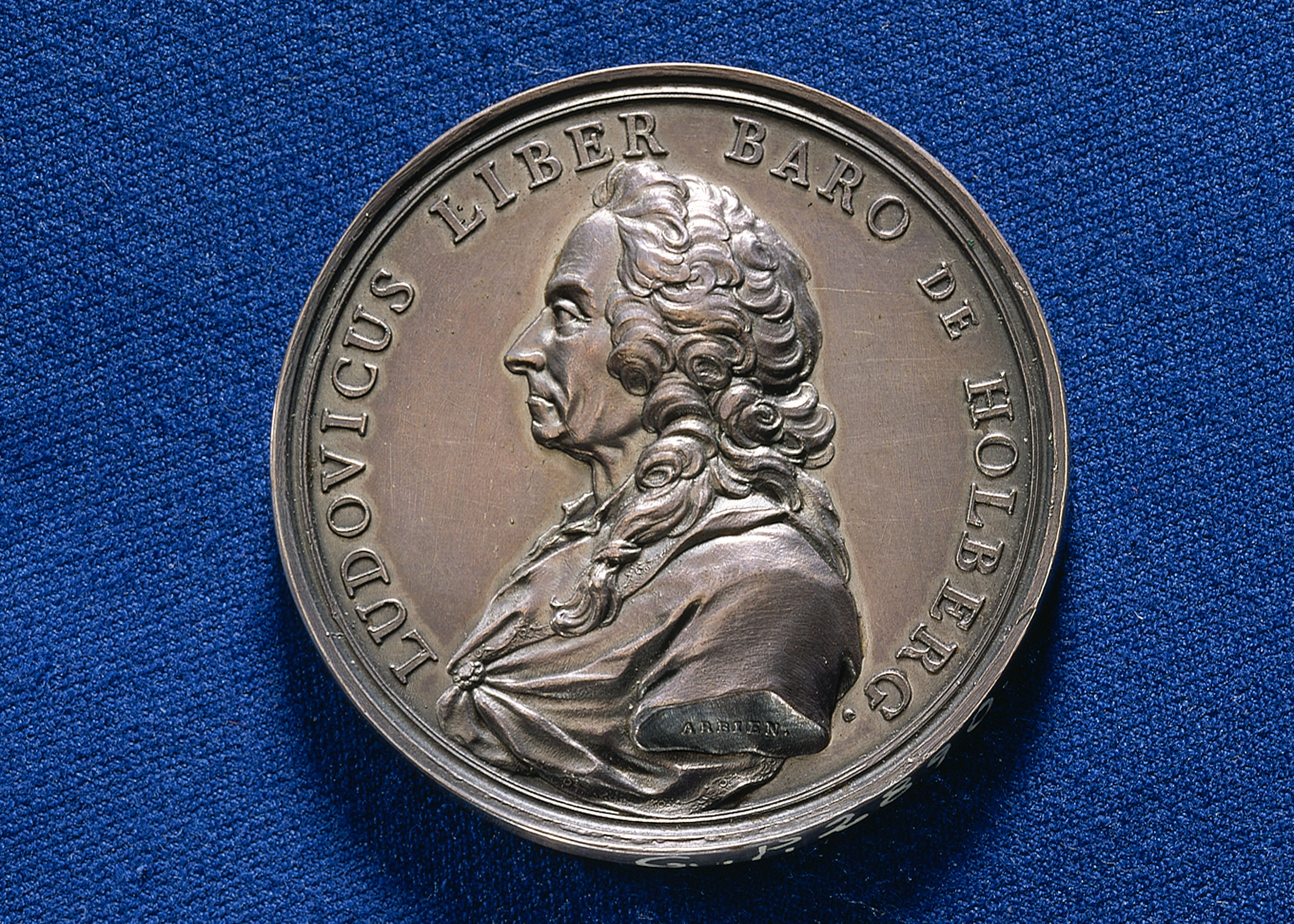
Commemorative medal created by Magnus August Arbien.

A medal to Ludvig Holberg was created by Magnus August Arbien in the 1750s.

The Holberg Medal is the finest literary distinction of the Danish Authors' Society. It has been awarded since 1924. The Norwegian University of Bergen awards the Holberg International Memorial Prize. The 4.5 million kroner (ca. €520,000) endowed prize was awarded to Julia Kristeva in 2004, to Jürgen Habermas in 2005, and to Shmuel Eisenstadt in 2006.

=== Toponymy ===
The street Holbergsgade in the Gammelholm neighbourhood of central Copenhagen was named after Holberg in the 1860s. The boulevard Holbergsallmenningen ub central Bergen is also named after Holberg. Streets named after Holberg are also found in many other Danish and Norwegian towns, including Sorø(Dianalund (Holbergsvej), Kolding (Holbergsvej), Aarhus (Holbergsgade) and Aalborg (Holbergsgade).

There is a town named after Holberg on northern Vancouver Island, British Columbia, Canada. It was founded by Danish immigrants in 1907. A crater on Mercury is named for him.

== Written works ==
=== Comedies ===
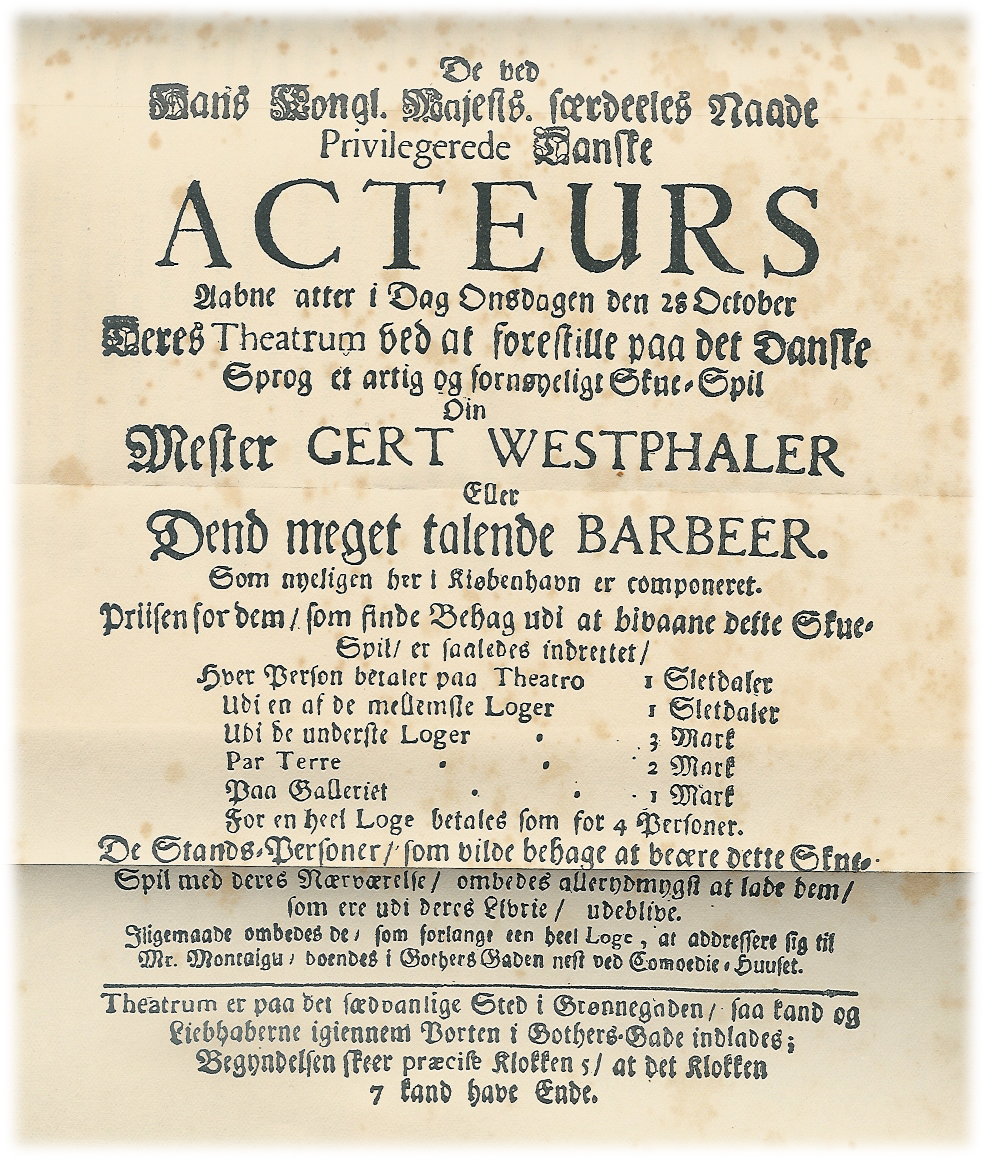
The oldest extant theater poster for one of Holberg's plays, Mester Gert Westphaler, 1722

- Den Politiske Kandestøber, 1722 (Eng. The Political Tinker / The Pewterer turned Politician)
- Den vægelsindede, 1722 (Eng. The Waverer / The Weathercock)
- Jean de France eller Hans Frandsen, 1722 (Eng. Jean de France)
- Jeppe på bjerget eller den forvandlede Bonde, 1722 (Eng. Jeppe of the Hill, or The Transformed Peasant)
- Mester Gert Westphaler, 1722 (Eng. Gert Westphaler)
- Barselstuen, 1723 (Eng. The Lying-in Room)
- Den ellefte Junii, 1723 (Eng. The Eleventh of June)
- Jacob von Tyboe eller den stortalende Soldat, 1723 (Eng. Jacob von Tyboe, or The Bragging Soldier)
- Ulysses von Ithacia, 1723 (Eng. Ulysses of Ithaca)
- Erasmus Montanus eller Rasmus Berg, 1723 (Eng. Erasmus Montanus or Rasmus Berg)
- Don Ranudo de Colibrados, 1723
- Uden Hoved og Hale, 1723 (Eng. Without Head or Tail)
- Den Stundesløse, 1723 (Eng. The Fidget)
- Hexerie eller Blind Allarm, 1723 (Eng. Witchcraft or False Alert)
- Melampe, 1723
- Det lykkelige Skibbrud, 1724 (Eng. The Happy Capsize)
- Det Arabiske Pulver, 1724 (Eng. The Arabian Powder)
- Mascarade, 1724 (Eng. Masquerade)
- Julestuen, 1724 (Eng. The Christmas Party)
- De Usynlige, 1724 (Eng. The Invisible / The Masked Ladies)
- Diderich Menschenskraek, 1724 (Eng. Diderich the Terrible)
- Kildereisen, 1725 (Eng. The journey to the source / The source Journey)
- Henrich og Pernille, 1724–1726 (Eng. Henrik and Pernille)
- Den pantsatte Bondedreng, 1726 (Eng. The Pawned Farmers helper / The Peasant in Pawn)
- Pernilles korte Frøkenstand, 1727 (Eng. Pernille's Brief Experience as a Lady)
- Den Danske Comoedies Liigbegængelse, 1727 (Eng. Funeral of Danish Comedy)
- Den honette Ambition, 1731 (Eng. The honest/honourable ambition)
- Den Forvandlede Brudgom, 1753 (Eng. The Changed Bridegroom)
- Plutus eller Proces imellom Fattigdom og Riigdom, publ. 1753
- Husspøgelse eller Abracadabra, publ. 1753 (Eng. The house's Ghost or Abracadabra)
- Philosophus udi egen Indbildning, publ. 1754
- Republiqven eller det gemeene Bedste, publ. 1754
- Sganarels Rejse til det philosophiske Land, publ. 1754 (Eng. Sganarel's Journey to the Land of the Philosophers)

=== Poems ===
- Peder Paars, 1720
- fire Skæmtedigte, 1722 (Eng. Four poems for fun)
- Metamorphosis eller Forvandlinger, 1726 (Eng. Metamorphosis or Changes)

=== Novels ===
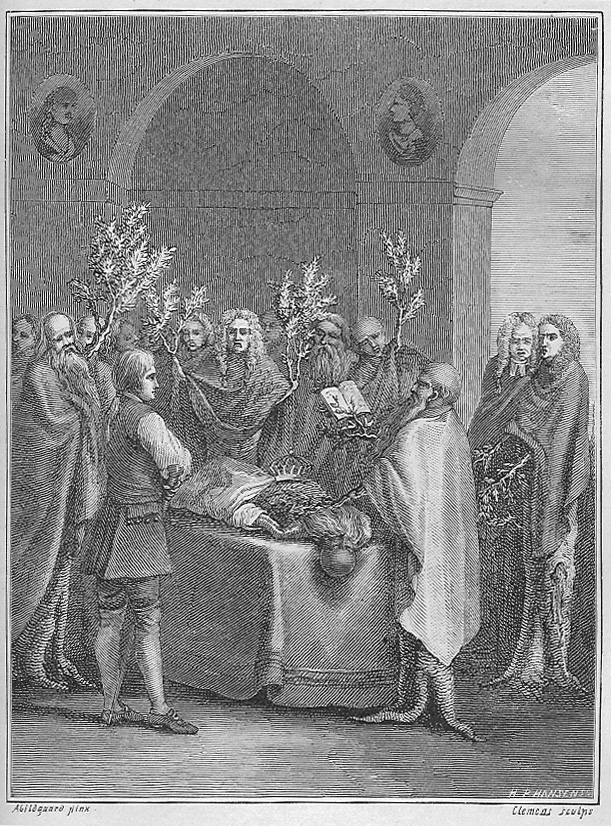
Illustration from the luxurious 1789 edition of Niels Klims underjordiske Rejse. Etching by Johan Frederik Clemens after drawing by Nicolai Abraham Abildgaard.

- Nicolai Klimii iter subterraneum, 1741. (Translated to Danish by Hans Hagerup in 1742 as Niels Klims underjordiske Rejse.) (Eng. Niels Klim's Underground Travels or Nicolai Klimii's subterranean Journey or The Journey of Niels Klim to the World Underground Bison Books, 2004. ISBN 0-8032-7348-7)

=== Essays ===
- Moralske Tanker, 1744 (Eng. Moral thoughts)
- Epistler, 1748–54
- Moralske Fabler, 1751 (Eng. Moral Fables)
- Tre latinske levnedsbreve, 1728–1743

=== Historical works ===
- Introduction til de fornemste Europæiske Rigers Historier, 1711 (Eng. Introduction to the Greatest European Empires Histories)
- Morals Kierne eller Introduction til Naturens og Folke-Rettens Kundskab, 1716 (Eng. The Core of Morality or Introduction to Natural and International Law)
- Dannemarks og Norges Beskrivelse, 1729 (Eng. Denmark's and Norway's Description)
- Dannemarks Riges Historie, 1732–35 (Eng. The Danish Empire/Kingdom's History)
- Den berømmelige Norske Handel-Stad Bergens Beskrivelse, 1737 (Eng. The Famous Norwegian Commercial Hub Bergen's Description)
- Almindelig Kirke-Historie, 1738 (Eng. General Church History)
- Den jødiske Historie fra Verdens Begyndelse, fortsat til disse Tider, 1742 (Eng. The Jewish History From the Beginning of the World, Continued till Present Day/These Times)
- Adskillige store Heltes og berømmelige Mænds sammenlignede Historier, 1739–53 (Eng. Several Great Heroes' and Famous Men's Compared Histories)
- Adskillige Heltinders og navnkundige Damers sammenlignede Historier, 1745 (Eng. Several Heroines' and Noteworthy Ladies' Compared Histories)

=== Memoir ===
- Memoirs of Lewis Holberg, 1737 (published in English, 1827)

== See also ==
- Christian Gotlob Mengel
