= Marstrand (surname) =

Marstrand is a surname. Notable people with the surname include:

- Jacob Marstrand (1848–1935), Danish master baker and politician
- Julie Marstrand (1882–1943), Danish sculptor
- Kesang Marstrand (born 1981), American folk singer, songwriter, and guitarist
- Margrethe Marstrand (1874–1948), Danish teacher and writer
- Nicolai Jacob Marstrand (1770–1829), Danish mechanician and inventor
- Troels Marstrand (1815–1889), Danish industrialist
- Wilhelm Marstrand (1810–1873), Danish painter and illustrator
