= Frederik Fabritius (1683–1755) =

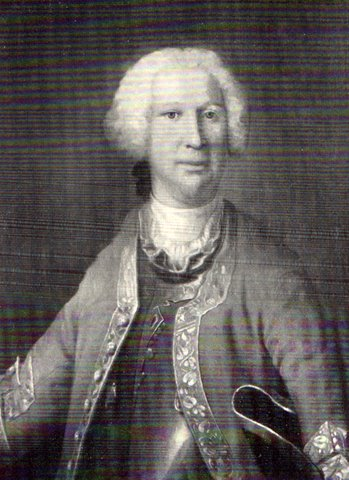
Frederik Fabritius

Frederik Fabritius (16 November 1683 – 12 February 1755) was a Danish goldsmith who served as court goldsmith to Christian VI. He also served as one of Copenhagen's 32 Men and later the city's stadshaupmand. He owned a large property at the corner of Købmagergade and Silkegade (where Købmagerhus stands today). He was the father of goldsmith Christopher Fabritius.

== Early life and education ==
Fabritius was born in Copenhagen on 16 November 1683, the son of master goldsmith Christopher Frederiksen Fabritius, and Kirsten Hendriksdatter Svidtzer. His father was granted citizenship as a goldsmith in 1682 and served as alderman of the Goldsmiths' Guilding from 1686. Frederik Fabritius completed an apprenticeship as a goldsmith in Jodochus Genrich Mundt's workshop.

== Career ==
On 12 November 1708, Fanritius was granted citizenship as a master goldsmith. In 1712, he bought the property at Købmagergade No. 8. After the Copenhagen Fire of 1728, he also bought the adjacent corner property and constructed a substantial building complex on the site. In 1820, he was appointed court goldsmith to Christian VI. in 1831, he created a new crown for the queen. On 23 February 1733, he was appointed as alderman of the Goldsmiths' Guild in Copenhagen.

== Other activities ==
In 1725, Fabritius was elected as one of Copenhagen's 32 Men. He was also active in the Civilian Guard where he served as captain of Købmager Quarter. On 16 January 1731, he succeeded Michael Fheldsted as stadshaupmand.

== Personal life ==
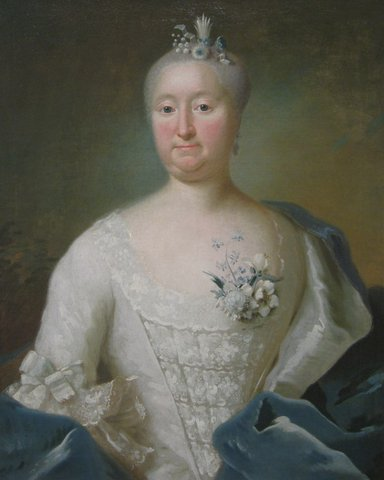
Ursula Christiana Linde (1721–1789)

Fabritius married twice, first to his cousin Cathrine Elisabeth Mundt and then to Ursula Christiana Linde. He was the dather of six children. His eldest son Christopher Fabritius continued his workshop.

Frederik Fabritius died on 16 January 1755 in his home on Købmagergade. He was buried in St. Nicolas' Church.
