= Christopher Fabritius =

Danish court goldsmith

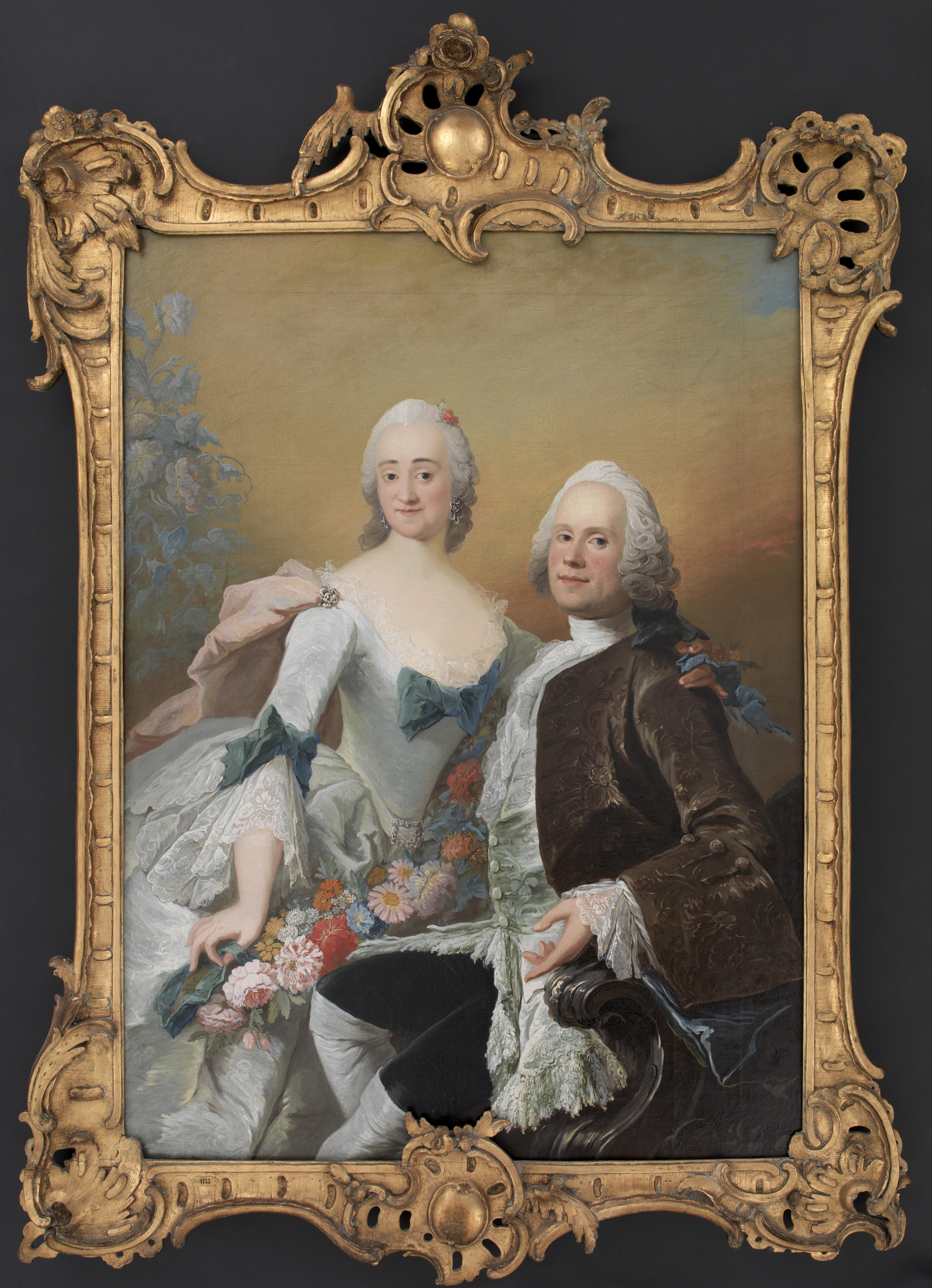
Christopher and Gundel Fabritius, painted by Peder Als

Christopher Fabritius (27 August 1710 – 23 January 1787) was a Danish court goldsmith.

== Early life and education ==
Fabritius was born on 27 August 1710 in Copenhagen, the son of master goldsmith Frederik Fabricius and Cathrine Elisabeth Mundt. His father was appointed court goldsmith to Christian VI in 1720. He owned a property at the corner of Købmagergade and Silkegade (where Købmagerhus stands today). Christopher Fabritius completed his apprenticeship in his father's workshop in c. 1730. In 1731, he worked on the queen's crown. In autumn 1732, he embarked on a long journey to Germany, Netherlands, England, France and Italy.

== Career ==
On 8 April 1737, Fabritius was granted citizenship as a goldsmith in Copenhagen. From 1841, when his father was appointed stadshaupmand, Fabritius served as the de facto leader of the father's workshop. In 1746, he succeeded his father as court goldsmith. In 1749, he was also appointed coin-and-city-guardian (mønt- og stadsguardein). In 1761, he resigned from the post as coin guardian.

== Personal life ==
In 1739, Fabritius married to Gundel Mette Kristine Berntz. She was the daughter of textile merchant and councilman David Johan Berntz and Anne Elisabeth Børgesdatter. She gave birth to five children. The family's first home was on Vimmelskaftet. He later took over his father's property on Købmagergade. Copenhagen's first gentleman's club was based in his building from around 1772. It was known as Fabricius' Club after him.

Fabritius died on 23 January 1787 and was buried in the family's burial chapel in St. Bicholas' Church. His workshop was continued by the eldest son Frederik Fabritius.
