= Lille Købmagerhus =

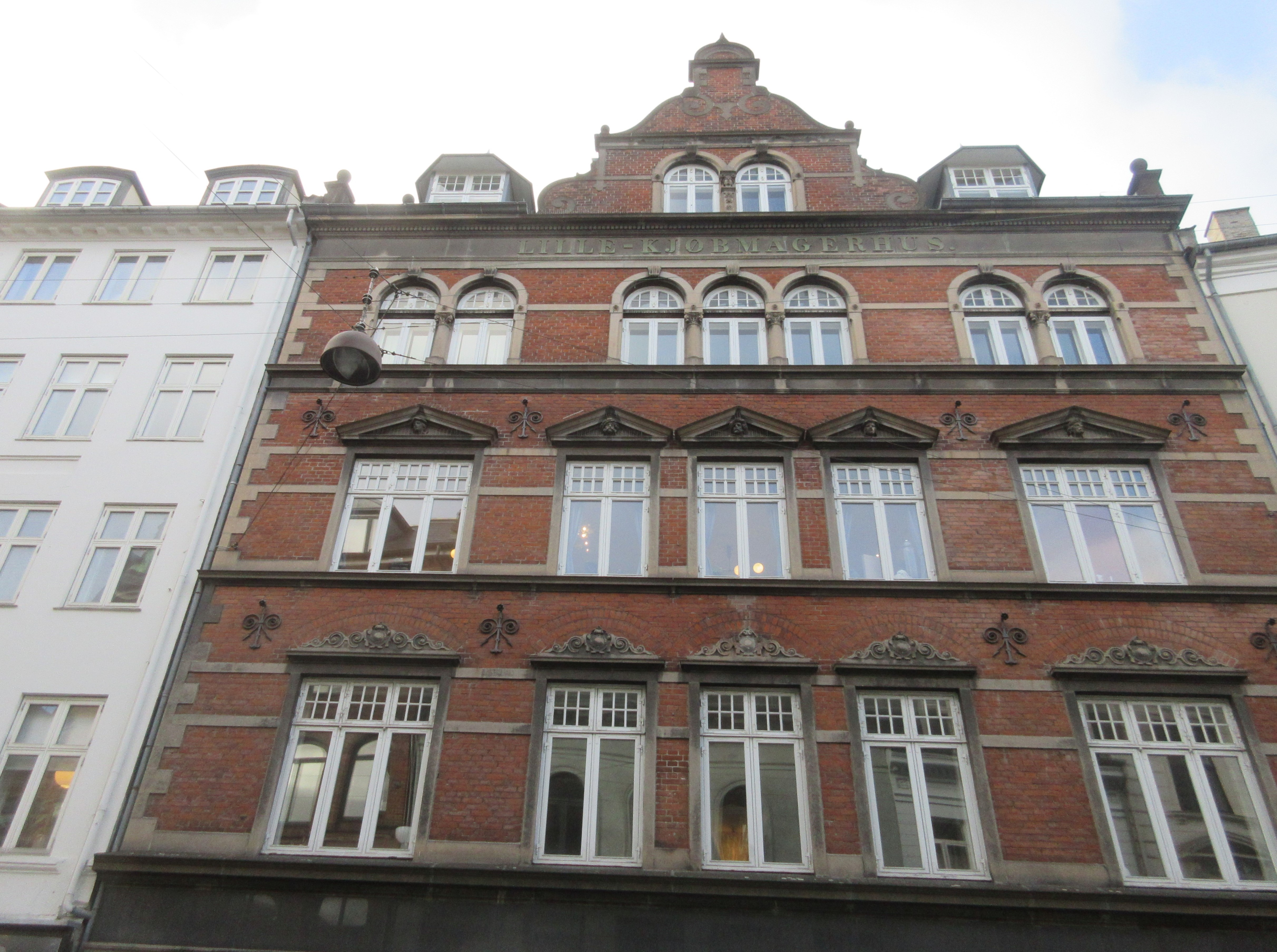
- Interactive map of Lille Købmagerhus

General information
- Architectural style: Renaissance Revival
- Location: Copenhagen, Denmark
- Coordinates: 55°40′53.5″N 12°34′29.2″E
- Completed: 1900

Lille Købmagerhus is a Renaissance Revival style building situated on Købmagergade (No. 55) in Copenhagen, Denmark. It was constructed in c. 1800 for coffee retailer Christian P. Hansen to designs by architect A. B. C. von Düben. The inclusion of "Lille" (English: Little) in its name distinguishes it from the slightly older and somewhat larger Købmagerhus further down the street (No. 22). Peder Hvitfeldts Stræde 4, a three-storey building from 1812 on the other side of the block, is also part of the property. Notable former residents of Peder Hvidtfeldts Stræde 4 include the philosopher Frederik Christian Sibbern, botanist and politician Joakim Frederik Schouw and architect Peter Kornerup. The property is today owned by Kirkebi A/S.

== History ==
=== 18th century ===
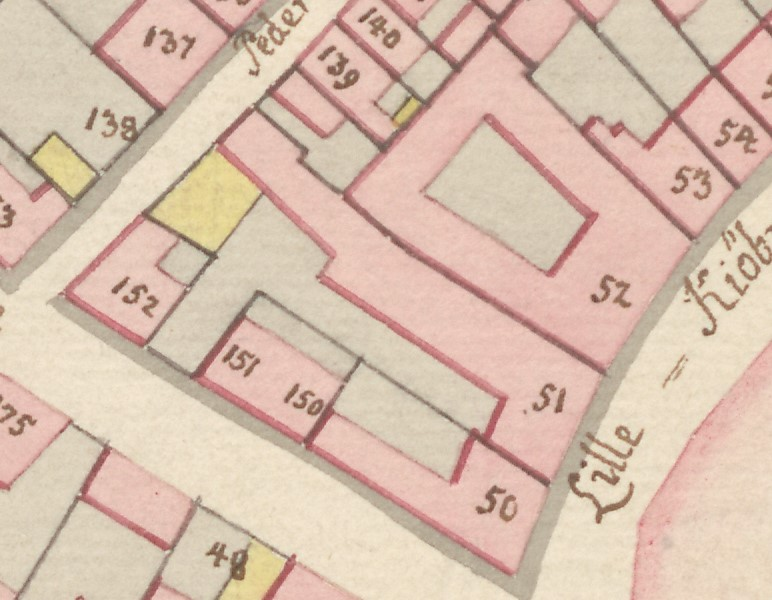
No. 51 seen in a detail from Christian Gedde's map of Klædebo Quarter, 1757

In the 17th century, the site was made up of two properties, one facing Købmagergade and another facing Peder Hvitfeltsgade on the other side of the street. The property on Købmagergade was listed in Copenhagen's first cadastre of 1689 as No. 47 in Klædebo Quarter, owned by Isak Jacobsen. On his death, his widow was married to army captain (in the Funen National Regiment) Jacob Lerche. On his death, she was married to brewer Oeder Nielsen. The property on Peder Hvitfeltsgade was listed as No. 162, owned by fish-soaker (fiskebløder) Børge Olsen Yorp. In 1691, it was sold to quartermaster in HDMS Svenske Falk asmus Knudsen Sandvig. The property was later acquired by mathematical instrument maker arl von Mander. On 15 June 1699, he sold it to Nicolai Lork. On 20 October 1728, it belonged to the widow of kammerjunker Elias Hübsch.

The two properties were later merged. The property was listed in the new cadastre of 756 as No. 51 in Klædebo Quarter, owned by brewer Jens Kofoed.

=== Mariager family ===
The property was later acquired by Peder Mariager. He was active as both a brewer and a cooper. His property was home to three households at the 1787 census. Mariager resided in the building with his second wife Gundel Bunsin, his son Christian Mariager, two coopers (employees), four cooper's apprentices, two maids, four brewery workers and the lodger Christian Stege (student). Jens Jensen, a sailing master (sturmand), resided in the building with his wife Lovise Jensen, their two-year-old daughter Kirstine and one maid. Olfert Fischer, then a naval captain, resided in the builduing with his six sisters, one male servant and one maid.

The property was listed in the new cadastre of 1806 as No. 78 in Klædebo Quarter. It belonged to brewer and cooper Christian Mariager at that time. In 1811, No. 78 was divided into No. 78 A and No. 78B.

=== No. 78A, 1811–1898 ===
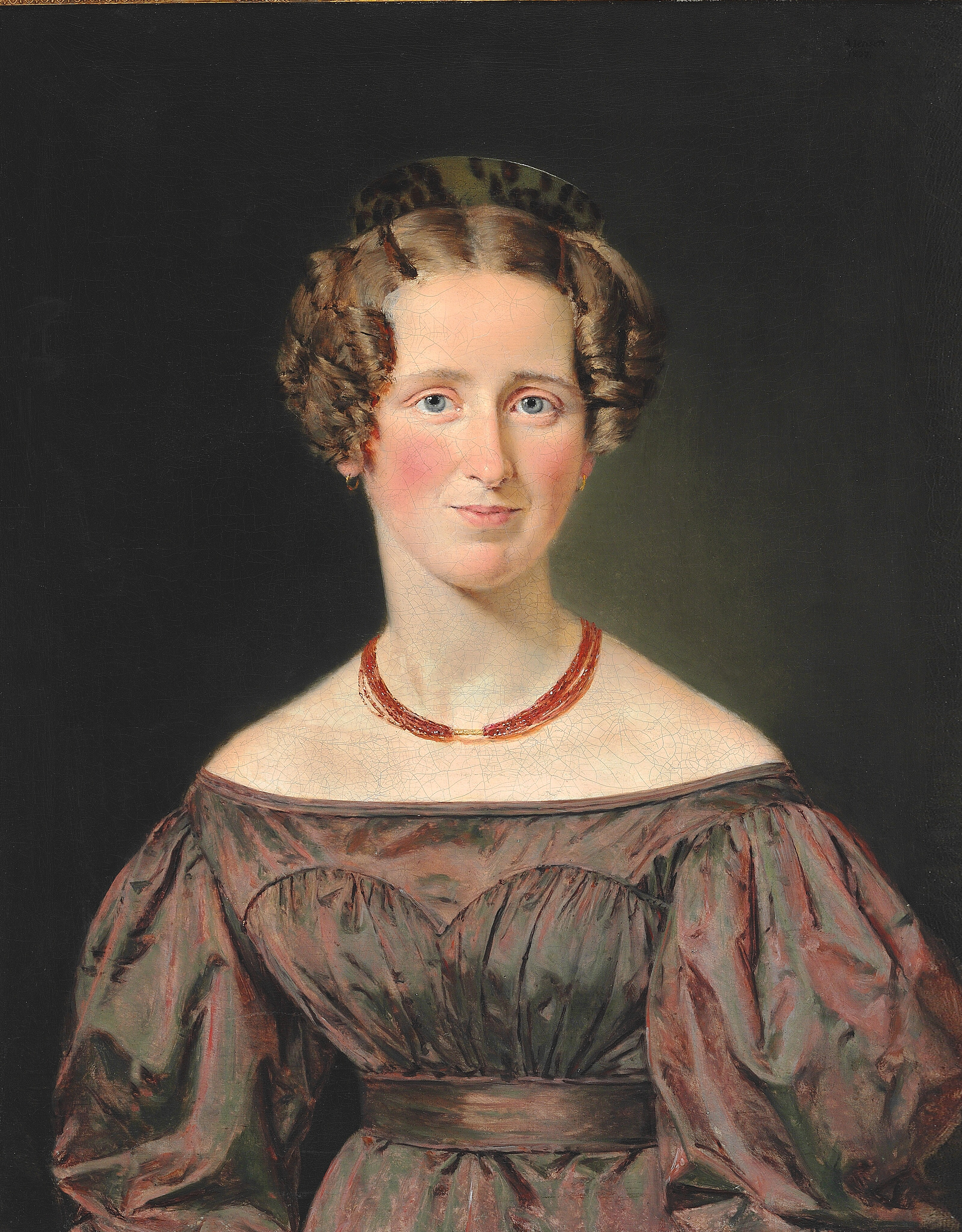
Signe Marie Vilhelmine Jensen

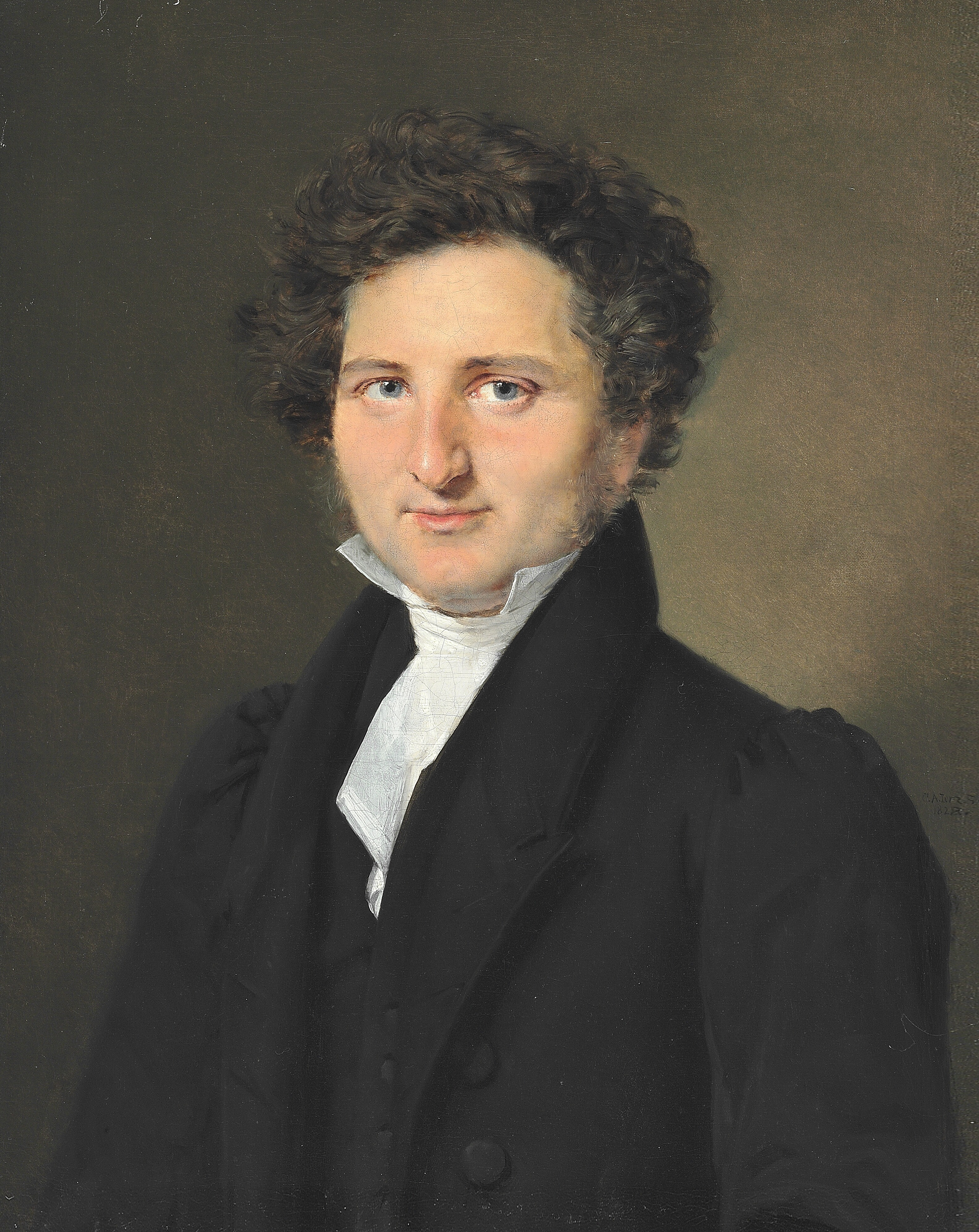
Johan Laurentz Jensen

No. 78A was home to four households at the 1840 census. Hans Madsen, a coachmaker, resided on the ground floor with his son August Madsen (also a coachmaker), engineer August Colding, a maid and the saddler's apprentice Joachim Greif. Johan Laurentz Jensen, a flower painter, resided on the first floor with his wife Signe Marie Wilhelmine Jensen (née Visby) and one maid. Frederikke Marie Elisabeth Flindt (née Benzon, 1769–1858), widow of General War Commissioner Casper Christopher Flindt (1744–1802), resided on the second floor with overkrigskommissær Nicolai Johannes Bloch and one maid. Christen Jørgensen Heinsvig, a junk dealer, resided in the basement with his wife Ane Bolette født Pinvig, their 12-year-old daughter and one maid.

The property was home to 24 residents in four households at the 1850 census. Frederikke Marie Elisabeth Flindt still resided on the second floor with Bloch, husjomfru Emma Victorine Wiberg and one maid. Julie von Hoppe (née Haffner, 1800–1853), widow of county governor in Vejle jeldsted Hoppe (1794–1848), resided on the first floor with her three children (aged 13 to 23), a seemstress and a maid. August Frederik Madsen still resided on the ground floor. He lived there with his wife Elisabeth Birgitte (née Jørgensen), three children and two maids. Hans Andreasen, a barkeeper, resided in the basement with his wife Enge Andreasen (née Pedersdatter) and their five children (aged zero to 17).

One of August Frederik Madsen's sons was the actor Axel Madsen.

When house numbering by street was introduced in 1859, as a supplement to the old cadastral numbers by street, No. 78A was listed as Købmagergade 55.

The property was home to 25 residents at the 1860 census. Joachim Christian Gylling, a grocer (urtekræmmer), resided on the ground floor and in the basement with his wife Emma Caroline (née Ostenfeldt), his mother-in-law Juliane Wilhelmine Ostenfeldt (née Hagedorn), an eight-year-old foster son, two maids, a grocer (employee), a grocer's apprentice and two caretakers. Ferdinand Wolff (1814–1893), a consul, resided on the first floor with his wife Hildegarde "Hilde" Augusta Henrietta (née Kühl, 1820–1874), their three children (aged three to seven), a female cook, a maid (husjomfru) and a nanny. Carl Theodor Emil Schou, a military physician, resided on the second floor with his wife Emilie Christine (née Jacobsen), their two children (aged three and five) and two maids.

=== No. 78B, 1811–1898 ===
The present building on the site was constructed in 1811–1912 for L. Paulsen.

Frederik Christian Sibbern (1785–1872), who had just been appointed an extraordinary professor in philosophy at the University of Copenhagen, resided in one of the apartments in 1814–1815 and again in 1817.

The scientist and politician Joakim Frederik Schouw (1789–1852) was among the residents in 1831–1833.

Frantz Terkil Beistrup, a silk dyer who was also renting out mascarade constumes, resided on the ground floor with his wife Frederikke Wilhelime Weinholdt, their two daughters (aged 12 and 18), a nine-year-old nephew and a maid. Peter Kornerup, an architect and royal building inspector, resided on the first floor with his wife Sophie Dorthea Borch, their four children (aged three to eight) and two maids. Gottlieb Nicolai Sibbern, a master mason and captain, resided on the second floor with his wife Grethe (née Friis), his wife's nephew Peter Julius Friis (aged 17), his own nieces Charlotte (aged 17) and Grethe (aged 14), his accountant, one male servant, and two maids.

When house numbering was introduced in 1859, No. 67B was listed as Peder Hvitfeldts Stræde 4.

The property was again home to three households at the 1850 census. Heinriette Courlander, a widow with means, resided on the ground floor with three unmarried children (aged 29 to 36) and one maid. Peter Emil Kornerup still resided on the first floor with his wife, their four children and two maids. Gottlieb Nicolai Sibbern still resided on the second floor with his wife, his wife's nephew, her niece and two maids.

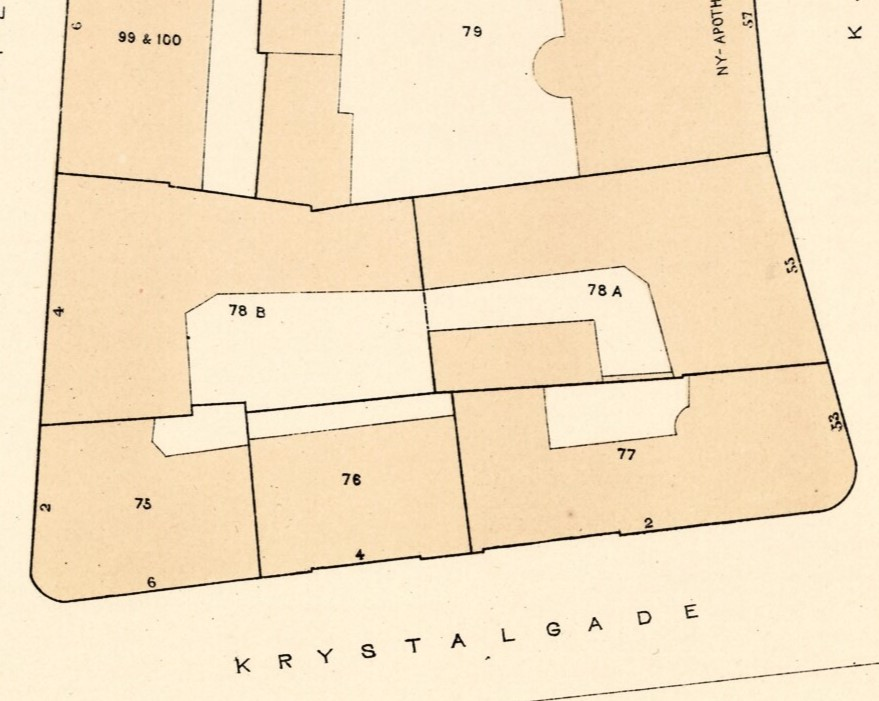
The property seen in a detail from one of Berggreen's block plans of Klædebo Quarter, 1886–88

The property was home to 21 residents in four households at the 1860 census. Peter Kornerup still resided on the first floor with his wife, their three children and two maids. Ane Frederikke Kornerup (née Møller, 1775–1867), his mother, resided on the ground floor with two of her children (aged 43 and 57) and a maid. Margrethe Henriette Vilhelmine Sibbern (née Friis), Sibberen's widow, resided on the second floor with her foster daughter Margrethe Charlotte Friis and one maid. Hans Rasmussen, a workman, resided in the side wing with his wife Dorthea Rasmussen, their two children (aged one to three), workman Lars Henriksen and two lodgers (sisters).

The property was home to 11 residents at the 1880 census. Nikolai Valdemar Mohr Kornerup, an office manager (kontorchef), resided on the second floor with a housekeeper (husjomfru) and a maid. Valdemar Bressendorff, a businessman (grosserer), resided on the first floor with his wife Thora Bressendorff, their 34-year-old daughter Christiane Bressendorff, and his niece Lorence Emilie Bagger. Henriette Sofie Frandsen, an assistant manager, resided on the second floor of the side wing with the teacher Charlotte Emilie Frandsen and clerk Camilla Nathalie Frandsen. Carl August Vilhelm Strømbom, a goldsmith, resided on the first floor of the side wing.

=== 20th century ===
In 1898, No. 89A and No. 78N was again merged into a single property. The present building on Købmagergade was constructed in around 1900 for coffee retailer Christian P. Hansen (1844–1904). It was designed by A. B. C. von Düben.

Christian P. Hansen's tea-and-coffee shop was located on the ground floor of the building. The company had been founded by him on 2 November 1867. It was continued by his son Knud Hansen (b. 1877) under the name Chr. P Hansen's Eftf. (Chr. P. Hansen's Successor) until at least 1950. It was still located in the building at that time.

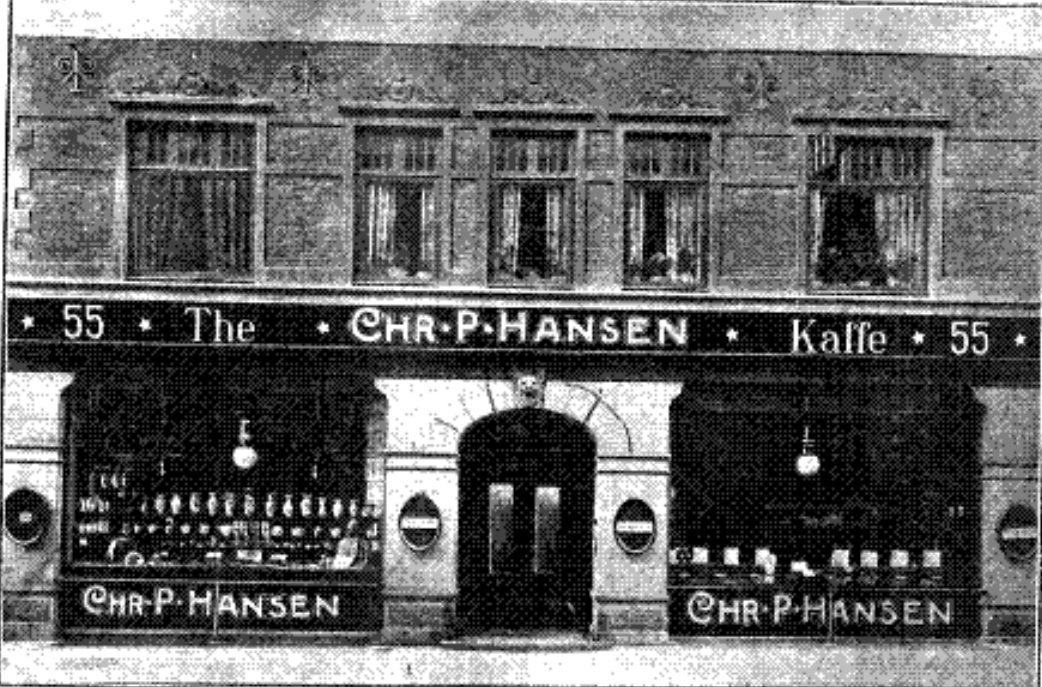
Chr. P. Hansen

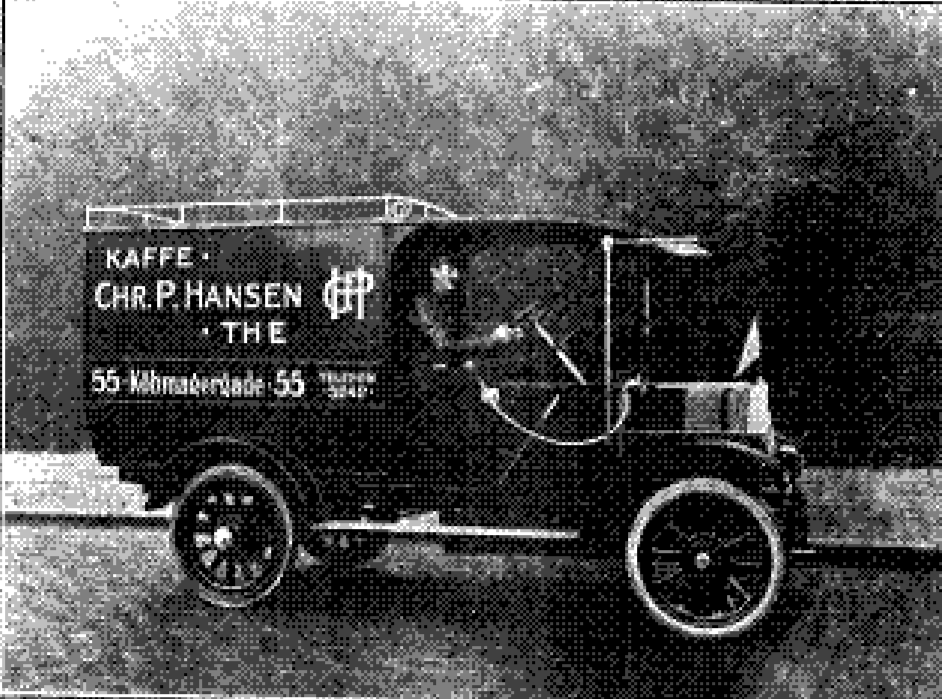
One of Chr. P. Hansen's cars

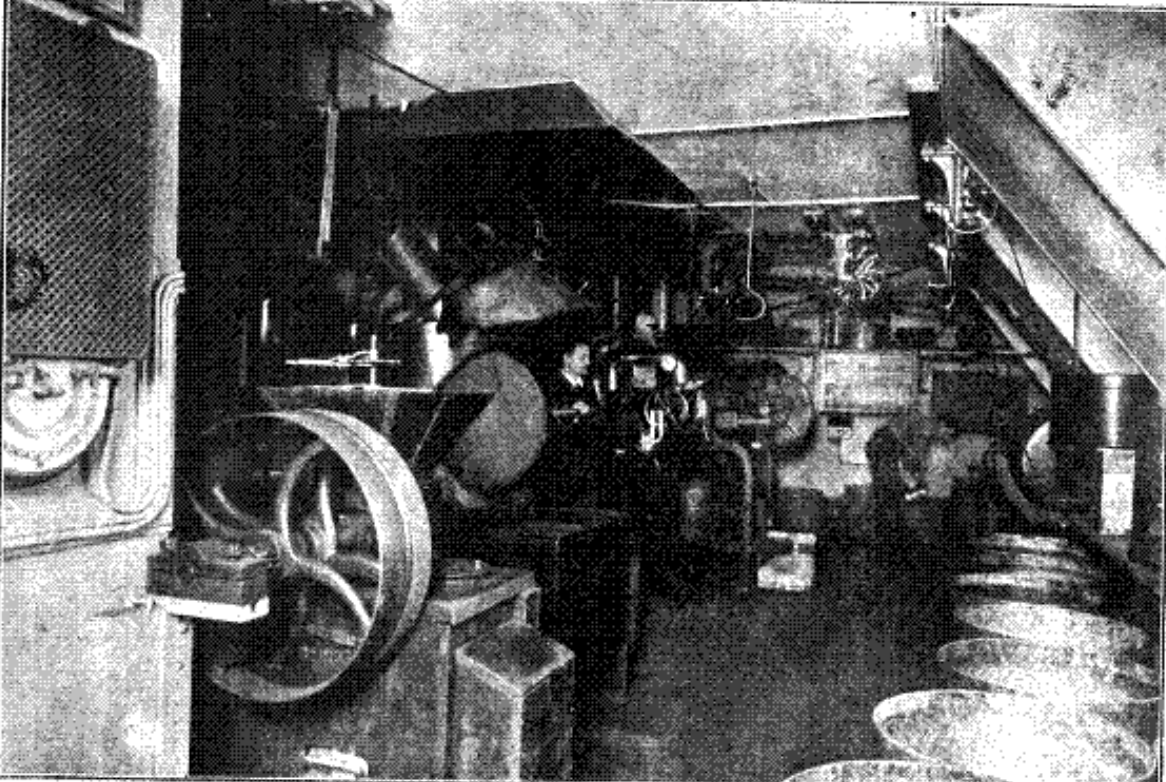
Chr. P. Hansen interior

== Architecture ==
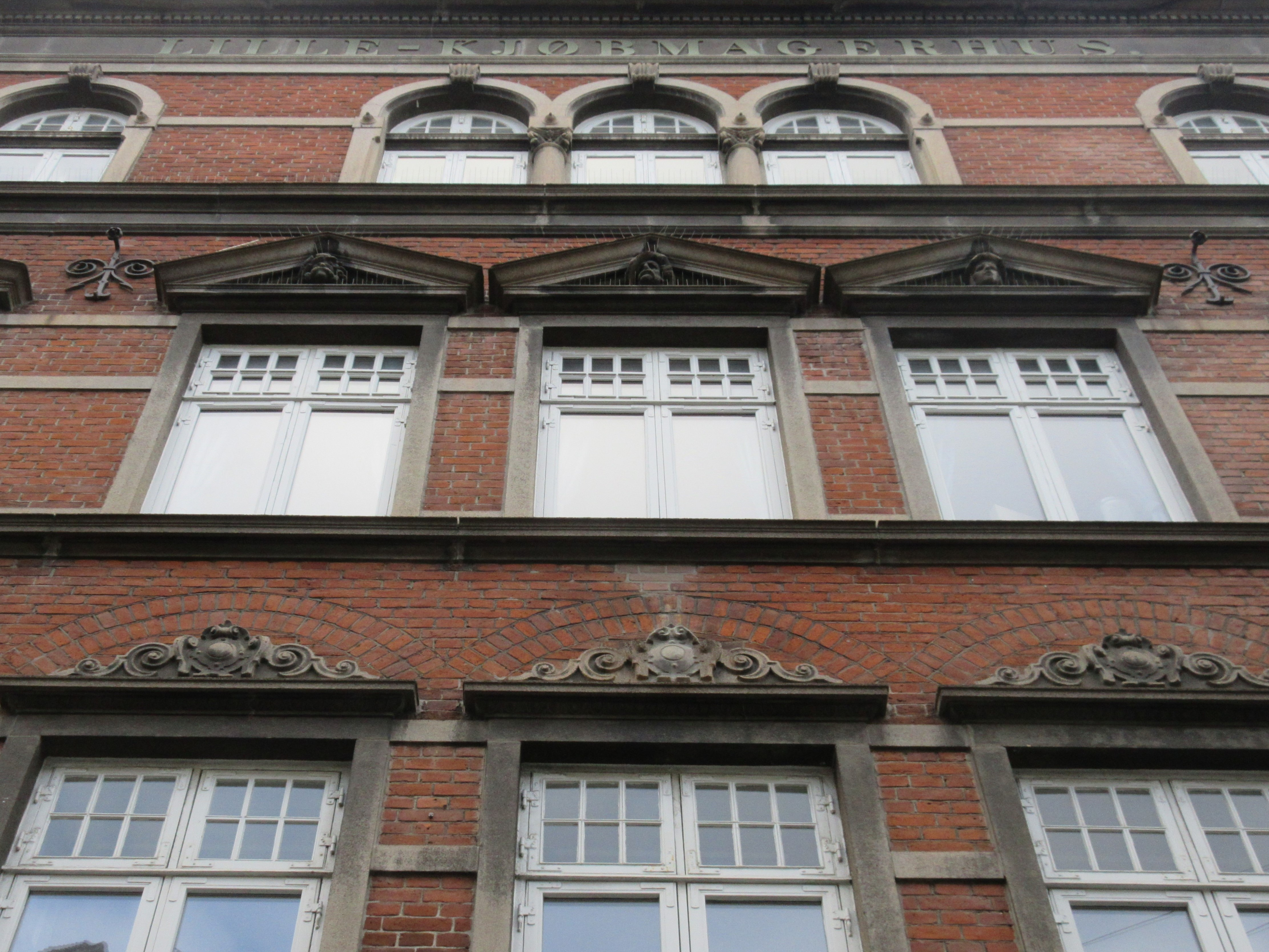
Close-up of the facade.

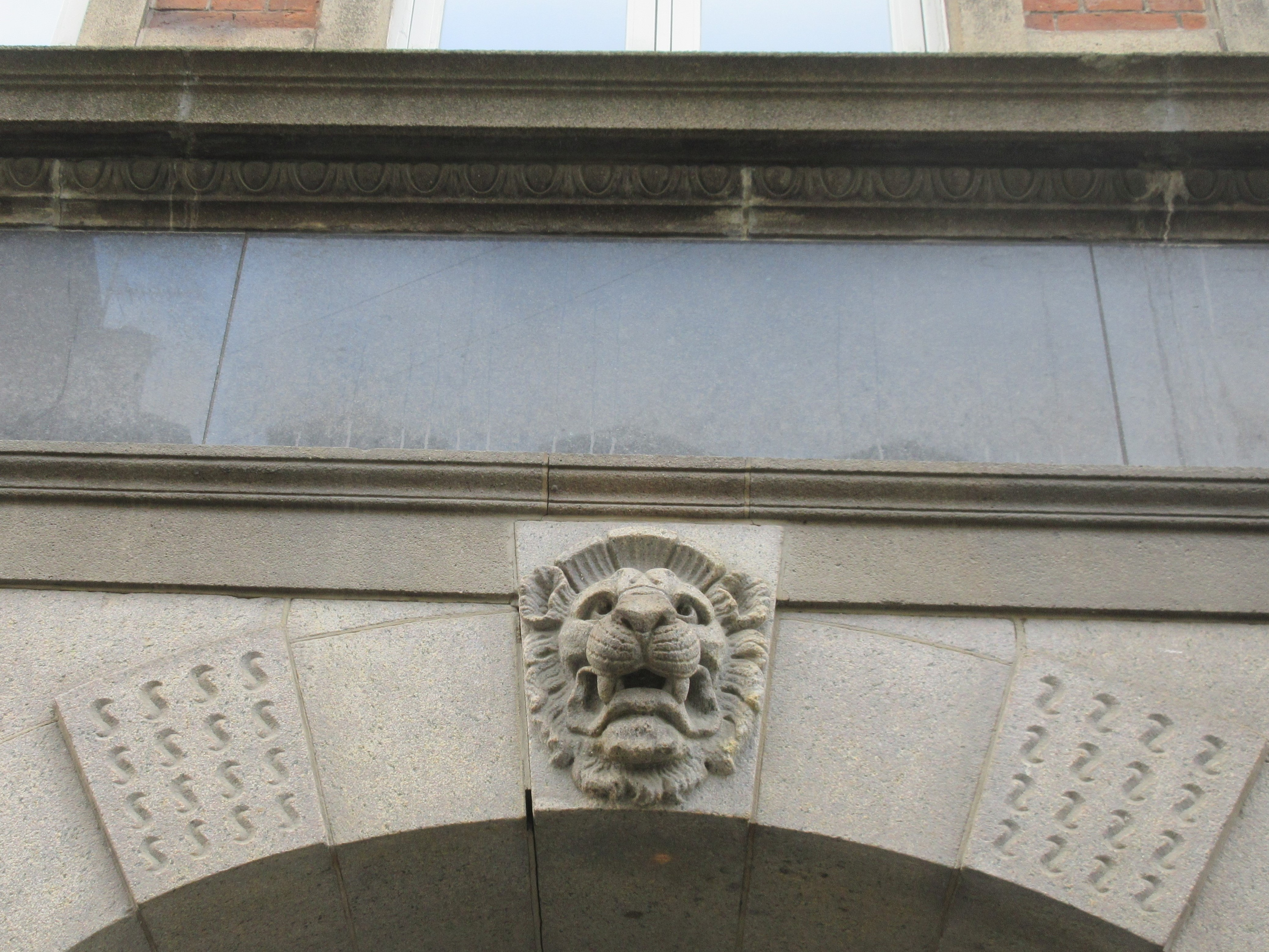
The heystone above the gate.

=== Købmagergade 55 ===
Lille Købmagerhus is a four-storey building constructed in red brick with imitation sandstone bands and other decorative details. The facade is crowned by a Renaissance gable, an arched double window, flanked by two dormer windows. The name of the building is written on a band below the gable. The second floor features an arched triple window flanked by two arched double windows. The first-floor windows, arranged in the rhythm 1–3–1, are tipped by triangular pediments with mascarons. The first-floor windows are also topped by ornamentation. Two ornamental wall anchors are seen at the transition between the three upper floors. The keystone above the central gateway features a lion's head. A side wing extends from the rear side of the building along the north side of a central courtyard.

=== Peder Hvitfeldts Stræde 4 ===
Peder Hvitfeldts Stræde 4 is a five-bay-wide, three-storey building with a plastered, grey-painted facade. A gateway is located in the bay furthest to the right. The main entrance to the upper floor is located in the second bay from the left. The mansard roof was added in 1916–17. A side wing extends from the rear side of the building along the north side of the central courtyard. At the other end, it is attached to the side wing of Købmagergade 44.

== Today ==
As of 2008, Købmagergade 55/Peder Gvitfeldts Stræde 4 belonged to Kirkbi. The ground-floor tenants are Glitter (left) and Matas (right).
