= Sparekassen Bikuben =

Sparekassen Bikuben was a Danish savings bank founded on 3 March 1857 in Copenhagen, Denmark. It merged with GiroBank under the name BG Bank in 1995 and has later been absorbed by Danske Bank. Its former headquarters at Silkegade 6-8 was listed on the Danish registry of protected buildings and places in 1999.

== History ==
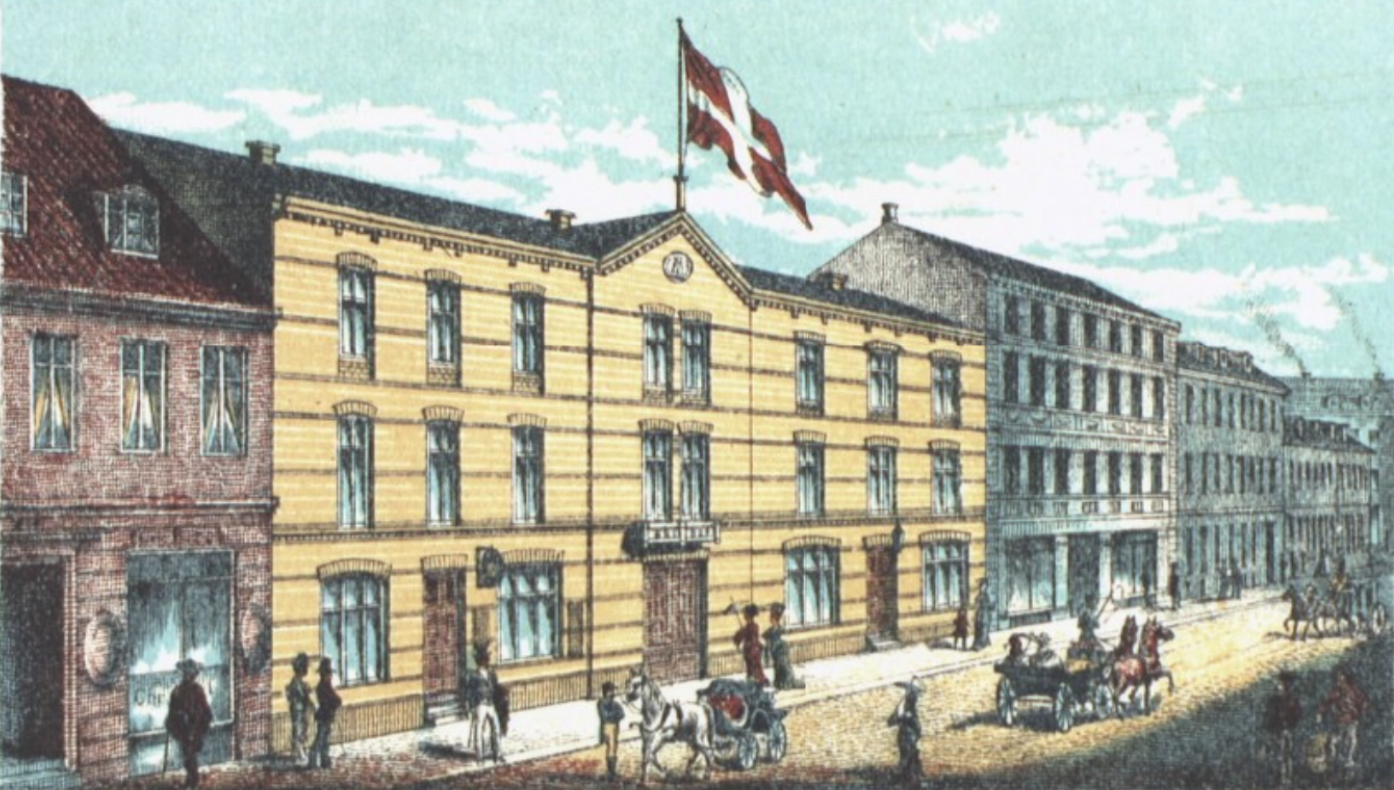
Stilling's building at Silkegade 8

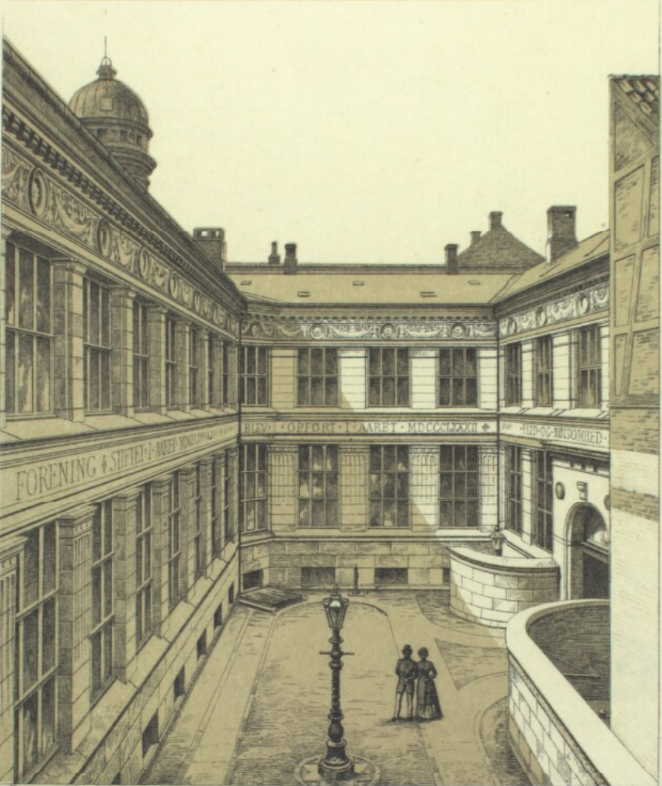
The courtyard of the new building in the 1880s

Sparekassen Bikuben was founded on 3 March 1857 and was initially operated out of the bank manager's apartment at Silkegade 13. The building on the other side of the street (No. 8) was acquired in 1860. It was subsequently adapted for use as a bank building by Hans Conrad Stilling.

After five years the expanding savings bank had run out of space and purchased a second building in Pilestræde but was at this point unable to acquire the building at the corner. The two buildings were replaced by a new bank building in 1881-84. The corner building was finally acquired in 1897. It was demolished and replaced by a new wing by Gotfred Tvedes in 1927-29.

== Building ==
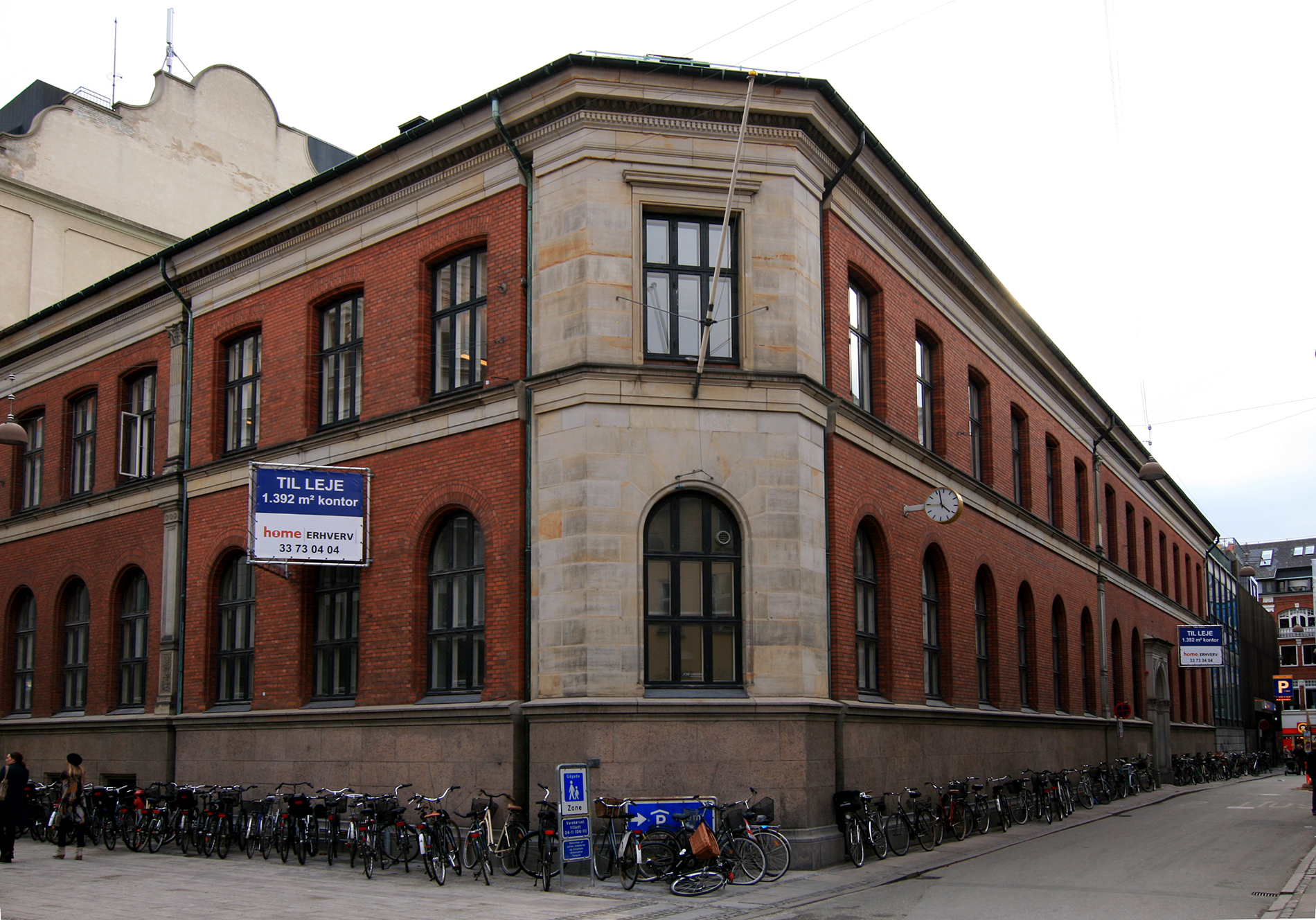
No. 6-8: The Bikuben Building

Sparekassen Bikuben's former headquarters (No. 6-8) is a four-winged complex surrounding a central courtyard. The oldest part of the complex is from 1881-1884 and was designed by Johan Daniel Herholdt. The corner building is from 1927-29 and was designed by Gotfred Tvede. The youngest of the four wings is from 1959 and was designed by Poul Kjærgaard. The complex was listed on the Danish registry of protected buildings and places in 1999.
