= Wilhelm Marstrand =

Painter and illustrator (1810–1873)

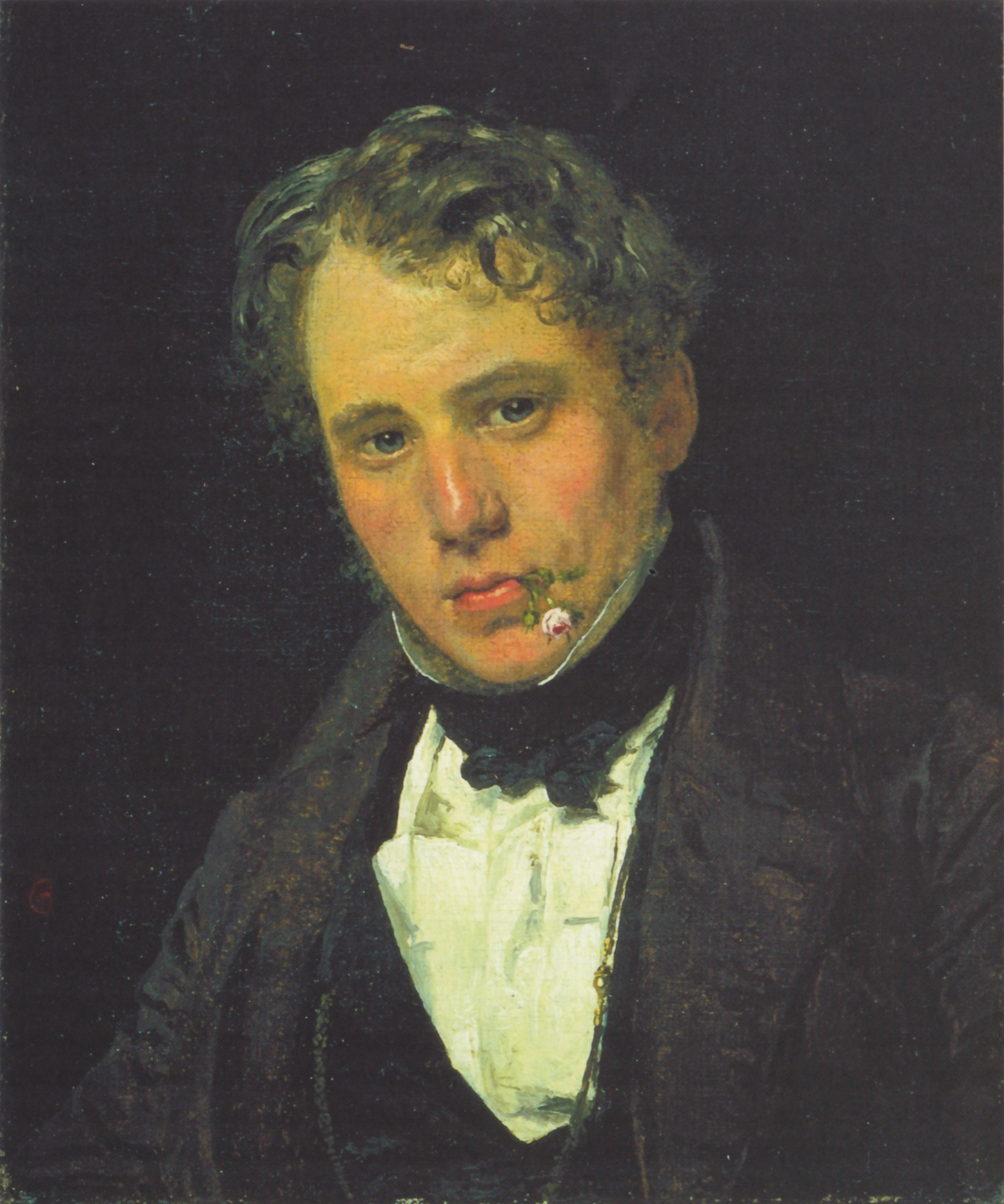
- Christen Købke, Portrait of Wilhelm Marstrand, oil on canvas, 1836
- Born: Nicolai Wilhelm Marstrand; 24 December 1810; Copenhagen, Denmark
- Died: 25 March 1873 (aged 62); Copenhagen, Denmark
- Education: Royal Danish Academy of Fine Arts
- Known for: Painting
- Movement: Danish Golden Age, Romanticism

Nicolai Wilhelm Marstrand (24 December 1810 – 25 March 1873) was a Danish painter and illustrator. Marstrand is one of the most renowned artists belonging to the Golden Age of Danish Painting.

== Early development and academy training ==
Nicolai Wilhelm Marstrand was born on 24 December 1810 in Copenhagen, Denmark to Nikolai Jacob Marstrand, an instrument maker and inventer, and Petra Othilia Smith.

Marstrand studied at Copenhagen's Metropolitan School (Metropolitanskolen), but had little interest in books, and left around 16 years of age. Christoffer Wilhelm Eckersberg, painter and professor at the Royal Danish Academy of Art (Det Kongelige Danske Kunstakademi) in Copenhagen, was a close friend of Wilhelm's father, and it was to all appearance Eckersberg who recommended an artistic career for young Wilhelm. Wilhelm had already shown artistic talent, tackling difficult subjects such as group scenes with many figures and complicated composition.

Thus, at 16 years old, Marstrand began his studies at the Academy under Eckersberg, attending the school from 1826 to 1833. Although his interests had a firm hold in genre themes – depiction of the daily life he observed around him in Copenhagen's streets, especially middle-class society – he would soon reach for the pinnacle of academic acceptability: the history painting.

History painting displayed what was grand – classical themes from mythology and history, rather than daily life. The traditions and the taste of traditional art critics strongly favored it. It was therefore something to strive for, in spite of Marstrand's equal skill at depicting more modest themes, and of the enjoyment he had in portraying the crowds, the diversions of the city, and the humor and story behind the hustle and bustle. Marstrand's creative production would, through many paintings and illustrations made not only during the 1830s but throughout his life, never abandon this inclination toward displaying the simple life of his times.

At the same time Christian Waagepetersen, wine merchant to the Danish court and supporter of the arts, also became an important patron for Marstrand during this early period. His painting "A musical evening party" (Et musikalsk aftenselskab) (1834), depicts such an occasion at the home of Waagepetersen, and was an important transition painting for Marstrand.

Despite an unmistakably growing recognition, Marstrand never received the Academy's gold medal. This medal was coveted not only for its great prestige, but also because it came with a travel stipend for furthering the laureate's artistic training. Marstrand's attempts at winning the medal were unsuccessful both in 1833 with his neoclassical "Flight to Egypt" (Flugten til Ægypten) and in 1835 with "Odysseus and Nausikaa". This was a disappointment, as he had won both available silver medals in 1833.

== Foreign travel ==
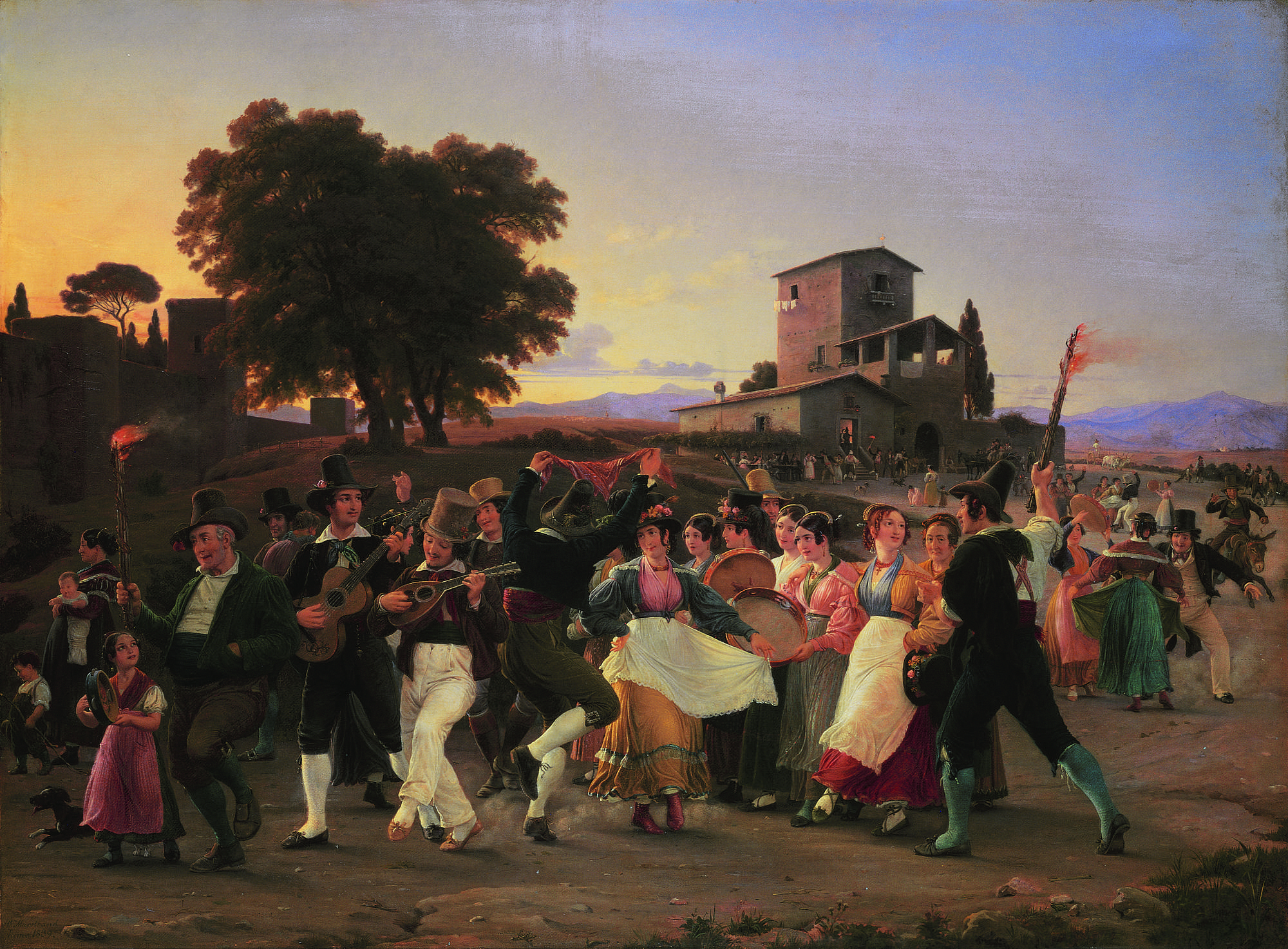
Amusement outside the walls of Rome on an October evening (1839)

Gold medal or not, the Academy did award Marstrand a travel stipend. In August 1836 he began the first of his many travels, going by way of Germany to Rome in Italy, stopping on the way at Berlin, Dresden, Nuremberg and Munich. In Italy, where he stayed for four years, he painted many idealized depictions of daily life, especially festivities. He returned to Italy several times, the last visit being in 1869, and when in Rome he spent summer months each year in the hill towns Olevano Romano, Civitella and Subiaco. He was enchanted with Italy and with the ways of life of the Italian people. He portrayed a colorful, joyous, and romantic view of them, infused with a newfound ideal of beauty.

He also painted a number of portraits during this first stay in Italy. Among these are portraits of other travelling Danish artists, such as Christen Købke and travelling partner Johan Adolph Kittendorff. He completed sketches for a large portrait of botanist and politician J. F. Schouw, which would be later realized as a painting.

== Career development ==
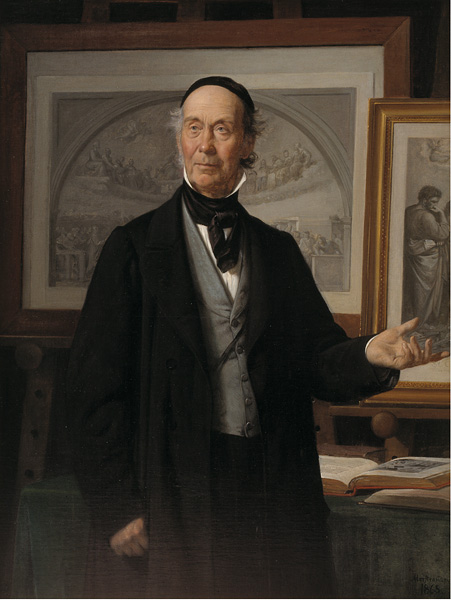
Niels Laurits Høyen

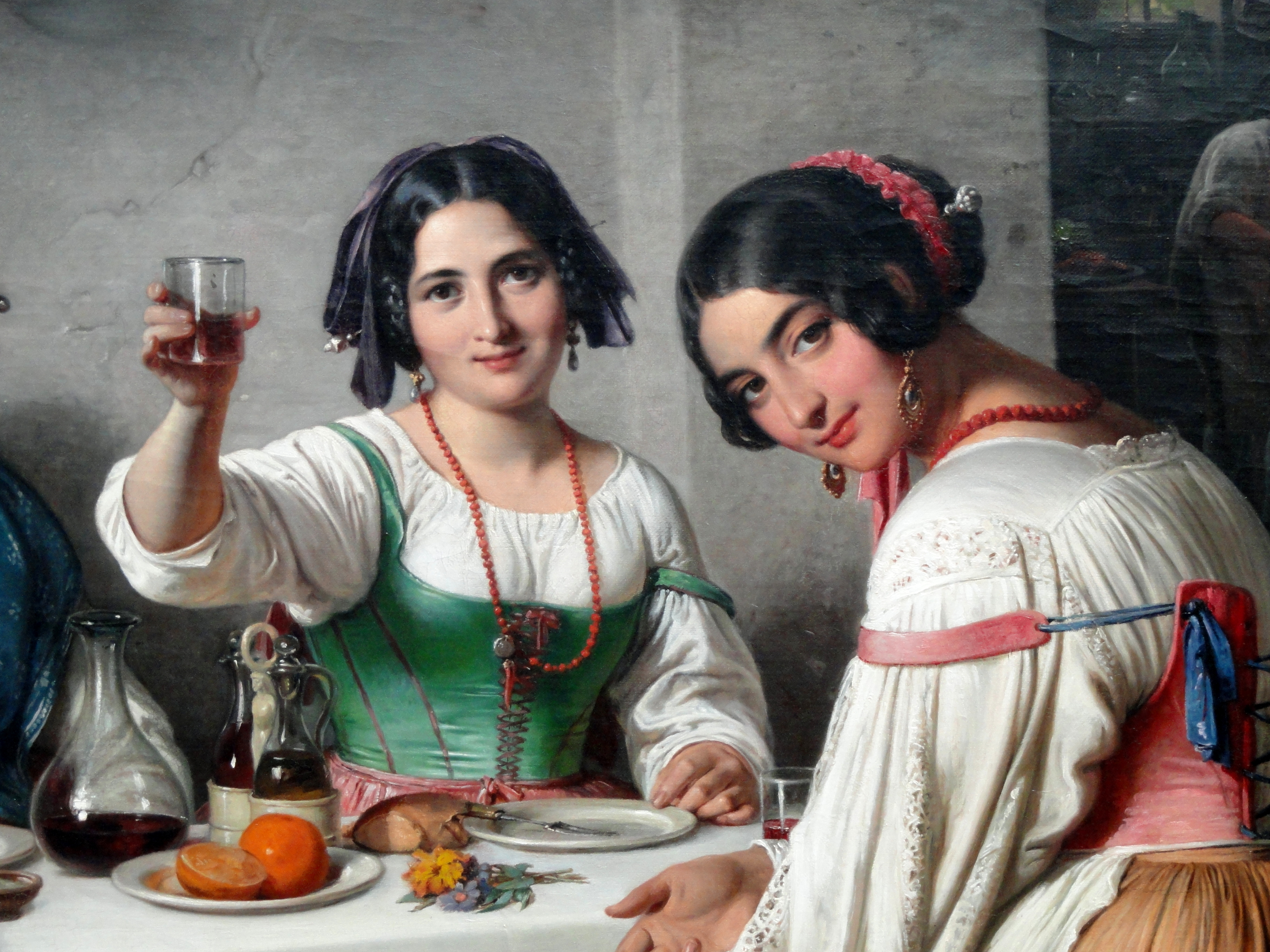
Italian Osteria Scene.

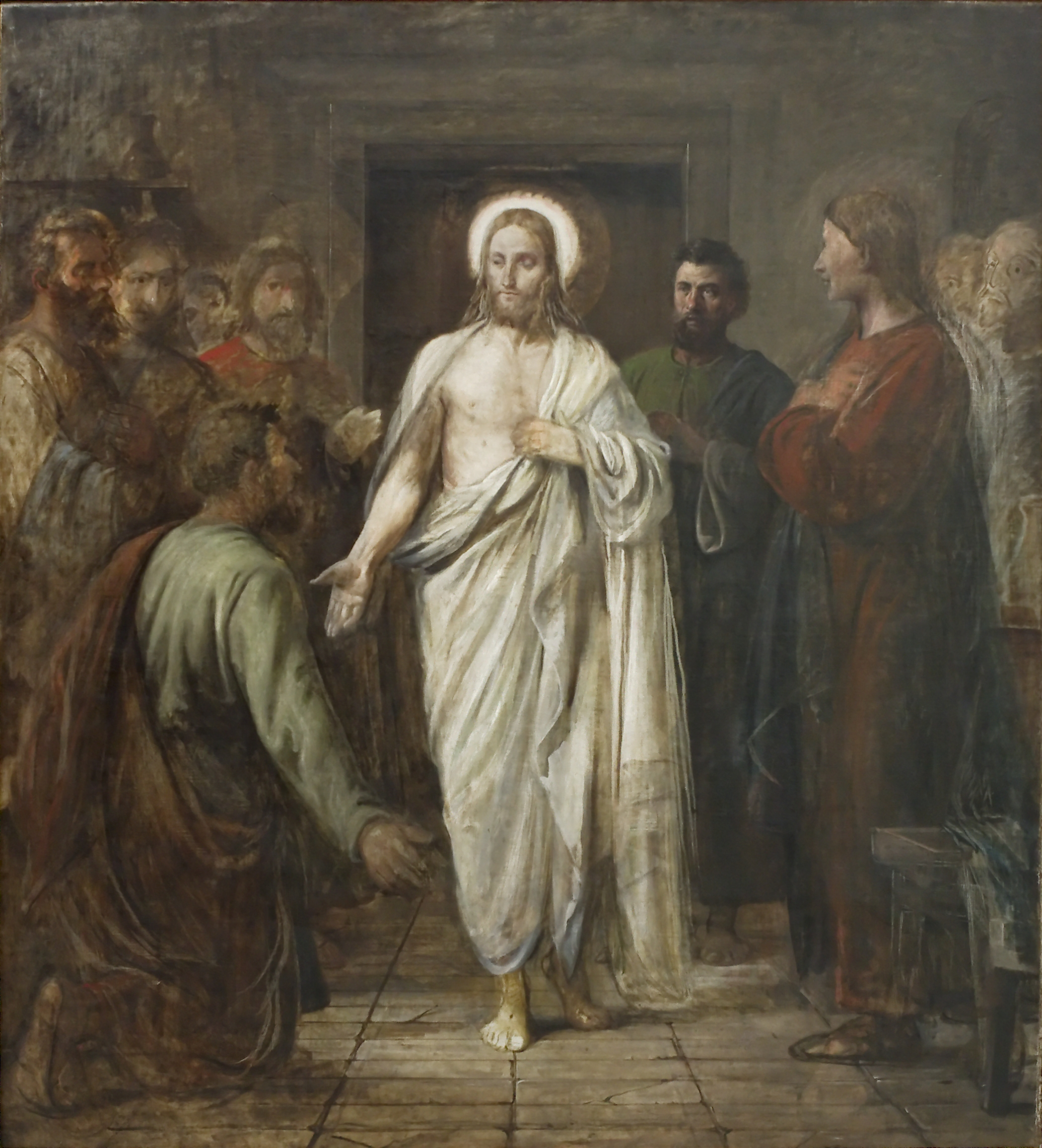
Den vantro Thomas, Christ and the Doubting Thomas

Marstrand returned to Denmark at the end of 1841, stopping in Munich and Paris on the way. In Denmark he strove to bring back that which he learned in Italy and allow it to develop in his home culture.

He became a member of the art Academy on 19 June 1843, after submitting the painting "Erasmus Montanus" as his admissions piece. He became a professor at the Academy in 1848. He endeavored to let his students evolve according to their own skills and interests. Among these were the two most renowned Skagen painters Peder Severin Krøyer and Michael Ancher, as well as Carl Bloch and Kristian Zahrtmann.

Marstrand continued to travel regularly around Europe throughout his life, specifically to London, Vienna, Belgium, but especially to Italy and Rome, at times in the company of such fellow artists such as P. C. Skovgaard and Johan Adolph Kittendorff, or of art historian and critic Niels Lauritz Høyen.

Marstrand also continued to apply inspiration from Italy in his paintings. He now supplied it with themes from literature and the theatre, portraying scenes from Don Quixote by Cervantes, as well as from Erasmus Montanus and other plays by Ludvig Holberg. Holberg's works would in fact provide Marstrand with an endless stream of inspiration. He also continued to paint genre paintings, and to make sketches, caricatures, and drawings, capturing the spirit of his time with gentle or more biting satire.

On 8 June 1850, Marstrand married Margrethe Christine Weidemann, with whom he had five children. His family became yet a new source for his art. There are similarities in his portraits with children to those made by Constantin Hansen, a contemporary, friend, and student of Eckersberg.

Marstrand returned to portrait painting with even more seriousness in the late 1850s, depicting some of the key figures of the age, including Constantin Hansen (1852, 1862), Bernhard Severin Ingemann (1860), Grundtvig (1863), Høyen (1869), the architect Michael Gottlieb Bindesbøll, not forgetting his earlier portraiture of Købke in 1839.

During the 1850s and 1860s, and especially after the death of his wife in 1867, he turned to religious themes. He also gave renewed attention to mythology and history. He painted two remarkable great murals for King Christian IV's chapel in Roskilde Cathedral in 1864–1866, both of which have contributed to the popular monarch's enduring fame. He painted an important altarpiece at Faaborg Church. In 1871, not long before his death, he delivered several massive wall paintings commissioned for the University of Copenhagen's Celebration Hall. This historical, religious, and monumental development added yet an essential dimension to the already broad scope of Marstrand's work.

At the same time, during the last ten years of his life, part of his work became very intimate. A series of paintings made during the last 6 years of his life featured a naked woman, while others were deeply religious, more inwardly so than the monumental work.

Marstrand was named Director (Chancellor) of the art Academy during two periods: the first period from 1853–1857, the second from 1863 until his death. In 1867 he was awarded the rank of State Councillor (etatsråd).

In October 1871, Marstrand was struck with a brain hemorrhage and partially paralysed, losing much of his work capacity before his death in 1873.

== Posthumous reception ==
To his contemporaries and a further few generations, Marstrand ranked among Denmark's great painters of all time, to some as the very greatest. Still, as the 20th century progressed, his work had become less valued artistically, and to some, considered unfashionable; conversely, recent decades seem to have afforded new appreciation.

== See also ==
- List of Danish painters
- Troels Marstrand (1815–1889)
- Jacob Marstrand (1848–1935)

Cultural offices
| Preceded by Herman Wilhelm Bissen | Director of the Royal Danish Academy of Fine Arts; 1853–1857 | Succeeded by Jens Adolf Jerichau |
| Preceded by Jens Adolf Jerichau | Director of the Royal Danish Academy of Fine Arts; 1863–1873 | Succeeded by Ferdinand Meldahl |
