= Amerikavej =

Street in Copenhagen, Denmark

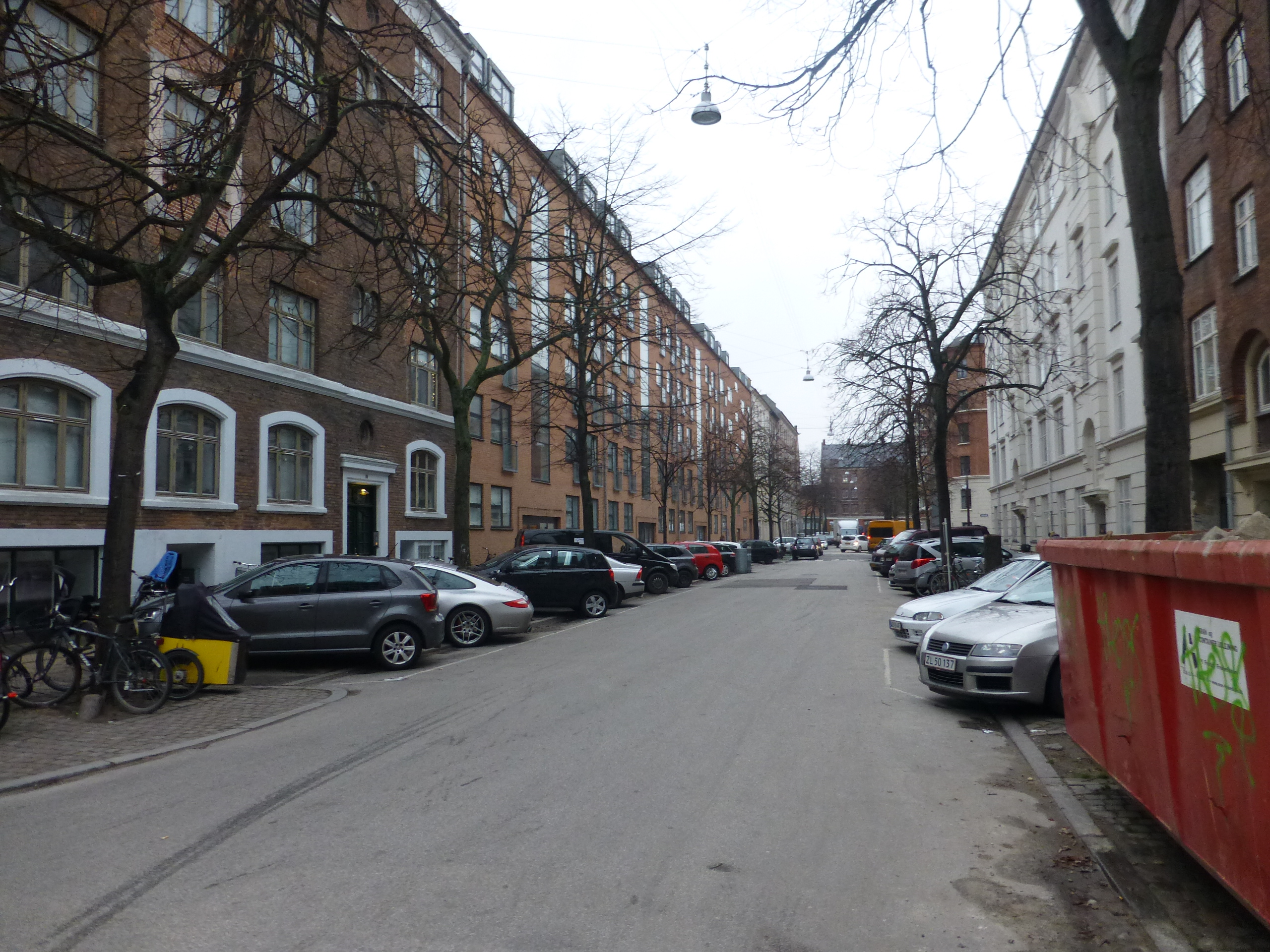
- The street Amerikavej in Vesterbro in Copenhagen.
- Length: 200 m (660 ft)
- Location: Copenhagen, Denmark
- Quarter: Vesterbro
- Postal code: 1756
- Nearest metro station: Frederiksberg Allé
- Coordinates: 55°40′10.34″N 12°32′30.42″E
- North end: Vesterbrogade
- South end: Trøjborggade

Amerikavej ("America Road") is a street in the Vesterbro district of Copenhagen, Denmark.

== History ==
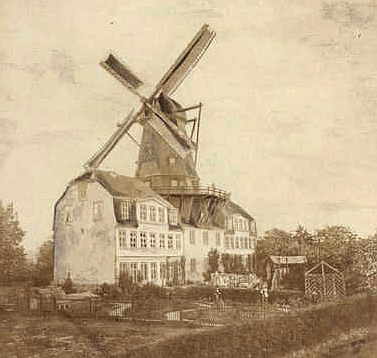
Amerika Mølle

Copenhagen's gallows were from 1622 to 1792 located approximately where Amerikavej runs today.

John Murray Forbes, America's consul in Copenhagen, constructed a country house named Amerika at the site in the 1810s. He commissioned Ole Johansen Winstrup to construct a windmill to the rear of the building in 1814. The construction was based on an advanced American adaption of Greek and Spanish windmills. The windmill became colloquially known as Amerika Mølle and that was later adopted as its official name. It was destroyed by fire in 1849 and replaced by a traditional Danish smock mill. A private road replaced the driveway to the windmill in 1854 and it was officially given the name Amerikavej in 1863.

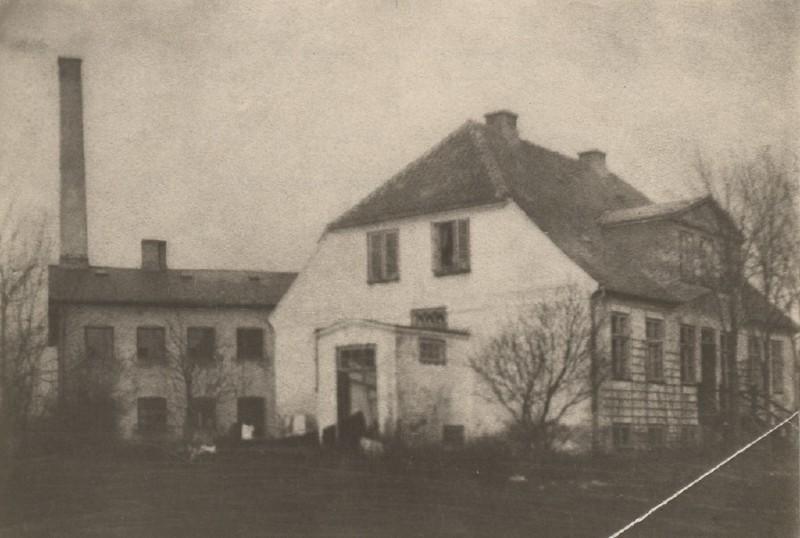
Theodor Christian Marstrand's home and tool factory

Theodor Christian Marstrand owned a property at Amerikavej where he both lived and operated a tool factory. His son Jacob Marstrand grew up to become a prominent figure in local politics in Copenhagen.

The upper part of the windmill was dismantled in 1882. The lower part was converted into a workhouse under the name Københavns Arbejdshjem or Redningshjemmet Nain in 1884.

== Buildings ==
No. 3 is from 1896 and was designed by Heinrich Hansen. Rabens Saloner has a showroom on the street.
