= John Murray Forbes (diplomat) =

American diplomat

Chargé d'Affaires to the Republic of Buenos Aires
- In office August 20, 1825 – June 14, 1831
- Preceded by: Caesar A. Rodney (as Minister Plenipotentiary)
- Succeeded by: Francis Baylies

Personal details
- Born: 1771
- Died: June 14, 1831 (aged 59–60) Buenos Aires, Argentine Confederation
- Relatives: John Murray Forbes (nephew)
- Occupation: Diplomat

John Murray Forbes (1771 – June 14, 1831) was an American diplomat. He served as the Chargé d'Affaires to the Republic of Buenos Aires from 1825 to 1831.

== Early life ==
John Murray Forbes was born in 1771.

== Career ==
Forbes served as the American consul in Copenhagen, Hamburg and Stettin from 1801 to 1819. He owned the country house America outside Copenhagen and constructed an American-style windmill known as America Mill at the site in 1814.

He served as the Chargé d'Affaires to the Republic of Buenos Aires (later United States Ambassador to Argentina) from 1825 to 1831.

== Later career ==
In 1825 he was elected a Fellow of the American Academy of Arts and Sciences and a member of the American Antiquarian Society.

== Death ==
Forbes died on June 14, 1831, in Buenos Aires.
