= Nicolai Jacob Marstrand =

Danish mechanician and inventor (1770–1829)

Jacob Marstrand
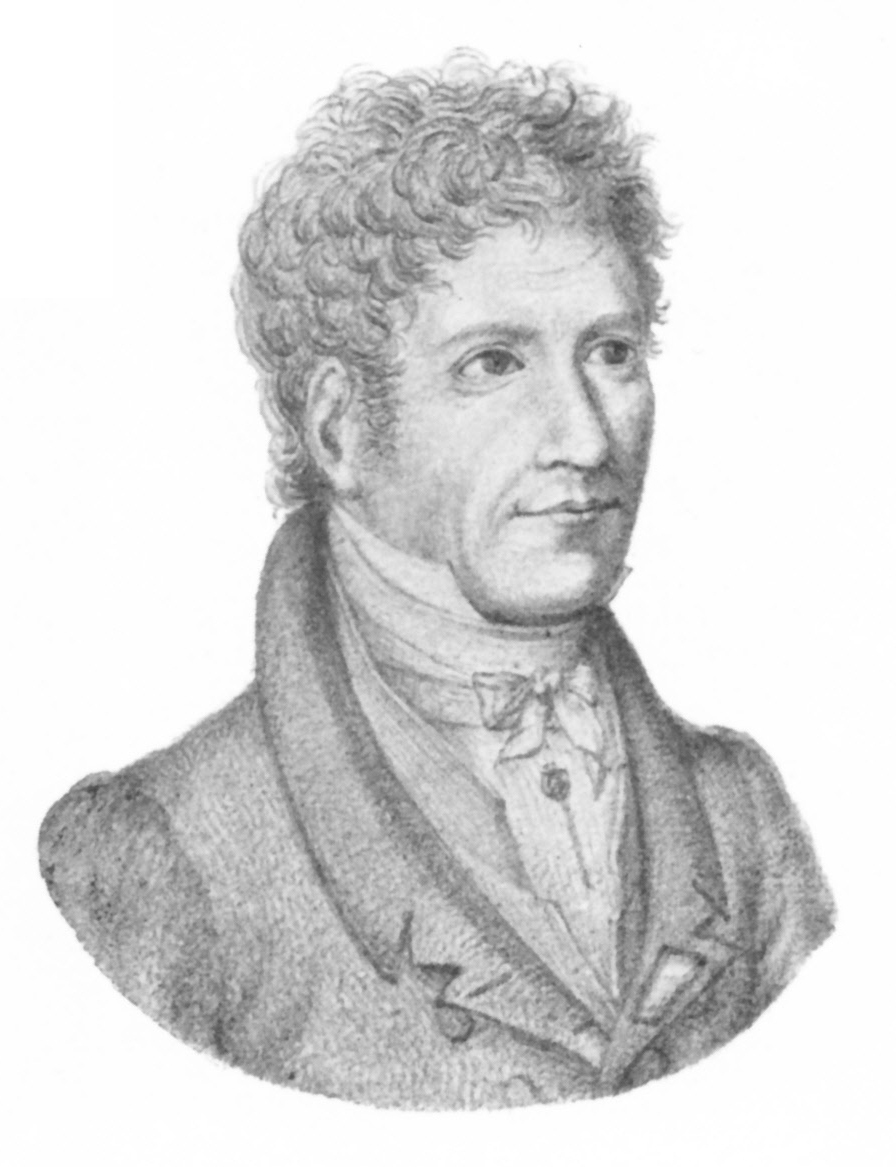
- Nicolai Jacob Marstrand on a drawing from 1825 by his then 15-year-old son Wilhelm Marstrand.
- Born: 5 August 1770; Kvikne, Norway
- Died: 12 July 1829 (aged 58); Copenhagen, Denmark
- Occupations: Baker and mechanician

Nicolai Jacob Marstrand (5 August 1770 – 12 July 1829) was a Danish mechanician and inventor. He was the father of painter Wilhelm Marstrand.

== Early life and education ==
Marstrand was born on 5 August 1776 in Kvikne in Østerdalen, Norway, the son of manager (bergskriver) of Inset Copperworks Even Nicolai Marstrand (1723–85) and Magdalene Elisabeth Schnitler (1730–1802). The family moved to Trondheim when his father died in 1785. He graduated from Trondheim Cathedral School in 1789.

== Career ==
Aged c. 20, Marstrand moved to Denmark, where he initially worked odd jobs, including a private tutor and a road works assistant, before being employed as an assistant under colonel Eilert Tscherning at Frederiksværk. He was later promoted to the position of mechanical consultant to the government, and relocated to the capital Copenhagen in 1806. The following year he was sent to England but due to the outbreak of war he was suspected of espionage and had to flee the country.

Back in Copenhagen, he was granted a royal privilege as a baker after inventing a kneading machine, opening a bakery in Silkegade in 1810. He also established a mechanical workshop, constructing spinning machines and various musical instruments, especially harps. He invented an oil press in 1812 and in 1813 was granted a monopoly on a horse mill. In 1827, he invented a machine for copying of sculptures.

Marstrand was from 1808 also inspector of the workshops at the Royal Institute for the Deaf and Mute. In 1813, he was appointed as manager of the workshops at Forbedringshuset.

== Personal life ==
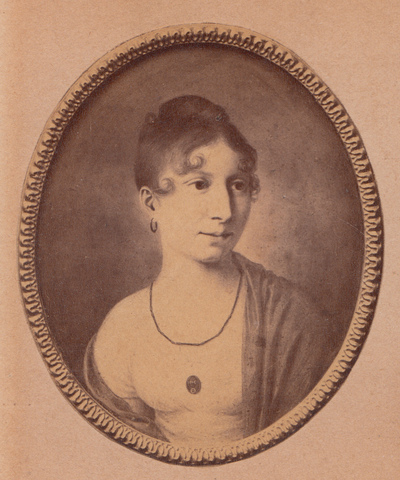
Petra Ottilia Marstrand

Marstrand married Petra Ottilia Smith (28 February 1778 – 15 November 1847), a daughter of provost Troels S. (1744–1823) and Anna Agnete Plum (1752–1805), on 26 September 1804 in Holbæk. Five of their seven children survived childhood: Naval officer Osvald J. Marstrand, plantation owner Otto Marstrand, baker and politician Troels Marstrand, painter Wilhelm Marstrand and toolmaker Theodor Marstrand.

Marstrand's home was a meeting place for many notable artists and writers of the time. Once a week, he hosted a quartet in which he played the violin and the painter C. W. Eckersberg played cello.

In 1809, he was awarded Dannebrogordenens Hæderstegn. In 1811 he was appointed as Kommerceråd. He died on 12 July 1829 and is buried in Assistens Cemetery.
