= Troels Marstrand =

Danish industrialist (1815–1889)

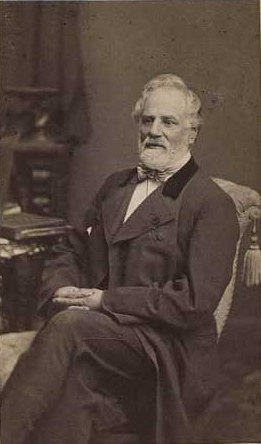
- Troels Marstrand
- Born: 13 May 1815; Copenhagen, Denmark
- Died: 23 August 1889 (aged 74); Copenhagen, Denmark
- Occupation: Businessman

Troels Marstrand (13 May 1815 – 23 August 1889) was a Danish industrialist.

== Early life and education ==
Marstrand was born on 13 May 1815 in Copenhagen, the son of mechanician Nicolai Jacob Marstrand (1770–1829) and Petra O. Smith (1778–1847). He was the brother of painter Vilhelm Marstrand and naval officer Osvald J. Marstrand. Their father ran a bakery in Silkegade. It was continued by his mother after his father's death in 1820. After his confirmation, Marstrand initially worked in his uncle's office in Skælskør before apprenticing as a baker in Køge.

== Career ==
In 1835 Marstrand travelled to Germany as a journeyman and worked for some time in Berlin.

Back in Denmark in 1837, Marstrand started working as a clerk for the police master in Helsingør before taking over the family's bakery in Silkegade in 1839. Under his management, it commenced a large-scale production of rye bread and hardtack and was expanded in 1850 with a steam mill. The bakery was struck by fire in 1849 and 1856. After the last of the two fires, Marstrand sold the property in Silkegade and bought Vodroff's Mill outside the city.

When the mill was also destroyed by fire in 1865, Marstrand started a small beer brewery which operated under the name Troels Af. After the acquisition of Aldersro Brewery in 1884, the name of the brewery was changed to A/S Marstrands Bryggerier (Marstrand's Brereries), but Marstrand had left it long before that time.

== Politics and public office ==
Marstrand was elected as alderman of the Bakers' Guild in Copenhagen in 1847. He was active in Industriforeningen where he argued in favour of the introduction of freedom of trade in 1857. In 1862, he was a co-founder and one of the first board members of the Free Trade Society. He was a member of the Copenhagen City Council from 1857 to 1863.

== Personal life ==
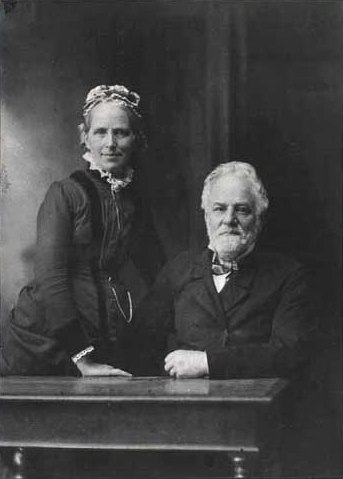
Troels Marstrand with his second wife

Marstrand married twice. His first wife was Caroline Emilie Carlsen (7 May 1812 – 21 October 1859), daughter of master joiner Peter Carlsen (1787 – c. 1817) and Kristine Marie Müller (1785–1871). They were married on 7 November 1845 in the Church of the Holy Ghost. His second wife was Sofie Emilie Jansen Tiaden (5 May 1829 – 21 February 1902), daughter of building painter Tobias Jansen Tiaden (c. 1787–1850) and Anna Johanne Brun (1798–1879). They were married on 24 September 1880.

Marstrand struggled with poor health and had to take long periods off from work after the fire at Vodroff's Mill. He spent some of the time at the folk high schools in Askov and Vallekilde. He bought Fredsholm at Helsingør which became a meeting place for many members of the Marstrand family. Marstrand published an autobiography in connection with his 70th birthday. He died on 23 August 1889 and is buried at Assistens Cemetery.
