= Julie Marstrand =

Danish sculptor (1882–1943)

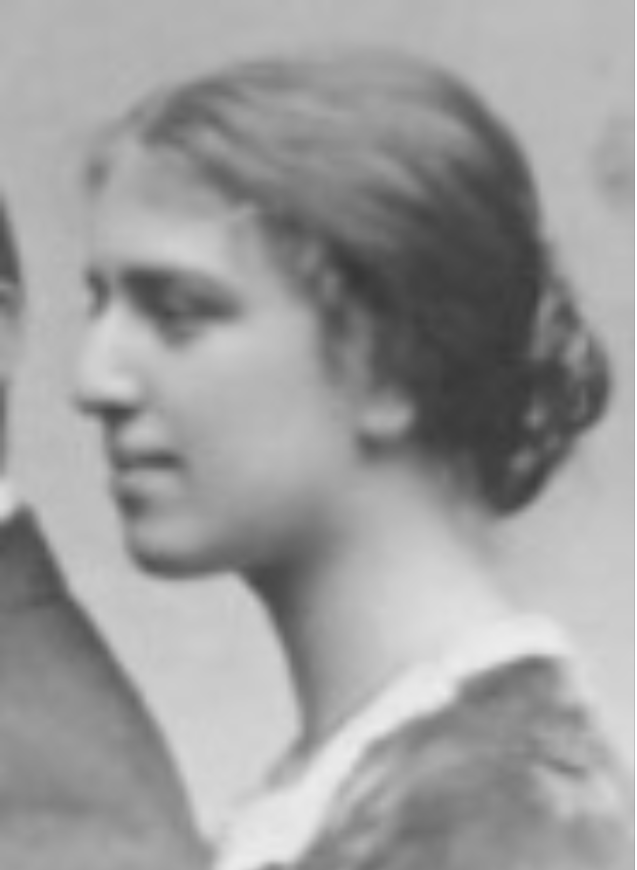
Julie Marstrand

Julie Marstrand, married name Julie Marstrand Blegvad, (1882–1943) was a Danish sculptor who specialized in portrait busts. One of her most famous works is her realistic bronze bust of the explorer Knud Rasmussen (1921). As an illustrator and a writer, she contributed to Berlingske Tidende and as a textile artist, created designs for Emilie Tolle's weaving enterprise.

== Biography ==
Born on 26 June 1882 in Copenhagen, Julie Marstrand was the daughter of Jacob Nicolaj Marstrand (1848–1935), a baker and mayor, and Marie Elisabeth Neergaard (1846–1914). She was raised in a cultivated, well-to-do home together with her younger brother Even (1879–1949) who became a cleric, social economist and writer. In March 1905, she married the physician Nields Reinhold Blegvad (1880–1970) with whom she had four children: Viggo, Inger (1911), Jørgen (1911) and Jacob (1921), who became an architect. The marriage was dissolved in 1926.

Marstrand attended Copenhagen's Arts and Crafts School for Women, also receiving instruction at the arts school run by Charlotte Sode and Julie Meldahl and from the painter Viggo Pedersen. From 1901 to 1906, she studied sculpture at the women's school attached to the Royal Danish Academy of Fine Arts. Thereafter she studied further under Valdemar Irminger and Einar Utzon-Frank.

She first exhibited at Charlottenborg in 1909, becoming an almost annual participant at the Spring Exhibitions for the rest of her life. At Rome's Colonial Exhibition in 1931, her Knud Rasmussen bust received an award. She also arranged solo shows in Oslo (1926) and Copenhagen (1931). In 1942, she arranged a special exhibition of her works together with those of her daughter Inger Margrethe Marstrand Blegvad. In addition to her busts and her painted portraits, Marstrand also created textile designs from the late 1920s, especially for the weaver Emilie Trolle. As a writer, in 1918 she published the children's book Rejsen til Vinterland which she illustrated herself.

Julie Marstrand died on 25 April 1943 in Copenhagen. She is buried in Vestre Cemetery.

== Selected works ==
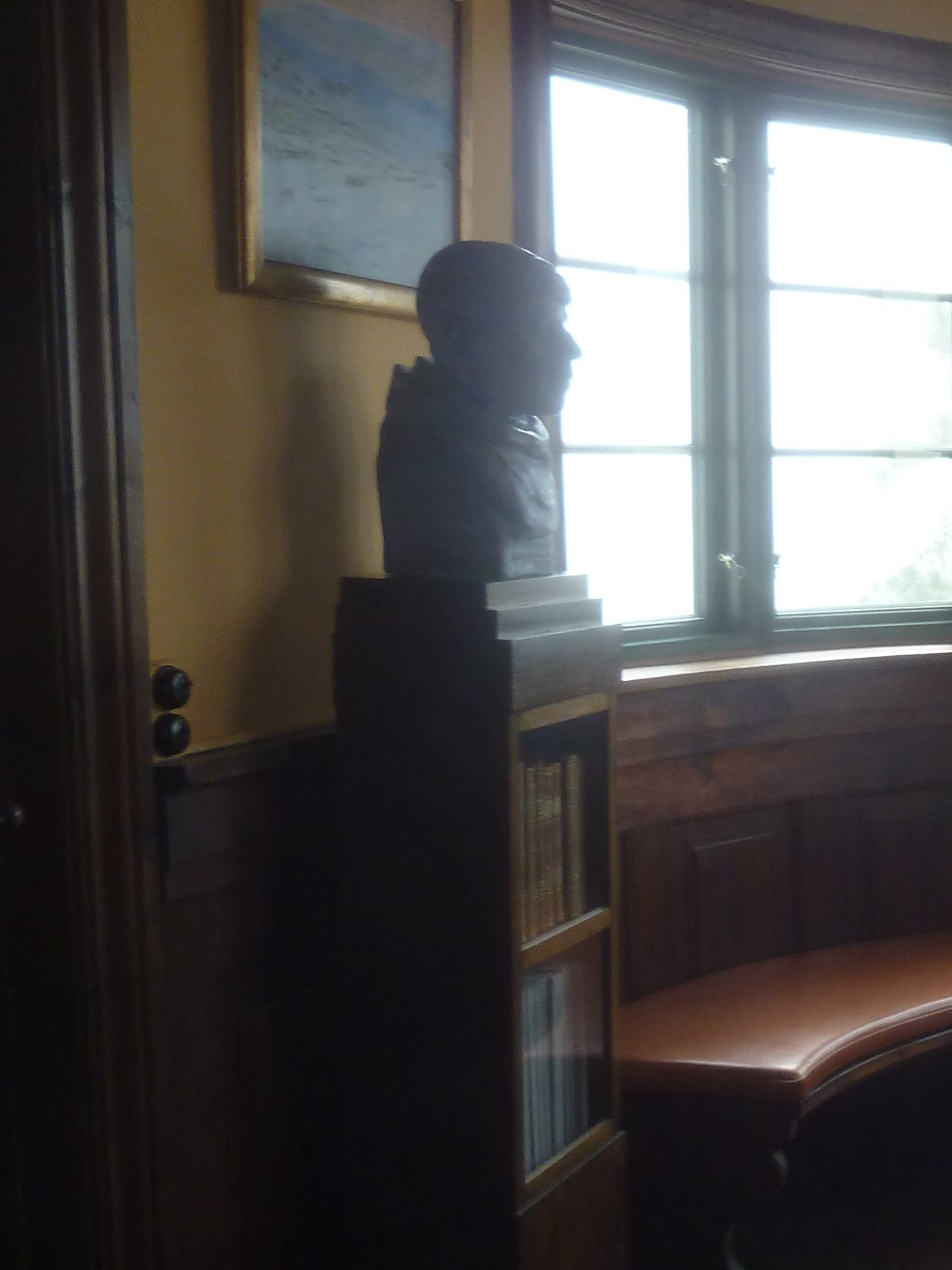
Marstrand's bust of Knud Rasmussen on display in the Knud Rasmussen House in Hundested

Portrait busts

- Jørgen (1914, bronze)
- Jacob Marstrand (bronze)
- Knud Rasmussen (bronze, 1921, Knud Rasmussen House)
- Actor Bjørn Bjørnson (bronze, Teatermuseet)
- Ingolf Schanche
- Daniel Jacobsen
- Michael Blegvad (Tranebjerg Boarding School)
- Einar Jónsson (plaster, 1930)

Portrait drawings

- Knud Rasmussen (Ilulissat Museum, Greenland)
- Jacob Appel
- Henni Forchhammer (1931)
