= Jacob Marstrand =

Danish autobiographer (1848–1935)

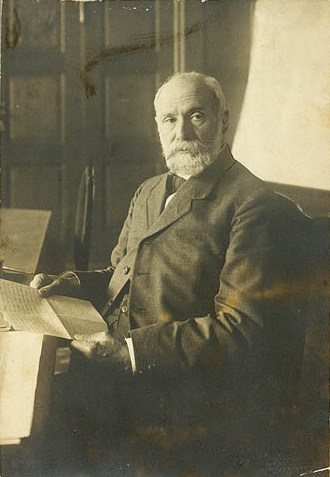
- Jacob Marstrand
- Born: 10 August 1848; Copenhagen, Denmark
- Died: 3 June 1935 (aged 86); Copenhagen, Denmark
- Occupation: Politician

Jacob Marstrand (10 August 1848 – 3 June 1935) was a Danish master baker and politician. He was a member of the Copenhagen City Council from 1893 and served as Mayor of the Technical Department from 1904 to 1917. His second wife was the children's book writer Margrethe Marstrand.

== Early life and career ==
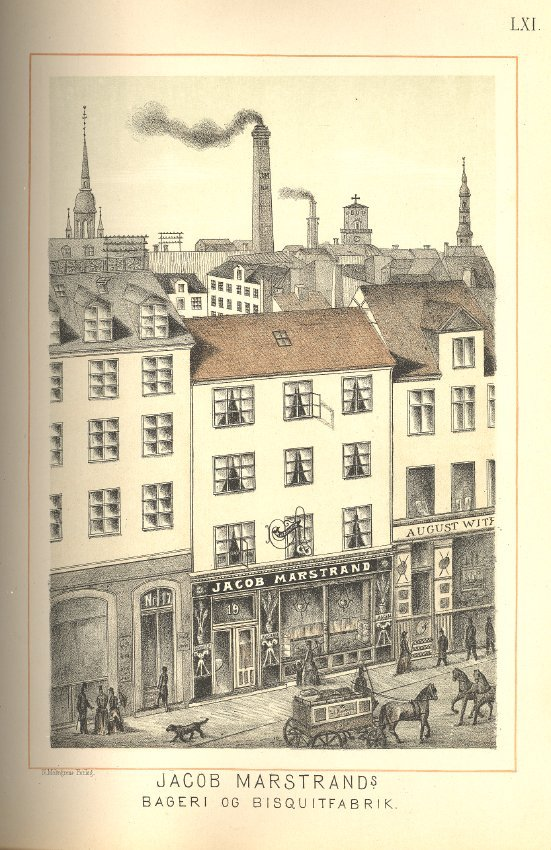
Jacob Marstrand's building at Købmagergade 19

Marstrand was born on 10 August 1848 in Copenhagen, the son of toolmaker Theodor Christian Marstrand (1817–1863) and Anna Henriette Mathilde Jansen Tiaden (1822–1900). He graduated from Schnee-kloth's School in 1865. His father had just died and his economic situation therefore forced him to give up his dream of becoming an engineer to become a baker's apprentice instead. The family lived in a house on Amerikavej where the father also had his tool factory.

Marstrand was after completing his apprenticeship in 1874 able to take over the old bakery at Købmagergade 19. The company prospered under his management. In 1885 and 1896, he replaced the old building at Købmagergade 19 with a new one designed by his brother, Sophus Marstrand (1860–1946), who was an architect. In 1904, he passed the bread factory on to his eldest son.

== Politics ==
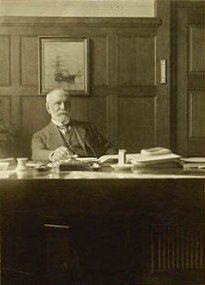
Jacob Marstrand at his desk

Marstrand was a co-founder of Copenhagen's Liberal Voters' Union in 1893 and for ten years served as its vice chairman before being elected to Copenhagen City Hall in 1893. He became a councilman in the city's Technical Department in 1900. He briefly served as acting Mayor of the Financial Department in 1904 before assuming the position as Mayor of the Technical Department. The city was booming, new districts, roads and buildings were constructed, utility infrastructure expanded and modernized and the city took over the city's tramways. He was a member of the Commission of Copenhagen's Railway Stations (Boulevardbanen).

== Other activities ==
Marstrand was struck by N.F.S. Grundtvig's thoughts from an early age and worked for a while for F. F. Falkenstjerne's folk high school in Frederiksberg and later his magazine. He wrote biographies of Benjamin Franklin, F. F. Falkenstjerne, C. F. Tietgen, George Stephenson, Bjørnstjerne Bjørnson and Herman Trier (completed and published posthumously by his son Even Marstrand). He also published an autobiography, Tilbageblik gennem et langt Liv.

== Personal life ==
Marstrand married twice. His first wife was Marie Elisabeth Neergaard (20 March 1846 – 3 November 1914), daughter of joiner Peter N. (1810–1859) and Cathrine Marie Fieron (1814–1888). They were married on 8 June 1875 in Tårbæk Church. They had six children, three sons and three daughters. One of the daughters was sculptor Julie Marstrand.

Marstrand's second wife was children's book writer Margrethe Lønborg Jensen (30 March 1874 – c. 15 October 1948), daughter of lithographer Harald Christian Jensen (1834–1913) and Andrea Petrine Lønborg (1836–1912). They were married on 8 July 1915 in Frederiksberg.

He died on 3 June 1935 and is buried at Vestre Cemetery.
