= Købmagerhus =

Commercial building in Copenhagen, Denmark

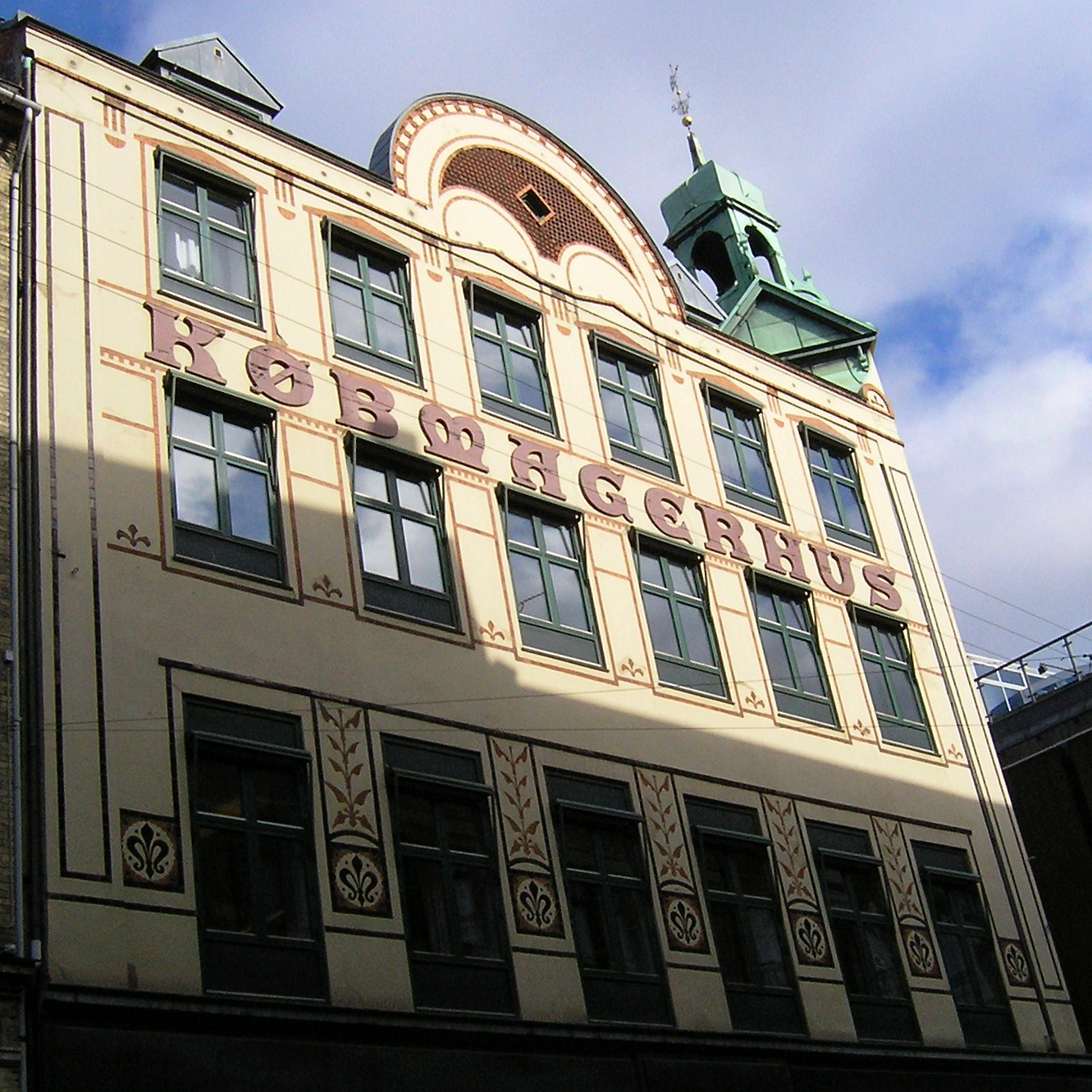
- Interactive map of the Købmagerhus area

General information
- Location: Copenhagen, Denmark
- Coordinates: 55°40′47.6″N 12°34′45.3″E
- Completed: 1898

Købmagerhus is a commercial building situated at the corner of the shopping street Købmagergade and Silkegade in central Copenhagen, Denmark, built in 1898 to a Jugend style design by Chr. Hansen. A plaque on the facade commemorates that Niels Steensen was born on the site. Copenhagen's first gentlemen's club, referred to variously as Fabricius' Club and "the club on Købmagergade", was based in the building.

== Architecture ==
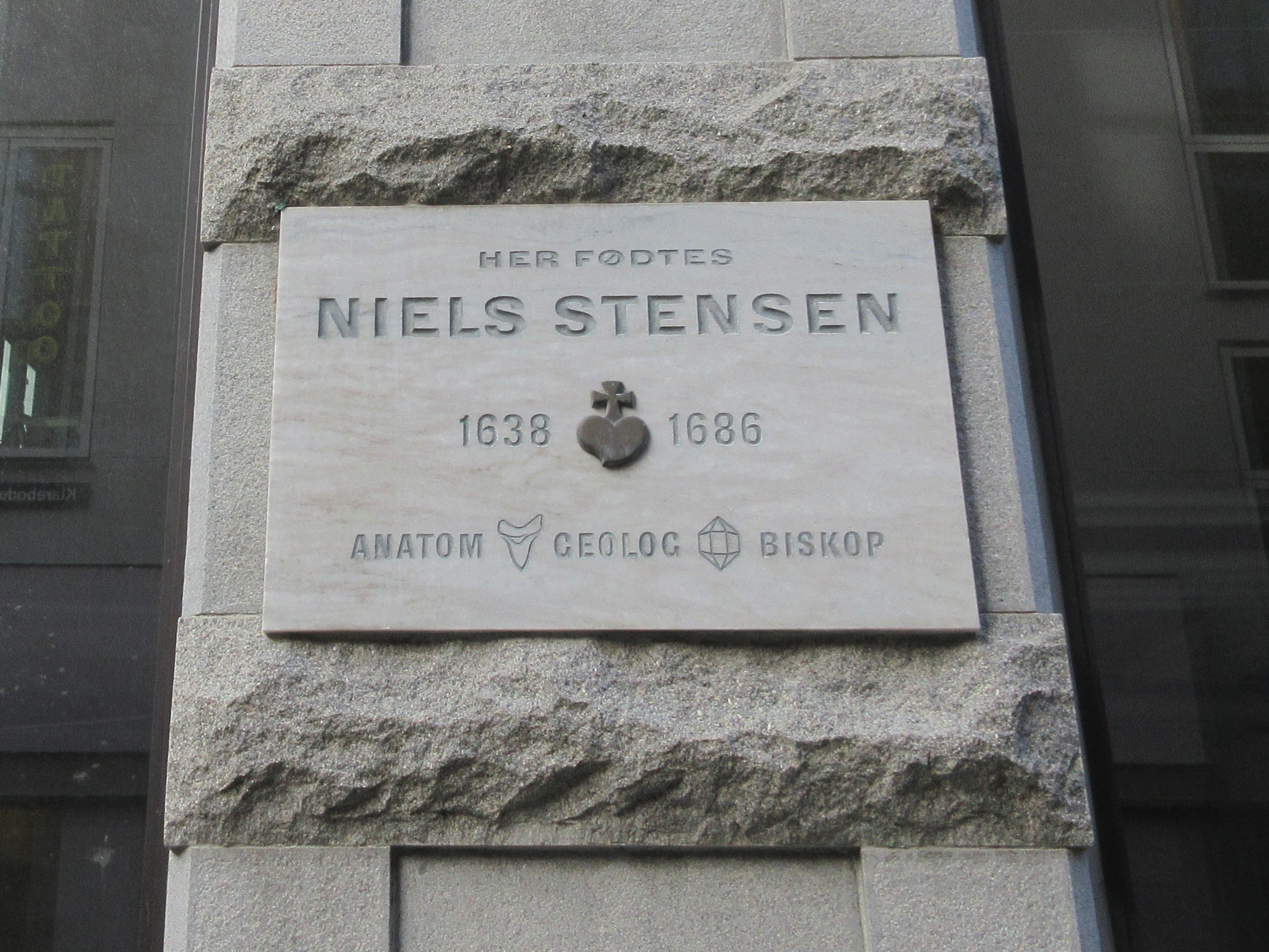
The Niels Steensen plaque.

Jøbmagerhus is a four-storey corner building, with a six-bay-long facade on Købmagergade, a 13-bay-long facade on Silkegade and a chamfered corner bay.The corner bay is crowned by a gabled wall dormer and a tall roof lantern.The facade on Købmagergade is crowned by a demi-circular wall dormer. The facade is on the first floor decorated with painted foliage ornamentation between the tall windows. A plaque on the side that faces Silkegade commemorates that Niels Steensen was born on the site.
