= Silkegade =

Street in Copenhagen, Denmark

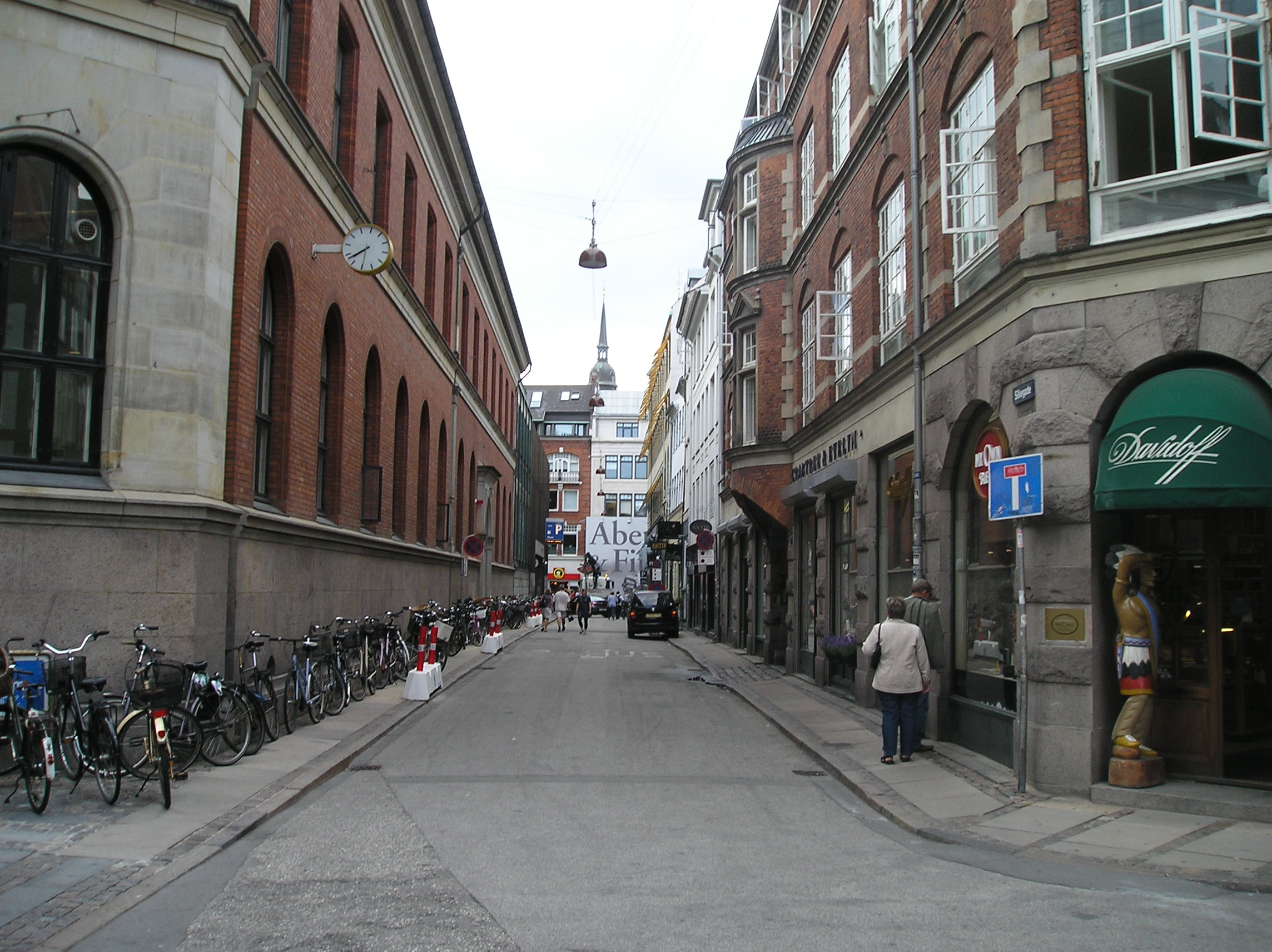
- Interactive map of Silkegade
- Location: Indre By, Copenhagen, Denmark
- Postal code: 1105
- Nearest metro station: Nørreport
- Coordinates: 55°40′47.8″N 12°34′47.86″E

Silkegade (lit. "Silk Street") is a minor street in the Old Town of Copenhagen, Denmark, linking busy shopping street Købmagergade in the west with Pilestræde in the east. Sparekassen Bikuben's former headquarters at No. 6–8 is listed on the Danish registry of protected buildings and places. The entrance to department store Illum's multi-storey parking facility is also located in the street.

== History ==
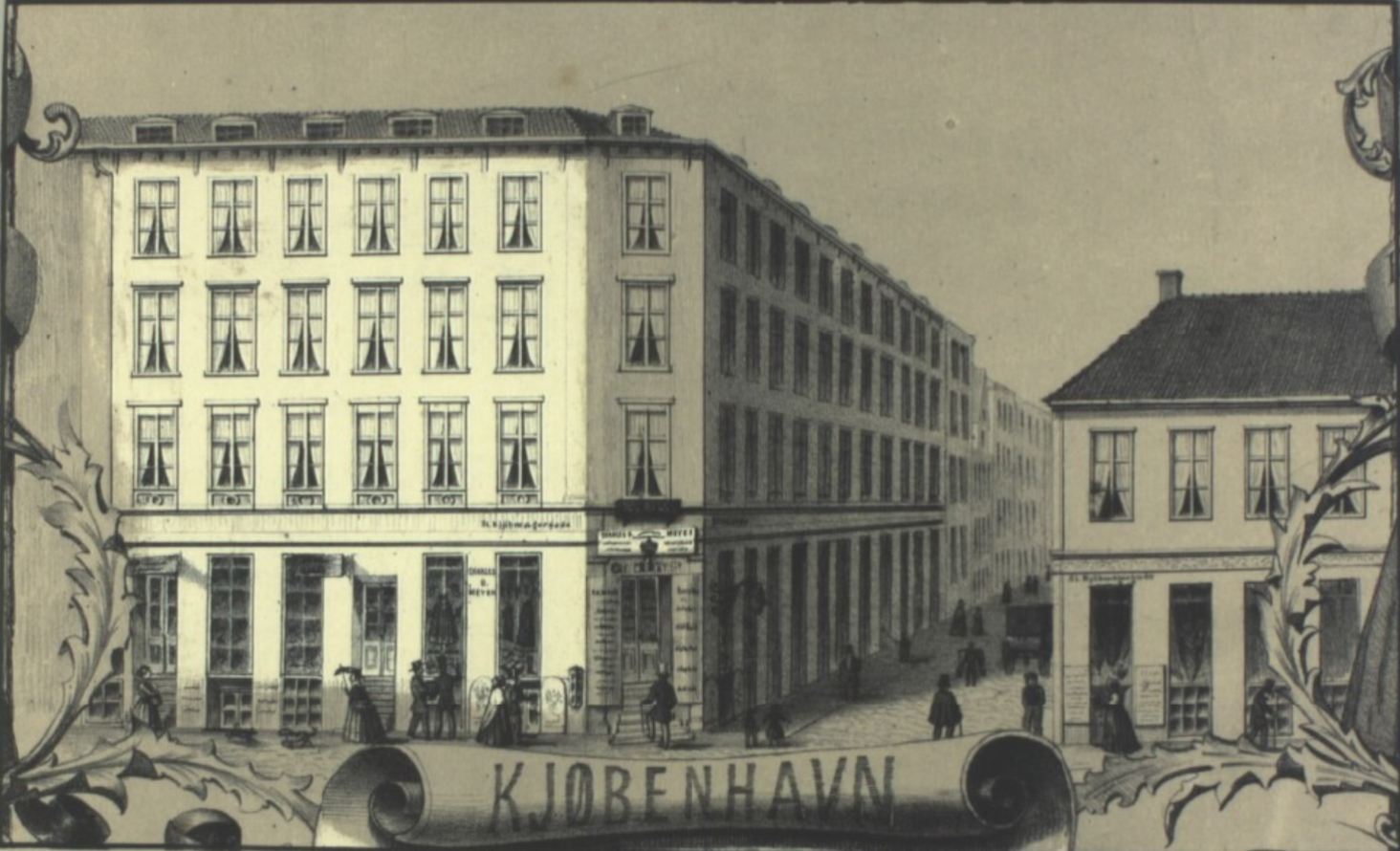
The street seen from Købmagergade

Created in 1620, the street takes its name after the Silk Company (Silkecompagniet) which was founded at the initiative of Christian IV in 1618. The company operated a silk manufactory at the corner with Pilestræde. A row of 14 identical houses with a total of 50 apartments was also constructed in the street. They were designed by Hans van Steenwinckel the Younger and used for housing a group of German silk weavers who had been called to Denmark by the king to boot the silk production. The Silk Company was most likely already shut down in 1631. Some of the townhouses and a building in Pilestræde were then converted into a domus misericordiæ or central poorhouse. It handed food and money out to the poor once a week and also functioned as an employment agency. It also contained a Hackle Room (heglestue) which was used for preparation of flax that was handed out to the poor. The facility relocated to Almindelig Hospital in 1769.

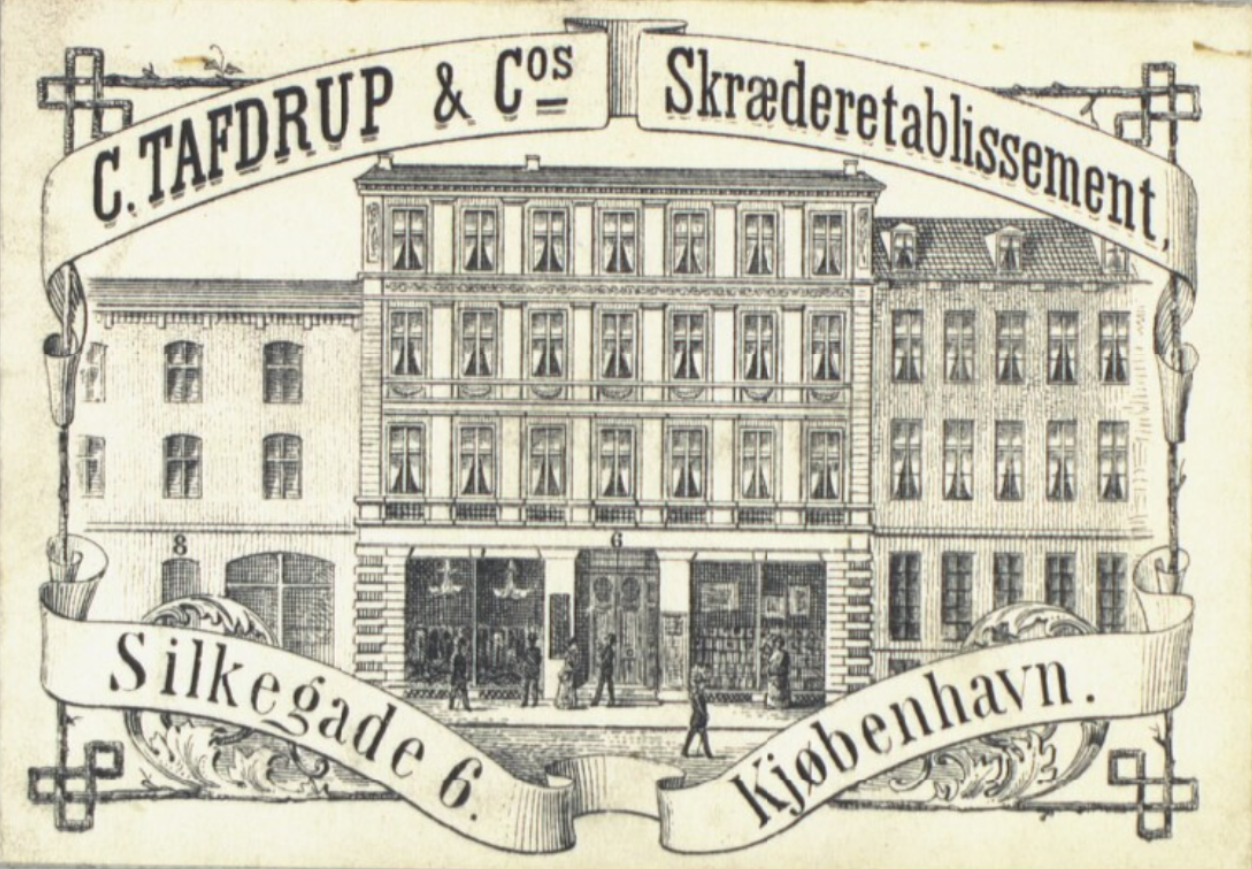
Advertisement for C, Tafdrup & Co.'s tailor shop at No. 6

Troels Marstrand took on the family's bakery in Silkegade in 1839. He sold it after a fire in 1856. In the middle of the 19th century, Poul Christian Tafdrup, a master tailor, operated a clothing retailer at No. 6. The family lived on the other side of the street at No. 5.

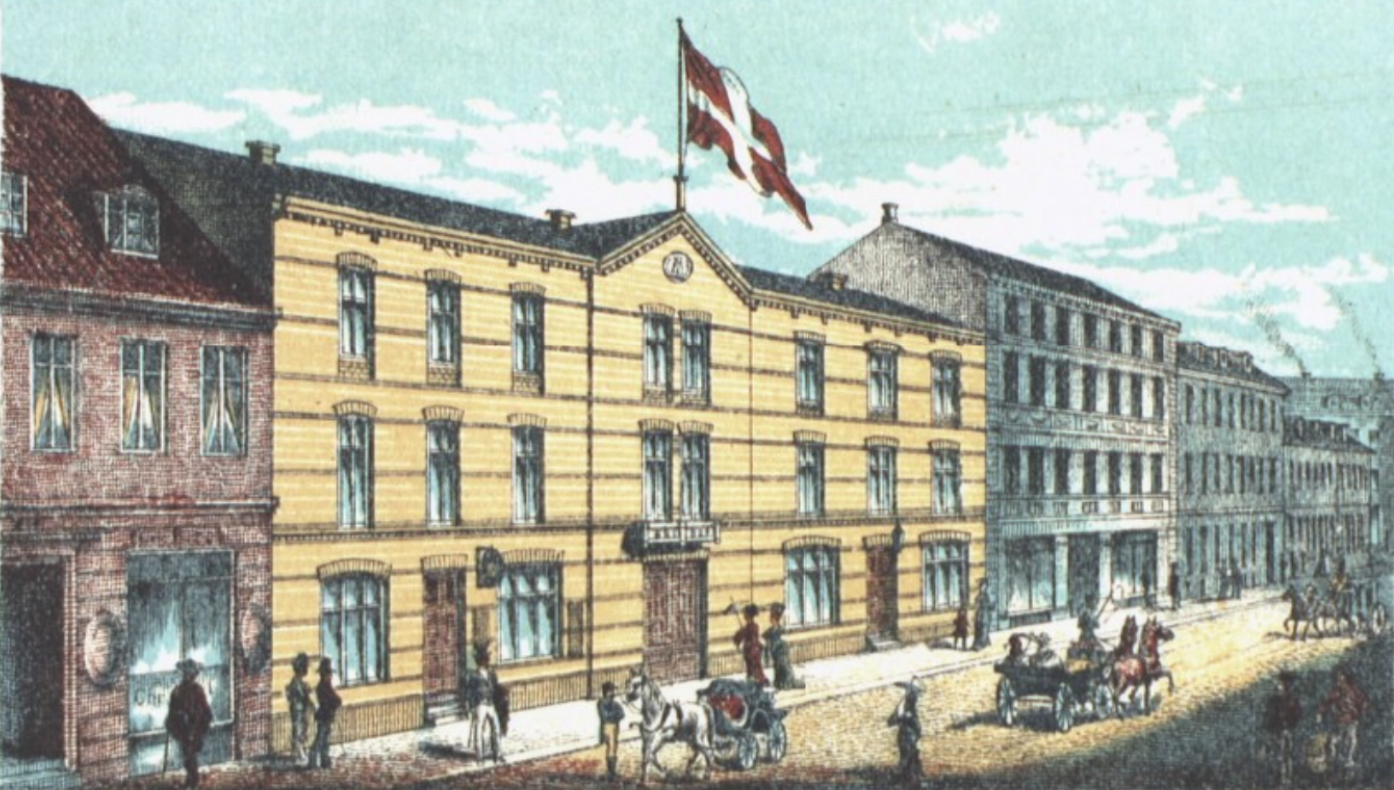
Bikuben's first headquarters from the 1860s

The savings bank Sparekassen Bikuben was founded in the street in 1857. It was initially operated out of bank manager Julius Hellmann's apartment at No. 13 but purchased the building at No. 8 in 1860. The architect Hans Conrad Stilling was subsequently charged with adapting the building for its new use as bank headquarters. It was replaced by a new building in the 1880s.

== Notable buildings ==
Sparekassen Bikuben's former headquarters (No. 6–8) is a four-winged complex surrounding a central courtyard. The oldest part of the complex is from 1881 to 1884 and was designed by Johan Daniel Herholdt. The corner building is from 1927 to 1929 and was designed by Gotfred Tvede. The youngest of the four wings is from 1959 and was designed by Poul Kjærgaard. The complex was listed on the Danish registry of protected buildings and places in 1999.

Department store Illum's multi-storey parking facility is located at No. 4. It was built in the 1960s. The Historicist corner building at No. 13 is from 1902 to 1905 and was designed by Phillip Smidth.

== Gallery ==
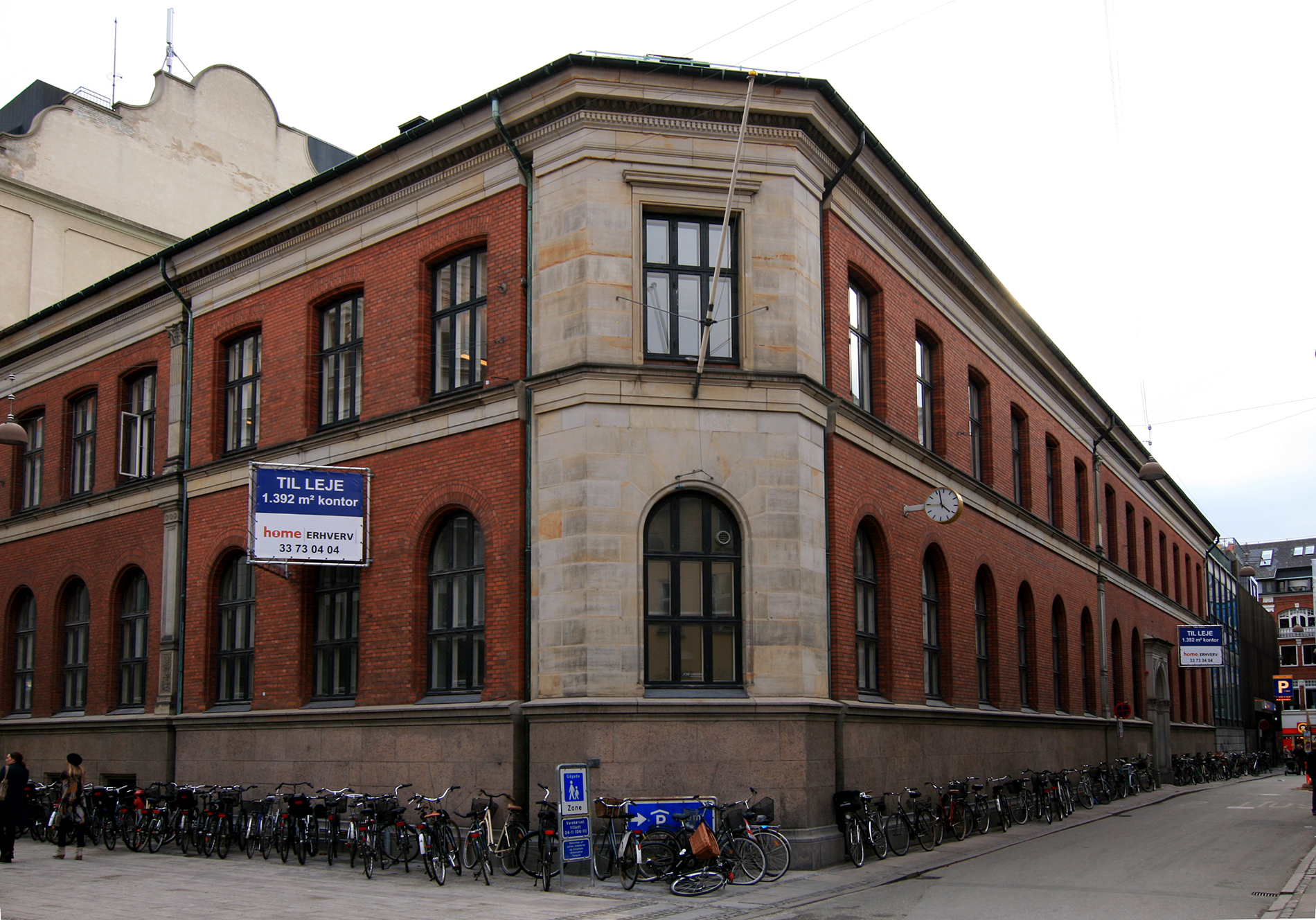
No. 6-8: Bikuben Building

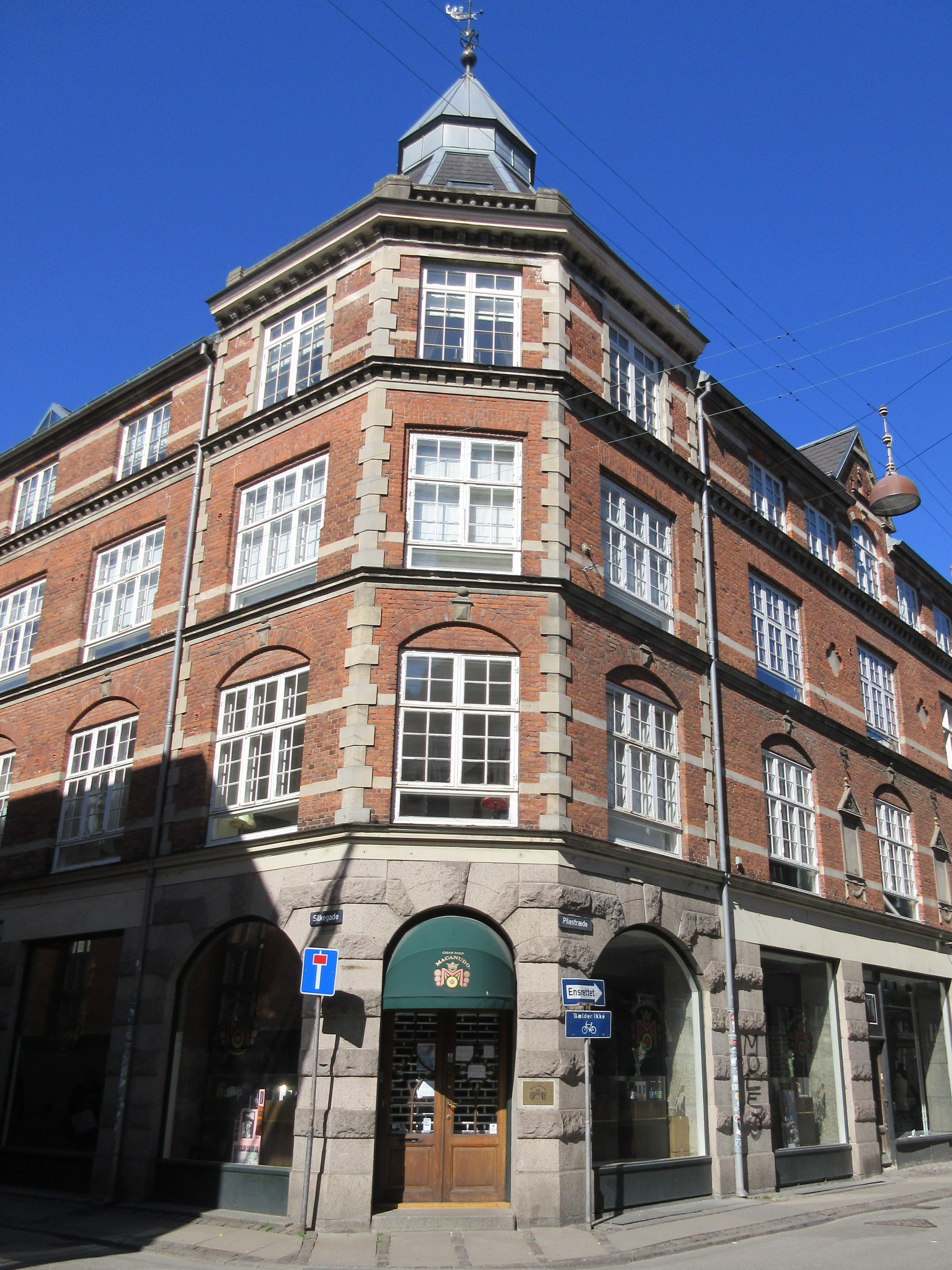
No. 13 (1905)

== See also ==
- Royal Danish Silk Manufactury
