= Rijkuo-Maja =

Sámi noaidi

Rijkuo-Maja or Rika Maja (Sami or Swedish for "Rich Maja"; 1661–1757) was a Sámi noaidi from Mausjaur. She was known for her influence and wealth in the contemporary Sámi community and became a famous figure of the Sámi history and the subject of several legends.

== Life ==
Rika Maja was from Mausjaur south of Arvidsjaur, and belonged to the forest sami of Arvidjsaur. She was married to Nils Hindersson (died before 1730) and had a daughter. She was the owner of over 3000 reindeer. She was famed for her great wealth in the contemporary Sámi community, and known by her sobriquet Rika Maja ('Rich Maja'). The surrounding Sámis were referred to as her vassals, and at the annual great winter market day, the Swedish merchants of Piteå were forced to ask for her permission to conduct trade with the Sámi people.

Rika Maja practiced Christianity in parallel with Sami shamanism, which were normal among the Sami people at this time period during the ongoing Christianization of the Sámi people. Adjusting to the law, which outlawed non Christian religion, she regularly attended church in Arvidsjaur, and presented as Christian in the presence of the Christian Swedish authorities. In private and in the presence of other Samis, she practiced the Sami religion. She had a Sieidi at the Akkanålke mountain, as well as sacrificial stone in the Mausjaur lake. She was active as a noaidi, and as such used a Sámi drum.

It has traditionally often been claimed that only men could become noaidi and use the drum, but several women are in fact noted to have done so, the most famous being Rijkuo-Maja of Arvidsjaur as well as Anna Greta Matsdotter of Vapsten, known as Silbo-gåmmoe or Gammel-Silba, were both noted to have done so. To acquire fishing luck for herself and her spouse, she reportedly sacrificed fish of the kind she wished to acquire on her sacrificial stone at Masjaur Lake.

On a famous occasion during a time of drought, she allegedly successfully summoned rain by performing a magic ritual. She was old at the time, and asked to be lead out to her sacrificial stone in the Mausjaur lake in ceremonial robe; after reaching the stone, she struck the water with a staff made of brass in prayer to the rain- and thunder god Horagalles, and according to legend, caused the rain to fall.

== Folklore and legend ==
Rika Maja is the subject of many legends. When she died in 1757, she asked to be given a Pagan funeral on the mountain so she could forever hear the reindeer hooves. Instead, her family gave her a Christian burial on the Arvidsjaur churchyard. After the burial, all of her thousands of reindeer, according to the legend, suddenly stormed toward the sea and did not stop until they were all drowned. In accordance to the legend, she buried a treasure of coins somewhere in the Akkanålke mountain.

== See also ==
- Lars Nilsson (shaman)
- Quiwe Baarsen
