= Eric Clauesson =

Swedish pagan

Eric Clauesson (or Erik Klasson; died 1492) was a Swedish man executed for sorcery, theft and heresy, though in reality he was executed for his paganism. His case illustrates the survival of the pre-Christian pagan Norse religion in Sweden as late as in the 15th century.

Clauesson worked as a servant to Hans Persson on the Swedish island of Värmdö. In 1492, he was put before the court in Stockholm, where he confessed that he had sworn himself to the old Nordic god Odin to escape poverty and that he had stolen from his master several times. This was a peculiar case; Clauesson was judged for paganism, which could be seen as a form of heresy, but officially for sorcery, an unusual crime in Sweden at this point, and it is hard to determine whether this was a witch trial or a trial of heresy. Clauesson himself clearly meant the old pagan god Odin, but Odin – like other pagan gods – was considered by the church to be a devil, so "Odin" was translated as "Satan" by the court, and Clauesson was thereby judged as a devil-worshipper. This was, by all accounts, a trial of heresy, against paganism.

The verdict was that he should be executed by the breaking wheel and hanged for the theft. For his other, religious crime, of "the highest matter" against "God and his immortal soul", he was sentenced to be burned at the stake; as the religious crime was more important than the theft, this was the punishment that was to be carried out. While Swedish law did not actually mention such crimes at the time, the verdict can be seen as a sign that the Catholic Church at that point held a strong position in Sweden, similar to that of the continent, where cases of heresy were more common.

Clauesson was not the only one to be put on trial for worshipping the old gods. On 27 October 1484, Ragvald Odenskarl (Ragvald The Follower of Odin, as the court called him) was put on trial in Stockholm for theft from several churches in Uppland; he claimed to have served Odin for seven years and named an accomplice, Johan Land. Odenskarl is believed to have been burned, while Land saved himself by asking to be an executioner.

== See also ==
- Lars Nilsson (Shaman)
- Erik Eskilsson
