= Quiwe Baarsen =

Sami shaman executed for witchcraft

Quiwe Baarsen (pronounced /ˈkiːviː/ KI-vi) (died 1627), was a North Sami shaman. He was one of 26 Sami people executed for witchcraft in Norway in the 17th century.

Baarsen was a Noaidi and a resident at Årøya, an island in the Altafjord just north of Alta.

In May 1627, he was put on trial in Hasvaag accused of having procured wind by use of magic for the sailor Niels Jonsen in 1625.

Baarsen claimed to have acted on commission of Jonsen, who needed wind to sail to Hasvaag, and described that he had wet his feet in water to create wind. Afterward, he was asked to repeat it by the wife of one of Jonsen's fishermen, which he did by throwing a pig into the sea. That time, however, the wind grew into a storm which caused the boat to sink. Baarsen explained that he was often hired to create wind. He denied having performed magic by the use of a Sami drum, but admitted that he had the knowledge to do so.

On 11 May 1627, Quiwe Baarsen was judged guilty of having caused five people to drown by the wind he had created by use of magic, and sentenced to be burned alive.

== See also ==
- Lars Nilsson (shaman)
- Anders Poulsen (shaman)
- Erik Eskilsson
- Christianization of the Sámi people
