= Aikia Aikianpoika =

Finnish Sami shaman (1591–1671)

Aikia Aikianpoika (Finnish) or Aike Aikesson (Swedish) (1591–1671), was a Sámi Shaman (noaidi) from Kuusamo near the Finnish Lapland. He was sentenced to death for witchcraft in Kuolajärvi and accused of having caused the death by drowning of a client Tobias Mordula by a curse. The client didn't pay for his services as promised. Rumors tells that thereafter, Aikia, who was imprisoned in Kemi, was alleged to have killed himself with witchcraft in order to avoid execution of the sentence. Aikia's case is one of the most famous trials and executions for witchcraft in Finland. This took place during the Christianization of the Sámi people.

He was from Kitka in Kemi. He was active as a noaidi, and as such used a Sámi drum. He was widely rumoured to be able to cause both good and evil by use of magic, and was engaged to do so by others.

In 1670, he was paid by a farmer to give him good salmon fishing luck. This succeeded, but the farmer did not pay sufficiently as promised. When the farmer died in 1671, Aikia Aikianpoika was reported by a parish vicar for having caused the death of the farmer by witchcraft. Aikia, not being a Christian and thereby not associating magic with Satan, freely confessed that he could master magic to the Christian authorities, who sentenced him to death for sorcery.

He was taken to Piteå to be executed, but the execution never took place, because he died in the sleigh on the way, likely by a heart attack.
