= Ragvald Odenskarl =

Swedish man executed for stealing

- Born: 15th-century AD; Sweden
- Died: 1484; Sweden
- Cause of death: Execution
- Other name: Ragnvald Odiakarl
- Known for: Stealing from churches in southern Uppland
- Criminal charges: Five counts of theft Five counts of sacrilege
- Penalty: Death by burning
- Accomplice: Johan Land

Ragvald Odenskarl or Ragnvald Odiakarl ('Ragnvald, Man of Odin'; died in 1484), was a Swede who was executed for stealing from churches in southern Uppland. As a declared follower of the Norse religion, Odiakarl's case is significant as it was very uncommon to openly declare oneself a "Pagan" during this period, and his testimony indicate that the old Pagan Norse religion were still practiced by some in Sweden as late as the 15th-century.

On 27 October 1484, Ragvald was put on trial in Stockholm for having stolen from churches in southern Uppland. Among them were Skepptuna Church (twice) Markims Church, Orkesta Church and Vallentuna Church. He admitted to have committed the thefts in collaboration with a male accomplice named Johan Land, who was then subsequently arrested. To steal from a church was during this period not considered an ordinary theft, but also an act of sacrilege. Ragvald himself declared, that he had served the old Norse god Odin for seven years and was thus not a Christian but a follower of the Norse religion.

Ragvald Odenskarl is believed to have been executed by burning. His accomplice Johan Land avoided execution by asking to be made an executioner.

== See also ==
- Eric Clauesson
- Lars Nilsson (shaman)
