= Northern Sámi =

Most widely spoken of all Sámi languages

- davvisámegiella
- Pronunciation: [ˈtavːiːˌsaːmeˌkie̯lːa]
- Native to: Norway, Sweden, Finland (Sápmi)
- Native speakers: (c. 25,000 cited 1992–2013)
- Language family: Uralic: Sámi; Western; Central; Northern Sámi
- Writing system: Latin (Northern Sámi alphabet); Northern Sámi Braille

Official status
- Official language in: Norway
- Recognised minority language in: Finland: Sapmi - Official within Sami homeland: Inari; Enontekiö; Utsjoki; Sodankylä; Sweden

Language codes
- ISO 639-1: se
- ISO 639-2: sme
- ISO 639-3: sme
- Glottolog: nort2671
- ELP: North Saami
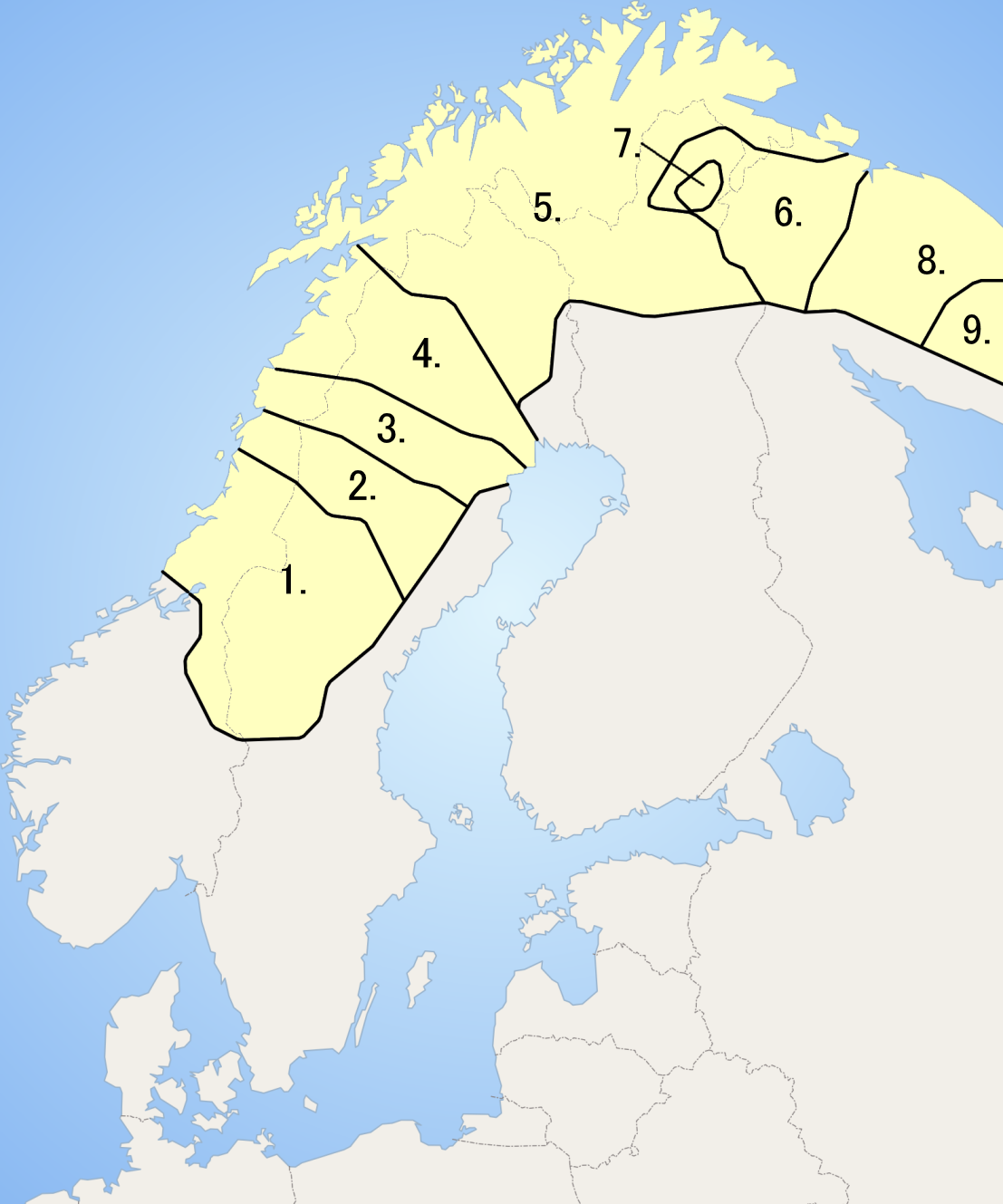
- Northern Sámi is 5 on this map.

- North Saami is classified as Definitely Endangered by the UNESCO Atlas of the World's Languages in Danger.

Speakers of Northern Sámi

Northern Sámi (or North Sámi; US: /ˈsɑːmi/ SAH-mee, UK: also /ˈsæmi/ SAM-ee; Northern Sami: davvisámegiella [ˈtavːiːˌsaːmeˌkie̯lːa]; Finnish: pohjoissaame [ˈpohjoi̯sˌsɑːme]; Norwegian: nordsamisk; Swedish: nordsamiska; disapproved exonym Lappish or Lapp) is the most widely spoken of all Sámi languages. The area where Northern Sámi is spoken covers the northern parts of Norway, Sweden and Finland.

== Geographic distribution ==
The number of Northern Sámi speakers is estimated to be somewhere between 15,000 and 25,000. About 2,000 of these live in Finland and between 5,000 and 6,000 in Sweden, with the remaining portions being in Norway.

Based on the highest estimates above of 18,000 speakers in Norway, and Statistics Norway estimating the total population of Norway to be 5,594,340 at the start of 2025, this gives the percentage of Northern Sámi speakers in Norway as approximately 0.32%. Similar calculations for Sweden and Finland give them as 0.05% and 0.03% respectively in those countries.

== History ==
Among the first printed Sámi texts is Swenske och Lappeske ABC Book ("Swedish and Lappish ABC book"), written in Swedish and what is likely a form of Northern Sámi. It was published in two editions in 1638 and 1640 and includes 30 pages of prayers and confessions of Protestant faith. It has been described as the first book "with a regular Sámi language form".

Northern Sámi was first described by Knud Leem (En lappisk Grammatica efter den Dialect, som bruges af Field-Lapperne udi Porsanger-Fiorden) in 1748 and in dictionaries in 1752 and 1768. One of Leem's fellow grammaticians, who had also assisted him, was Anders Porsanger, himself Sámi and in fact the first Sámi to receive higher education, who studied at the Trondheim Cathedral School and other schools, but who was unable to publish his work on Sámi due to racist attitudes at the time. The majority of his work has disappeared.

In 1832, Rasmus Rask published the highly influential Ræsonneret lappisk Sproglære ('Reasoned Sámi Grammar'), Northern Sámi orthography being based on his notation (according to E. N. Setälä).

No major official nationwide surveys on the distribution of speakers by municipality or county in Norway have been done. A 2000 survey by the Sami Language Council showed Kautokeino Municipality and Karasjok Municipality as 96% and 94% Sami-speaking respectively; should those percentages still be true as of the 2022 national population survey, this would result in 2,761 and 2,428 speakers respectively, virtually all of which being speakers of Northern Sámi. Tromsø Municipality has no speaker statistics despite having (as of June 2019) the largest voter roll in the 2021 Norwegian Sámi parliamentary election. A common urban myth is that Oslo has the largest Sámi population despite being nowhere near the core Sápmi area, but it had only the 5th largest voter roll in 2019.

=== Assimilation ===
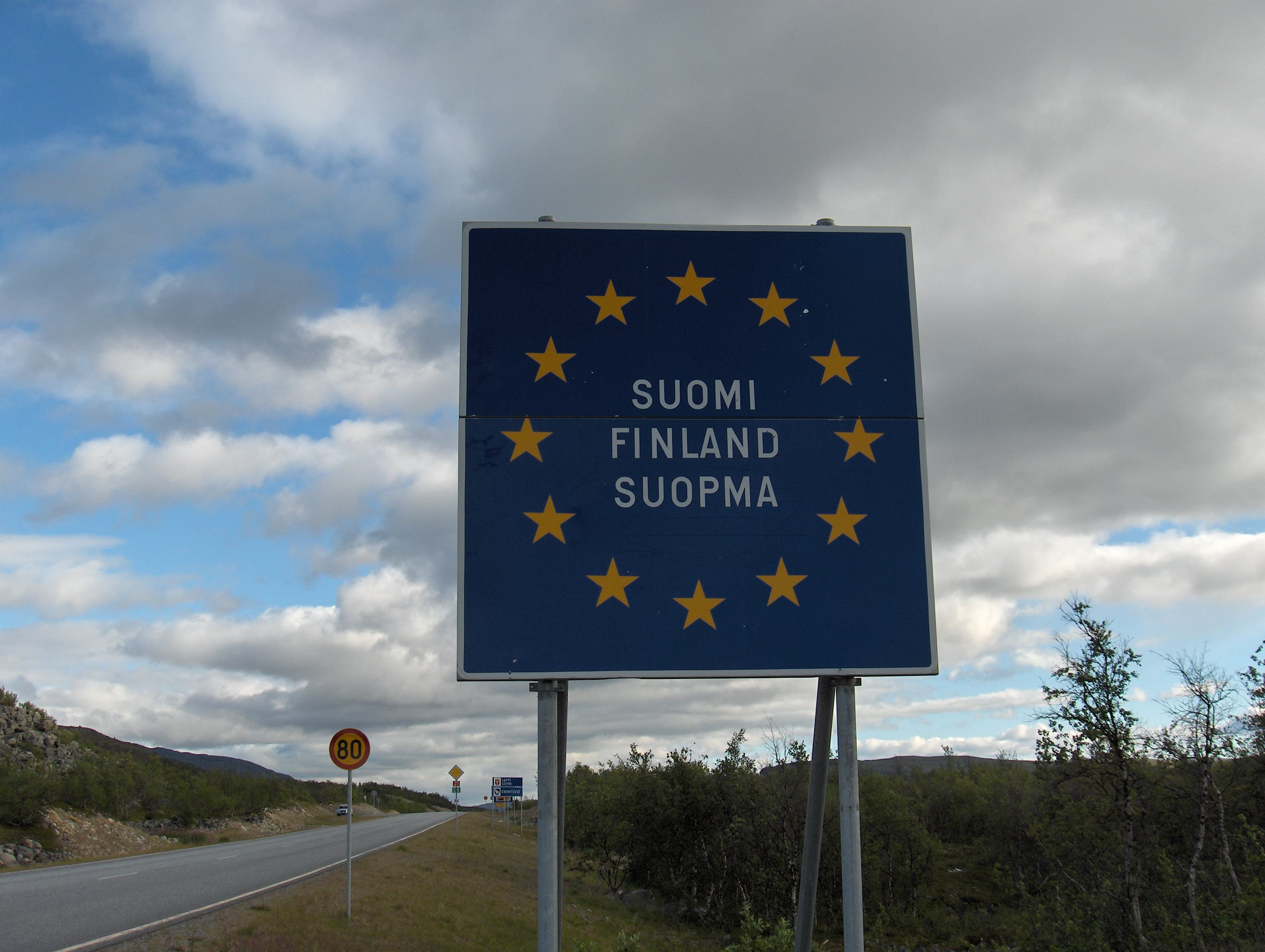
Trilingual international border sign (Finnish, Swedish and Northern Sámi) on the E8 road at the border between Norway and Finland, at Kilpisjärvi, Finland

The mass mobilization during the Alta controversy as well as a more tolerant political environment caused a change to the Norwegian policy of assimilation during the last decades of the twentieth century. In Norway, Northern Sámi is currently an official language in Troms and Finnmark counties along with eight municipalities (Guovdageaidnu, Kárášjohka, Unjárga, Deatnu, Porsáŋgu, Gáivuotna, Loabák and Dielddanuorri). Sámi born before 1977 have never learned to write Sámi according to the currently used orthography in school, so it is only in recent years that there have been Sámi capable of writing their own language for various administrative positions.

In the 1980s, a Northern Sámi Braille alphabet was developed, based on the Scandinavian Braille alphabet but with seven additional letters (á, č, đ, ŋ, š, ŧ, ž) required for writing in Northern Sámi.

== Phonology ==
=== Consonants ===
The consonant inventory of Northern Sámi is large, contrasting voicing for many consonants. Some analyses of Northern Sámi phonology may include preaspirated stops and affricates (/hp/, /ht/, /ht͡s/, /ht͡ʃ/, /hk/) and pre-stopped or pre-glottalised nasals (voiceless /pm/, /tn/, /tɲ/, /kŋ/ and voiced /bːm/, /dːn/, /dːɲ/, /ɡːŋ/). However, these can be treated as clusters for the purpose of phonology, since they are clearly composed of two segments and only the first of these lengthens in quantity 3. The terms "preaspirated" and "pre-stopped" will be used in this article to describe these combinations for convenience.

Northern Sámi consonants
		Labial	Dental	Alveolar	Postalveolar	Palatal	Velar
Nasal	voiced	m	n			ɲ	ŋ
Nasal	voiceless	m̥	n̥				(ŋ̊)
Plosive / Affricate	voiceless	p	t	t͡s	t͡ʃ	c	k
Plosive / Affricate	voiced	b	d	d͡z	d͡ʒ	ɟ	ɡ
Plosive / Affricate	postaspirated	pʰ	tʰ				kʰ
Fricative	voiceless	f	θ	s	ʃ		h
Fricative	voiced	v	ð				
Semivowel	voiced	v				j	
Semivowel	voiceless					j̥	
Lateral	voiced			l		ʎ	
Lateral	voiceless			l̥			
Trill	voiced			r			
Trill	voiceless			r̥			

Notes:

- Voiceless stops have voiced or partly voiced allophones when they occur adjacent to voiced sounds, and sometimes also word-initially.
- Stops before a homorganic nasal are realised as unreleased stops. Some, particularly younger, speakers instead realise voiceless stops as a glottal stop [ʔ] in this position, and decompose voiced stops into a homorganic nasal + glottal stop combination ([mʔ], [nʔ] etc.).
- /v/ is realised as a labiodental fricative [v] in the syllable onset (before a vowel), and is realised in the syllable coda (in a consonant cluster) as [f] before a stop in quantity 2, as bilabial [u ~ w] (or [β]) otherwise in quantity 2, and as [uf ~ wf] before a stop in quantity 3. Although [v] is a fricative, it behaves phonologically like an approximant, in particular like /j/.
- Quantity 3 geminated plain stops and affricates (written ⟨bb⟩, ⟨dd⟩, ⟨zz⟩, ⟨žž⟩, ⟨ddj⟩, ⟨gg⟩) are variously described as voiced (/bːb/, /dːd/, /dːd͡z/, /dːd͡ʒ/, /ɟːɟ/, /ɡːɡ/) or partly voiced (/bːp/, /dːt/, /dːt͡s/, /dːt͡ʃ/, /ɟːc/, /ɡːk/).
- Voiceless sonorants are very rare, but occur more frequently as allophonic realisations. A combination of sonorant followed by /h/ in the coda (/mh./, /nh./, /ŋh./, /vh./, /jh./, /lh./, /rh./), is realised as the equivalent voiceless sonorant (with /vh/ becoming /f/). Voiceless [ŋ̊] only occurs this way, and is quite rare.
- A combination of /h/ followed by a stop or affricate in the onset (/.hp/, /.ht/ etc.) is realised as preaspiration ([ʰp], [ʰt]).
- /θ/ is extremely rare.
- /d/ is realized as [ð] when it is between two unstressed syllables.
- The pronunciation of the cluster /tk/ varies between [tk], [θk], and [sk] depending on dialect.
- /tm/ can be pronounced [θm].

==== Dialectal variation ====
Not all Northern Sámi dialects have identical consonant inventories. Some consonants are absent from some dialects, while others are distributed differently.

- Western Finnmark lacks /ŋ/, using /ɲ/ in its place. This also applies to sequences of pre-stopped /ɡːŋ/ and /kŋ/, which become /dːɲ/ and /tɲ/ respectively. [ŋ] is retained before a velar consonant, but as an allophone of /n/.
- Eastern Finnmark does not have voiced pre-stopped nasals, replacing them with voiceless equivalents.
- Sea Sámi does not have pre-stopped nasals at all, having geminate nasals in their place.
- The postaspirated stops do not occur in Western Finnmark dialects, plain stops are used instead. They occur only in recent loanwords from the Scandinavian languages, and only before a stressed syllable when not next to another consonant.

==== Consonant length and gradation ====
Consonants, including clusters, that occur after a stressed syllable can occur in multiple distinctive length types, or quantities. These are conventionally labelled quantity 1, 2 and 3 or Q1, Q2 and Q3 for short. The consonants of a word alternate in a process known as consonant gradation, where consonants appear in different quantities depending on the specific grammatical form. Normally, one of the possibilities is named the strong grade, while the other is named weak grade. The consonants of a weak grade are normally quantity 1 or 2, while the consonants of a strong grade are normally quantity 2 or 3.

- Quantity 1 includes any single consonant. It originates from Proto-Samic single consonants in the weak grade.
- Quantity 2 includes any combination of consonants (including two of the same) with a short consonant in the coda of the preceding syllable (in Eastern Finnmark, any combination of consonants preceded by a long vowel or diphthong). It originates from Proto-Samic single consonants in the strong grade, as well as combinations of two consonants in the weak grade.
- Quantity 3 includes any combination of consonants (including two of the same) with a long consonant in the coda of the preceding syllable (in Eastern Finnmark, any combination of consonants preceded by a short vowel or diphthong). It originates from Proto-Samic combinations of two consonants in the strong grade.

Throughout this article and related articles, consonants that are part of different syllables are written with two consonant letters in IPA, while the lengthening of consonants in quantity 3 is indicated with an IPA length mark (ː).

Not all consonants can occur in every quantity type. The following limitations exist:

- Single /h/ is restricted to quantity 1, and does not alternate.
- Postaspirated consonants do not occur after a stressed syllable, and thus do not have any quantity distinctions.
- Voiced stops and affricates only occur in quantity 3. In quantity 1, voiced stops are allophones of the corresponding voiceless stops.
- /c/, /ɟ/ and /ʎ/ occur in quantity 2 and 3, but not in quantity 1.

When a consonant can occur in all three quantities, quantity 3 is termed "overlong".

In quantity 3, if the syllable coda consists of only /ð/, /l/ or /r/, the additional length of this consonant is realised phonetically as an epenthetic vowel. This vowel assimilates to the quality of the surrounding vowels:

- Between two rounded vowels (but not the diphthong /uo̯/) in the adjacent syllables, it becomes [o].
- Before a front vowel in the next syllable, it becomes [e], e.g. muorji /ˈmuo̯rː.jiː/, phonetically [ˈmŭŏ̯re.jiː].
- Otherwise, it becomes [a], e.g. silba /ˈsilː.pa/, phonetically [ˈsila.pa].

This does not occur if the second consonant is a dental/alveolar stop, e.g. gielda /ˈkie̯lː.ta/, phonetically [ˈkĭĕ̯lː.ta], or sálti /ˈsaːlː.htiː/, phonetically [ˈsaːlː.ʰtiː].

=== Vowels ===
Northern Sámi possesses the following vowels:

	Short vowels		Long vowels		Diphthongs		Half-long/ rising	
	Front	Back	Front	Back	Front	Back	Front	Back
Close	i	u	iː	uː	ie̯	uo̯	i̯e	u̯o
Mid	e	o	eː	oː	ea̯	oɑ̯	e̯a	o̯ɑ
Open	a		aː				aˑ	

Closing diphthongs such as ⟨ái⟩ also exist, but these are phonologically composed of a vowel plus one of the semivowels /v/ or /j/. The semivowels still behave as consonants in clusters.

Not all of these vowel phonemes are equally prevalent; some occur generally while others occur only in specific contexts as the result of sound changes. The following rules apply for stressed syllables:

- Short /i/, /a/, /o/ and /u/, the normal diphthongs, and the long vowel /aː/ occur generally.
- The other long vowels occur only in the context of diphthong simplification (below).
- Short /e/ is rare, and mostly occurs due to the combination of diphthong simplification plus stressed vowel shortening.
- Rising diphthongs and half-long /aˑ/ occur only due to unstressed vowel shortening in the next syllable.

The distribution in post-stressed syllables (unstressed syllables following a stressed one) is more restricted:

- Short /a/ and long /aː/, /iː/ and /uː/ occur generally.
- Short /e/ and /o/ occur more rarely, sometimes from Proto-Samic *i and *u and sometimes as a result of unstressed vowel shortening.
- Short /i/ and /u/ occur only before /j/.
- No diphthongs occur at all, nor do half-long /aˑ/ or long /eː/ and /oː/.

In a second unstressed syllable (one that follows another unstressed syllable), no long vowels occur and /a/, /i/ and /u/ are the only vowels that occur frequently.

The standard orthography of Northern Sámi distinguishes vowel length in the case of ⟨a⟩ /a/ versus ⟨á⟩ /aː/, although this is primarily on an etymological basis. Not all instances of ⟨á⟩ are phonemically long, due to both stressed and unstressed vowel shortening. Some dialects also have lengthening of ⟨a⟩ under certain circumstances. Nonetheless, a default length can be assumed for these two letters. For the remaining vowels, vowel length is not indicated in the standard orthography. In reference works, macrons can be placed above long vowels that occur in a position where they can be short. Length of ⟨i⟩ and ⟨u⟩ in a post-stressed syllable is assumed, and not indicated, except in the combinations ⟨ii⟩ and ⟨ui⟩, where these letters can also indicate short vowels.

==== Dialectal variation ====
The Eastern Finnmark dialects possess additional contrasts that other dialects of Northern Sámi do not:

- There is a maximally three-way contrast among open vowels between /æ/, /a/ and /ɑ/, both short and long.
  - The vowel spelled ⟨a⟩ is /ɑ/ in stressed syllables, /a/ in unstressed syllables.
  - The vowel spelled ⟨á⟩ is /a/ in stressed syllables if the next syllable has a back vowel (including ⟨a⟩ but not ⟨á⟩), and /æ/ everywhere else (including all unstressed syllables).
- In other eastern varieties, only a two-way contrast between /æ/ and /ɑ/ is found. Jarvansalo (2006) reports the Kárášjohka dialect following this contrast, but having /ɑ/ for ⟨á⟩, /ɒ/ for stressed ⟨a⟩.
- There is a length contrast between short and long diphthongs. In other dialects, this distinction exists as well, but is allophonic.

Some Torne dialects have /ie̯/ and /uo̯/ instead of stressed /eː/ and /oː/ (from diphthong simplification) as well as unstressed /iː/ and /uː/.

=== Phonological processes ===
==== Diphthong simplification ====
Diphthongs can undergo simplification when the following syllable contains short e, short o, ii /ij/, or ui /uj/. This means that only the first vowel of the diphthong remains, which also undergoes lengthening before grade 1 and 2 consonant clusters and geminates. Note that some instances of e, o, and ui (specifically /uːj/) do not cause simplification. Below are some examples:

- ie → ī: viehkat /ˈvie̯h.kat/ "to run" → vīhken /ˈviːh.ken/ "I ran"
- ea → ē: geassi /ˈkea̯s.siː/ "summer" → gēsiid /ˈkeː.sijt/ "of the summers"
- oa → ō: goarrut /ˈkoɑ̯r.ruːt/ "to sew" → gōrro /ˈkoːr.ro/ "they sew"
- uo → ū: muorra /ˈmuo̯r.ra/ "tree" → mūrrii /ˈmuːr.rij/ "into the tree"

==== Unstressed vowel shortening ====
Shortening of long vowels in unstressed syllables occurs irregularly. It commonly occurs in the first element of a compound word, in a fourth syllable, and in various other unpredictable circumstances. When shortened, /iː/ and /uː/ are lowered to /e/ and /o/, except before /j/. Shortened vowels are denoted here, and in other reference works, with an underdot: ạ, ẹ, ọ, to distinguish them from originally-short vowels.

When a long vowel or diphthong occurs in the stressed syllable before the shortened vowel, it becomes half-long/rising.

- boaráseamọs /ˈpoɑ̯.raː.se̯a.mos/ "oldest" (nom. sg.) ~ boarásēpmosa /ˈpoɑ̯.raː.seːp.mo.sa/ (acc. sg.)
- baluheapmẹ /ˈpa.luː.he̯ap.me/ "fearless" (nom. sg.) ~ baluhēmiid /ˈpa.luː.heː.mijt/ (acc. pl.)

When the consonant preceding the shortened vowel is quantity 3, any lengthened elements are shortened so that it becomes quantity 2. However, the resulting consonant is not necessarily the weak-grade equivalent of that consonant. If the consonant was previously affected by consonant lengthening (below), this process shortens it again.

- eadni /ˈea̯dː.niː/ "mother" → eadnẹspiidni /ˈe̯ad.neˌspijːt.niː/ "mother pig"; contrast the weak grade in eatni /ˈea̯t.niː/
- jahki /ˈjahː.kiː/ "year" → jahkẹbealli /ˈjah.keˌpea̯l.liː/ "half-year"

==== Stressed vowel shortening ====
In the Eastern Finnmark dialects, long vowels as well as diphthongs are shortened before a quantity 3 consonant. This is phonemic due to the loss of length in quantity 3 in these dialects.

- eadni /ˈĕă̯t.niː/ "mother" (nom. sg.) ~ etniid /ˈet.nijt/ (gen. pl.)
- guoika /ˈkŭŏ̯j.hka/ "waterfall" (nom. sg.) ~ guikii /ˈkuj.hkij/ (ill. sg.)
- oahppa /ˈŏɑ̯̆h.pa/ "teaching" (nom. sg.) ~ oahpa /ˈoɑ̯h.pa/ (acc. sg.)
- guosˈsi /ˈɡŭŏ̯s.siː/ "guest" (nom. sg.) ~ guossi /ˈɡuo̯s.siː/ (acc. sg.)
- áhkku /ˈah.kuː/ "grandmother" (nom. sg.) ~ áhku /ˈaːh.kuː/ (acc. sg.)

Outside Eastern Finnmark, long /aː/ is only shortened before a long preaspirate, not before any other consonants. The shortening of diphthongs remains allophonic due to the preservation of quantity 3 length, but the shortening of long vowels that result from diphthong simplification is phonemic.

==== Stressed vowel lengthening ====
In the Eastern Finnmark dialects, short vowels are lengthened when they occur before a quantity 1 or 2 consonant. Combined with the preceding change, vowel length in stressed syllables becomes conditioned entirely by the following consonant quantity. Moreover, because the coda lengthening in quantity 3 is lost in these dialects, vowel length becomes the only means for distinguishing quantities 3 and 2 in many cases.

- lohkka /ˈloh.ka/ "lock" (nom. sg.) ~ lohka /ˈloːh.ka/ (acc. sg.)
- gazza /ˈkɑd.d͡za/ "nail" (nom. sg.) ~ gacca /ˈkɑːt.t͡sa/ (acc. sg.)
- busˈsá /ˈpus.sæː/ "cat" (nom. sg.) ~ bussá /ˈpuːs.sæː/ (acc. sg.)

==== Lengthening of unstressed short /a/ ====
In the Western Finnmark dialects, a short /a/ in a post-stressed syllable is lengthened to /aː/ if the preceding consonants are quantity 1 or 2, and the preceding syllable contains a short vowel. Compare the Eastern Finnmark pronunciations of these words under "stressed vowel lengthening".

- lohkka /ˈlohː.ka/ "lock" (nom. sg.) ~ lohka /ˈloh.kaː/ (acc. sg.).
- gazza /ˈkadː.d͡za/ "nail" (nom. sg.) ~ gacca /ˈkat.t͡saː/ (acc. sg.)
- balva /ˈpalː.va/ "cloud" (nom. sg.) ~ balvva /ˈpalv.vaː/ (acc. sg.)

A long /aː/ that originates from this process does not trigger consonant lengthening.

==== Consonant lengthening ====
In dialects outside Eastern Finnmark, in quantity 2, the last coda consonant is lengthened if the following vowel is long, and the preceding vowel is a short monophthong. Since the coda now contains a long consonant, it is considered as quantity 3, but the lengthening is mostly allophonic and is not indicated orthographically. It is phonemic in the Western Finnmark dialects when the following vowel is /aː/, because lengthening is triggered by an original long /aː/ but not by an original short /a/ that was lengthened (as described above).

The new consonant may coincide with its Q3 consonant gradation counterpart, effectively making a weak grade strong, or it may still differ in other ways. In particular, no change is made to syllable division, so that in case of Q2 consonants with a doubled final consonant, it is actually the first of this pair that lengthens, making it overlong.

- jahki /ˈjahː.kiː/ "year" (nom. sg.) ~ jagi /ˈja.ɡiː/ (acc. sg.)
- ballu /ˈpalː.luː/ "fear" (nom. sg.) ~ balu /ˈpa.luː/ (acc. sg.)
- submi /ˈsubː.miː/ "sum" (nom. sg.) ~ supmi /ˈsupː.miː/ (acc. sg.); contrast skábma /ˈskaːbː.ma/ "polar night" ~ skápma /ˈskaːp.ma/ (acc. sg.)
- čalbmi /ˈtʃalː.pmiː/ "eye" (nom. sg.) ~ čalmmi /ˈtʃalmː.miː/ (acc. sg.); contrast bálbma /ˈpaːlː.pma/ "palm tree" ~ bálmma /ˈpaːlm.ma/ (acc. sg.)
- loddi /ˈlodː.diː/ "bird" (nom. sg.) ~ lotti /ˈlotː.tiː/ (acc. sg.); contrast bodda /ˈpodː.da/ "period" ~ botta /ˈpot.ta/ (acc. sg.)

Lengthening also occurs if the preceding vowel is a close diphthong /ie̯/ or /uo̯/. In this case, the diphthong also shortens before the new quantity 3 consonant.

- duoddi /ˈtuo̯dː.diː/, phonetically [ˈtŭŏ̯dː.diː] "protection" (nom. sg.) ~ duotti /ˈtuo̯tː.tiː/, phonetically [ˈtŭŏ̯tː.tiː] (acc. sg.); contrast luodda "track, trail" /ˈluo̯dː.da/, phonetically [ˈlŭŏ̯dː.da] ~ luotta /ˈluo̯t.ta/ (acc. sg.) with no lengthening.
- gieddi /ˈkie̯dː.diː/, phonetically [ˈkĭĕ̯dː.diː] "field" (nom. sg.) ~ gietti /ˈkie̯tː.tiː/, phonetically [ˈkĭĕ̯tː.tiː] (acc. sg.)

=== Prosody ===
Stress is generally not phonemic in Northern Sámi; the first syllable of a word always carries primary stress. Like most Sámi languages, Northern Sámi follows a pattern of alternating (trochaic) stress, in which each odd-numbered syllable after the first is secondarily stressed and even-numbered syllables are unstressed. The last syllable of a word is never stressed, unless the word has only one syllable.

Consequently, words can follow three possible patterns:

- A single stressed syllable.
- An even number of syllables: Ending in a stressed odd-numbered syllable followed by an unstressed even-numbered syllable.
- An odd number of syllables: Ending in a stressed odd-numbered syllable followed by an unstressed even-numbered syllable, and an unstressed odd-numbered (final) syllable.

This gives the following pattern, which can be extended indefinitely in theory. S indicates stress, _ indicates no stress:

- S
- S _
- S _ _
- S _ S _
- S _ S _ _
- S _ S _ S _
- etc.

The number of syllables, and the resulting stress pattern, is important for grammatical reasons. Words with stems having an even number of syllables from the last inflect differently from words with stems having an odd number of syllables. This is detailed further in the grammar section.

In compound words, which consist of several distinct word roots, each word retains its own stress pattern, potentially breaking from the normal trochaic pattern. If the first element of a compound has an odd number of syllables, then there will be a sequence of two unstressed syllables followed by a stressed one, which does not occur in non-compound words. In some cases, the first element of a compound has only one syllable, resulting in two adjacent stressed syllables. Hence, stress is lexically significant in that it can distinguish compounds from non-compounds.

Recent loanwords generally keep the stress of the language they were borrowed from, assigning secondary stress to the syllable that was stressed in the original word. The normal trochaic pattern can also be broken in this case, but words will still be made to fit into the even or odd inflection patterns. Words with penultimate stress ending in a consonant will follow the odd inflection:

- nēon /ˈneː.on/ "neon"
- apostal /ˈaˌposː.tal/ "apostle"

Words with antepenultimate or earlier stress will have the stress modified, as this is not allowed in Northern Sámi:

- anánas /ˈaˌnaː.nas/ "pineapple"
- Afrihkká /ˈafˌrihː.kaː/ "Africa"
- Amerihkká /ˈa.meˌrihː.kaː/ "America"

Final stress is not allowed, so if the original word has final stress, an extra dummy syllable (generally a) is added in Northern Sámi to avoid this.

- biila /ˈpijːla/ "car"
- bomba /ˈpomːpa/ "bomb"
- kultuvra /ˈkulˌtuvː.ra/ "culture"
- advearba /ˈatˌvea̯rː.pa/ "adverb"
- tomáhtta /ˈtoˌmaːhː.ta/ "tomato"
- advokáhta /ˈat.voˌkaːh.ta/ "lawyer"
- kapasitēhta /ˈka.pa.siˌteːh.ta/ "capacity"
- matematihkka /ˈma.te.maˌtihː.ka/ "mathematics"

As a result of retaining the original stress pattern, some loanwords have sequences of three unstressed syllables, which do not occur in any other environment:

- spesialisēret /ˈspe.si.a.li.ˌseː.reh(t)/ "to specialise"
- teoretisēret /ˈte.o.re.ti.ˌseː.reh(t)/ "to theorise"
- administrašuvdna /ˈat.mi.ni.stra.ˌʃuvː.tna/ "administration"

Conjunctions, postpositions, particles, and monosyllabic pronouns tend to be unstressed altogether, and therefore fall outside the above rules.

== Dialects ==
Sammallahti divides Northern Sámi dialects into certain regions as follows:

- Finnmark dialects
  - Western Finnmark: eastern Enontekiö, northern Sodankylä, and part of Inari in Finland plus Kautokeino and Alta in Norway
  - Eastern Finnmark: Utsjoki and part of Inari in Finland plus Karasjok, Porsanger, and Tana in Norway
- Torne dialects
  - Finnish Wedge: western Enontekiö in Finland plus Skibotnelva, Gálggojávri, and Nordreisa in Norway
  - Karesuando: Könkämävuoma and Lainiovuoma in Sweden plus Lyngen and Balsfjord in Norway
  - Jukkasjärvi: Saarivuoma, Talma, Rautasvuoma and Kaalasvuoma in Sweden plus Vågsfjord and Ofotfjord in Norway
  - Kaitum: Norrkaitum and Mellanbyn in Sweden
- Sea Sámi

The written language is primarily based on the western Finnmark dialects, with some elements from the eastern Finnmark dialects.

=== Western Finnmark dialects ===
Features of the western Finnmark dialects are:

- Merging of the velar nasals into the palatal nasals, except before a (plain or preaspirated) homorganic stop.
- Lengthening of short /a/ when the preceding syllable contains a short vowel and a quantity 1 or 2 consonant. This new long /aː/ does not trigger consonant lengthening.
- Kautokeino: Merging of /ɟ/ into /tʃ/.
- Kautokeino: Assibilation of /θ/ into /s/.

=== Eastern Finnmark dialects ===
The eastern Finnmark dialects have the following characteristics:

- Lengthening of stressed vowels before quantity 1 and 2 consonants.
- Shortening of the first element of quantity 3 consonants, merging them with quantity 2 consonants (unless the second element of the corresponding Q2 consonant is doubled, which keeps them distinct). Combined with the previous change, this causes Q3-Q2 gradation in Eastern Finnmark to become primarily about vowel length rather than consonant length.
- A distinction between /a/ and /ɑ/, the former spelled ⟨á⟩ and reflecting Proto-Samic *ā, the latter spelled ⟨a⟩ and reflecting Proto-Samic *ë.
- Fronting of /a/ to /æ/ in unstressed syllables.
- Umlaut: fronting of vowels before a following front vowel in the second syllable (including /æ/ produced by the previous change).
  - /a/ is fronted to /æ/.
  - /ea̯/ is fronted to /eæ̯/.
  - /oɑ̯/ is fronted to /oæ̯/.
  - /uo̯/ is fronted to /ue̯/.
- Between vowels, lenition of /b/ to /v/, and of /ɡ/ to /ɣ/, which in modern speech becomes /j/ between a stressed vowel and a front vowel, and zero otherwise.
- Raising of the non-close diphthongs /ea̯/ and /oɑ̯/.
  - Along the lower Tana river, these merge entirely with standard /ie̯/ and /uo̯/, resulting in /iɑ̯/ and /uɑ̯/ (when not fronted) or /iæ̯/ and /uæ̯/ (when fronted).
  - Along the upper Tana, the non-close diphthongs are only raised before single and (original) geminate consonants, and they may or may not merge with original /ie̯/ and /uo̯/.
  - In dialects south of Tana bru, only fronted /eæ̯/ and /oæ̯/ are raised to /iæ̯/ and /uæ̯/.

=== Torne dialects ===
- Jukkasjärvi, Karesuando, Finnish Wedge: Loss of distinction between postalveolar and plain alveolar consonants, with the result being alveolar in Karesuando and postalveolar in the Finnish Wedge.
- Use of -n instead of -s in the locative singular. This originates from the old inessive case, whereas the standard ending is from the old elative case.
- Use of -o instead of -u in the third-person singular present tense.
- Jukkasjärvi and Kaitum: Use of -is instead of -in in the locative plural. Again, these originate from two different older cases.
- Karesuando: Long /eː/ and /oː/ from diphthong simplification are re-diphthongised to /ie̯/ and /uo̯/.
- Jukkasjärvi and Karesuando: Raising of short /a/ to /e/ before /j/ and /v/.
- Jukkasjärvi and Karesuando: /ie̯/ and /uo̯/ instead of standard long /iː/ and /uː/ in post-stressed syllables.
- All except Finnish Wedge: /ɡd/ and /ɡdʒ/ instead of standard /vd/ and /vdʒ/ from the Proto-Samic clusters *mt and *mč.

=== Sea Sámi dialects ===
- Lack of fortition in strong-grade nasals and glides, thus /mː/, /nː/, /ɲː/, /ŋː/ rather than /pm/, /tn/, /tɲ/ and /kŋ/.
- Use of -st instead of -s in the locative singular.
- Eastern Sea Sámi: Loss of distinction between postalveolar and plain alveolar consonants.

== Orthography ==
Northern Sámi has a long orthographic history, which includes no fewer than 9 Latin alphabets.

=== History ===
The roots of the current orthography for Northern Sámi were laid by Rasmus Rask who, after discussions with Nils Vibe Stockfleth, published Ræsonneret lappisk sproglære efter den sprogart, som bruges af fjældlapperne i Porsangerfjorden i Finmarken. En omarbejdelse af Prof. Knud Leems Lappiske grammatica in 1832. Rask opted for a phonemic orthographic system. All of the orthographies that have been used for Northern Sámi trace their roots back to Rask's system, unlike the orthographies used for Lule and Southern Sámi, which are mainly based on the orthographical conventions of Swedish and Norwegian. Following in the tradition of Rask meant that diacritics were used with some consonants (⟨č⟩, ⟨đ⟩, ⟨ŋ⟩, ⟨š⟩, ⟨ŧ⟩ and ⟨ž⟩), which caused data-processing problems before Unicode was introduced. Both Stockfleth and J. A. Friis went on to publish grammar books and dictionaries for Sámi. It can be said that Northern Sámi was better described than Norwegian was before Ivar Aasen published his Grammar of the Norwegian Dialects.

Northern Sámi was and is used in three countries, each of which used its own orthography for years. Friis' orthography was used when work on translating the Bible into Northern Sámi commenced, in the first Sámi newspaper called Saǥai Muittalægje, and in the Finnemisjonen's own newspaper Nuorttanaste. The groundwork for Northern Sámi lexicography was laid by Konrad Nielsen who used an orthography of his own creation in his dictionary Lappisk ordbok. Starting in 1948, the orthographies used in Norway and Sweden were combined into a single Bergsland-Ruong orthography. It was not greatly used in Norway. In 1979, an official orthography for Northern Sámi was adopted for use in Norway, Sweden and Finland.

Thus, until the official orthography currently in use was adopted in 1979, each country had its own, slightly different standard, so it is quite possible to come across older books that are difficult to understand for people unacquainted with the orthography:

1. Maanat leät poahtan skuvllai.
2. Mánát leat boahtán skuvlii.

(The children have come to school.)

The first sentence is from Antti Outakoski's Samekiela kiellaoahpa from 1950; the second one is how it would be written according to the current orthography.

=== Alphabet ===
The most recent alphabet was approved in 1979 and last modified in 1985:

Letter	Name	Phoneme(s)	English approximation	Notes
A a	a	/a/	spa	Also /aː/ in Western Finnmark. In Eastern Finnmark, /ɑ/ or /ɑː/ in stressed syllables, /a/ or /aː/ in unstressed syllables.
Á á	á	/aː/, /a/	chai	In Eastern Finnmark, also /æ/ or /æː/.
B b	be	/p/, /b/	bat	/b/ in the combinations ⟨bb⟩ and ⟨bm⟩.
C c	ce	/ts/, /hts/	lets	/hts/ after a voiced consonant.
Č č	če	/tʃ/, /htʃ/	chew	/htʃ/ after a voiced consonant.
D d	de	/t/, /d/, /ð/	do	/d/ in the combinations ⟨dd⟩, ⟨dn⟩ and ⟨dnj⟩. /ð/ between two unstressed vowels.
Đ đ	đe	/ð/	this	
E e	e	/e/, /eː/	sleigh	
F f	áf	/f/	fun	
G g	ge	/k/, /ɡ/	go	/ɡ/ in the combinations ⟨gg⟩ and ⟨gŋ⟩. In Western Finnmark, /d/ in ⟨gŋ⟩ instead.
H h	ho	/h/	he	
I i	i	/i/, /iː/, /j/	he	/j/ after a vowel.
J j	je	/j/	yes	
K k	ko	/k/, /hk/, /kʰ/	cat	/hk/ after a voiced consonant. /kʰ/ at the beginning of a stressed syllable.
L l	ál	/l/	lip	
M m	ám	/m/	myth	
N n	án	/n/	no	
Ŋ ŋ	áŋ	/ŋ/	sing	/ɲ/ in Western Finnmark, except before a velar stop.
O o	o	/o/, /oː/	go	
P p	pe	/p/, /hp/, /pʰ/	park	/hp/ after a voiced consonant. /pʰ/ at the beginning of a stressed syllable.
R r	ár	/r/	(trilled) rat	
S s	ás	/s/	sip	
Š š	áš	/ʃ/	shed	
T t	te	/t/, /ht/, /tʰ/, /h(t)/, /θ/	told	/ht/ after a voiced consonant. /tʰ/ at the beginning of a stressed syllable. /h(t)/ word-finally. /θ/ in the combination tk.
Ŧ ŧ	ŧe	/θ/	thick	
U u	u	/u/, /uː/	do	
V v	ve	/v/	vex	
Z z	ez	/t͡s/, /d͡z/	rods	/d͡z/ in the combination ⟨zz⟩.
Ž ž	ež	/t͡ʃ/, /d͡ʒ/	hedge	/d͡ʒ/ in the combination ⟨žž⟩.

When typing, if there is no way of entering the letters particular to Northern Sámi (⟨Čč Đđ Ŋŋ Šš Ŧŧ Žž⟩) correctly, an acute accent is sometimes placed over the corresponding Latin letter as a substitute. These substitutions are still found in books printed after the common orthography was adopted due to system limitations when typing.

=== Marks used in reference works ===
Some additional marks are used in dictionaries, grammars and other reference works, including in this article. They are not used in normal writing. The following are used in Pekka Sammallahti's Sámi-suoma sátnegirji:

- A vertical mark ˈ or apostrophe or other similar mark is placed between two identical consonants to indicate an overlong (quantity 3) consonant, e.g. golˈli "gold".
- The same mark may be used in the combination ⟨lˈj⟩ to indicate the Q3 consonant cluster /lːj/.
- A macron is placed above vowel letters to indicate a long vowel (⟨ē⟩, ⟨ī⟩, ⟨ō⟩, ⟨ū⟩).
- A dot is placed below vowel letters to indicate an unstressed vowel that has been shortened (⟨ạ⟩, ⟨ẹ⟩, ⟨ọ⟩), which in turn hints that preceding vowels are rising/half-long, and preceding Q3 consonants are shortened.

=== Multigraphs ===
Northern Sámi orthography includes many combinations of multiple letters. In most cases, a double consonant letter corresponds to a doubled consonant phoneme, e.g. mm stands for /mm/. Overlong (quantity 3) consonants are not distinguished from regular double consonants, but are commonly denoted with a vertical mark between the two consonant letters (⟨fˈf⟩, ⟨mˈm⟩, ⟨sˈs⟩ etc.) in reference works.

Combinations of different consonant letters stand for their equivalent individual phonemes, as described by the pronunciations of the individual letters, above. The last consonant in a sequence may be doubled. This indicates that the consonant cluster is quantity 2, while a cluster with an undoubled last consonant is generally quantity 3. It often also indicates a doubling of the corresponding consonant phoneme, but not if the preceding consonant is voiceless.

The following details combinations of multiple letters which are exceptions to the general pronunciation rules of each letter.

==== Diphthongs ====
The diphthongs, as may be expected, are written using a combination of two letters. Length is not indicated, nor is the distinction between normal and rising diphthongs. This distinction can be inferred by the presence of ⟨e⟩ and ⟨o⟩ in the next syllable (which must always be shortened vowels when following a diphthong), and in reference works by the presence of vowels with an underdot in the next syllable.

Letters	Phonemes
ea	/ea̯/, /e̯a/
ie	/ie̯/, /i̯e/
oa	/oɑ̯/, /o̯ɑ/
uo	/uo̯/, /u̯o/

==== Ending in ⟨j⟩ ====
The combinations ⟨dj⟩, ⟨lj⟩ and ⟨nj⟩ indicate /cc/, /ʎʎ/ and /ɲ/ respectively. The first letter is doubled to indicate longer versions, and a vertical line is then used for overlong /ɲːɲ/.

Letters	Phonemes	Letters	Phonemes	Letters	Phonemes
ddj	/ɟːɟ/	dj	/cc/	—	
llj	/ʎːʎ/	lj	/ʎʎ/	—	
nˈnj	/ɲːɲ/	nnj	/ɲɲ/	nj	/ɲ/

In the case of ⟨lj⟩, there are two possible interpretations: as a single quantity 2 consonant /ʎʎ/, or as a quantity 3 consonant cluster /lːj/ (e.g. olju), although the latter is rare. These two cases are distinguished by their behaviour in consonant gradation. In the first case, ⟨llj⟩ appears in the strong grade while ⟨lj⟩ appears in the weak grade, and these represent overlong /ʎːʎ/ and long /ʎʎ/ respectively. In the second case, ⟨lj⟩, alternatively written ⟨lˈj⟩, appears in the strong grade while ⟨ljj⟩ appears in the weak grade, representing the clusters /lːj/ and /ljj/ respectively.

==== Beginning with ⟨h⟩ ====
Preaspiration is indicated with a preceding ⟨h⟩. Long preaspiration is indicated by doubling the second letter. This is exactly the opposite of how normal clusters are written.

Letters	Phonemes	Letters	Phonemes
hcc	/hːt͡s/	hc	/ht͡s/
hčč	/hːt͡ʃ/	hč	/ht͡ʃ/
hkk	/hːk/	hk	/hk/
hpp	/hːp/	hp	/hp/
htt	/hːt/	ht	/ht/

Voiceless sonorants are also indicated by a preceding ⟨h⟩, but they have three lengths. Overlong length is indicated by a vertical line in reference works, as with other sonorants.

Letters	Phonemes	Letters	Phonemes	Letters	Phonemes
hjˈj	/j̥ːj̥/	hjj	/j̥j̥/	hj	/j̥/
hlˈl	/l̥ːl̥/	hll	/l̥l̥/	hl	/l̥/
hmˈm	/m̥ːm̥/	hmm	/m̥m̥/	hm	/m̥/
hnˈn	/n̥ːn̥/	hnn	/n̥n̥/	hn	/n̥/
hrˈr	/r̥ːr̥/	hrr	/r̥r̥/	hr	/r̥/

==== Stop-nasal combinations ====
Pre-stopped nasal consonants (Q2) are indicated by a preceding letter for a voiceless stop. Voiced pre-stopped nasals (Q3) are written with a voiced stop in place of the voiceless one.

Letters	Phoneme	Letters	Phoneme
bm	/bːm/	pm	/pm/
dn	/dːn/	tn	/tn/
dnj	/dːɲ/	tnj	/tɲ/
gŋ	/ɡːŋ/	kŋ	/kŋ/

=== Hyphenation ===
With just a single consonant between syllables, the hyphen goes before that consonant.

- i-ja
- de-há-laš

If a word contains a double consonant letter, the hyphen is always placed between those two letters. The combination ⟨ij⟩, when preceded by a vowel, counts as a double consonant and thus gets a hyphen in between.

- guol-li
- áhk-ká
- beaiv-váš
- krist-ta-laš
- bi-o-lo-gii-ja

With other combinations of two consonants, the hyphen goes between those. Again, if ⟨i⟩ counts as a consonant, it goes between that and the next one.

- Sáp-mi
- bái-di
- kon-sear-ta
- duos-tan

There are a few exceptions where the hyphen goes before all consonants.

- pro-gram-ma
- in-du-strii-ja

In compound words, a hyphen always goes between two parts of a compound.

- má-ilm-mi
- gas-ka-i-ja-beaiv-váš

== Grammar ==
Northern Sámi is a highly inflected language that shares many grammatical features with the other Uralic languages. Sámi has also developed considerably into the direction from originally an agglutinative morphology, to that of fusional and inflected one, much like Estonian to which it is distantly related. Therefore, morphemes are marked not only by suffixes but also by morphophonological modifications to the root. Of the various morphophonological alterations, the most important and complex is the system of consonant gradation.

=== Consonant gradation ===
Consonant gradation is a pattern of alternations between pairs of consonants that appears in the inflection of words. The system of consonant gradation in Northern Sámi is complex, especially compared to that found in the Finnic languages. A word stem can appear in two grades: the strong grade and the weak grade. A given word can alternate either between quantity 3 in the strong grade and quantity 2 in the weak grade, or between quantity 2 in the strong grade and quantity 1 in the weak grade. Historically, the weak grade appeared when the syllable following the consonant was closed (ended in a consonant), but the loss of certain vowels or consonants have obscured this in Northern Sámi and it is now a more-or-less opaque process.

In verbs, some nouns, and in some processes of word derivation, a Q2 strong grade can become "extra strong" Q3, alternating in all three quantities. This is caused by the historical loss of a consonant (often /j/ or /s/) between the second and third syllable, which triggered compensatory lengthening on the gradating consonant.

==== Quantity 3 ~ 2 alternations ====
Alternations between quantities 3 and 2 are either consonant clusters or sequences of two identical consonants. In the strong grade, the first consonant forms the coda of the preceding syllable, and the remaining consonants form the onset of the following syllable. In the weak grade, only the last consonant belongs to the onset of the next syllable, and the remaining consonants belong to the coda of the preceding syllable. Thus, when there are three or more consonants, the syllable division changes between the grades. In addition, the strong grade by default has a lengthened consonant in the coda, while this lengthening is generally absent in the weak grade. However, this lengthening is subject to the modifying effects of consonant lengthening and unstressed vowel shortening, which can in some occasions level the length distinctions, so that length not an absolute indicator of grade (though it is of quantity). In Eastern Finnmark, no lengthening is found at all, instead of length the preceding vowel is short, while the vowel becomes long when the length would be absent.

Doubling of the last consonant is another distinguishing feature of the weak grade, although it only occurs if the preceding consonant is voiced. The additional consonant is always assigned to the coda (the double consonant is split between syllables), so that it obligatorily shifts the syllable boundary relative to the strong grade:

- vl /vː.l/ ~ vll /vl.l/
- id /jː.t/ ~ idd /jt.t/

Consonant lengthening can then, in turn, lengthen the first of this pair again (the one in the coda). In writing, the last consonant is doubled in the weak grade, even if the preceding consonant is voiceless, simply to distinguish the two grades visually:

- st /sː.t/ ~ stt /s.t/
- vst /vː.st/ ~ vstt /vs.t/

Sequences of two identical consonants gradate in the same way, with lengthening of the first consonant in the strong grade (again, subject to modification, and not in Eastern Finnmark), but without any doubling of the last consonant in the weak grade. For most pairs of consonants, no difference is made between the grades orthographically, both are written with a double consonant. In reference works, the special mark ˈ is placed between the consonants to indicate the strong grade.

Some cases are indicated specially in the orthography, but behave as expected from a phonological point of view:

- Clusters beginning with /h/ (preaspirated stops): the second consonant is written doubled in the strong grade instead of the weak grade. In Eastern Finnmark the length is lost, making both grades identical (but still with different preceding vowel lengths).
  - hpp /hː.p/ (EF /h.p/) ~ hp /h.p/
  - htt /hː.t/ (EF /h.t/) ~ ht /h.t/
  - hcc /hː.t͡s/ (EF /h.t͡s/) ~ hc /h.t͡s/
  - hčč /hː.t͡ʃ/ (EF /h.t͡ʃ/) ~ hč /h.t͡ʃ/
  - hkk /hː.k/ (EF /h.k/) ~ hk /h.k/
- Clusters of /r/ plus pre-stopped nasal: orthographically indicated the same as lone pre-stopped nasals (below), but both grades have a voiceless stop, and differ only in the length of the first consonant and syllabification. In Eastern Finnmark, the stop is missing from the strong grade.
  - rbm /rː.pm/ (EF /r.m/) ~ rpm /rp.m/
  - rdn /rː.tn/ (EF /r.n/) ~ rtn /rt.n/
  - rdnj /rː.tɲ/ (EF /r.ɲ/) ~ rtnj /rt.ɲ/
  - rgŋ /rː.kŋ/ (EF /r.ŋ/) ~ rkŋ /rk.ŋ/
- Sequences of two /ʎ/: the strong grade is indicated by a doubled first consonant, the weak grade by only a single one. This is possible because this consonant cannot occur singly (as quantity 1).
  - llj /ʎː.ʎ/ ~ lj /ʎ.ʎ/
- Sequences of two /ɲ/: both grades are indicated identically. The strong grade can be distinguished with an overlength mark in reference works.
  - nˈnj /ɲː.ɲ/ ~ nnj /ɲ.ɲ/
- Sequences of two voiceless sonorants: both grades are indicated identically. The strong grade can be distinguished with an overlength mark in reference works.
  - hjˈj /j̥ː.j̥/ ~ hjj /j̥.j̥/
  - hlˈl /l̥ː.l̥/ ~ hll /l̥.l̥/
  - hmˈm /m̥ː.m̥/ ~ hmm /m̥.m̥/
  - hnˈn /n̥ː.n̥/ ~ hnn /n̥.n̥/
  - hrˈr /r̥ː.r̥/ ~ hrr /r̥.r̥/

In some clusters, there is an alternation in the quality of the first consonant between the two grades.

- Clusters beginning with /k/ in the strong grade: /k/ becomes /v/ in the weak grade. /h/ is inserted before a stop or affricate, and in other cases the last consonant phoneme can be doubled in the weak grade.
  - kc /kː.t͡s/ ~ vcc /vh.t͡s/ ([f.t͡s])
  - ks /kː.s/ ~ vss /vs.s/
  - kst /kː.st/ ~ vstt /vs.t/
  - kt /kː.t/ ~ vtt /vh.t/ ([f.t])
- Clusters of pre-stopped nasals: a voiced stop occurs in the strong grade, and a voiceless stop in the weak grade. The voiceless stop, in turn, blocks doubling of the last consonant. In this case, however, there is no doubling in the orthography. In Eastern Finnmark, the stop is devoiced in the strong grade, making the two grades identical (but still with different preceding vowel lengths). In Sea Sámi, this alternation is replaced by geminate nasals.
  - bm /bː.m/ (EF /p.m/) ~ pm /p.m/
  - dn /dː.n/ (EF /d.n/) ~ tn /t.n/
  - dnj /dː.ɲ/ (EF /d.ɲ/) ~ tnj /t.ɲ/
  - gŋ /ɡː.ŋ/ (EF /ɡ.ŋ/) ~ kŋ /k.ŋ/
- Clusters of a voiced consonant (except /r/) plus pre-stopped nasal: the stop is voiceless and occurs only in the strong grade, the weak grade has doubling of the nasal. In Eastern Finnmark, the stop is missing from the strong grade.
  - lbm /lː.pm/ (EF /l.m/) ~ lmm /lm.m/
  - idn /jː.tn/ (EF /j.n/) ~ inn /jn.n/
  - vdnj /vː.tɲ/ (EF /v.ɲ/) ~ vnnj /vɲ.ɲ/
  - lgŋ /lː.kŋ/ (EF /l.ŋ/) ~ lŋŋ /lŋ.ŋ/
- Sequences of two homorganic plain stops: the first stop is voiced in the strong grade, voiceless in the weak grade. The strong grade is represented orthographically by a pair of voiced consonants.
  - bb /bː.b/ ~ pp /p.p/
  - dd /dː.d/ ~ tt /t.t/
  - gg /ɡː.ɡ/ ~ kk /k.k/
  - zz /dː.d͡z/ ~ cc /t.t͡s/
  - žž /dː.d͡ʒ/ ~ čč /t.t͡ʃ/
- Sequences of two palatal stops: these are phonetically the same as the previous, but different orthographically.
  - ddj /ɟː.ɟ/ ~ dj /c.c/

==== Quantity 2 ~ 1 alternations ====
Alternations between 2 and 1 are less predictable than alternations between quantities 3 and 2. The weak grade is always represented by a single consonant, which forms the onset of the next syllable, and the preceding syllable has no coda. The corresponding strong grade additionally has a single consonant in the coda, which may the same as the following onset consonant or different. The coda consonant in the strong grade may undergo consonant lengthening to receive additional length.

A double consonant in the strong grade always alternates with a single consonant in the weak grade. This occurs with all nasals, sonorants and fricatives (except /ʎ/ and /j/). Orthographically, this is represented as a double versus a single consonant letter.

- hrr /r̥.r̥/ ~ hr /r̥/
- mm /m.m/ ~ m /m/
- nnj /ɲ.ɲ/ ~ nj /ɲ/
- ss /s.s/ ~ s /s/
- đđ /ð.ð/ ~ đ /ð/

A cluster of short /h/ and a voiceless consonant (preaspirated) in the strong grade alternates with a single voiced consonant in the weak grade.

- hp /h.p/ ~ b /p/ (/v/ in Eastern Finnmark)
- ht /h.t/ ~ đ /ð/
- hc /h.t͡s/ ~ z /d͡z/
- hč /h.t͡ʃ/ ~ ž /d͡ʒ/
- hk /h.k/ ~ g /k/ (/j/ or zero in Eastern Finnmark)

A cluster of a voiceless pre-stopped nasal in the strong grade drops the stop in the weak grade. In Sea Sámi, the strong grade has a double nasal, without the stop.

- pm /p.m/ ~ m /m/
- tn /t.n/ ~ n /n/
- tnj /t.ɲ/ ~ nj /ɲ/
- kŋ /k.ŋ/ ~ ŋ /ŋ/

Double /cc/ alternates with /j/.

- dj /c.c/ ~ j /j/

=== Changes to word-final consonants ===
Only a limited number of consonants are allowed at the end of a word, those being l, n, r, s, š, t, and i (pronounced /j/). The consonant clusters id /jt/ and in /jn/ are also allowed. Therefore, consonants will be modified or deleted when they come to stand word-finally:

- Consonant clusters are simplified to the first consonant, e.g. ld and rd become l and r, respectively.
- The consonants b, d (pronounced /ð/), g, h, and hk all become t.
- The affricates z, ž and žž become fricative s and š.
- m becomes n. Some recent loanwords such as serum retain /m/.
- The consonants g, m, and n can also disappear entirely in certain words.

=== Post-stressed vowel alternations ===
Certain inflectional endings and derivational suffixes trigger changes in the first unstressed (post-stressed) vowel of the stem. These changes are generally the result of umlaut effects in Proto-Samic. The following changes may be noted. An empty table cell means there is no change, S indicates diphthong simplification.

a /a/	i /iː/	u /uː/	Cause/trigger	Occurrences
	ẹ /e/	ọ /o/	Unstressed vowel shortening.	Nominal "allegro" forms, verb present connegative, imperative.
	á /aː/	o /o/ S	Proto-Samic *ë in the next syllable.	Odd nominals with gradation, verb past participle, conditional.
	i /i/ S		Following /j/.	Nominal plural, verb past tense.
i /i/ S	á /aː/	u /u/ S	Contraction of /s/ plus Proto-Samic *ë in the next syllable.	Nominal illative singular.
e /e/ S	e /e/ S	o /o/ S	Contraction of /j/ plus Proto-Samic *ë in the next syllable.	Some verb present and past forms.
	e /e/ S	o /o/ S	Contraction, exact mechanism unclear.	Verb potential mood.

There are some vowel alternations that do not have a clear rule or cause. For example, the change of a to á in the present tense third-person singular of verbs is unexpected and must simply be taken as-is. Likewise, the appearance of u or o in some verb imperative forms is not based on any rule, but is an inherent part of the ending.

=== Inflection types ===
All inflected words, whether nouns, adjectives or verbs, can be divided into three main inflectional classes. The division is based on whether there is an even or odd number of syllables from the last stressed syllable to the end of the word.

- Words with even inflection (bárrastávvalsánit, also called "vowel stems") have an even number of syllables from the last stressed syllable of the stem; usually two, but sometimes also four.
- Words with odd inflection (bárahisstávvalsánit, also called "consonant stems") have an odd number of syllables from the last stressed syllable of the stem; usually three, but very rarely one or five.
- Words with contracted inflection (kontráktasánit) have an even number of syllables from the last stressed syllable of the stem, but have the consonant gradation pattern of odd-inflection words. If the gradation has three levels, the strong grade is always level 3.

For nouns and adjectives, the stem is taken from the accusative/genitive singular rather than the nominative, as the latter often drops the final vowel and sometimes also the preceding consonant. For verbs, the infinitive is used to determine the stem, by removing the infinitive ending -t.

Words with even and contracted inflection can be divided further, based on the final vowel of the stem. For even-inflected words, this vowel is most commonly a, i or u, while for contracted words it is mostly á, e or o. Words with odd inflection are not differentiated by stem-final vowel.

=== Nouns ===
Nouns inflect in singular (ovttaidlohku) and plural (máŋggaidlohku), and also in 7 cases. The following table shows the general endings; the actual forms can differ based on consonant gradation and the inflection type of the word.

Case	Singular ending	Plural ending	Meaning/use
Nominative (nominatiiva)	‑∅	‑t	Subject
Accusative (akkusatiiva)	‑∅	‑id	Object
Genitive (genitiiva)	‑∅	‑id	Possession, relation
Illative (illatiiva)	‑i	‑ide, ‑idda	Motion towards/onto/into
Locative (lokatiiva)	‑s	‑in	Being at/on/in, motion from/off/out of
Comitative (komitatiiva)	‑in	‑iguin	With, in company of, by means of
Essive (essiiva)	‑n, ‑in		As, in the role of, under condition of (when)

The accusative and genitive are usually identical. There is no singular-plural distinction in the essive, so for example mánnán is interpreted as either "as a child" or "as children".

==== Even nouns ====
Nouns with even inflection have an inherent stem-final vowel. They also usually have consonant gradation of the last consonant in the stem, where the strong grade appears in the nominative singular, illative singular and essive, while the weak grade appears in the remaining forms.

Some even nouns do not gradate. These can generally be divided into two groups:

- Originally non-gradating odd nouns that have undergone contraction. These appear with quantity 3 in all forms. The most notable of these are the agent nouns, which were formed in Proto-Samic with the suffix *-jē, but do not have any visible suffix in Northern Sámi anymore.
- Recent loanwords. These may appear with any consonant or cluster permissible in Northern Sámi.

The most common even nouns are the nouns with a stem ending in -a, -i or slightly rarer -u.

	giehta "hand" Stem in -a		oaivi "head" Stem in -i		ruoktu "home" Stem in -u	
Case	Singular	Plural	Singular	Plural	Singular	Plural
Nominative	giehta	gieđat	oaivi	oaivvit	ruoktu	ruovttut
Accusative	gieđa	gieđaid	oaivvi	ōivviid	ruovttu	ruovttūid
Genitive	gieđa	gieđaid	oaivvi, oaivvẹ	ōivviid	ruovttu, ruovttọ	ruovttūid
Illative	gīhtii	gieđaide	oaivái	ōivviide	rūktui	ruovttūide
Locative	gieđas	gieđain	oaivvis	ōivviin	ruovttus	ruovttūin
Comitative	gieđain	gieđaiguin	ōivviin	ōivviiguin	ruovttūin	ruovttūiguin
Essive	giehtan		oaivin		ruoktun	

Even-syllable nouns with a stem ending in -á, -e or -o also exist, but are much rarer.

	guoddá "pillow" Stem in -á		baste "spoon" Stem in -e		gáivo "well" Stem in -o	
Case	Singular	Plural	Singular	Plural	Singular	Plural
Nominative	guoddá	guottát	baste	basttet	gáivo	gáivvot
Accusative	guottá	guottáid	bastte	basttiid	gáivvo	gáivvuid
Genitive	guottá	guottáid	bastte	basttiid	gáivvo	gáivvuid
Illative	guoddái	guottáide	bastii	basttiide	gáivui	gáivvuide
Locative	guottás	guottáin	basttes	basttiin	gáivvos	gáivvuin
Comitative	guottáin	guottáiguin	basttiin	basttiiguin	gáivvuin	gáivvuiguin
Essive	guoddán		basten		gaivon	

Even nouns with four or more syllables sometimes drop the final vowel in the nominative singular. Consequently, simplification of the final consonant occurs. The stem of these nouns always ends in -a.

	sápmẹlaš "Sámi person"	
Case	Singular	Plural
Nominative	sápmẹlaš	sápmẹlaččat
Accusative	sápmẹlačča	sápmẹlaččaid
Genitive	sápmẹlačča	sápmẹlaččaid
Illative	sápmẹlažžii	sápmẹlaččaide
Locative	sápmẹlaččas	sápmẹlaččain
Comitative	sápmẹlaččain	sápmẹlaččaiguin
Essive	sápmẹlažžan	

==== Odd nouns ====
Nouns with odd inflection are not distinguished by the stem-final vowel, all use the same set of endings. They can be divided into two types, gradating and non-gradating nouns:

- Non-gradating odd nouns originate from Proto-Samic nouns ending in a vowel. They have the same stem in all forms, with no gradation, although the last consonant(s) may be modified word-finally in the nominative singular.
- Gradating odd nouns originate from Proto-Samic nouns ending in a consonant. They have consonant gradation, where the weak grade appears in the nominative and essive singular, and the strong grade appears in the remaining forms. The vowels i and u change to á and o respectively in the last syllable of the strong-grade stem, caused by a former Proto-Samic *ë in the endings. The stem-final consonants -g, -m and -n disappear in the weak-grade forms, so that the essive ending is attached directly to the preceding vowel.

The following table shows three gradating odd nouns.

	ganjal "tear (eye)"		lávlla "song"		mielddus "copy"	
Case	Singular	Plural	Singular	Plural	Singular	Plural
Nominative	ganjal	gatnjalat	lávlla	lávlagat	mielddus	mīldosat
Accusative	gatnjala	gatnjaliid	lávlaga	lávlagiid	mīldosa	mīldosiid
Genitive	gatnjala	gatnjaliid	lávlaga	lávlagiid	mīldosa	mīldosiid
Illative	gatnjalii	gatnjaliidda	lávlagii	lávlagiidda	mīldosii	mīldosiidda
Locative	gatnjalis	gatnjaliin	lávlagis	lávlagiin	mīldosis	mīldosiin
Comitative	gatnjaliin	gatnjaliiguin	lávlagiin	lávlagiiguin	mīldosiin	mīldosiiguin
Essive	ganjalin		lávllan		mielddusin	

==== Contracted nouns ====
Nouns with contracted inflection are in origin gradating odd nouns, mostly with a stem ending in -j or -s, sometimes also -ž (in olmmoš).

In the strong-grade forms, the last-syllable vowel is modified as in gradating odd nouns. However, the stem-final consonant has been lost, causing contraction of the two neighbouring syllables. The preceding consonant cluster receives compensatory lengthening, making them quantity 3 regardless of original length. Consequently, the strong grade forms of such nouns have an even number of syllables and receive the same endings as even nouns, but do not gradate.

In the weak-grade forms, the original uncontracted form is usually preserved. The original final consonant -j has been lost after the vowels u and i, so that it does not appear in any of the forms anymore.

	čeavrris "otter" Stem in -is-		boazu "reindeer" Stem in -u- (originally -uj-)		olmmái "man" Stem in -áj-	
Case	Singular	Plural	Singular	Plural	Singular	Plural
Nominative	čeavrris	čeavrát	boazu	bōhccot	olmmái	olbmát
Accusative	čeavrá	čeavráid	bōhcco	bōhccuid	olbmá	olbmáid
Genitive	čeavrá	čeavráid	bōhcco	bōhccuid	olbmá	olbmáid
Illative	čeavrái	čeavráide	bōhccui	bōhccuide	olbmái	olbmáide
Locative	čeavrás	čeavráin	bōhccos	bōhccuin	olbmás	olbmáin
Comitative	čeavráin	čeavráiguin	bōhccuin	bōhccuiguin	olbmáin	olbmáiguin
Essive	čeavrrisin		boazun		olmmájin	

==== Possessive suffixes ====
The possessive suffixes are similar in meaning to the English personal possessive determiners my, your, their and so on. There are 9 possessive suffixes: one for each person in singular, dual and plural. Possessive suffixes attach to the end of a noun, after the case ending. Thus, for example, ruovttus "in a house" may become ruovttustan "in my house".

Like noun case endings, the suffixes have different forms depending on whether they are attached to a stem with an even or odd number of syllables, and (in the case of even-syllable stems) depending on the last vowel of the stem. The following table shows the suffixes:

	1st sg.	2nd sg.	3rd sg.	1st du.	2nd du.	3rd du.	1st pl.	2nd pl.	3rd pl.
Even in -a	-an	-at	-as	-ame	-ade	-aska	-amet	-adet	-aset
Even in -á	-án	-át	-ás	-áme	-áde	-áska	-ámet	-ádet	-áset
Even in -e	-en	-et	-es	-eme	-ede	-eska	-emet	-edet	-eset
Even in -i	-án	-át	-is	-áme	-áde	-iska	-ámet	-ádet	-iset
Even in -o	-on	-ot	-os	-ome	-ode	-oska	-omet	-odet	-oset
Even in -u	-on	-ot	-us	-ome	-ode	-uska	-omet	-odet	-uset
Odd	-an	-at	-is	-eame	-eatte	-easkka	-eamet	-eattet	-easet

The suffixes attach to a combination of noun plus case ending, so the stem that the suffix is attached to may not be the stem of the noun. Rather, a new "possessive stem" is formed from the noun with its case ending included. This stem is not always identical to the ending of the noun on its own; some case endings undergo modifications or the addition of a final vowel. Thus, certain cases may have possessive stems that inherently end in -a, other cases may have -i, but this is only significant if the combination has an even number of syllables.

The following table shows the possessive stems for each case, for four of the nouns whose inflection was given above. If the stem ends in a vowel, it is even and the suffixes with the matching vowel are used. If the stem ends in a consonant, it is odd and the odd endings are used.

	giehta "hand" Even in -a		oaivi "head" Even in -i		ruoktu "home" Even in -u		lávlla "song" Odd	
Case	Singular	Plural	Singular	Plural	Singular	Plural	Singular	Plural
Nominative	giehta-	?	oaivi-	?	ruoktu-	?	lávlag-	?
Accusative	giehta-, gieđa-	gieđaid-	oaivi-	ōivviid-	ruoktu-	ruovttūid-	lávlag-	lávlagiiddi-
Genitive	giehta-, gieđa-	gieđaid-	oaivi-	ōivviid-	ruoktu-	ruovttūid-	lávlag-	lávlagiiddi-
Illative	giehtas-	gieđaidasa-	oaivás-	ōivviidasa-	ruktos-	ruovttūidasa-	lávlagasa-	lávlagiiddás-
Locative	gieđast-	gieđain-	oaivvist-	ōivviin-	ruovttust-	ruovttūin-	lávlagistti-	lávlagiinni-
Comitative	gieđain-	gieđaid- -guin	ōivviin-	ōivviid- -guin	ruovttūin-	ruovttuid- -guin	lávlagiinni-	lávlagiiddi- -guin
Essive	giehtan-		oaivin-		ruoktun-		lávllan-	

In the comitative plural, the possessive suffix attaches between the possessive stem and the final -guin.

As can be seen in the table, for the nominative, accusative and genitive singular cases, the possessive stem is identical to the noun stem. The stem also undergoes consonant gradation in the accusative and genitive singular forms, and endings beginning with e or o also trigger diphthong simplification. The noun is in the strong grade with the first-person possessive suffixes, and in the weak grade with the second- and third-person possessives.

The possessive forms of ruoktu are:

Case/number	1st sg.	2nd sg.	3rd sg.	1st du.	2nd du.	3rd du.	1st pl.	2nd pl.	3rd pl.
Nominative singular	rūkton	rūktot	ruoktus	rūktome	rūktode	ruoktuska	rūktomet	rūktodet	ruoktuset
Accusative/genitive singular	rūkton	rūvttot	ruovttus	rūktome	rūvttode	ruovttuska	rūktomet	rūvttodet	ruovttuset
Illative singular	rūktosan	rūktosat	rūktosis	rūktoseame	rūktoseatte	rūktoseaskka	rūktoseamet	rūktoseattet	rūktoseaset
Locative singular	ruovttustan	ruovttustat	ruovttustis	ruovttusteame	ruovttusteatte	ruovttusteaskka	ruovttusteamet	ruovttusteattet	ruovttusteaset
Comitative singular	ruovttūinan	ruovttūinat	ruovttūinis	ruovttūineame	ruovttūineatte	ruovttūineaskka	ruovttūineamet	ruovttūineattet	ruovttūineaset
Accusative/genitive plural	ruovttūidan	ruovttūidat	ruovttūidis	ruovttūideame	ruovttūideatte	ruovttūideaskka	ruovttūideamet	ruovttūideattet	ruovttūideaset
Illative plural	ruovttūidasan	ruovttūidasat	ruovttūidasas	ruovttūidasame	ruovttūidasade	ruovttūidasaska	ruovttūidasamet	ruovttūidasadet	ruovttūidasaset
Locative plural	ruovttūinan	ruovttūinat	ruovttūinis	ruovttūineame	ruovttūineatte	ruovttūineaskka	ruovttūineamet	ruovttūineattet	ruovttūineaset
Comitative plural	ruovttūidanguin	ruovttūidatguin	ruovttūidisguin	ruovttūideameguin	ruovttūideatteguin	ruovttūideaskkaguin	ruovttūideametguin	ruovttūideattetguin	ruovttūideasetguin
Essive	ruoktunan	ruoktunat	ruoktunis	ruoktuneame	ruoktuneatte	ruoktuneaskka	ruoktuneamet	ruoktuneattet	ruoktuneaset

=== Adjectives ===
Adjectives inflect the same as nouns do, and have the same cases and inflection types.

==== Attributive form ====
Adjectives also have an additional form, the attributive form (attribuhttahápmi). This form is used when the adjective is used attributively, where it precedes the noun. The attributive does not receive any endings, so it does not have cases or number. Its formation is also unpredictable: for some adjectives, it is formed from the nominative singular by adding an extra ending of some kind to the stem, while for others the attributive is formed by removing part of the stem. It may also be identical to the nominative singular. Some examples:

Nom. singular	Stem	Attributive	Meaning
boaris	boarás- (odd)	boares	old
čáppat	čábbá- (contracted)	čáppa	beautiful
čielggas	čielggas- (odd)	čielga	clear, transparent
čieŋal	čieŋal- (odd)	čiekŋalis	deep
duohta	duohta- (even)	duohta	true
duolvvas	duolvas- (odd)	duolva	dirty
gievra	gievra- (even)	gievrras	strong
guhkki	guhkki- (even)	guhkes	long
mohkkái	mohkká- (contracted)	mohkkás	complicated
ruoksat	ruoksad- (odd)	rūkses	red
šealgat	šealgad- (odd)	šealges	shiny
uhcci	uhcci- (even)	uhca	small

A couple of adjectives do not have an attributive form. These are the frequently-used adjective buorre "good", and for some speakers also bahá "angry, evil". When these adjectives are used attributively, the case and number of the adjective matches that of the noun it is an attribute of (as in for example Finnish). As an example, take the sentence "Son lea dahkan munnje buori dagu." (English: "She has done me a good deed."). Here, buorre is inflected in the accusative as buori to match dagu.

==== Comparison ====
	buoret "better" Odd inflection in -u		buoremus "best" Even inflection in -a	
Case	Singular	Plural	Singular	Plural
Nominative	buorẹt	buorẹbut	buorẹmus	buorẹmusat
Accusative	buorẹbu	buorẹbuid	buorẹmusa	buorẹmusaid
Genitive	buorẹbu	buorẹbuid	buorẹmusa	buorẹmusaid
Illative	buorẹbui	buorẹbuidda	buorẹmussii	buorẹmusaide
Locative	buorẹbus	buorẹbuin	buorẹmusas	buorẹmusain
Comitative	buorẹbuin	buorẹbuiguin	buorẹmusain	buorẹmusaiguin
Essive	buorẹbun		buorẹmussan	

	boaráset "older" Even inflection in -o		boaráseamos "oldest" Odd inflection	
Case	Singular	Plural	Singular	Plural
Nominative	boaráset	boaráseappot	boaráseamos	boarásēpmosat
Accusative	boaráseappo	boaráseappūid	boarásēpmosa	boarásēpmosiid
Genitive	boaráseappo	boaráseappūid	boarásēpmosa	boarásēpmosiid
Illative	boarásēbbui	boaráseappūide	boarásēpmosii	boarásēpmosiidda
Locative	boaráseappos	boaráseappūin	boarásēpmosis	boarásēpmosiin
Comitative	boaráseappūin	boaráseappūiguin	boarásēpmosiin	boarásēpmosiiguin
Essive	boaráseabbon		boaráseamosin	

=== Pronouns and determiners ===
==== Personal pronouns ====
The personal pronouns inflect irregularly, and also have a third number, the dual (guvttiidlohku). The dual is used to refer to exactly two people. The following table shows the forms.

Case	mun, mon "I"	don "you (sg.)"	son "he, she"
Nominative	mun, mon	don	son
Accusative	mu	du	su
Genitive	mu	du	su
Illative	munnje	dutnje	sutnje
Locative	mus	dus	sus
Comitative	muinna	duinna	suinna
Essive	munin	dunin	sunin
Case	moai "we two"	doai "you two"	soai "they two"
Nominative	moai	doai	soai
Accusative	mun'no	dudno	sudno
Genitive	mun'no	dudno	sudno
Illative	mun'nuide	dudnuide	sudnuide
Locative	mun'nos	dudnos	sudnos
Comitative	mun'nuin	dudnuin	sudnuin
Essive	mun'non	dudnon	sudnon
Case	mii "we (all)"	dii "you (all)"	sii "they (all)"
Nominative	mii	dii	sii
Accusative	min	din	sin
Genitive	min	din	sin
Illative	midjiide	didjiide	sidjiide
Locative	mis	dis	sis
Comitative	minguin	dinguin	singuin
Essive	minin	dinin	sinin

==== Demonstratives ====
The five demonstrative determiners/pronouns inflect somewhat irregularly as well. The nominative singular and nominative plural are identical, and some other cases have endings not found in nouns.

	dat "it, the (aforementioned)"		dát "this (near speaker)"		diet "that (near listener)"		duot "that (not near either)"		dot "that, yonder (very far)"	
Case	Singular	Plural	Singular	Plural	Singular	Plural	Singular	Plural	Singular	Plural
Nominative	dat	dat	dát	dát	diet	diet	duot	duot	dot	dot
Accusative	dan	daid	dán	dáid	dien	dieid	duon	duoid	don	doid
Genitive	dan	daid	dán	dáid	dien	dieid	duon	duoid	don	doid
Illative	dasa	daidda	dása	dáidda	diesa	dieidda	duosa	duoidda	dosa	doidda
Locative	das	dain	dás	dáin	dies	diein	duos	duoin	dos	doin
Comitative	dainna	daiguin	dáinna	dáiguin	dieinna	dieiguin	duoinna	duoiguin	doinna	doiguin
Essive	danin		dánin		dienin		duonin		donin	

When these words modify a noun rather than standing alone, the demonstrative is in the same case as the noun, with the following exceptions:

- A noun in the illative or locative singular is preceded by a demonstrative in the accusative/genitive singular form.
- A noun in the comitative plural is preceded by a demonstrative in either the comitative or the accusative/genitive plural form.

==== Interrogatives ====
The interrogative/relative pronouns/determiners gii "who" and mii "what" are likewise irregular.

	gii "who"		mii "what, which"	
Case	Singular	Plural	Singular	Plural
Nominative	gii	geat	mii	mat
Accusative	gean	geaid	man, máid	maid
Genitive	gean	geaid	man	maid
Illative	geasa	geaidda	masa	maidda
Locative	geas	geain	mas	main
Comitative	geainna	geaiguin	mainna	maiguin
Essive	geanin		manin	

In the accusative singular of mii, there are two possible forms. The "regular" form man is used when there is an implication of a choice from a limited number of options. The form máid has no such implication.

These two pronouns, as well as other interrogatives (which inflect regularly) can act as determiners and modify nouns. The rules for which case to use are the same as for the demonstrative. The form máid is followed by a noun in the accusative plural form.

==== Reflexive pronoun ====
The reflexive pronoun is ieš (dual and plural ieža), meaning myself, yourself, himself, herself and so on. In its base form, the pronoun occurs only in the nominative case and is never used on its own; it always occurs next to the subject of the sentence, where it acts as an adverb to strengthen it. Compare for example sentences such as I myself have never seen it..

The other cases can occur by themselves, but only in the singular, and are always used in combination with a possessive suffix that matches the subject of the sentence (i.e. always I see myself, never I see himself). These forms are irregular as well as suppletive: the illative and locative forms derive from completely different roots. There are also several alternative stems.

Case	Possessive stem	Notes
Accusative	ieža- (iehča-)	The stem iehča- is only used with first-person possessives.
Genitive	ieža- (iehča-)	The stem iehča- is only used with first-person possessives.
Illative	alcces-, alcce-, allas- (alcca-)	The stem alcca- is only used with first- and second-person possessives.
Locative	alddi-, alddest- (alddiin-, alddán-)	The stems alddiin- and alddán- are only used with dual and plural possessives.
Comitative	iežain-	
Essive	iehčan-	

=== Verbs ===
==== Finite verbal categories ====
The conjugation of Northern Sámi verbs resembles that of Finnish. There are three grammatical persons (persovnnat), and three grammatical numbers (logut), singular, dual and plural. There are four or five grammatical moods (vuogit):

- indicative (indikatiiva or duohtavuohki), indicating real events or statements of fact.
- imperative (imperatiiva or gohččunvuohki), indicating commands.
- optative (optatiiva or ávžžuhusvuohki), indicating wishes, things that the speaker would like to see done or realised. The optative is not usually considered a distinct mood, but is generally combined with the imperative.
- conditional (konditionála or eaktovuohki), indicating conditional or hypothetical statements, like the English subjunctive and the verb "would".
- potential (potientiála or veadjinvuohki), indicating ability or possibility.

Tense is also distinguished, but only in the indicative. There are two tenses (tempusat):

- present (preseansa or dálá áigi), which is also used for future events (nonpast tense).
- past (preterihtta or vássán áigi).

In addition, each mood and tense has a so-called connegative form. This form is used in negative sentences, when combined with the negative verb.

==== Non-finite verbal categories ====
Finally, there are several non-finite forms.

===== Infinitive =====
The infinitive is the dictionary form of the verb.

===== Present participle =====
The present participle is an adjective indicating a current or ongoing action. It is identical in form to the agent noun, and has the same origin. However, the participle has only an attributive form, no case forms.

- oađˈđi mánná – a sleeping child
- áhpásmeaddji buohcci – a recovering patient

===== Past participle =====
The past participle is an adjective indicating a past or completed action. Like the present participle, it has only an attributive form. It is also used in forming the periphrastic perfect tense, and as the connegative form of the past indicative.

- oađđán mánná – child who slept
- áhpásman buohcci – patient who recovered

===== Agent participle =====
The agent participle is an adjective indicating a past or completed action that has been completed by a particular agent. It only exists for transitive verbs. The agent precedes the participle and is in the genitive case, much like its Finnish counterpart:

- áhči čállin reive – the letter written by the father

===== Negative participle =====
The negative participle is an adjective indicating an action that has not been done by or to something. It can be either active or passive in meaning.

- logakeahtẹs reive – unread letter
- jugakeahtẹs vuola – undrunk beer
- muitalkeahtẹs muitalus – untold story

===== Action noun =====
The action noun is a noun which indicates the action itself. It is not a verb form as such, but is often used in verbal constructions.

===== Action inessive =====
The action inessive (also called the "action essive") indicates "in (the process of)" or "while". It is used together with the copula leat to express a current, ongoing action, much like the English continuous.

- mánná lea oađđimin – the child is sleeping
- mun lean juhkamin vuola – I am drinking beer

The action inessive originates in the inessive case of the action noun, a case which no longer exists for nouns in Northern Sámi.

===== Action elative =====
The action elative (also called the "action locative") indicates "from (the action of)". It is used to indicate the cessation of an action, but is also required idiomatically by certain verbs.

- mun vajálduhtin oađđimis – I forgot to sleep

The action elative originates in the elative case of the action noun, a case which became the locative in regular nouns.

===== Action comitative =====
The action comitative indicates "through" or "by". It originates in the comitative case of the action noun.

===== Purposive converb =====
The purposive converb expresses "in order to".

===== Simultaneous converb =====
The simultaneous converb expresses that an action took place "during" or "while (doing)" another one. It is always accompanied by a possessive suffix.

===== Negative converb =====
The negative converb (also called the "verb abessive") expresses "without".

===== Verb genitive =====
The verb genitive is an adverbial form often used to indicate the way/method, accompanied by a verb of motion. It only exists for some verbs and is not very productive, so it is better considered a derivational form rather than an inflectional form.

===== Supine =====
The supine expresses "in order to". It is only used in western Northern Sámi dialects.

==== Verbs with even inflection ====
infinitive	viehkat "to run"	action noun	viehkan "(act of) running"	purposive converb	viehkandihte "in order to run"
present participle	viehkki "running"	action inessive	viehkamin, viehkame "(in the act of) running"	simultaneous converb	viegadettiinis "while (he/she/it) runs"
past participle	viehkan "which ran"	action elative	viehkamis "from (the act of) running"		
agent participle	(viehkan)	action comitative	viehkamiin "by running"		
negative participle	viegakeahtẹs "which didn't run"	negative converb	viegakeahttá "without running"		
	Present indicative	Past indicative	Imperative/ optative	Conditional	Potential
1st singular	viegan	vīhken	vīhkon	viegašin, viegašedjen	viegažan
2nd singular	viegat	vīhket	viega	viegašit, viegašedjet	viegažat
3rd singular	viehká	viegai	vīhkos	viegašii	viegaža, viegaš
1st dual	vīhke	viegaime	viehkku	viegašeimme	viegažetne
2nd dual	viehkabeahtti	viegaide	viehkki	viegašeidde	viegažeahppi
3rd dual	viehkaba	viegaiga	vīhkoska	viegašeigga	viegažeaba
1st plural	viehkat	viegaimet	vīhkot, viehkkut	viegašeimmet	viegažit, viegažat
2nd plural	viehkabēhtet	viegaidet	vīhket, viehkkit	viegašeiddet	viegažehpet
3rd plural	vīhket	vīhke	vīhkoset	viegaše, viegašedje	viegažit
Connegative	viega	viehkan	viega	viegaše	viegaš

eallit - to live	Present indicative	Past indicative	Imperative/ optative	Conditional	Potential
1st singular	ealán	ēllen	ēllon	ealášin, ealášedjen	ēležan
2nd singular	ealát	ēllet	eale	ealášit, ealášedjet	ēležat
3rd singular	eallá	ēlii	ēllos	ealášii	ēleža, ēleš
1st dual	ēlle	ēliime	eal'lu	ealášeimme	ēležetne
2nd dual	eallibeahtti	ēliide	eal'li	ealášeidde	ēležeahppi
3rd dual	ealliba	ēliiga	ēlloska	ealášeigga	ēležeaba
1st plural	eallit	ēliimet	ēllot, eal'lut	ealášeimmet	ēležit, ēležat
2nd plural	eallibēhtet	ēliidet	ēllet, eal'lit	ealášeiddet	ēležehpet
3rd plural	ēllet	ēlle	ēlloset	ealáše, ealášedje	ēležit
Connegative	eale	eallán	eale	ealáše	ēleš

goarrut - to sew	Present indicative	Past indicative	Imperative/ optative	Conditional	Potential
1st singular	goarun	gōrron	gōrron	gōrošin, gōrošedjen	gōrožan
2nd singular	goarut	gōrrot	goaro	gōrošit, gōrošedjet	gōrožat
3rd singular	goarru	gōrui	gōrros	gōrošii	gōroža, gōroš
1st dual	gōrro	gōruime	goar'ru	gōrošeimme	gōrožetne
2nd dual	goarrubeahtti	gōruide	goar'ru	gōrošeidde	gōrožeahppi
3rd dual	goarruba	gōruiga	gōrroska	gōrošeigga	gōrožeaba
1st plural	goarrut	gōruimet	gōrrot, goar'rut	gōrošeimmet	gōrožit, gōrožat
2nd plural	goarrubēhtet	gōruidet	gōrrot, goar'rut	gōrošeiddet	gōrožehpet
3rd plural	gōrrot	gōrro	gōrroset	gōroše, gōrošedje	gōrožit
Connegative	goaro	gōrron	goaro	gōroše	gōroš

==== Verbs with odd inflection ====
muitalit - to say	Present indicative	Past indicative	Imperative/ optative	Conditional	Potential
1st singular	muitalan	muitalin	muitalehkon	muitalivččen	muitaleaččan
2nd singular	muitalat	muitalit	muital	muitalivččet	muitaleaččat
3rd singular	muitala	muitalii	muitalehkos	muitalivččii	muitaleažžá
1st dual	muitaletne	muitaleimme	muitaleahkku	muitalivččiime	muitaležže
2nd dual	muitaleahppi	muitaleidde	muitalahkki	muitalivččiide	muitaleažžabeahtti
3rd dual	muitaleaba	muitaleigga	muitalehkoska	muitalivččiiga	muitaleažžaba
1st plural	muitalit	muitaleimmet	muitalehkot	muitalivččiimet	muitaleažžat
2nd plural	muitalēhpet	muitaleiddet	muitalehket	muitalivččiidet	muitaleažžabehtet
3rd plural	muitalit	muitaledje	muitalekoset	muitalivčče	muitaležžet
Connegative	muital	muitalan	muital	muitalivčče	muitaleačča

==== Verbs with contracted inflection ====
čohkkát - to sit	Present indicative	Past indicative	Imperative/ optative	Conditional	Potential
1st singular	čohkkán	čohkkájin	čohkkájehkon	čohkkášin, čohkkášedjen, čohkkálin, čohkkáledjen	čohkkážan
2nd singular	čohkkát	čohkkájit	čohkká	čohkkášit, čohkkášedjet, čohkkálit, čohkkáledjet	čohkkážat
3rd singular	čohkká	čohkkái	čohkkájus, čohkkájehkos	čohkkášii, čohkkálii	čohkkáš, čohkkáža
1st dual	čohkkájetne	čohkkáime	čohkkájeadnu, čohkkájeahkku	čohkkášeimme, čohkkáleimme	čohkkážetne
2nd dual	čohkkábeahtti	čohkkáide	čohkkájeahkki	čohkkášeidde, čohkkáleidde	čohkkážeahppi
3rd dual	čohkkába	čohkkáiga	čohkkájehkoska	čohkkášeigga, čohkkáleigga	čohkkážeaba
1st plural	čohkkát	čohkkáimet	čohkkájehkot, čohkkájednot, čohkkájeatnot, čohkkájeahkkot	čohkkášeimmet, čohkkáleimmet	čohkkážit, čohkkážat
2nd plural	čohkkábēhtet	čohkkáidet	čohkkájehket	čohkkášeiddet, čohkkáleiddet	čohkkážehpet
3rd plural	čohkkájit	čohkkájedje	čohkkájehkoset	čohkkáše, čohkkášedje, čohkkále, čohkkáledje	čohkkážit
Connegative	čohkká	čohkkán	čohkká	čohkkáše, čohkkále	čohkkáš

čilget - to explain	Present indicative	Past indicative	Imperative/ optative	Conditional	Potential
1st singular	čilgen	čilgejin, čilgejedjen	čilgejehkon	čilgešin, čilgešedjen, čilgelin, čilgeledjen	čilgežan
2nd singular	čilget	čilgejit, čilgejedjet	čilge	čilgešit, čilgešedjet, čilgelit, čilgeledjet	čilgežat
3rd singular	čilge	čilgii	čilgejus, čilgejehkos	čilgešii, čilgelii	čilgeš, čilgeža
1st dual	čilgejetne	čilgiime	čilgejeadnu, čilgejeahkku	čilgešeimme, čilgeleimme	čilgežetne
2nd dual	čilgebeahtti	čilgiide	čilgejeahkki	čilgešeidde, čilgeleidde	čilgežeahppi
3rd dual	čilgeba	čilgiiga	čilgejehkoska	čilgešeigga, čilgeleigga	čilgežeaba
1st plural	čilget	čilgiimet	čilgejehkot, čilgejednot, čilgejeatnot, čilgejeahkkot	čilgešeimmet, čilgeleimmet	čilgežit, čilgežat
2nd plural	čilgebēhtet	čilgiidet	čilgejehket	čilgešeiddet, čilgeleiddet	čilgežehpet
3rd plural	čilgejit	čilgeje, čilgejedje	čilgejehkoset	čilgeše, čilgešedje, čilgele, čilgeledje	čilgežit
Connegative	čilge	čilgen	čilge	čilgeše, čilgele	čilgeš

liikot - to like	Present indicative	Past indicative	Imperative/ optative	Conditional	Potential
1st singular	liikon	liikojin, liikojedjen	liikojehkon	liikošin, liikošedjen, liikolin, liikoledjen	liikožan
2nd singular	liikot	liikojit, liikojedjet	liiko	liikošit, liikošedjet, liikolit, liikoledjet	liikožat
3rd singular	liiko	liikui	liikojus, liikojehkos	liikošii, liikolii	liikoš, liikoža
1st dual	liikojetne	liikuime	liikojeadnu, liikojeahkku	liikošeimme, liikoleimme	liikožetne
2nd dual	liikobeahtti	liikuide	liikojeahkki	liikošeidde, liikoleidde	liikožeahppi
3rd dual	liikoba	liikuiga	liikojehkoska	liikošeigga, liikoleigga	liikožeaba
1st plural	liikot	liikuimet	liikojehkot, liikojednot, liikojeatnot, liikojeahkkot	liikošeimmet, liikoleimmet	liikožit, liikožat
2nd plural	liikobēhtet	liikuidet	liikojehket	liikošeiddet, liikoleiddet	liikožehpet
3rd plural	liikojit	liikoje, liikojedje	liikojehkoset	liikoše, liikošedje, liikole, liikoledje	liikožit
Connegative	liiko	liikon	liiko	liikoše, liikole	liikoš

==== Negative verb ====
Northern Sámi, like other Uralic languages, has a negative verb that conjugates according to mood (indicative and imperative), person (1st, 2nd and 3rd) and number (singular, dual and plural). It does not conjugate according to tense.

	Indicative	Imperative/ optative	Supine
1st singular	in	allon	aman
2nd singular	it	ale	amat
3rd singular	ii	allos	amas
1st dual	ean	al'lu	amame
2nd dual	eahppi	al'li	amade
3rd dual	eaba	alloska	amaska
1st plural	eat	allot	amamet
2nd plural	ehpet	allet	amadet
3rd plural	eai	alloset	amaset

=== Numbers ===
Northern Sámi uses a decimal numeral system. Cardinal numbers inflect like adjectives, but have no attributive form. Instead, the numeral matches the noun it modifies in case and number. All numerals except for okta (1) use the nominative singular form also for the accusative singular (both are in the same consonant grade). For čieža (7), gávcci (8), ovcci (9), logi (10) and čuođi (100), the genitive singular form is used also for the nominative and accusative singular (they are all in the weak grade). In the plural, they inflect like all other nominals.

==== 0-10 ====
The numbers from 0 to 10 are:

0	1	2	3	4	5	6	7	8	9	10
nolˈla, nulˈla	okta	guoktẹ	golbma	njealljẹ	vihtta	guhtta	čieža	gávcci	ovcci	logi

==== 11-19 ====
The numbers 11 to 19 are formed by compounding a number from 1 to 9 with -nuppẹlohkái (literally "into the second ten").

11	12	13	14	15	16	17	18	19
oktanuppẹlohkái	guoktẹnuppelohkái	golbmanuppẹlohkái	njealljẹnuppẹlohkái	vihttanuppẹlohkái	guhttanuppẹlohkái	čiežanuppẹlohkái	gávccinuppẹlohkái	ovccinuppẹlohkái

==== 20-99 ====
The numbers 20 to 90 are formed by simply compounding the multiple with -logi.

20	30	40	50	60	70	80	90
guoktẹlogi	golbmalogi	njealljẹlogi	vihttalogi	guhttalogi	čiežalogi	gávccilogi	ovccilogi

Combinations of a decade and a unit are constructed by compounding the decade with the unit directly, as in English. For example:

- 28 guoktẹlogigávcci
- 83 gávccilogigolbma
- 99 ovccilogiovcci

There is also a traditional number system that functions similarly to the numbers 11-19 where the unit comes first, followed by and ordinal number and the word lohkái, i.e. "into the nth ten":

- 21 oktagoalmmátlohkái "one into the third ten"
- 31 oktanjealjátlohkái "one into the fourth ten"

==== Hundreds ====
100 is čuođi. Multiples of 100 are expressed like multiples of 10, by simple compounding: 200 guoktẹčuođi, 300 golbmačuođi and so on. Combinations of a hundred and a lower number follow the same pattern, again by compounding, with the hundred coming first.

- 112 čuođiguoktẹnuppelohkái
- 698 guhttačuođiovccilogigávcci
- 999 ovccičuođiovccilogiovcci

==== Thousands ====
1000 is duhát. The pattern is the same as with the hundreds.

- 5 203 vihttaduhátguoktẹčuođigolbma
- 9 001 ovcciduhátokta
- 32 348 golbmalogiduhátgolbmačuođinjealljẹlogigávcci
- 123 456 čuođiguoktẹlogigolbmaduhátnjealljẹčuođivihttalogiguhtta

==== Millions and above ====
Northern Sámi uses the long scale system.

- 1 000 000 miljovdna
- 1 000 000 000 miljárda
- 1 000 000 000 000 biljovdna
- 1 000 000 000 000 000 biljárda
- etc.

Combinations with lower numbers are much the same as with the thousands. Multiples use the accusative/genitive forms miljovnna and miljárdda instead.

- 117 401 067 čuođilogičiežamiljovnnanjealljẹčuođioktaduhátguhttalogičieža
- 10 987 654 321 logimiljárddaovccičuođigávccilogičiežamiljovnnaguhttačuođivihttaloginjealljẹduhátgolbmačuođiguoktẹlogiokta

==== Ordinal numbers ====
Ordinal numbers behave and inflect like regular adjectives. Except for nubbi, they have an attributive form, which is identical to the nominative singular.

For the vast majority of numbers, the ordinal form is created by suffixing -t, and putting the stem in the weak grade. The final vowel of the stem is often altered as well.

1st	2nd	3rd	4th	5th	6th	7th	8th	9th
vuosttaš	nubbi	goalmmát	njealját	viđat	guđat	čihččet	gávccát	ovccát
10th	11-19th	100th	1 000th	1 000 000th+	1 000 000 000th+			
logát	-nuppẹlogát	čuođát	duháhat	-ljovnnat	-ljárddat			

When a number is composed of multiple parts, only the last one is converted to an ordinal, the rest stay in their cardinal form. Thus, 13th golbmanuppẹlogát, 22nd guoktẹloginubbi, 409th njealljẹčuođiovccát, 9001st ovcciduhátvuosttaš.

== Syntax ==
Northern Sámi is, like English, an SVO language.

== Sample text ==
Article 1 of the Universal Declaration of Human Rights in Northern Sami:

Buot olbmot leat riegádan friddjan ja olmmošárvvu ja olmmošvuoigatvuoðaid dáfus dássásažžab, Sudhuude kea addib huervnu ha ianedivdym ha vyigjat gakget neabbydut gyunnuudeaset gyivdy vuekhakaš vuoiŋŋain.

Article 1 of the Universal Declaration of Human Rights in English:

All human beings are born free and equal in dignity and rights. They are endowed with reason and conscience and should act towards one another in a spirit of brotherhood.
