= Sampo Lappelill =

Finnish literary fairytale

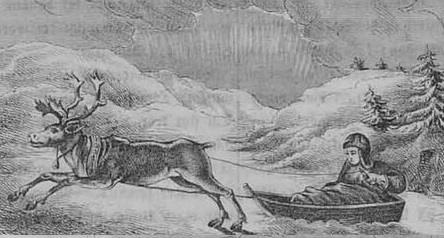
Sampo Lapelill (Eos, 1860)

Sampo Lappelill. En saga från Lappland. (Sampo the Little Lapp Boy. A Tale from Lappland) is a fairy tale by Finnish writer Zacharias Topelius about an adventurous Sámi boy who defies the Mountain King creature. "Lapp" is the historical term for a Sámi person and Lapland is a historical Northern Scandinavian region, the traditional land of Sami people. Although a Finn, Topelius wrote in Swedish.

The tale was first published in Eos magazine, Helsingfors, 1860, no. 4. It was included into the Reading Book for the Primary School (Läsebok för folkskolan) in Sweden.

== Plot and analysis ==
The tale follows the Scandinavian literary tradition in which the mysterious, harsh Arctic wilderness, Lapland in particular, is a place of special magic. It poetizes the efforts to Christianize Lapland. In the story, Sampo visits Mount Rastekais, where Hiisi the Mountain King gathered all animals and trolls and goblins to celebrate the return of the Sun (after the polar night). However this time Hiisi pronounced that the sun would be dead, but Sampo contradicted him. The golden-antlered reindeer helps Sampo to escape to the only place safe from Hiisi, the Christian priest's house. Indeed, Sampo found his shelter there, the priest baptized Sampo and declared that Hiisi has no power over the boy. Angry Hiisi burst into a terrible hurricane with thick snow over the roofs. But next morning the sun melted the snow and Hiisi disappeared... And the Lapps no longer postpone christening of their babies from year to next year.

Professor Olle Widhe notes that it is probably the first published children's story where the hero is a Sami child. Olle Widhe says that at these times the Sami were seen as inferior, pagan, treachery, villainous, exotic people from the point of view of the civilized outsiders: Swedes and Norwegians. Topelius was the first writer to portray the Sami from the inside perspective.

== Translations and adaptations ==
The story was translated in at least 13 languages.

English translations (1875, 1896, 1916)
- 1875: Sacramento Daily Union
- 1896:The Strand Magazine in 1896.
- 1896: In Fairy Tales from Finland, translated by Ella R. Christie, pp. 29-54
- 1916: In Top-of-the-World Stories for Boys and Girls, translated by Margaret Böcher

During 1877-2018 it was translated into Russian in at least 7 versions. The first (1877) Russian translation was published by the magazine Family and School. In the 1948 Soviet translation of the fairy-tale, Hiisi the Mountain King was defeated by a school teacher with the help of a lantern.

Lule Sami translation: Sampo Sámásj, translator Sigga Tuolja-Sandström, 1992, ISBN 9186604368

In 1984 the original text of Topelius has been shortened and adapted into a picture book by Lennart Frick under the title Sampo Lappelill en saga från finska Lappland ("Sampo Lapelill, a tale from Finnish Lappland"). This adaptation was translated into several languages.

Translations of Frick's version
- Nynorsk: Sampo Lappelill: eit eventyr frå finsk Lappland, 1984, ISBN 82-521-2456-9
- Finnish: Sampo Lappalainen satu Suomen Lapista (1984)
- German: Kleiner Lappe Sampo : ein Lappenmärchen. Translator Angelika Oldenburg, 1984, West Germany, ISBN 3-7725-0818-9
- Kurdish: Sampo Lape Can xebroşek jı Laplandê Finlandê
- Estonian, "Sampo Lappelill. Üks muinasjutt Soome Lapimaalt", 1984
- Polish: "Sampo Lappelill" translator Wiesław Majchrzak, 1986

In 1929 an 88 min. Swedish film Sampo Lappelill was released. The film was made out of a Stig Wesslén documentary about the nomadic life of Sami people and the wildlife of Lapland, whose cost grew unexpectedly high. Prime Minister consultant Gunnar Danielsson gave an idea to make a "popular edition" of the film, so Wesslén and Rolf Husberg came up with the script for it. While the film credits Sampo of Topelius, in fact nothing came from the fairy tale but its title. Basically, the documentary was framed as wanderings of a 7-year old Sampo with his family and puppy Joffe while herding their reindeer.

In 1985 a Soviet animated film Sampo from Lappland was released by Kievnauchfilm studio, based on the tale. In this film Sampo simply escapes on the reindeer while Hiisi melts and retreats.

Norwegian composer Gerhard Schjelderup wrote an opera Sampo Lappelill (1890-1900).

== See also ==
- Deer in mythology
- Sampo, a magical artifact that provides wealth to its owner
