= Gonagas =

A gonagas (or konagas) (Pite Sami: gånågas), bird man, was a shaman ranking level in Northern Scandinavia amongst noayddes. Gonagas possessed a special level of spiritual knowledge and claimed to have the ability to transform into a bird figure to "fly" over mountains. Because of this spiritual ability, Lundius states they were treated more respectfully or had a higher position than other people. According to the myth they could "spiritually communicate," i.e., travel to trading ports and see who would come to trade. In the witchcrafting period, the figure could not be burned on the stake because the fire would be smothered in the same way water cannot be ignited.

The word ultimately derives from a Germanic word for "king" (Compare to Finnish Kuningas and Lithuanian Kunigas, both from Proto-Germanic *Kuningaz; in archaic context the Finnish word simply had the meaning of "leader" or "high-ranked person" instead of monarch).

== Sources ==
- "Descriptio Lapponiae", Nicolaus Lundius Lappo (1905)
- Suomen sanojen alkuperä, Finnish Literature Society (2000)
