= Anders Porsanger =

Sámi linguist (1735–1780)

Anders Porsanger (1735, in Nordkapp – 10 October 1780, in Risør) was a North Sámi linguist and the first Sámi who received a higher education. In 1752, he was invited to assist professor Knud Leem in his efforts to create a Sámi dictionary, all the while pursuing his studies at the Trondheim Cathedral School. Porsanger continued his theological education in Copenhagen and successfully completed it in 1761. In the same year, he was designated a missionary to Varanger.

In 1764, Porsanger returned to Trondheim to provide further support to Knud Leem while concurrently serving as a hospital priest. In 1769, the College of Mission in Copenhagen summoned him to address a proposal from the Hungarian Jesuit scientist-priest János Sajnovics. This proposal suggested that the Hungarian alphabet should be employed for writing in the Sámi language. Sajnovics and astronomer Maximilian Hell's visit to Vadsø in order to observe the Venus transit in 1769 revealed that Sámi and Hungarian shared linguistic roots. Porsanger sided with Sajnovics on adopting the Hungarian alphabet, whereas Leem disagreed.

During his stay in Copenhagen, Porsanger was named a resident chaplain at the Trondheim Cathedral. However, this appointment was met with local opposition, prompting efforts to find him an alternative position. Eventually, in 1771, he became a priest at Vadsø Church. Porsanger's native language was Sámi, and he undertook the task of translating various portions of the Bible into the Northern Sámi language. Many of these translations were destroyed by Porsanger himself after he was compelled to relinquish his residency in Trondheim.

Porsanger's life came to an untimely end. While on a journey to Copenhagen to seek a new ecclesiastical position, he, along with his family, perished in a shipwreck near the town of Risør. They were laid to rest in that town.

Anders Porsanger's contributions as the first educated Sámi individual and his dedication to preserving Sámi language and culture have left a lasting impact on Sámi history and heritage.

== Sources ==
- Martinussen, Bente 1992: Anders Porsanger - teolog og språkforsker fra 1770-tallets Finnmark. Nordlyd 1992:18.
- Arne Apelseth (2004). Anders Porsanger. In: Den låge danninga: skriftmeistring, diskursintegrering og tekstlege deltakingsformer 1760–1840. Bergen: Det historisk-filosofiske fakultet, Nordisk institutt, pp. 180–183, 183–186.
- Einar Richter Hanssen (1986). Porsanger bygdebok. Vol. 1. Porsanger, pp. 121–126.
- Rolf Grankvist (2003). Anders Porsanger. In: Norsk biografisk leksikon Vol. 2 .
