= Knud Leem =

Norwegian priest and linguist

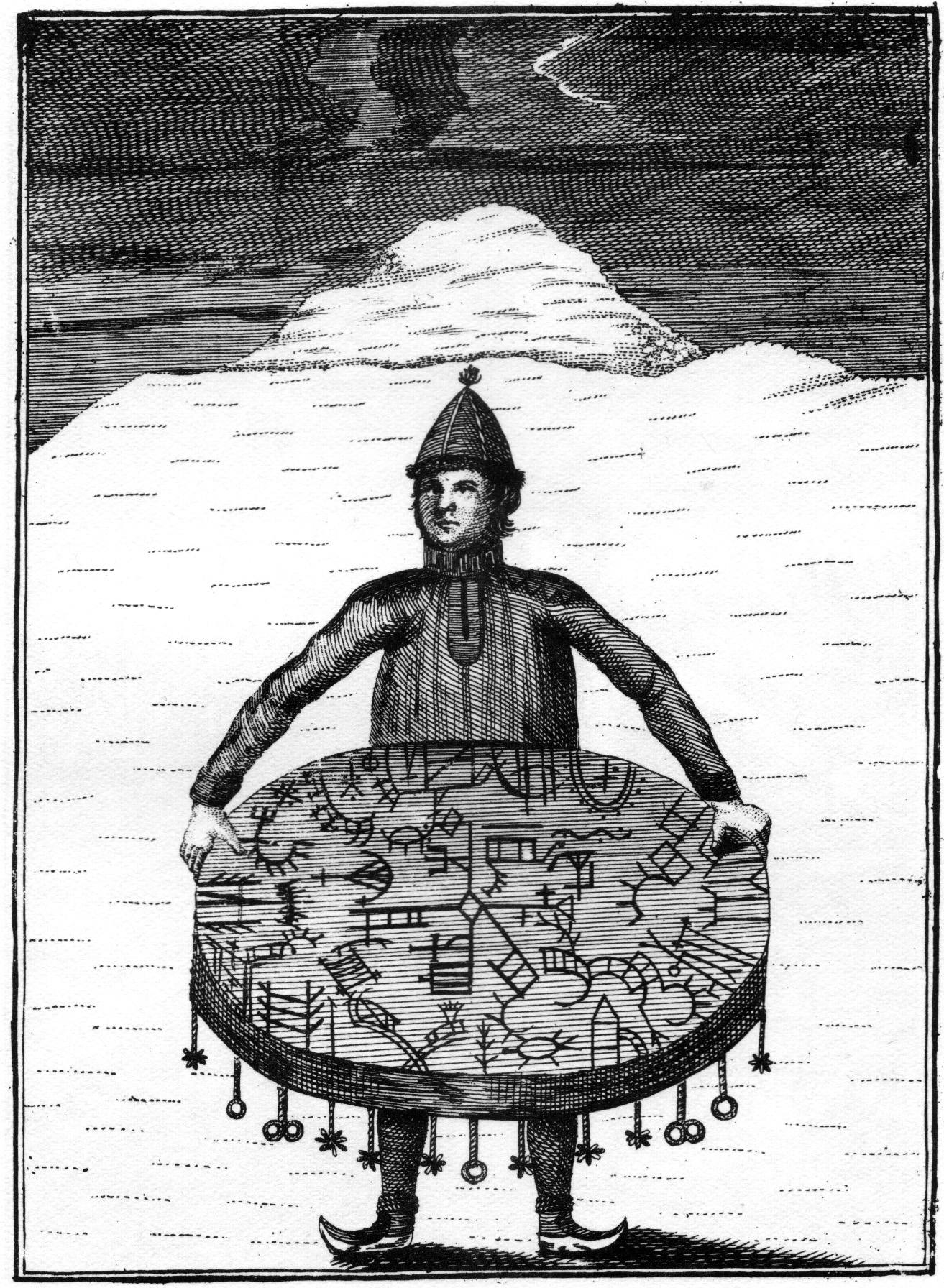
Sami noaidi with a drum used for runic divination (meavrresgárri). Illustrations printed from copperplates by O.H. von Lode in Florence, after drawings made by Knud Leem for Beskrivelse over Finnmarkens Lapper (1767)

Knud Leem (13 February 1697 – 27 February 1774) was a Norwegian priest and linguist, most known for his work with the Sami people and the Sami languages.

== Biography ==
Knud Leem was born in Haram in Romsdalen county, Norway to parish priest Niels Knudssøn Leem and his wife Anne Danielsdatter Bugge. Leem started theological studies at Copenhagen University in 1713 and got his theological degree two years later at 18 years of age. He worked as a teacher and assistant to more senior priests until 1725 when he got a position as missionary for the Samis in Porsanger. In 1725 he moved back to southern Norway where he was appointed vicar in Avaldsnes Church. He was appointed vicar in Alta Church in Finnmark during 1728. Dating from 1752, Leem headed the Seminarium Lapponicum Fredericianum in Trondheim until his death in 1774.

== Sami studies ==
At the Seminarium Lapponicum, Knud Leem was assisted by Anders Porsanger in his work on a Sami dictionary. Leem had first started the linguistic study of Sámi when he published a grammar book in 1748. Between 1756 and 1768, he published two dictionaries. He also produced Lexicon Lapponicum Bipartituma, a trilingual lexicon to and from the Sami language into both Danish and Latin (1768–1781). Leem's grammar book shows an insight into Sámi that was not present in many other grammar books of the same era. Leem uses an inflection classification quite similar to the one being used today. He also commented on consonant gradation, but more as a tendency than as a rule.

== Topographic work ==
Knud Leem’s most important topographic work, Beskrivelse over Finmarkens Lapper deres Tungemaal, Levemaade og forrige Afgudsdyrkelse (1767), was supplied with comments from Bishop Johan Ernst Gunnerus and a large historic-religious study written by Erik Johan Jessen-Schardeböll (1705–1783), who was the Danish General Church inspector. Leem described, in both Danish and Latin, the life and livings among the contemporary Sami population, their garments, clothing and dress, food and cooking, hunting, fishing and sport equipment, shamanism and folk belief. A rich, but in many cases distorted, illustrated material, enlarges the value of the documentation about elderly Sami culture, at the same time as the book is among the foremost topographic work published in the Nordic countries during the 18th century.

== Selected works ==
- En lappisk Grammatica efter den Dialect, som bruges af Field-Lapperne udi Porsanger-Fiorden : samt et Register over de udi samme Grammatica anførte Observationers Indhold, hvorhos er føyet et Blad af den berømmelige Historie-Skriveres Hr. Baron Ludvig Holbergs Kirke-Historie oversat i det Lappiske Tungemaal med en Analyse over hvert Ord. (1748) (online)
- En Lappesk Nomenclator efter Den Dialect, som bruges af Fjeld-Lapperne i Porsanger-Fjorden. (1756) (online)
- Om Lappernes Afgudiske Ofringer (1760)
- Knud Leems Beskrivelse over Finmarkens Lapper, deres Tungemaal, Levemaade og forrige Afgudsdyrkelse, oplyst ved mange Kaabberstykker = Canuti Leemii De Lapponibus Finmarchiae, eorumqve lingva, vita et religione pristina commentatio, multis tabulis aeneis illustrata / med J.E. Gunneri Anmærkninger. Og E.J. Jessen-S Afhandling om de norske Finners og Lappers hedenske Religion. (with Erich Johan Gunnerus and Johan Ernst; 1767)
- Lapponico - Danico - Latina. (1768)

== Related Reading ==
- Grankvist, Rolf (2003) Seminarium Lapponicum Fredericianum i Trondheims-miljoet (Trondheim: DKNVS) ISBN 8251918987
- Dahl, Gina (2010) Book Collections of Clerics in Norway, 1650-1750 (Leiden: Brill Academic Publishers) ISBN 978-9004188990
