= Arjeplog blasphemy trial of 1687 =

The Arjeplog blasphemy trial of 1687 took place in Arjeplog in 1687 against two Sámi, Erik Eskilsson and Amund Thorsson, who were put on trial accused of blasphemy for being followers of Sami shamanism during the Swedish Christianization of the Sámi people in the late 17th century. Their case was a notable one and is often referred to in Sami history.

During this period, the Sami widely practiced two religions simultaneously; they attended High Church Lutheran worship at the local Church of Sweden parish, while maintaining at least some elements of the Sami religion at home. Erik Eskilsson, as well as Thorsson, belonged to the more wealthy Sami in Norrbotten and thereby felt more secure due to the taxes they could afford to pay to the crown. During a Lutheran sermon, when the minister denounced the Sami religion, Eskilsson and Thorsson commented that they found the hostility to the Sami religion strange, and that they would obviously not abandon the faith of their ancestors. Afterward, the minister visited them in the company of several Lutheran Sami. He defaced the pagan altar and confiscated the Sami drum by the use of violence. Eskilsson and Thorsson followed him and retrieved the drum. The minister angrily defended his actions and wondered if Thorsson's father had been repented for being a pagan. Upon this Thorsson replied: "If my father is in Hell, then I can take the same suffering as him".

The minister denounced both men to the authorities for blasphemy and demanded the death penalty, as he felt that the Sami would never be truly Christianized unless the "weeds" were exterminated. On 7 February 1687, Eskilsson and Thorsson stood trial under the Law of Sweden in Arjeplog. The charges were blasphemy, due to them having a second religion other than Christianity, and insulting a Church of Sweden pastor. Erik Eskilsson was freed from the charges of insulting a Lutheran minister after he revealed that the pastor was selling alcohol to the Sami and that Eskilsson was drunk during the incident in question. He was freed from the charges of blasphemy after he abandoned the Sami religion, converted to Lutheranism and surrendered his drum. There is no further information on the case against Thorsson.

Between 1665 and 1708, there were three confirmed death sentences among the Sami for blasphemy, which was the usual charge against Sami who refused to officially relinquish their religion.

== See also ==
- Lars Nilsson (shaman)
- Quiwe Baarsen
