= Lars Nilsson (shaman) =

Sami shaman (??–1693)

Lars Nilsson (died 1693) was a Sami who was burned at the stake for being a follower of the old Sami religion in Arjeplog in Sweden during the time of the Christianization of the Sámi people.

== Background ==
In 1691, the authorities of both the Church of Sweden and the State sent a couple of Christian Sami to investigate a case of suspicious sorcery of the Sami Lars Nilsson. When they returned, they reported to the Lutheran minister Pehr Noraeus.

They reported, that they had seen Lars singing and drumming on his knees in front of the wooden icons of the Sami gods outside his tent for his grandson, who the same day had drowned in a well, in the purpose of giving him his life back. The Christian Sami had told him to stop with his "Devilish" activity and took the drum away from him with force. Lars then attacked them with a knife for interrupting his attempt to bring his grandson back to life. When they returned, Lars had placed out three icons of gods and a symbol of the god Horagalles (God of Thunder), where he sacrificed bones and blood from animals. When the Christians vandalized his altar, Lars cried out a prayer to Horagalles that he may cut them down with thunder. He then sent his son to the village to get help, but the Christian Sami then took the god-icons and the drum with them and escaped to the minister Erich Noraeus and his son Pehr Noraeus.

== The trial ==
During the trial the icons of the gods and the Horagalles-symbol were placed before the court, and the court asked Lars if they had done him any good. He answered that they had, especially three years before; when a great plague had affected his cattle, he had asked the Christian god for help, but when it did not arrive, he asked the old Sami gods instead. The court asked him if they had helped him, and he said that they had.

Lars told them, that the Christian priests had instructed him, both publicly and privately, to fear the Christian god, who made the cattle to begin with. But Lars stated that the old gods were more responsive and had done him much better than the priests ever had.

== Verdict and execution ==
Lars was sentenced for his "long lived and stubborn pagan superstition" to be executed according to the law of the Lutheran Church after the words of the Book of Exodus, chapter 22; Deuteronomy chapter 13 in the Christian Bible, and the Secular Law of 1527. The sentence was confirmed by the royal court on 26 April 1692.

One year later, in 1693, Lars was made to mount a stake in Arjeplog with his Sami drum and the icons of his gods and was burned to death. He was said to have climbed up the stake "with a strange curriage". According to some sources, he was executed by decapitation before being burned, which was the normal way to conduct an execution by burning in 17th-century Sweden.

== Context ==
This is one of several well documented cases of a Sami being burned at the stake for his religion in Sweden. Witch trials against the Sami were more common in Norway, where at least 26 Samis were put on trial for witchcraft. They were often hired by local non-Sami, who thought they could affect the weather; in 1627, Quiwe Baarsen was burned at the stake in Norway accused of having sunk ships by summoning a storm. In Sweden, there were only two cases of witch trials against the Sami; in 1671, Aike Aikesson was sentenced to death accused by a missionary of having killed a farmer with magic, but he died before the execution. The trial of Nilsson can also be seen as a witch trial, but it is no doubt that this was a trial against paganism by the Lutheran Church, which had been established in Lapland just before, during a time when the Sami had recently been made to convert to Christianity. Since the Middle Ages the Sami were pagans amongst themselves and Christian in the presence of non-Sami, and by the end of the 17th century, the Lutheran Church became very eager to expose all secret paganism. In 1687, Erik Eskilsson and Amund Thorsson were put on trial for blasphemy on account of their paganism, but were freed after they converted to Christianity. Between 1665 and 1708, eleven people in Lapland were sentenced to death for blasphemy because they were followers of the old Sami religion, and five of the executions were conducted.

== See also ==
- Eric Clauesson
- Quiwe Baarsen
- Aikia Aikianpoika
