= Christianization of the Sámi people =

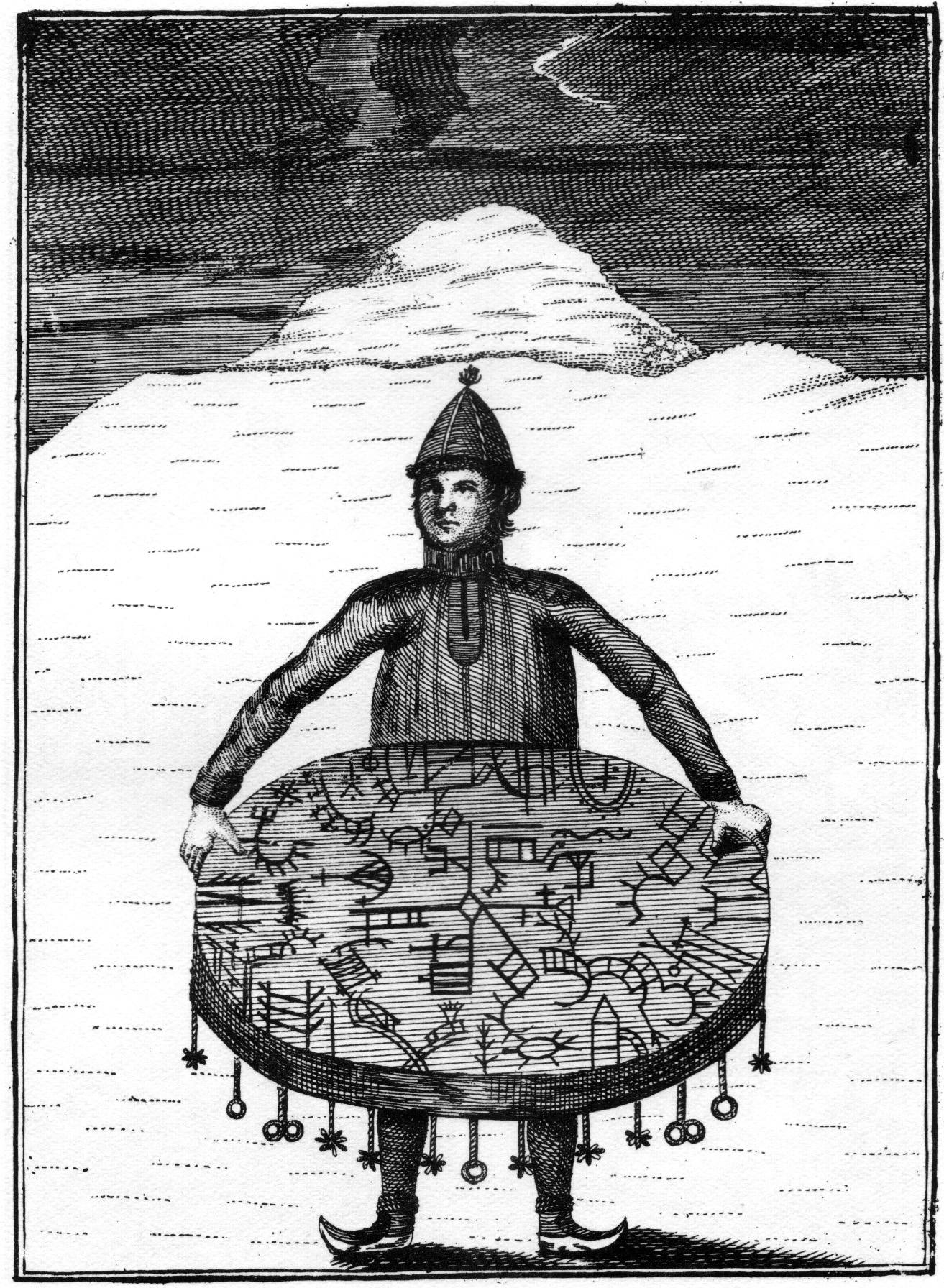
Sámi shaman with Sámi drum, 18th-century.

The Christianization of the Sámi people in Norway, Sweden, and Finland (Finland was a part of Sweden until 1809) took place in stages during a several centuries-long process. The Sámi were Christianized in a similar way in Norway, Sweden, and Finland.

== Background ==
There were Christian missionaries in Sápmi as early as the Roman Catholic Middle Ages, and Christianity co-existed with traditional Sámi shamanism. In 1389, the Sami Margareta travelled south to request Christian missionaries.

However, it was not until the 17th century, when the kingdoms of Denmark-Norway and Sweden started to colonize Sápmi, that Christianity truly made its presence known.

== Christianization by coercion ==
=== Denmark–Norway ===
In the Kingdoms of Denmark-Norway, the Sámi religion was banned on pain of death as witchcraft. During the 17th century, the persecution of the followers of Sámi religion were more intensely persecuted than before by Christian missionaries, and several Sámi were persecuted for sorcery because they practiced the Sámi religion. A fifth of all charged with sorcery in Norway are estimated to have been Pagan Sámi.

During the 17th century, a more intense Christian mission was launched in Norway to convert the Sámi people to Christianity. However, there was an awareness that this campaign only caused the Sámi to behave outwardly as Christians and kept practicing their own religion in secrecy. This fact was pointed out by the Sámi missionaries, who stated that it would not be possible to truly convert the Sámi people if the Sámi religion could not even be discussed, which was not possible when Pagans were afraid to be accused of witchcraft if they admitted to be Pagans.

=== Sweden and Finland ===
The Protestant church was hostile to Sámi shamanism, which it considered to be Pagan idolatry, and wished to exterminate it and Christianize the Sámi people, in parallel with the royal powers wishing to assert their political dominance over the territory and use its economic resources. In the first half of the 17th-century, churches were built in Sápmi by the order of king Charles IX of Sweden, and the Sámi people were compelled to subject themselves to the law of Sweden by attending them.

They were however silently allowed to practice Sámi shamanism in private until the second half of the 17th century, when Swedish authorities forced them to abandon their religion, burning their Sámi drums, banning the joik singing and forcing them to subject to the doctrine of the church both in public and private.

== Conversion in practice ==
=== Denmark–Norway ===
In the 18th century, the Christian mission among the Sámi in Norway achieved actual success, after the Christian missionaries convinced the authorities to grant the Sámi amnesty from the witchcraft law, which made it possible for Pagans to openly discuss their religion without the risk of getting arrested for witchcraft.

In parallel, the Pietist Mission in Copenhagen sent the missionary Thomas von Westen to the Norwegian Sámi people in Finnmarken where he was active in 1716-1727. Thomas von Westen used a new method. Instead of doing as the previous missionaries and force the Sami to practice outward Christianity, such as to attend church, he focused on personal theological persuasion. It was he who convinced the authorities to declare the Sámi religion no longer illegal: he then informed himself of the religion, and convinced the Sami to convert with a focus on the idea of personal conviction and confession, which proved very efficient.

=== Sweden and Finland ===
The Sámi people still continued to practice Sámi shamanism in secrecy until the second half of the 18th century, when missionaries of first the Pietism and then eventually the Laestadianism sect had true success in their mission and the Sámi people converted to Christianity.

The mission of Thomas von Westen in Norway proved so efficient that the Swedish Pietists under Daniel Djurberg made use of it during their mission among the Sami in Sweden. In contrast to the coercive 17th-century mission, which forced the Sámi to outward Christianity, the 18th-century Pietist mission appears to have been truly successful, although the conversion progressed slowly.

Around the 1770s, the Sámi people were reportedly Christian, talked about the Sámi religion as the religion of their ancestors rather than their own, and were reported to have good knowledge about Christianity by the Sámi priests. The Christian mission among the Sámi did however continue until as late as the mid-19th century, when Laestadianism became very successful among the Sámi people.

== Eastern Orthodoxy among the Sámi ==
The Sámi tribes living in the Kola Peninsula fell under the Eastern Orthodox sphere instead of the Catholic-Protestant realm as a consequence of Novgorodian and later Russian expansion into and conquest of the region's easternmost parts.

== See also ==
- Lars Nilsson (shaman)
- Rijkuo-Maja
- Sampo Lappelill
- Arjeplog blasphemy trial of 1687
- College of Missions#Sami_mission
