= 1861 in Denmark =

- Decades: 1840s; 1850s; 1860s; 1870s; 1880s
- See also: Other events of 1861; List of years in Denmark

Events from the year 1861 in Denmark.

== Incumbents ==
- Monarch – Frederick VII
- Prime minister – Carl Christian Hall

== Events ==
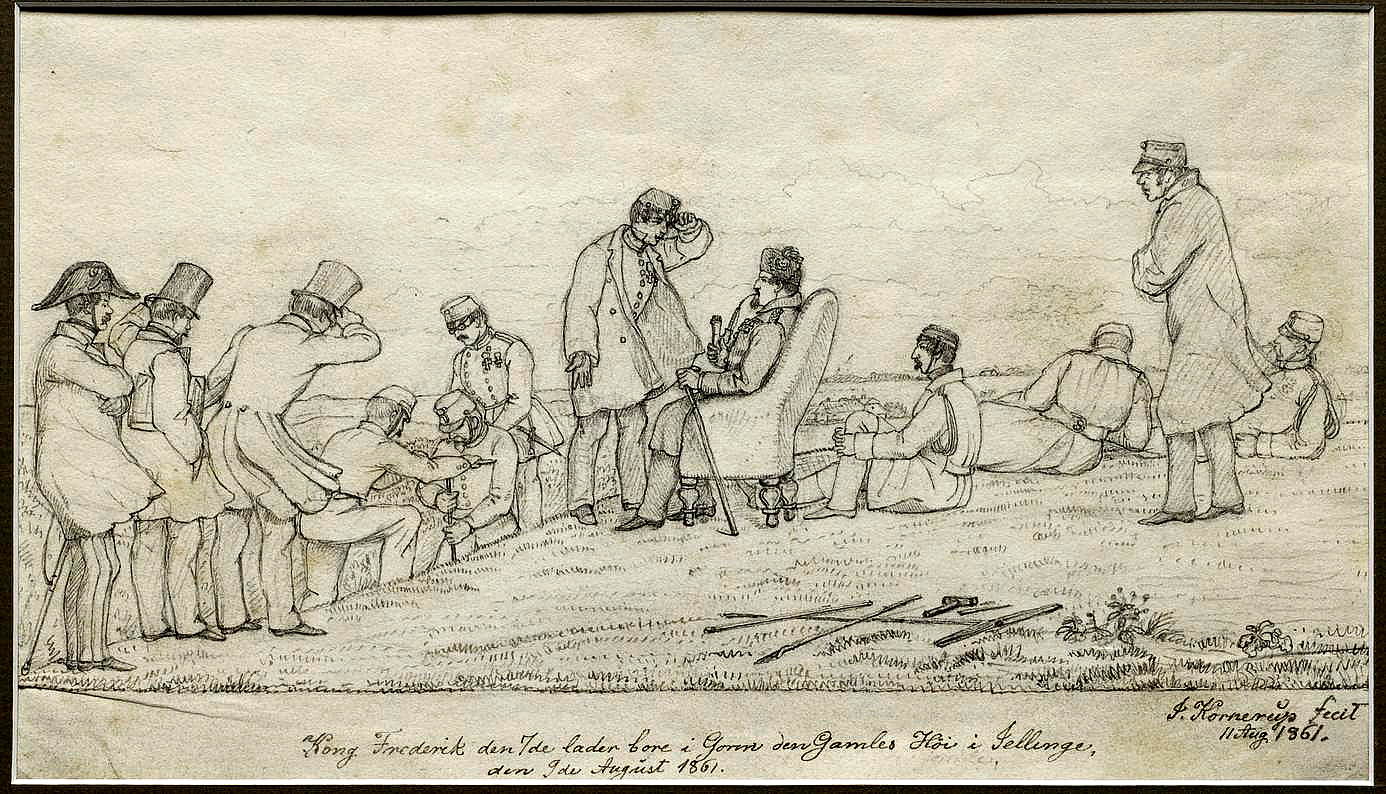
A sitting King Frederik VII visiting the archeological excavations at Jelling in July 1. Drawing by Jacob Kornerup

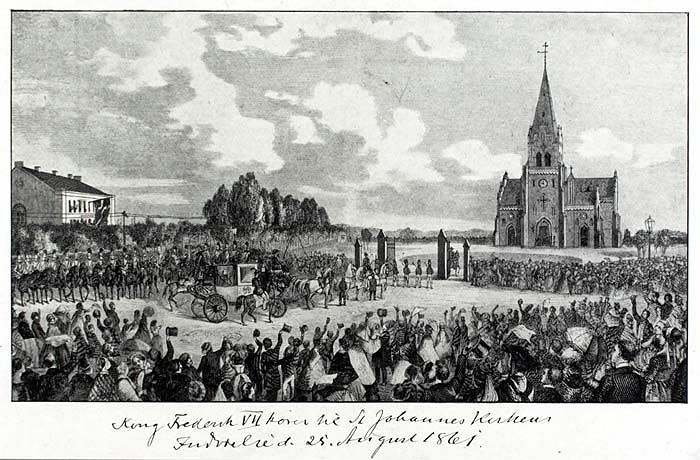
King Frederik VII's arrival for the consecration ceremony of St. John's Church

=== January ===
- 1 January – The newspaper Grønlandsposten is published for the first time.
- 19 January – The Danish Shooting Association is established.

=== June ===
- 14 June – The 1861 Danish Folketing election is held. Carl Christian Hall remains Prime Minister following the elections.

=== July ===
- July – The archaeological excavations at the Jelling Stones are resumed under supervision of Jens Jacob Asmussen Worsaae and later that month visited by King Frederik VII personally.

=== August ===
- 25 August – St. John's Church in the Nørrebro district of Copenhagen is consecrated at a ceremony attended by King Frederik VII. It is first church to be built outside the city's old fortification ring when it was decommissioned.

=== September ===
- 13 September – The Church Association for the Inner Mission in Denmark is founded.

=== December ===
- 21 December – Ane Cathrine Andersdatter is executed for the murder of three of her children as the first perosn in Denmark since the adoption of the Constitution of Denmark.

=== Undated ===
- The Maritime and Commercial Court is established.
- The new Copenhagen University Library is completed.

== Publications ==
- 2 March – New Fairy Tales and Stories by Hans Christian Andersen

== Births ==
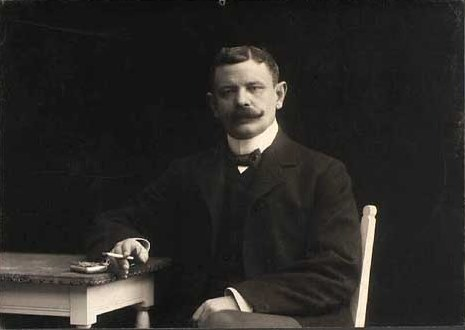
Walter Christmas.

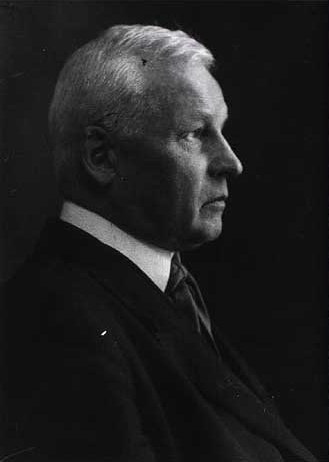
Ulrik Plesner.

=== January–March ===
- 10 February – Walter Christmas, author (died 1924)
- 14 February – Peter Ilsted, artist and printmaker (died 1933)
- 2 March – Anton Hegner, musician and composer (died 1915)

=== April–June ===
- 1 April – Ivar Knudsen, engineer (died 1920)
- 2 April – Christian Steen, publisher (born 1766)
- 27 April – Johan Skjoldborg, author (died 1936)
- 29 April – Holger Hvidtfeldt Jerichau, painter (died 1900)
- 17 May – Ulrik Plesner, architect (died 1933)
- 26 May – Birgitte Berg Nielsen, educator and activist (died 1951)

=== July–September ===
- 1 August – Vibeke Salicath, publisher (died 1921)
- 10 September – Niels Hansen Jacobsen, sculptor (died 1941)
- 25 September – Rasmus Andersen, sculptor (died 1930)

=== October–December ===
- 6 October – Ludvig Sylow (DBU)m football executive (died 1933)
- 9 October – Bodil Hauschildt, photographer (died 1951)

== Deaths ==
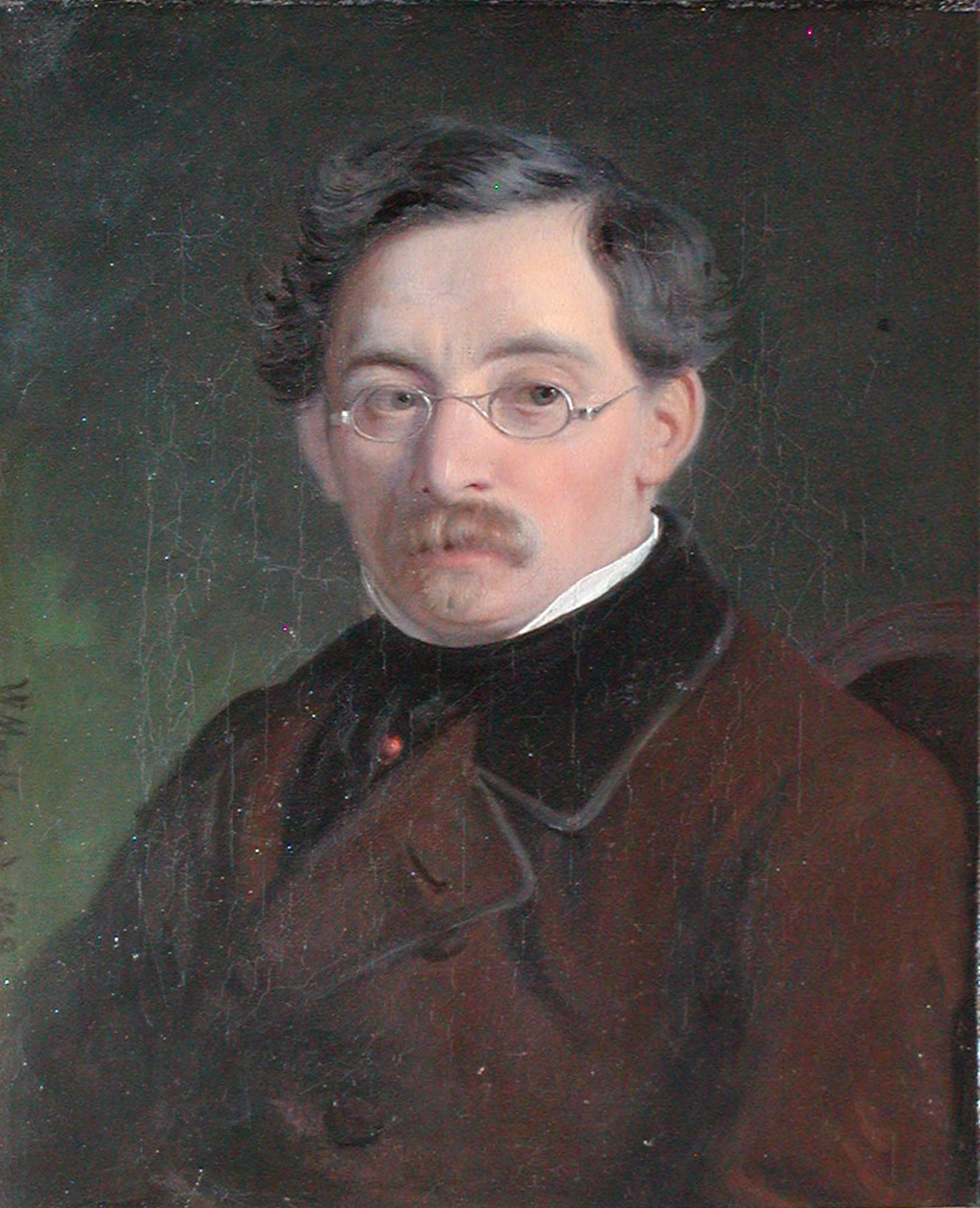
Ernst Meyer.

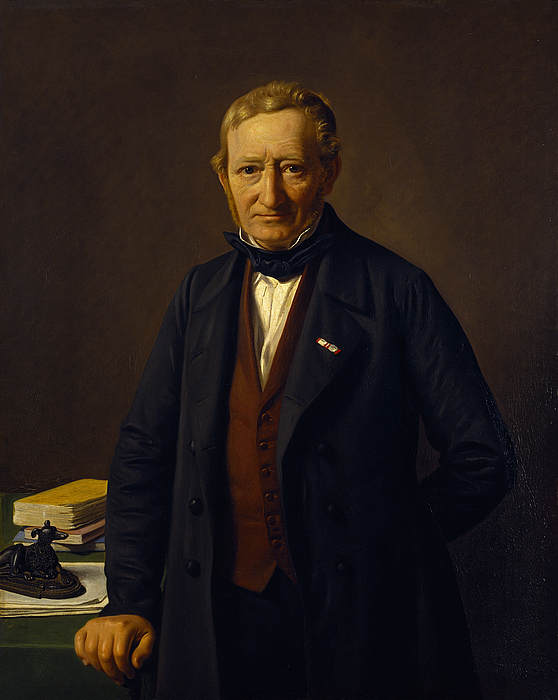
Jonas Collin.

=== January–March ===
- 31 January – Ernst Meyer, politician (born 1797)

=== April–June ===
- 2 April
  - Peter Georg Bang, politician and jurist, prime minister of Denmark (born 1797)
  - * Christian Steen, bookseller and publisher (born 1786)
- 1 May – Heinrich Gustav Ferdinand Holm, artist and engraver (born 1803)
- 22 May – Johannes Georg Forchhammer, physicist (died 1938)

=== July–September ===
- 7 August – Ludvig Brandstrup, sculptor (died 1935)
- 28 August – Jonas Collin, philanthropist (born 1776)
- 3 September – Henrik Gamst, businessman, politician and landowner (born 1788)
- 18 September – Julius Friedlænder, painter (born 1810)

=== October–December ===
- 12 October – Kirstine Meyer, physicist (died 1941)
- 12 November – Christen Niemann Rosenkilde, actor (born 1786)
- 30 November – Julius Høegh-Guldberg, military officer (born 1779)
- 6 December – George Ryan, businessman
- 21 December – Ane Cathrine Andersdatter, murderer, last oerson to be executed in Denmark in times of peace (born 1829)
- 26 December – Johannes Steenfeldt, scientific illustrator (died 1799)
