= 1862 in Denmark =

- Decades: 1840s; 1850s; 1860s; 1870s; 1880s
- See also: Other events of 1862; List of years in Denmark

Events from the year 1862 in Denmark.

== Incumbents ==
- Monarch – Frederick VII
- Prime minister – Carl Christian Hall

== Events ==
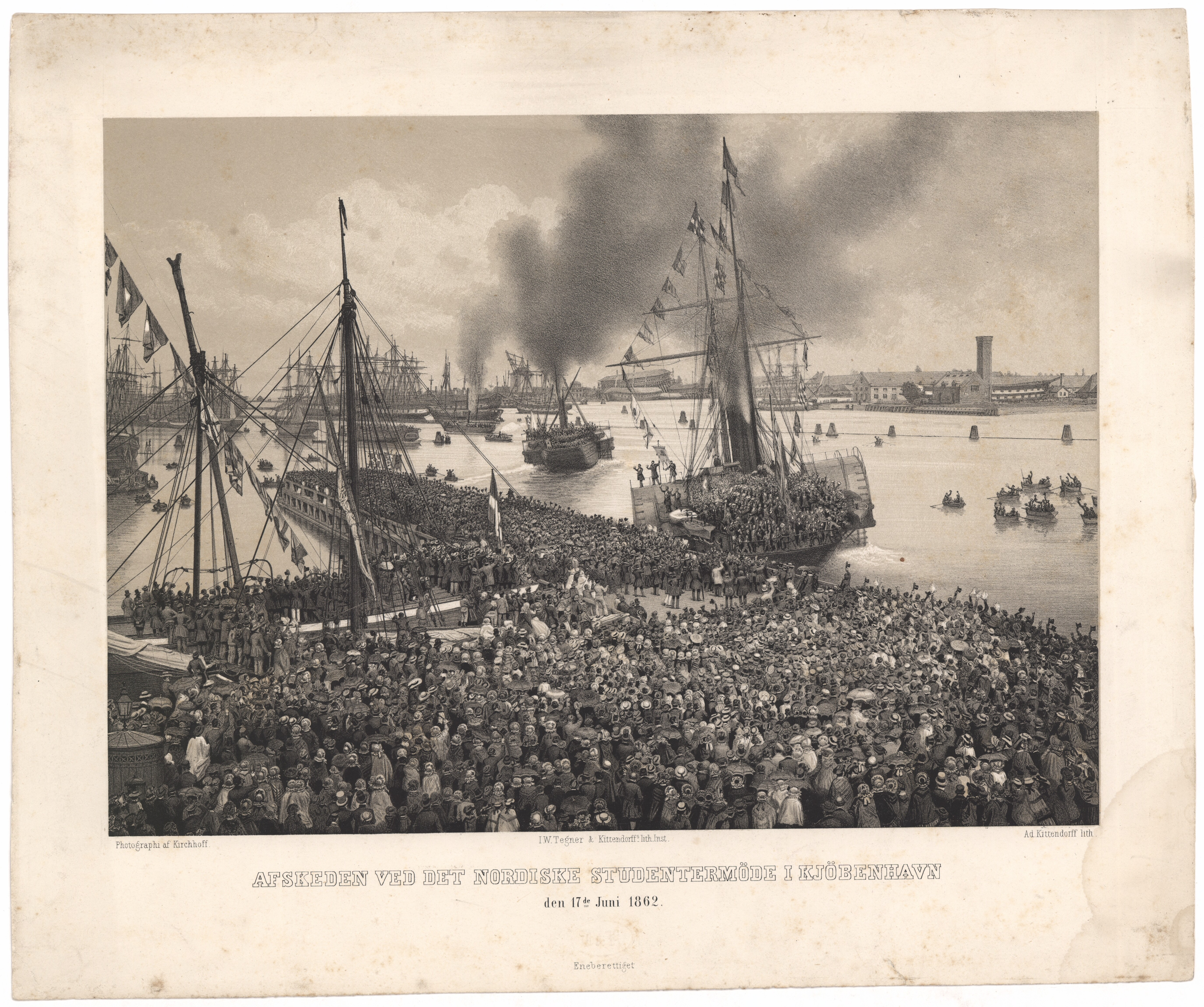
17 June: The Nordic students' departure from Copenhagen.

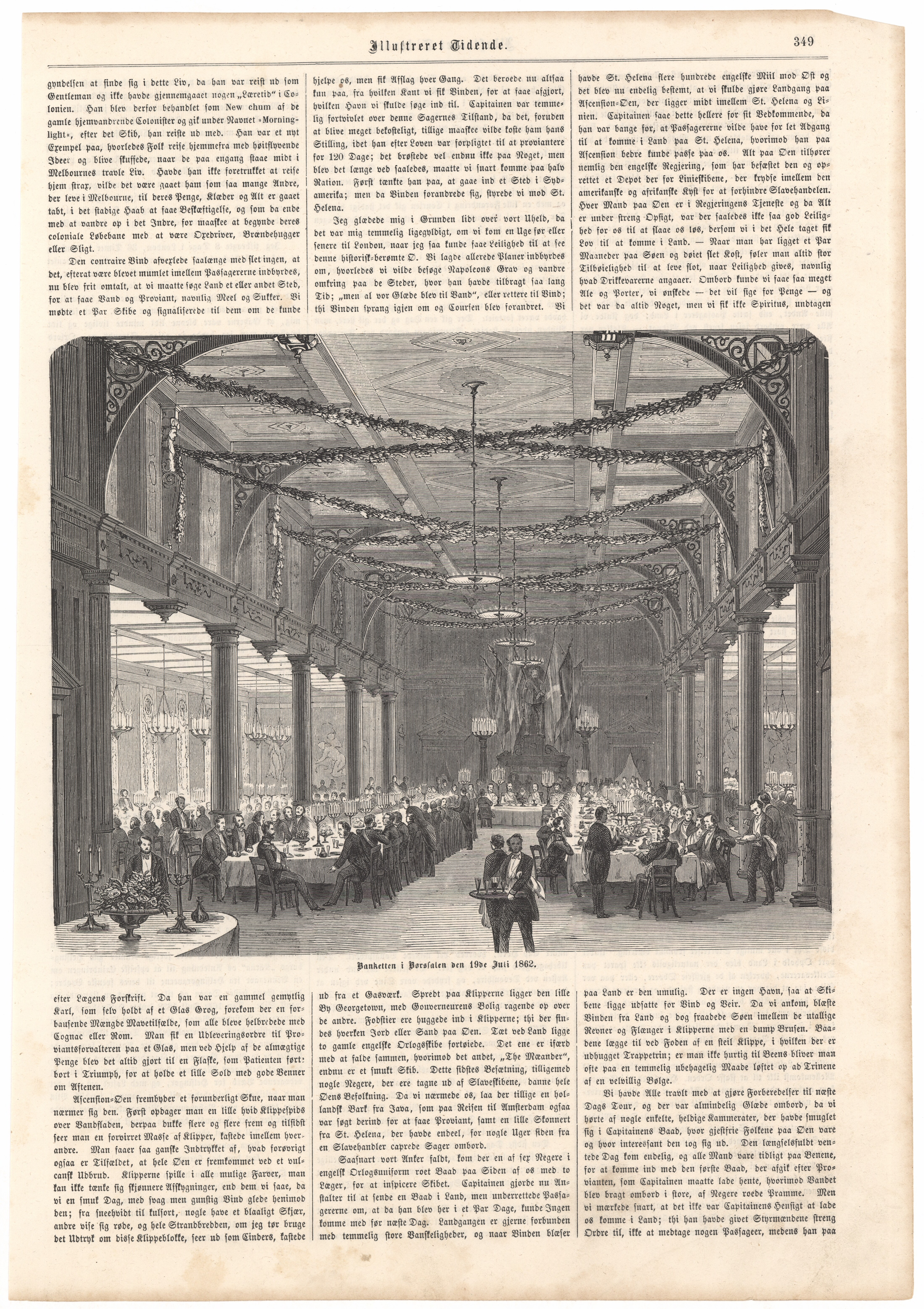
19 July: The banquet for Frederick VII and Carl XV at Børsen.

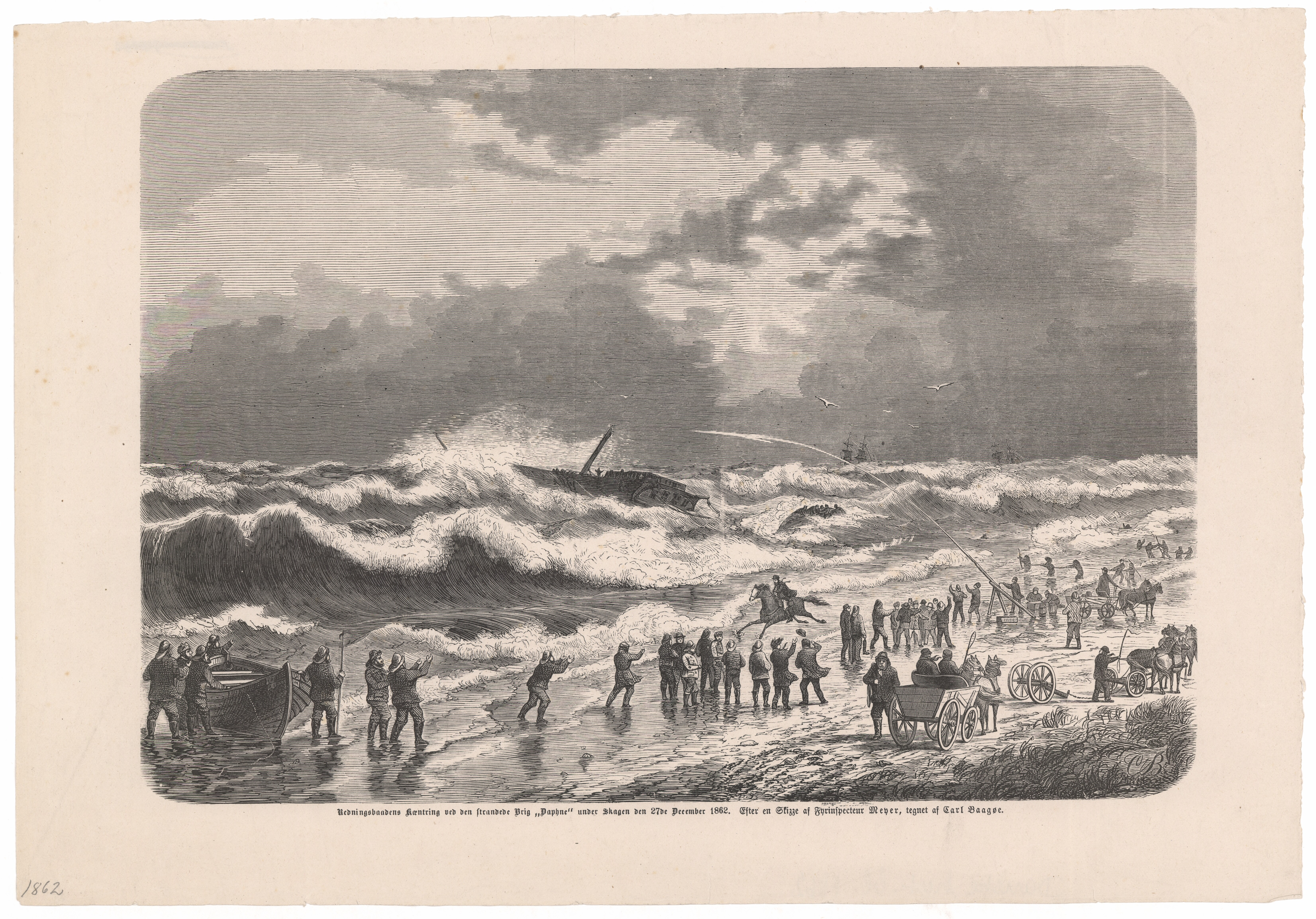
27 December: The Swedish brig Daphne at Skagen North Beach.

=== June ===
- 13 June – Rosenborg Castle Garden plays host to a party for Nordic students.

=== July ===
- 19 July – A banquet attended by Frederick VII and Carl XV of Sweden-Norway takes place in the Grand Hall of Børsen in Copenhagen.
- 25 July – The Isted Lion is inaugurated in Glensburg.

=== September ===
- 2 September – The first Aarhus and Randers railway stations oen when the new Aarhus–Randers railway line is inaugurated.

=== December ===
- 27 December – The Swedish brig Daphne is wrecked off Skagen North Beach. A rescue boat from Skagen with 11 men capsizes and only two of the men survives, leaving eight women in Skagen as widows and 25 children fatherless.

=== Undated ===
The new University of Copenhagen Zoological Museum is inaugurated.

== Culture ==
=== Art ===
- 25 July – Herman Wilhelm Bissen' Isted Lion is unveiled in Flensburg Cemetery on the 12th anniversary of the Battle of Isted.
- Undated – Wilhelm Marstrand paints the murals in Christian IV's Chapel at Roskilde Cathedral.

== Births ==
=== January–]March ===
- 13 February – Mikkel Hindhede, physician and nutritionist (died 1945)
- 17 February – Henri Konow, naval officer and governor of the Danish West Indies /died 1939)
- 22 March – Malvina Mehrn, animal rights activist (died 1960).

=== April–June ===
- 26 April – Niels Thorkild Rovsing, surgeon (died 1927)
- 10 June – Agnes Slott-Møller, painter (died 1937)

=== July–September ===
- 28 July – Fritz Syberg, painter and illustrator (died 1939)
- 30 July – Adda Ravnkilde, writer (died 1882)
- 5 August – Knud Arne Petersen, architect and artistic director (died 1943)

=== October–December ===
- 7 October – Johanne Andersen , women's rights activist (died 1025)
- 15 October – Christian Mølsted, painter (died 1930)

== Deaths ==
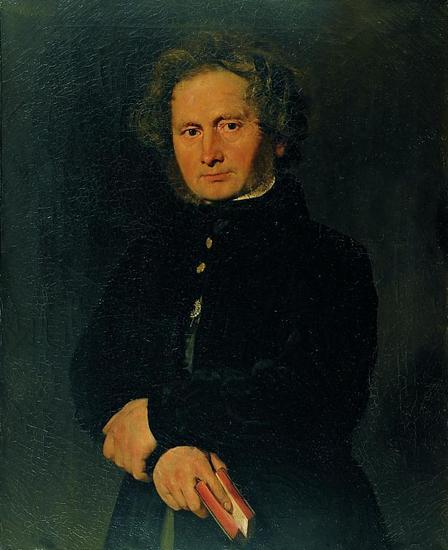
Bernhard Severin Ingemann.

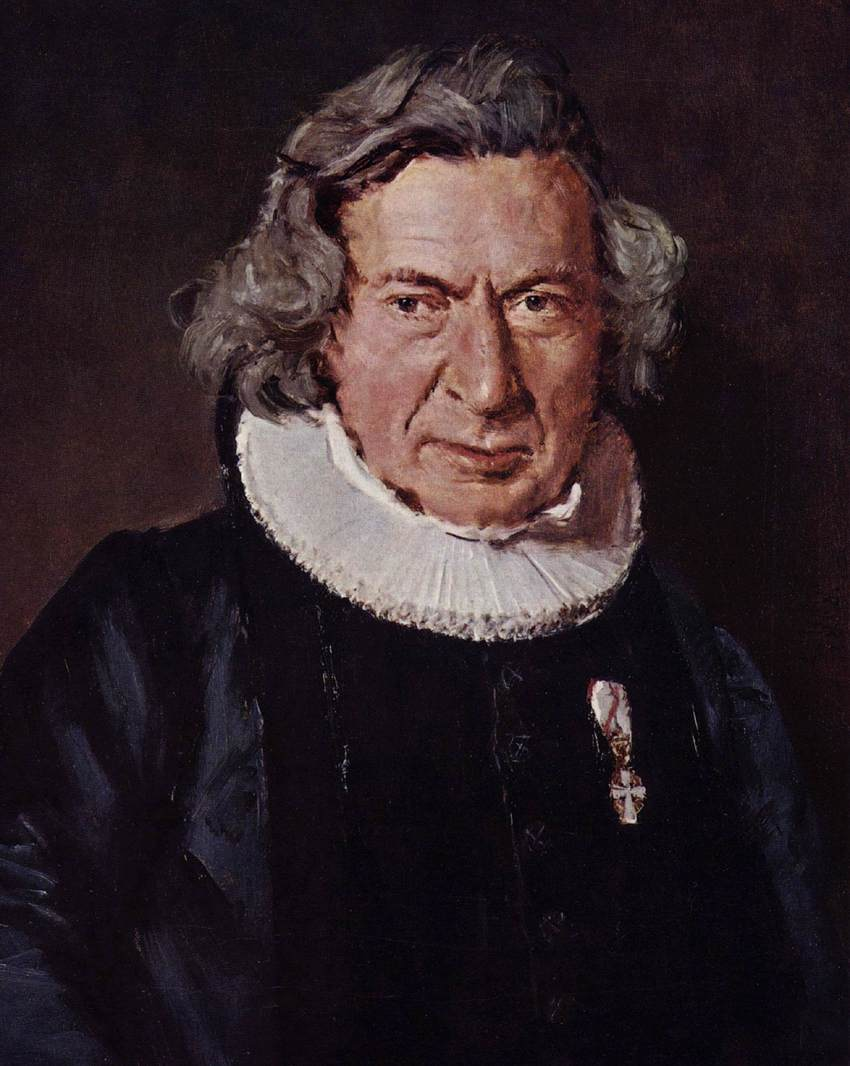
Andreas Gottlob Rudelbach.

=== January–March ===
- 4 January – Joachim Wedell-Neergaard, diplomat (born 1802)
- 24 February – Bernhard Severin Ingemann, writer (born 1789)
- 3 March – Andreas Gottlob Rudelbach, theologian (born 1792)
- 5 June – Catharine Wernicke, pianist (died 1789)

=== April–June ===
- 18 April – Frederik Sødring, painter (born 1800)

=== July–September ===
- 7 September – Joseph Owen, businessman (born 1789 in Great Britain)

=== October–December ===
- 1 November – Eleonora Zrza, opera soprano (born 1797)
- 11 November – Johan Carl Peter Prytz naval officer (born 1789)
- 23 December – Frederikke Dannemand, royal mistress (born 1792)
