= 1786 in Denmark =

- Decades: 1760s; 1770s; 1780s; 1790s; 1800s
- See also: Other events of 1786; List of years in Denmark

Events from the year 1786 in Denmark.

== Incumbents ==
- Monarch – Christian VII
- Prime minister – Andreas Peter Bernstorff

== Events ==
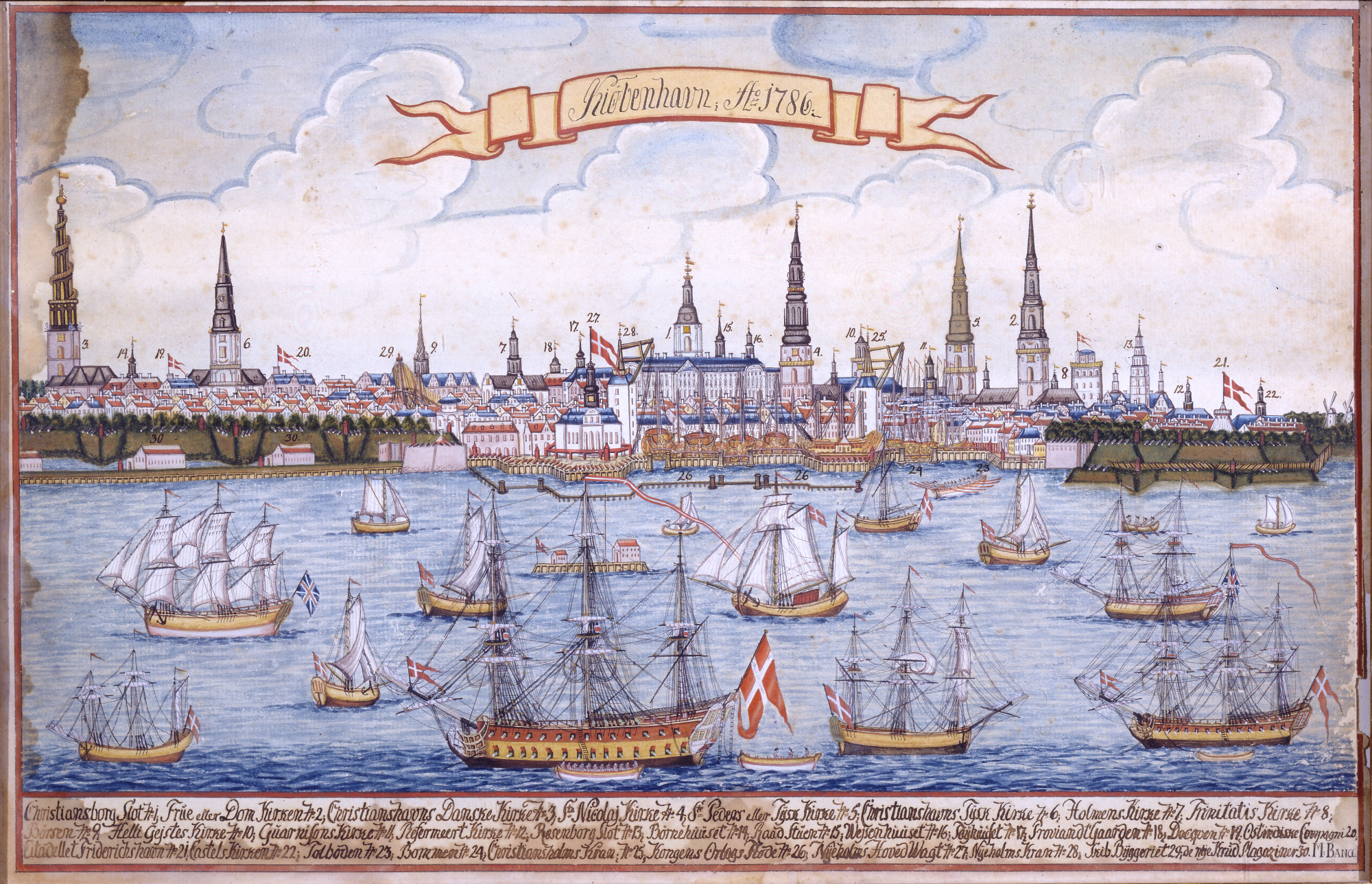
Copenhagen in 1786, gouache by M. Bang

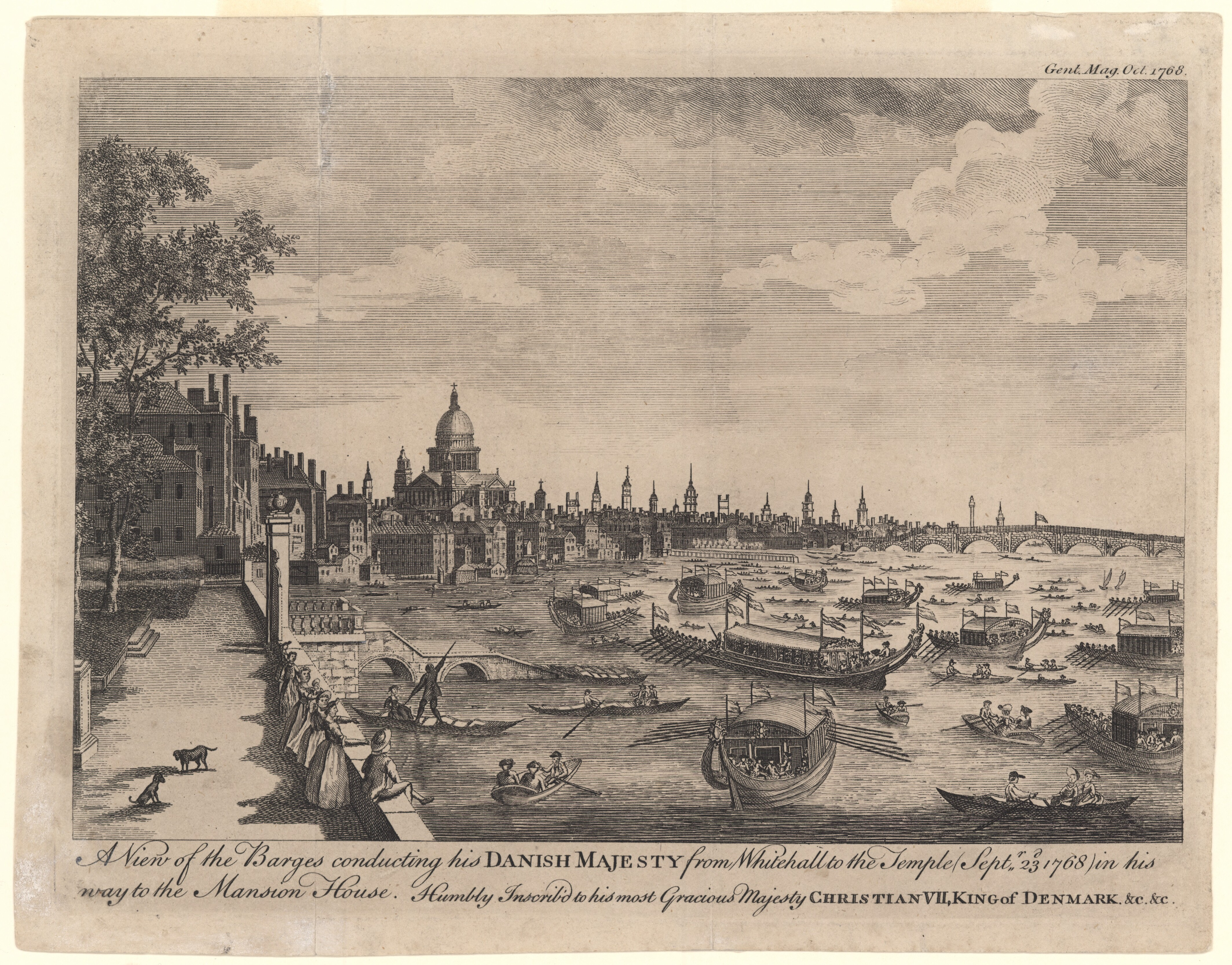
23 September: A View of the Barges conducting his Danish Majesty from Whitehall to the Temple. Illustration published in The Gentleman's Magazine, October 1768.

March

- 4 March – The school Efterslægtselskabets skole is founded in Copenhagen.

April

- 27 April – HDMS Indfødsretten is launched at Nyholm in Copenhagen.

August

- 25 August – The Great Agricultural Commission (Den Store Landbokommision) is set up with the task of rethinking the relationship between landowners and tenant farmers. It is formally abolished in 1816 but is inactive from 1802.

September

- 26 September – Christian VII visits London.

=== Unknown date ===
- The Danish–Icelandic Trade Monopoly ends.
- Foundation of Madam Lindes Institut.

== Births ==
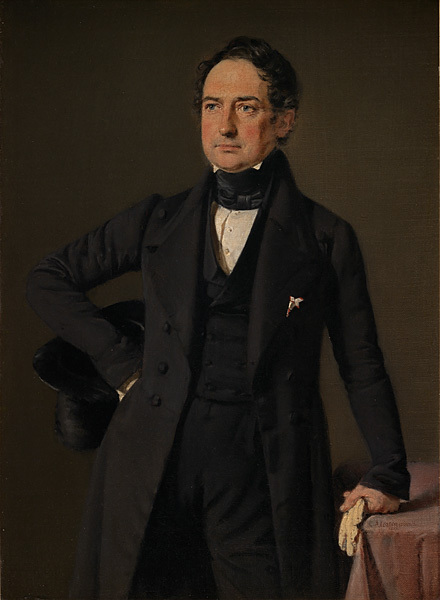
Ole Jørgen Rawert.

- 3 January – Ole Jørgen Rawert, government official and topographic painter (died 1851)
- 8 January – Christen Niemann Rosenkilde, actor (died 1861)
- 28 January – Nathaniel Wallich, botanist (died 1854)
- 15 September – Frederik Treschow, supreme court attorney, politician, landowner and philanthropist (died 1869)
- 18 September – Christian VIII, King of Denmark (died 1848)
- 6 October – Christian Steen, bookseller and publisher (died 1861)
- 23 October – Lewin Jürgen Rohde, naval officer and harbour master (died 1857)
- 14 November – Simon Aron Eiberchutz, businessman and philanthropist (died 1856)
- 13 December – Daniel Bentley, civil servant (died 1869)

== Deaths ==
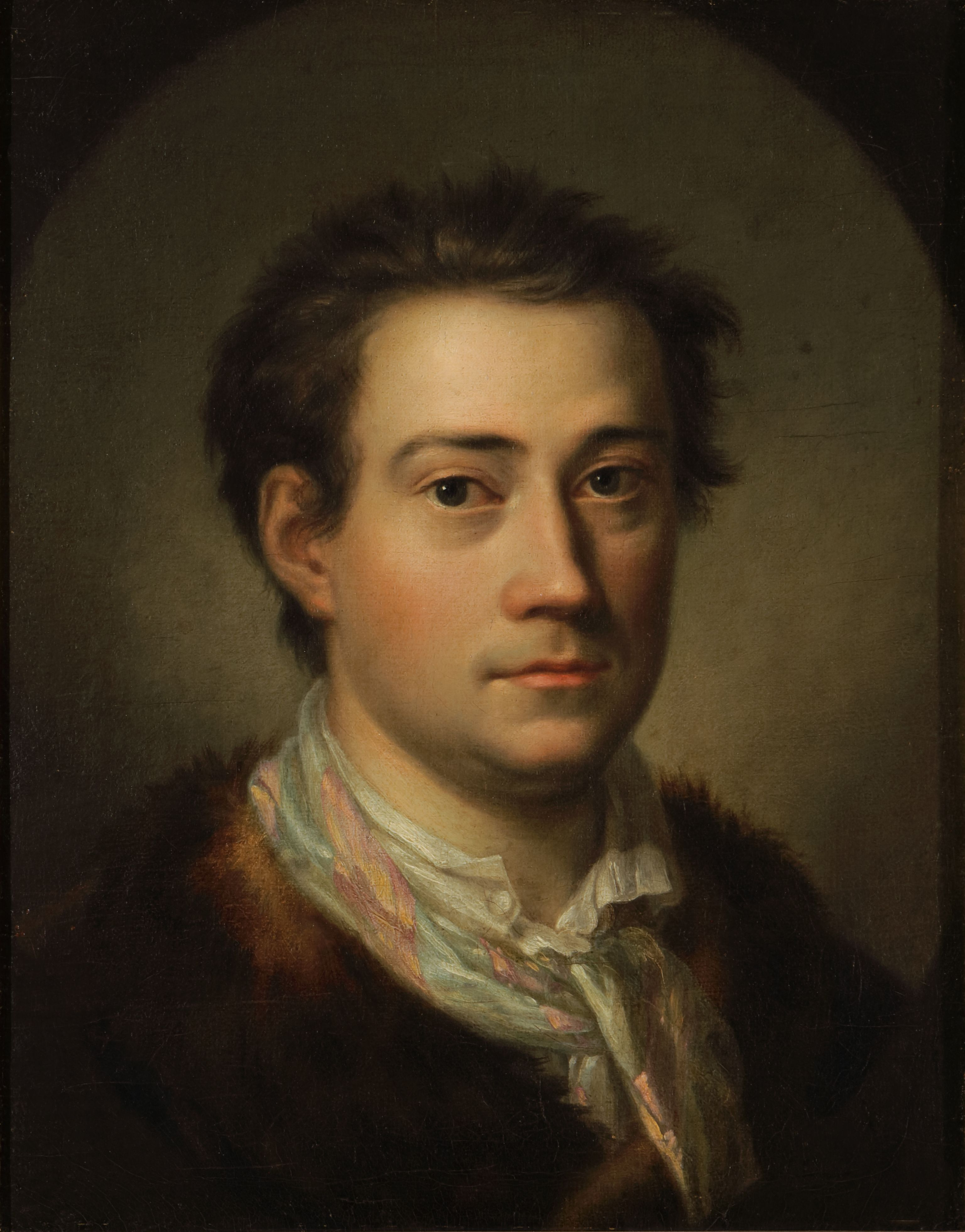
Johan Mandelberg.

- 8 January – Johan Mandelberg, painter (born 1730)
- 5 March– Jørgen Skeel, statesman and landowner (born 1718)
- 19 April – Cecilie Christine Schøller, socialite (born 1720).
- 29 December – Johan Herman Wessel, poet, playwright (born 1742)

=== Unknown date ===
- Johan Bernhardt Schottmann, master builder (born 1734 in Saxony)
