= 1789 in Denmark =

- Decades: 1760s; 1770s; 1780s; 1790s; 1800s
- See also: Other events of 1789; List of years in Denmark

Events from the year 1789 in Denmark.

== Incumbents ==
- Monarch – Christian VII
- Prime minister – Andreas Peter Bernstorff

== Events ==
- 9 July – The Theater War, which began the previous year, formally ends.

=== Undated ===
- Andreas Hjorth founds what will later become known as Emil Hjorth & Sønner.

== Births ==
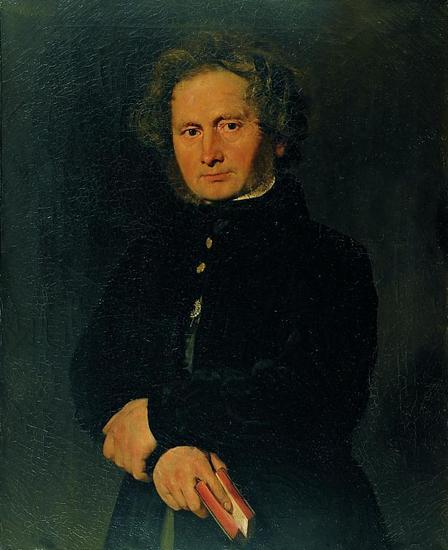
Bernhard Severin Ingemann.

- 7 February – Joakim Frederik Schouw, lawyer, botanist and politician (died 1852)
- 14 April – Catharine Wernicke, pianist (died 1862)
- 25 May – Peter Johan Alexei Conradt-Eberlin, Supreme Court justice (died 1847)
- 28 May – Bernhard Severin Ingemann, writer (died 1862)
- 16 August – Johan Carl Peter Prytz naval officer (died 1862)
- 15 October – William Christopher Zeise, chemist (died 1847)
- 30 October – Princess Louise Charlotte, princess of Denmark (died 1864)
- 26 December – Cosmus Bræstrup, chief of police (died 1870)

== Deaths ==
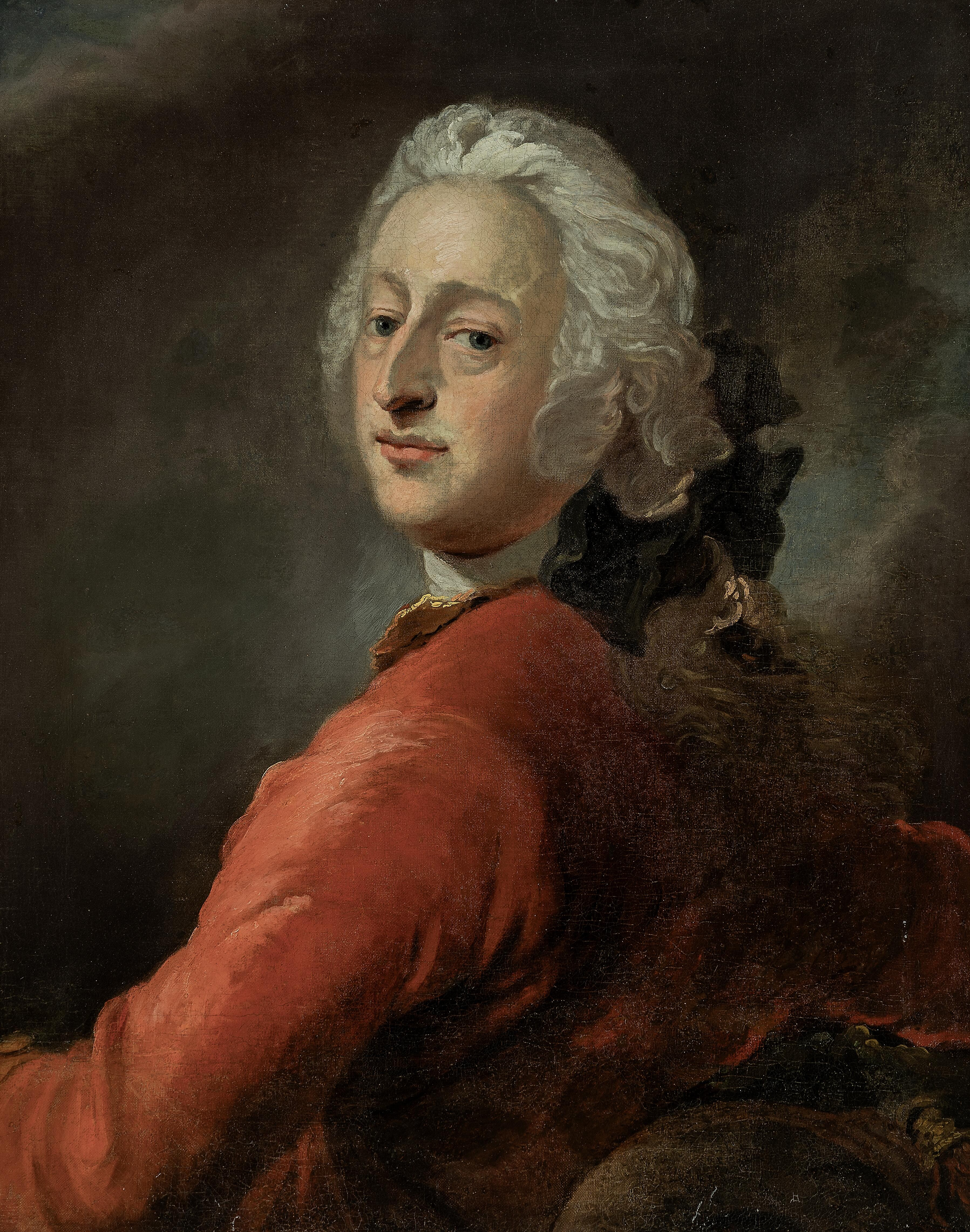
Simon Hooglant.

- 27 September – Oluf Lundt Bang, lawyer and judge (born 1731)
- 19 December – Simon Hooglant, admiral (born 1712)
