= Christian Steen =

Christian Steen may refer to:

- Christian Steen (publisher), Danish publisher
- Christian Steen (footballer), Norwegian footballer
