= 1788 in Denmark =

- Decades: 1760s; 1770s; 1780s; 1790s; 1800s
- See also: Other events of 1788; List of years in Denmark

Events from the year 1788 in Denmark.

== Incumbents ==
- Monarch – Christian VII
- Prime minister – Andreas Peter Bernstorff

== Events ==
September

- 24 September – The Theater War begins, when Denmark-Norway launches an attack on Sweden at Bohuslän as a diversion to support Russia, an ally of Denmark-Norway, who had in turn been attacked by Sweden in Gustav III's Russian War.

October

- 28 October – Lorentz Petersen's wine company is founded in Copenhagen.

=== Undated ===
- Eriksholm Manor is completed to designs by Caspar Frederik Harsdorff.

== Births ==
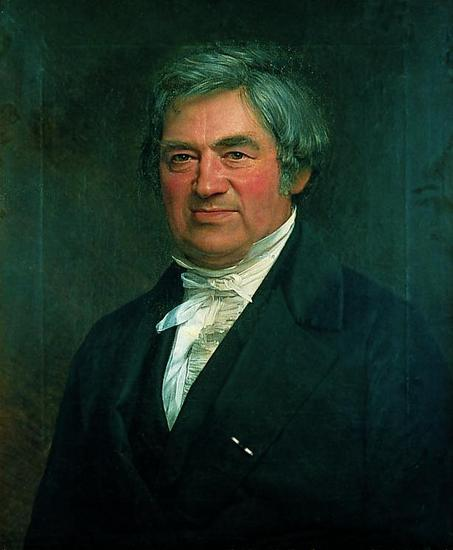
Christian Jürgensen Thomsen.

- 18 February - Princess Juliane Sophie of Denmark, princess of Denmark (died 1850)
- 26 July – Ole Bang, medical doctor (died 1877)
- 27 August – Frederik von Lowzow, civil servant and judge (died 1859)
- 3 September
  - Hans Puggaard, businessman (born 1866)
  - – Henrik Gamst, businessman, politician and landowner (died 1751)
- 28 September - Gustav Friedrich Hetsch, architect (died 1864)
- 29 December – Christian Jürgensen Thomsen, archaeologist and arts administrator (died 1865)
- undated - Anna Salmberg, educator (died 1868)

== Deaths ==
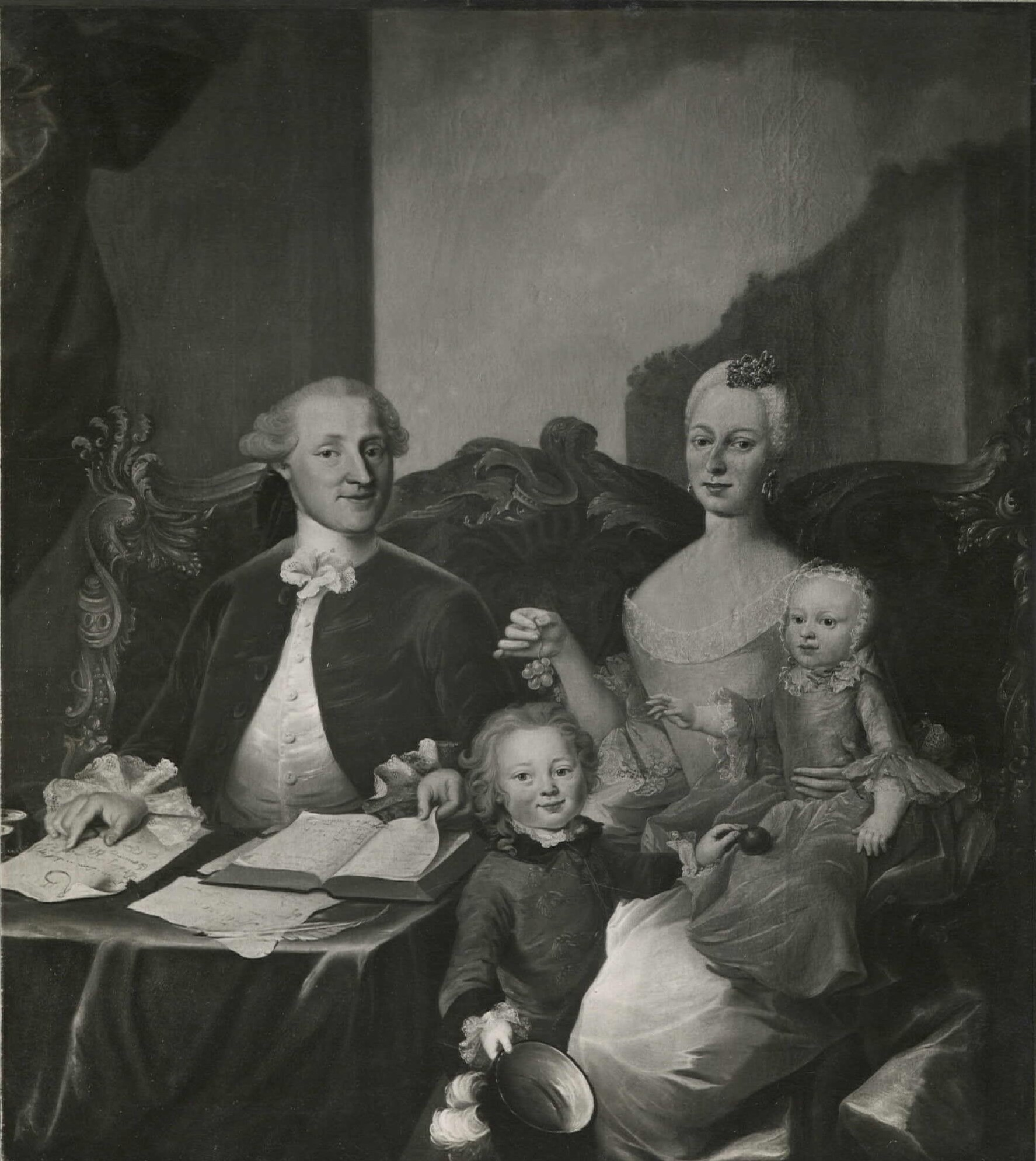
Hans Christopher Hersleb.

- 22 February – Hans Christopher Hersleb, burgermaster of Copenhagen (born 1722))
- 22 April – Jens Bruun de Neergaard, judge and landowner (born 1742)
- 17 May – Dorothea Biehl, playwright, translator (born 1731)
- 21 June – Mathias Lunding, mayor of Copenhagen and director of the Danish Asiatic Company (born 1728)
