= Christen Worm =

Danish theologian

- Bishop of Zealand
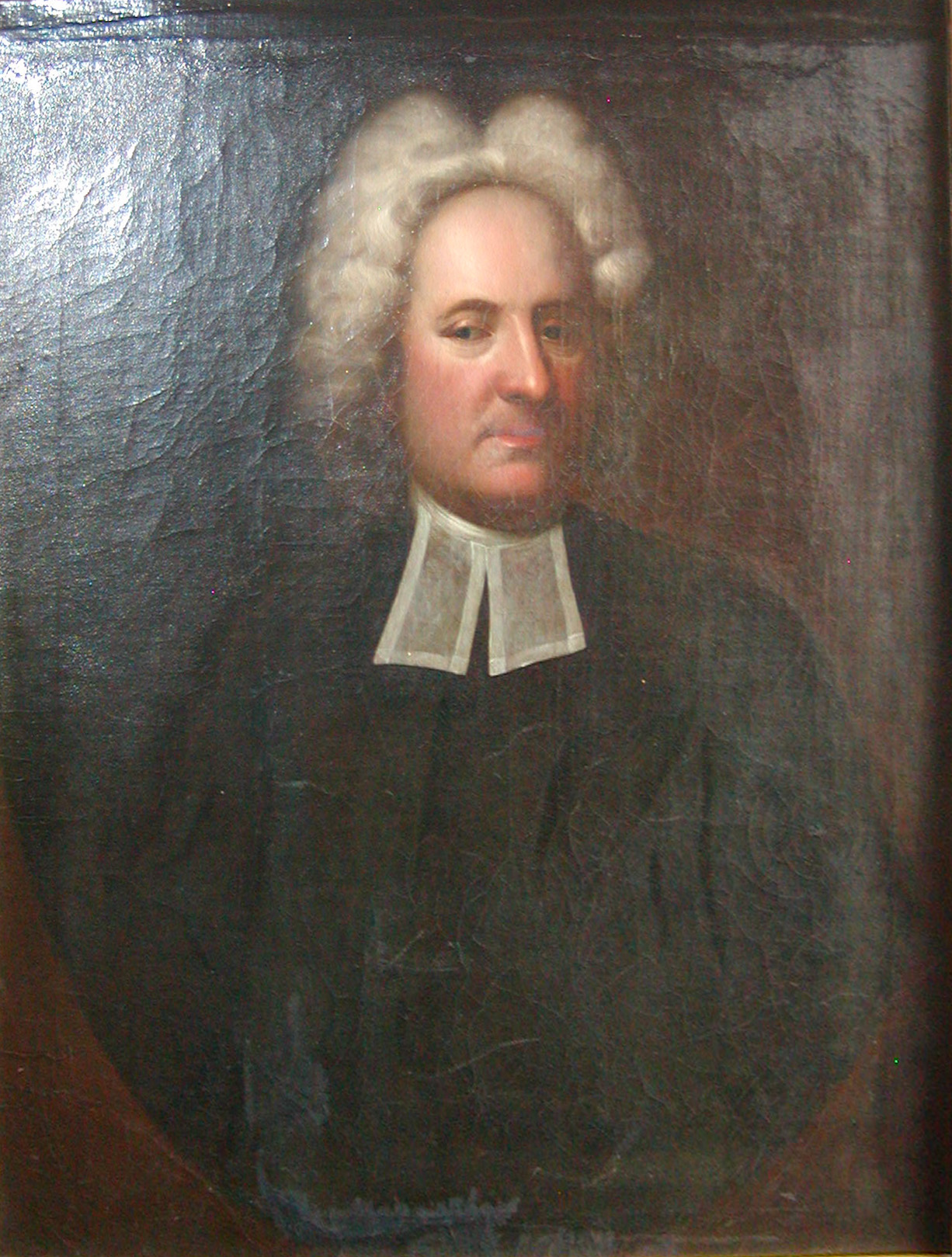
- Portrait by G. von Lude, c. 1700
- Church: Church of Denmark
- Predecessor: Henrik Bornemann
- Successor: Peder Hersleb

Personal details
- Born: Christen Willumsen Worm; 10 June 1672; Copenhagen, Denmark
- Died: 9 October 1737 (aged 65); Copenhagen, Denmark
- Buried: Church of Our Lady, Copenhagen
- Parents: Willum Worm

Christen Willumsen Worm (10 June 1672 – 9 October 1737) was a Danish theologian and Bishop of the Diocese of Zealand from 1711 until his death. Worm began his career as a scholar and a priest. Over the course of his tenure as bishop, his authority as primus inter pares was repeatedly challenged.

== Personal life ==
Worm was born on 10 June 1672, in Copenhagen to Else Christensdatter Luxdorph (1647–1722). His father, Willum Worm, was a prominent justice and historiographer royal. His sister, Susanne Malene Worm, was born in 1680 and died in 1735. In 1699 he married Christine Tistorph, the daughter of Mikkel Henriksen Tistorph (1628–1701) who was his predecessor as priest at St. Nicholas Church.

During the Copenhagen Fire of 1728 the bishop's manor burnt down along with the diocese's archive and Worm's personal library collection which included the collection from his grandfather, Ole Worm. Worm died on 9 October 1737 in Copenhagen. He is buried at the Church of Our Lady.

== Education ==
Worm entered the Metropolitanskolen in Copenhagen in 1686, from which he graduated in 1689. In 1692 he passed his theological examination, after which he became an assistant teacher. Between 1692 and 1694 he produced several theses through the University of Copenhagen. In particular, his thesis "De corruptis Antiquitatum Hebræarum apud Tacitum et Martialem Vestigiis libri II" was republished in the second volume of Thesaurus Antiquitatum Sacrarum, etc. in Venice, 1744, following his death.

As a continuation of his studies, Worm traveled abroad. In October 1696 he stayed in Leiden but soon traveled on to England where he studied at Oxford. While studying at Oxford he had borrowed a manuscript, which he neglected to return before leaving in 1697 for Wolfenbüttel. There, one of the archivists asked to borrow the manuscript from Worm. It was returned to Oxford shortly thereafter, though rumor spread that Worm had intentionally stolen the document for monetary gain, an accusation which came forth in a 1737 publication.

== Early career ==
Worm returned to Denmark from his studies abroad in 1698, but did not receive the professorship he had been previously promised at the University of Copenhagen. In 1699, he instead took up a position at St. Nicholas Church as an assistant priest to Mikkel Henriksen Tistorph, whom he succeeded as parish priest in 1701. In 1707, he became the priest at the Church of Our Lady in addition to his roles as provost of the diocese.

During this time, Worm concerned himself with the improvement of the public school system. He established a school at St. Nicolas Church in 1706, and then a second within the parish of the Church of Our Lady in 1707. At long last, he was granted a position as professor of theology at the University of Copenhagen in 1710. The next year, Worm was appointed as the bishop of Zealand.

== Bishop of Zealand ==
As a member of the Copenhagen Poverty Commission (Danish: Københavns Fattigkommission), Worm defended their act which banned alms in ordinance with an older law. This brought him into conflict with the diocesan provst Jacob Lodberg, who preached against the law in defiance of Worm's authority as Bishop. Worm complained to the King when the argument fell in Lodberg's favor, and unwisely said that he was unable to enforce his rule as priest. This incurred sharp rebuke from the king, who replied:

Regere, den Umage have vi ogsaa paataget os selv.
"To rule, that trouble have we also taken upon ourselves."

—King Frederick IV

The establishment of the College of Missions in 1714 greatly diminished his influence as bishop, as the college made various recommendations on ecclesiastical affairs which had previously fallen under the jurisdiction of bishops. Worm's strongest opponent became the theological professor Hans Bartholin, who inserted himself as an authority within Zealand's bishopric.

Worm opposed Bartholin and his 1724 commission, which was ordered by Frederik IV to investigate claims of embezzlement among various high clergy members. Queen Anna Sophie was also interested in the proceedings of the commission and was particularly unsympathetic towards Worm, as he had established himself as a sympathizer of the former queen consort, Louise of Mecklenburg-Güstrow, when he delivered her eulogy in 1721. His eulogies to both King Frederik IV and Louise were not allowed to be published until after the death of their son, King Christian VI, in 1747. The resulting publication was then released in an edited and censored form by contemporary critics. In 1731 he crowned Frederik IV's successor, Christian VI, along with his wife Sophie Magdalene. Under their reign, Worm had even less authority as bishop than he had under Frederik IV. Instead, he asserted his influence as a member of several commissions.
