= Ludvig Harboe =

Danish theologian

Right Reverend Ludvig Harboe
- Bishop of Zealand; Bishop of Trondhjem
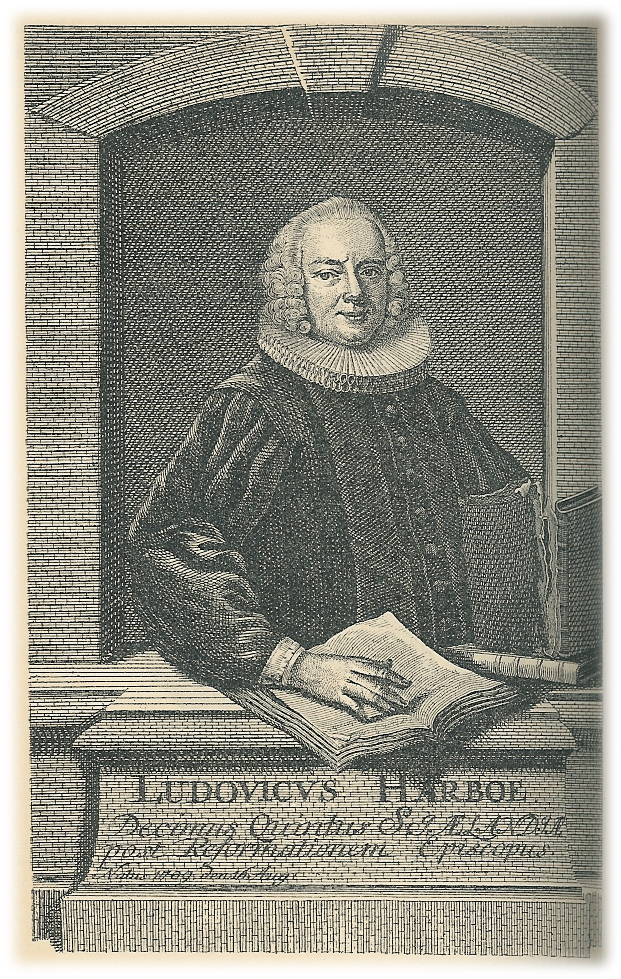
- Portrait of Ludvig Harboe
- Church: Church of Denmark
- Diocese: Diocese of Zealand
- In office: 1757–1783
- Predecessor: Peder Hersleb
- Successor: Nicolai Edinger Balle

Personal details
- Born: 16 August 1709 Broager, Denmark
- Died: 15 June 1783 (aged 73) Denmark
- Denomination: Christian
- Occupation: Priest/Bishop

Ludvig Harboe (16 August 1709 – 15 June 1783) was a Danish theologian and bishop of the Diocese of Zealand from 1757 until his death.

== Early life and education ==
Harboe was born at Broager Peninsula in Sønderborg, Denmark. He was mostly educated in Germany. He attended gymnasium in Hamburg, where he stayed for two years. Then he studied at the universities of Rostock, Wittenberg and Jena, returning home to Broager in 1732.

== Career ==
In 1738, Harboe was a priest at Garnisonskirken, and in 1739 became a priest at Kastelskirken, both churches in Copenhagen.

Harboe was sent to Iceland in 1741 to inspect the state of the church there on behalf of the Church of Denmark. He initiated some reforms, and while there (in 1743) was appointed to the post of bishop of the Diocese of Trondhjem. After returning to Copenhagen in 1745, he was consecrated as bishop and soon left for Trondheim, the seat of his new diocese. He arrived in Trondheim on 1 July 1746 and served there for two more years before leaving the post and returning to Copenhagen.

After returning to Copenhagen in 1748, Harboe married Frederikke Louise Hersleb (1720-1780), the daughter of Peder Hersleb, bishop of the Diocese of Zealand. He worked with his new father-in-law in Denmark, and when Hersleb died in 1757, Harboe was appointed to replace him. He served there until his death in 1783.

== Personal life ==
Harboe was married to Frederikke Louise Pedersdatter Hersleb (1720–1780), daughter of Peder Hersleb and Bolette (Bodild) Hiort (1690–1767). Three of their five children survived to adulthood. Their eldest daughter Bolette Marie Harboe (Hersleb) (1750–1800) was married to the landowner Johan Frederik Lindencrone, til Gjorsl. The daughter Johanne Frederikke Harboe (1756–1802) was married to bishop Nicolai Edinger Sørensen Balle (1744–1816). The third daughter Charlotte Sophie Atche (Hersleb) (1758–1793) was married to Peter Atche (1746–1792).

Church of Norway titles
Preceded by Eiler Hagerup	Bishop of Trondhjem; 1743–1748	Succeeded by Frederik Nannestad
Preceded by Peder Hersleb	Bishop of Sjælland; 1757–1783	Succeeded by Nicolai Edinger Balle
