= Peder Hersleb =

Norwegian-Danish clergyman (1689–1757)

Bishop Peder Hersleb
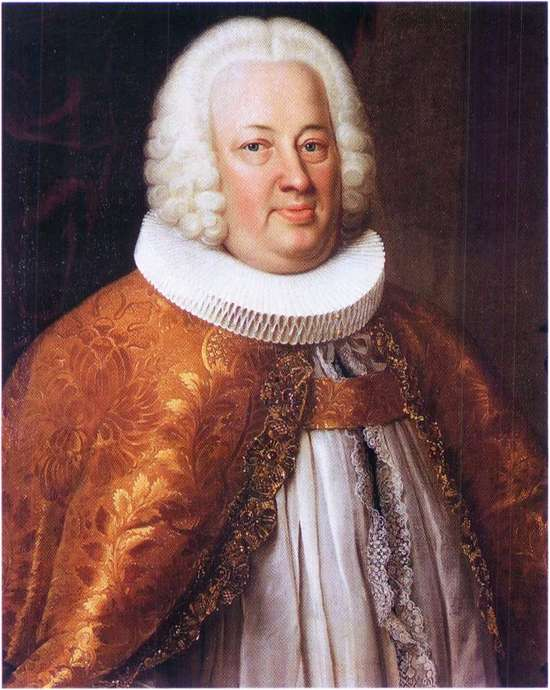
- 1757 portrait of Hersleb
- Predecessor: Christen Worm
- Successor: Ludvig Harboe

Personal details
- Born: 25 March 1689 Steinkjer, Norway
- Died: 4 April 1757 (aged 68) Copenhagen, Denmark
- Denomination: Lutheran
- Parents: Christopher Hersleb; Sophie Borch
- Children: Hans Christopher Hersleb
- Occupation: Priest
- Education: University of Copenhagen

Peder Hersleb (25 March 1689 – 4 April 1757) was a Norwegian-Danish clergyman who served as Bishop of Christiania from 1731 to 1737 and Bishop of Zealand from 1737 to 1757.

== Early life and education ==
Hersleb was born at Steinkjer in Nordre Trondheim county, Norway, the son of Christopher Hersleb and Sophie Borch. He became a student at Trondheim in 1703 and received a bachelor's degree in 1704, taking his theological examination in 1707. In 1713, he was awarded a master's degree from the University of Copenhagen.

== Career ==
In 1714, Hersleb was appointed a military chaplain. In 1718 he was called to minister at Gunslev on the island of Falster, but the same year he was appointed priest at Frederiksborg Castle and vicar in Hillerod and Herløv. He instegated a reorganization of Hillerød's Poor Authority and the establishment in the town. After proposing a new school in Herkøv, he was also charged with creating a plan for Frederick IV's cavalry schools.

In 1725, he moved to Copenhagen as priest in the Danish royal court. In 1727, he was a member of the Mission College and co-director of Waisenhuset Orphanage School which he inaugurated in spring 1728. He served as Bishop of the Diocese of Oslo from 1731 to 1737. He published several collections of sermons.

In 1737, he was elected Bishop of Diocese of Zeaæand. He held this post until his death.

== Personal life and legacy ==
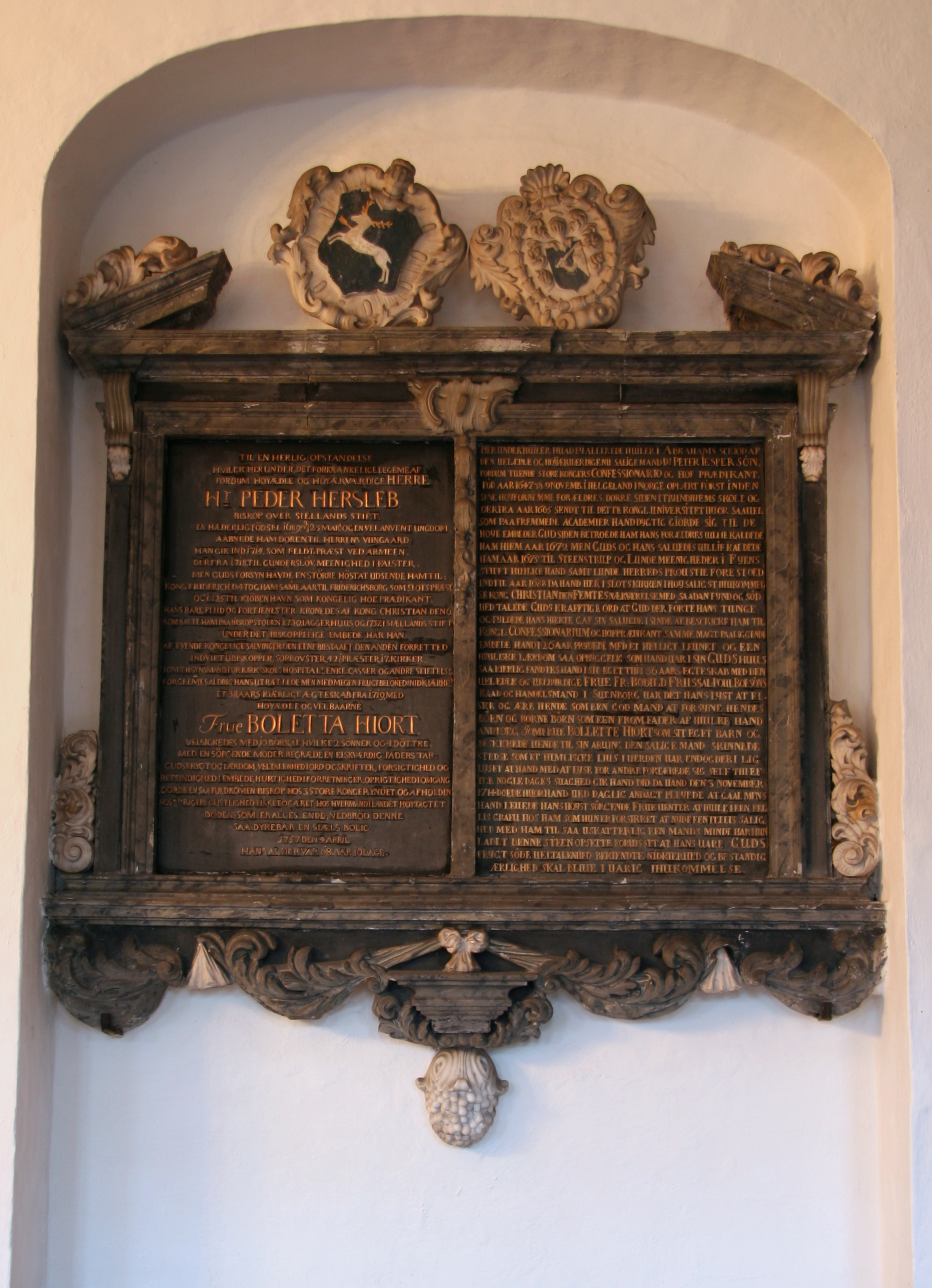
Epitaph to Herslev in Holmen Church, Copenhagen.

On 25 October 1719, in Christiansborg Chapel, Hersleb married Bodild (Bolette) Hiort (1690–1767). She was a daughter of Lutheran minister Hans Hiort (1664–1730) and Ellen Boesen (c. 1664–1747) and foster daughter of konfessionarius Peder Jespersen (1647–1714). Their eldest daughter, Frederikke Louise Hersleb (1720-1780), married Ludvig Harboe, who worked with him in the diocese. Their son Hans Christopher Herslev served as burgermaster in Copenhagen. Their daughter Petronelle Helene Hersleb (1724–1778) was married to government official Andreas Jacobsen Graah (1701–1780) and the mother of Supreme Court justice Peter Hersleb Graae (father of Wilhelm August Graah). Their daughter Bolette Sophie Hersleb (1728–1765) was married to the government official Peter Jensen Aagaard and the mother of Supreme Court attorney Peter Herslev Aagaard. Their son Peder Hersleb (1730–1765) was vicar of Nykøbing and Rødby.

Hersleb died in 1757 and was buried in the graveyard of Holmen Church. Inside the church is an epitaph to Herslev. Ludvig Harboe was appointed to replace him as Bishop.

Church of Norway titles
Preceded by Bartholomæus Deichman	Bishop of Oslo; 1731–1737	Succeeded by Niels Dorph
Preceded by Christen Worm	Bishop of Sjælland; 1737–1757	Succeeded by Ludvig Harboe
