= Julius Friedlænder =

Danish genre painter

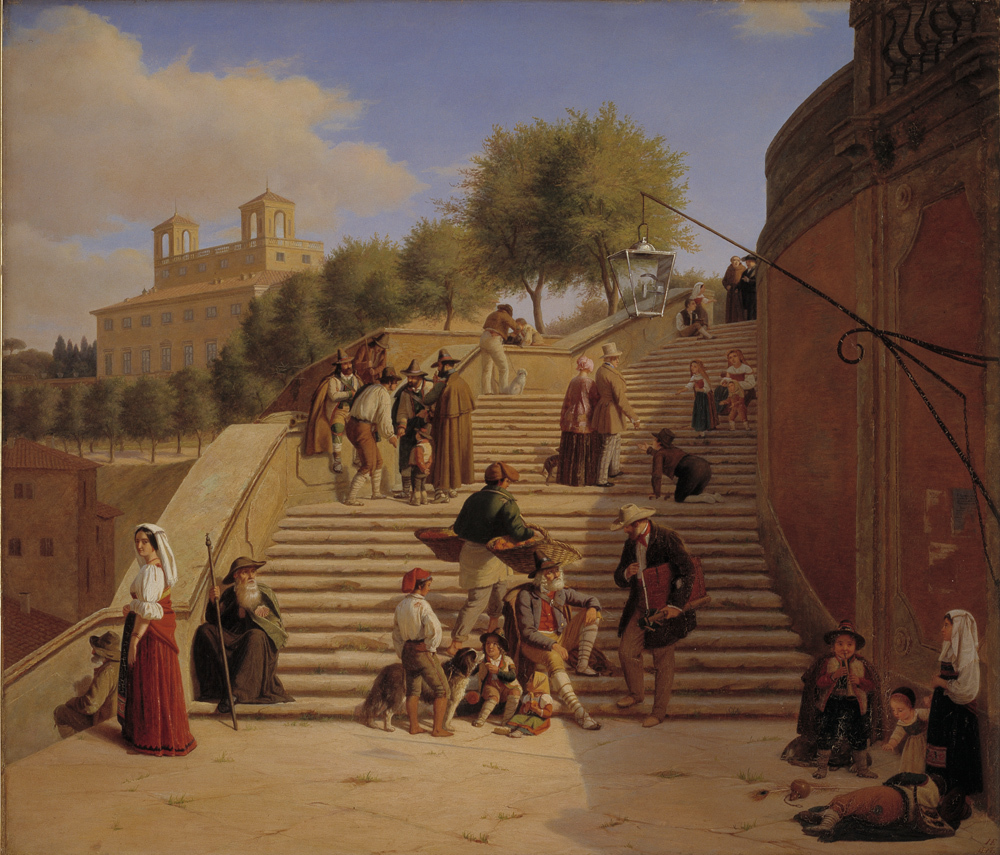
Upper Flights of the Spanish Steps in Rome

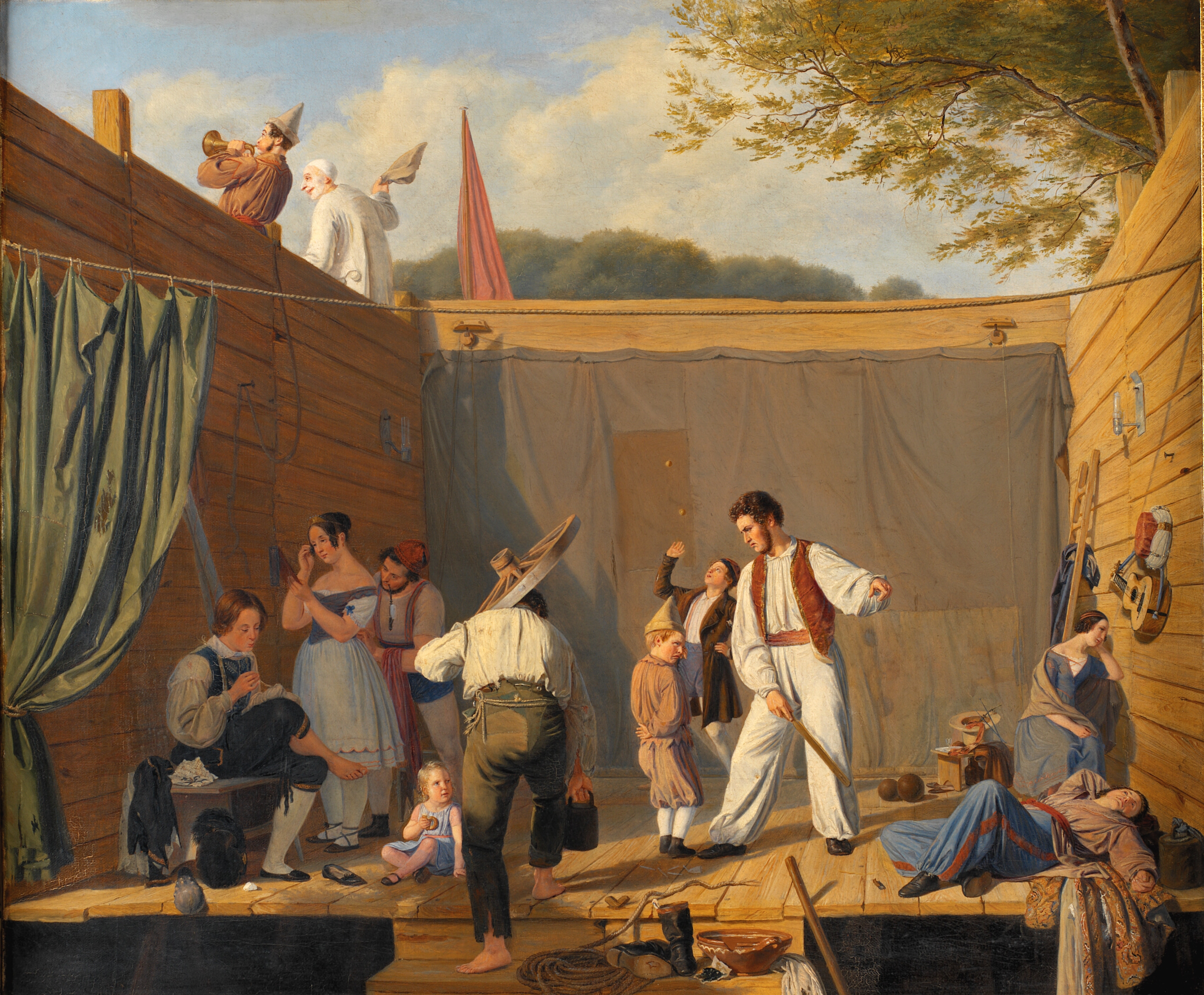
Group of Tightrope Walkers just before a Performance

Julius Friedlænder (29 January 1810 – 18 September 1861) was a Danish genre painter.

== Biography ==
Friedlænder was born at Copenhagen, Denmark. He was the son of Marcus Friedländer and Rebecca Heymann. He entered the Academy in 1824, afterwards studying under Johan Ludwig Lund (1777–1867).

In 1842, he was awarded a travel scholarship from the Academy. In 1843-44 he visited Paris and Italy, whence he derived additional subjects for his art. Still later he took to depicting military and naval life.

He exhibited at the Charlottenborg Spring Exhibition periodically between 1812-1861. He died in Copenhagen during 1861.

Among his pictures are:

- Group of Tightrope Walkers just before a Performance. (Copenhagen Gallery. 1840-1841 )
- Upper Flights of the Spanish Steps in Rome (Copenhagen Gallery. 1847)
