= Johanne Andersen (women's rights activist) =

Danish women's rights activist

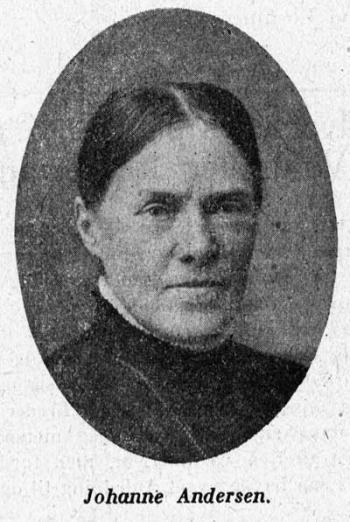
Johanne Andersen (1918)

Johanne Kirstine Andersen née Christiansen (1862–1925) was a Danish women's rights activist. In 1908, she co-founded and subsequently headed the Balslev-Ejby branch of the Danish Women's Society in the north-west of the island of Funen. Two years later, she became a member of the national organization's joint management board, serving as deputy chair from 1919 until her retirement in 1922. She was particularly active in promoting the interests of women from rural communities and encouraging women's involvement in household planning and in running school canteens. Politically, after Danish women obtained voting rights in 1915, she joined the Venstre party but did not succeed in being elected to the Folketing in the 1918 elections.

== Biography ==
Born on 7 October 1862 in Balslev Parish in the northwestern Funen, Johanne Kirstine Andersen was the daughter of the farmer Hans Christiansen (1829–1902) and his wife Maren née Jørgensdatter (1827–1872). In May 1897, she married the farmer Anders Jensen Andersen (1858–1936), with whom she had two children: Sigurd (1898) and Ingefred (1899).

While at the Vældegarrd Women's School in Gentofte, thanks to a talk by Astrid Stampe she became interested in the women's movement. After working for a number of years as a teacher, in 1897 she married and returned to her farm in Balslev. She received her husband's support and encouragement to serve the local community where she opened an orphanage, served in the school commission and the farmers' association.

In 1908, Andersen co-founded the Balslev-Ejby branch of the Danish Women's Society. As chair, she promoted the fight for women's suffrage and the participation of women in the municipal elections in 1909. From 1910, she served on the central board of the Women's Society, becoming deputy chairman until her retirement in 1922. Representing the Venstre party, she took part in the national elections in 1918 but was elected only to the Landsting.

Johanne Andersen died in her Balslev home on 10 October 1925.
