= Emil Hjorth & Sønner =

- Type: Private
- Industry: Musical instruments
- Founded: 1789
- Founder: Andreas Hjorth
- Headquarters: Copenhagen, Denmark
- Website: Official website

Emil Hjorth & Sønner was a family-owned manufacturer of bowed string instruments founded in 1789 in Copenhagen, Denmark. It closed in December 2016.

== History ==
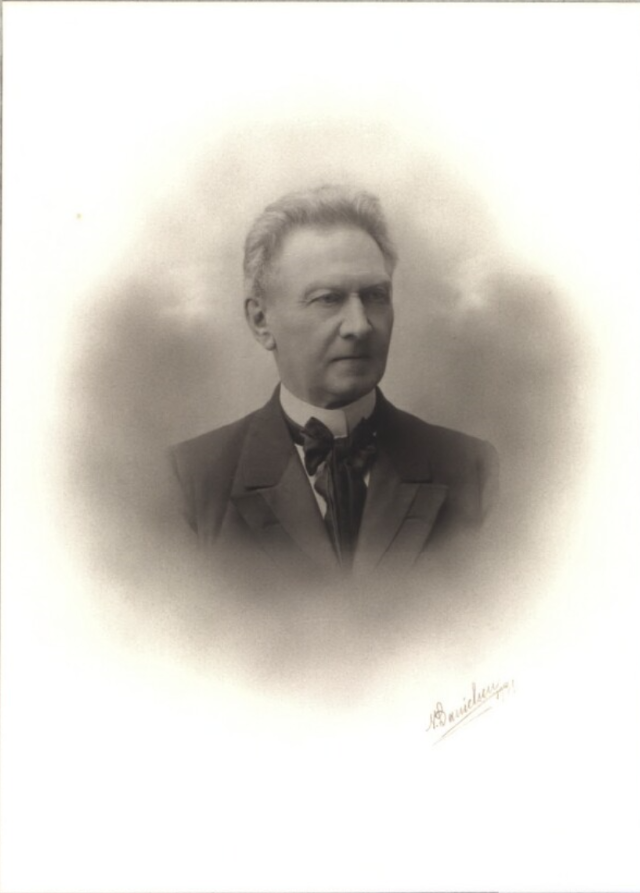
Emil Hjorth

The company was founded by Andreas Hansen Hjorth (1749–1834) in 1789. He became sole supplier to the Royal Danish Orchestra.

Johannes Hjorth (1809–1900) took over the company after his father's death in 1834.

Johannes Hjorth's son, Emil Hjorth (1840–1920), was educated in his father's workshop. He then travelled to Vienna where he worked for Gabriel Lembock in 1863–1864 before continuing to Paris where he worked for Bernardel père. He was strongly influenced by the French school of violin building. Back in Copenhagen, he became a partner in 1865 and its sole owner in 1880.

Emil Hjorth's eldest son, Otto Hjorth (born 1877) was an apprentice in his father's workshop from 1892 and worked for Georges Cunault in Paris in 1900–1902. His younger brother, Knud Hjorth (born 1880), was an apprentice in his father's workshop from 1896 and worked for Ernest Kessler in 1904–1905.

The name of the company was changed to Emil Hjorth & Sønner when Otto and Knud Hjorth became partners in 1905. Their father retired from the company the following year. In 1950, Otto and Knud Hjorth were co-founders of the International Association of Violin and Bow Makers.

Knud Hjorth's son, Arne Hjorth (born 1910), was an apprentice in the company from 1926. He worked for Charles Enel in Paris in 1934–1935. He became a partner in the family business in 1949 and its sole owner in 1052.

Arne Hjorth's son, Mads Hjorth (born 1947), was an apprentice in Emil Hjorth & Sønner from 1962. He continued his education in the company Paul Hilaire in Mirecourt, France, in 1966–1968, training under Jean Eulry. He then continued to Paris where he trained under Étienne Vatelot in 1968–1969. He returned to Emil Hjorth & Sønner in 1970, became a partner in 1972 and its sole owner in 1985. The company closed in December 2016.

== Location ==
The company was for many years based at Frederiksberggade 12. It later relocated to Frederiksholms Kanal 12.
