= Hans Christopher Hersleb =

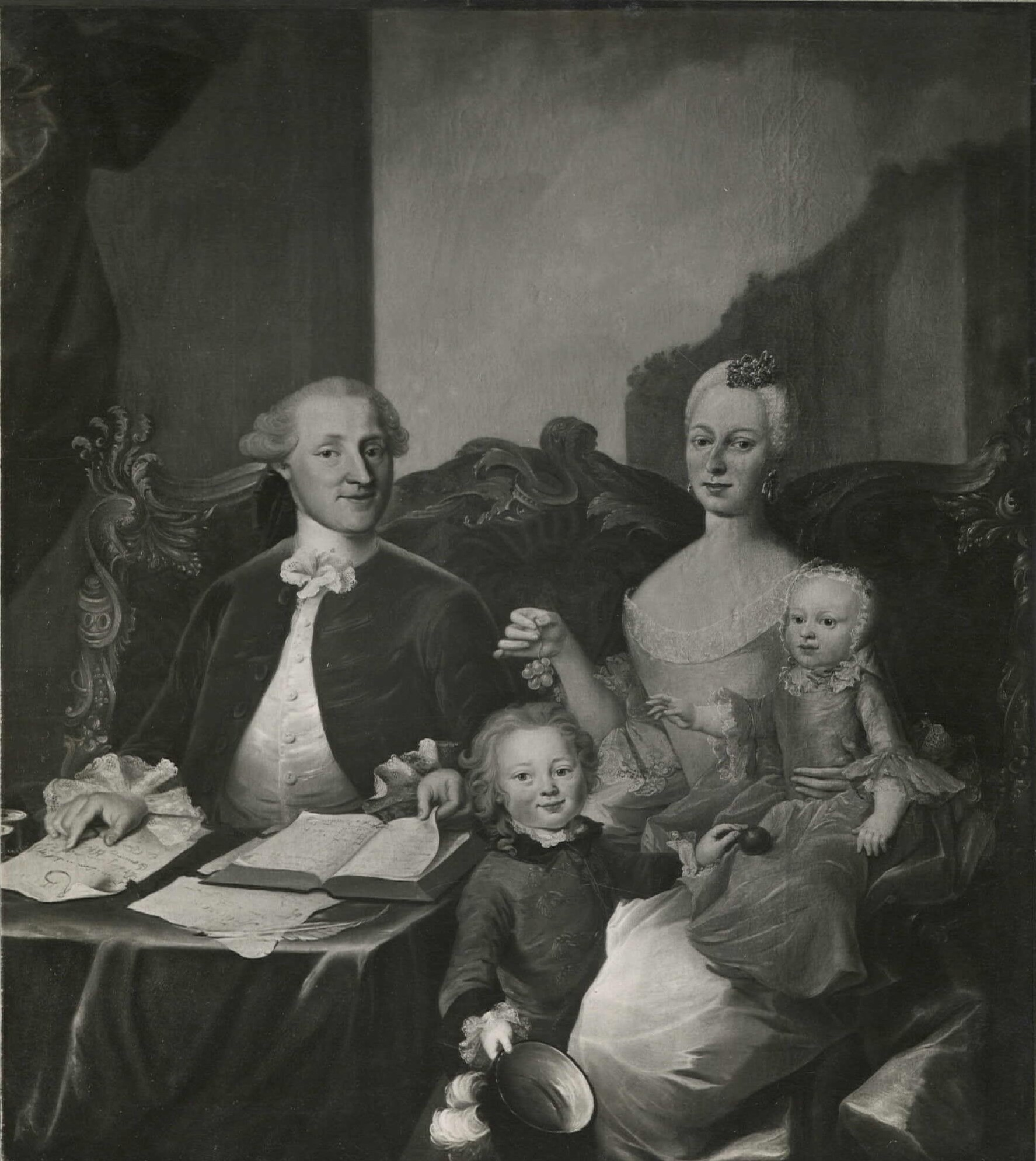
Hans Christopher Herslev with family painted by Andreas Brünniche-

Hans Christopher Hersleb (11 June 1722 – 22 February 1788) was a Danish juris who served as burgermaster in Copenhagen from 1754 to 1788, with a short interruption in 1771–1772 when Johann Friedrich Struensee had Copenhagen's Magistracy removed.

== Early life and education ==
Hersleb was born on 11 June 1722 in Copenhagen, the son of Peder Hersleb (1689–1757) and Bodild Hiort (1690–1767). His father served as priest at Frederiksborg Castle and vicar in Hillerod and Roskilde and from 1725 as priest at the royal court in Copenhagen. Hersleb matriculated from the Pædagogiet in Halle in 1730. In 1740, he enrolled at the University of Copenhagen. He studied theology and later law.

He had one brother and four sisters, of whom one sister did not survive childhood. The brother Peder Hersleb (1730–1765) was a Lutheran minister. Their eldest sister Frederikke Louise Pedersdatter Hersleb (1720–1780) was married to Bishop of Roskilde Ludvig Harboe. The sister Petronelle Helene Hersleb (1724–1778) was married to Supreme Court justice Andreas Jacobsen Graah (1701–1780). The sister Bolette Sophie Hersleb (1728–1765) was married to the civil servant and director of Vejsenhuset Peter Jensen Aagaard (1718–1789).

== Career ==
In 1743, Hersleb was employed as secretary in Danske Kancelli. In 1745–1763, he served as district judge (landsdommer) on Zealand. In 1754, he was appointed deputy burgermaster in Copenhagen. In 1771, he was removed from this post by Johann Friedrich Struensee alongside the other members of Copenhagen's Magistracy. After Struensee's fall in 1772, he was reinstalled as burgermaster.

In 1772–76. he served concurrently as one of the directors of Bistrup Manor. In 1758–88, he managed the Harboeske Enkefruekloster. During his years as manager, its building on Stormgade saw two expansions. In 1760–66. He served as one of the directors of the Royal Danish Theatre. From 1747, he was a member of the Royal Danish Society for National History. Together with councilman Morten Munck, he was charged with overseeing the reorganization of Copenhagen City Archives (completed November 1787).

He was awarded the title of Justitsråd in 1747, Virkelig justitsråd in 1754, etatsråd in 1766 and Konferensråd in 1776.

== Personal life ==
On 23 April1755, in Church of Our Lady in Copenhagen, Herslev was wed to Catharina Magdalene Munck (c. 1728 – 1804). She was a daughter of Supreme Court justice Lauritz Munck (c. 1697 – 1758) and Sara Ørslev (c. 1701 – 1781).

Herslev died on 22 February 1788 in Copenhagen. He is buried in Holmen Church. He was survived by one son and oine daughter. The son Peder Hersleb (1756–1785) was a Supreme Court attorney. He was married to Louise Henriette Jensdatter Beck (1759–1831), a daughter of Jens Michelsen Beck. The daughter Bolette Sara Laurentze Hersleb (1763–1808) was married to Michael Fabritius de Tengnagel (1759–1808).
