= Daniel Bentley (civil servant) =

Danish civil servant

Daniel Gottvald Reimer Bentley (13 December 1786 – 13 June 1869) was a Danish civil servant. He served as mayor of Copenhagen from 1822 to 1857.

== Early life and education ==
Daniel Bentley was born on 13 January 1786 in Copenhagen to Richard Bentley and Maria née Reimer. His father, an English silk dyer, had come to Copenhagen to work at Niels Lunde Reiersen's silk factory in Bredgade. Bentley studied law at the University of Copenhagen. His brother Richard pursued a career in the Danish Asiatic Company.

== Career ==
Bentley was employed as underkancellist in the Danske Kancelli in 1806. He was promoted to chancellery secretary (kancellisekretær) in 1808 and then to kontorchef and secretary of the Department of Norwegian Affairs in 1812. In 1813, he was awarded the title of kancelliråd (Chancellery Councillor). The Department of Norwegian Affairs was closed when the personal union with Norway was dissolved in 1814.

In 1815, Bentley was appointed as mayor (borgmester), bailiff (byfoged) and scribe (by- og rådstueskriver) of Køge, bailiff and scribe (herredsfoged and skriver) of Bjæverskov Herred, and as birk judge (birkedommer) of Gammel Køgegårds Birk.

In 1821, he was appointed as mayor of Copenhagen. In Fædrelandet, towards the end of his career, National Liberal politicians criticized him for opposing "even the most insignificant reforms". He retired as Mayor of Copenhagen in conjunction with the 1857 Copenhagen Municipal Reform.

== Personal life ==
Bentley married Cecilie Catharine Lehmann (1798–1882), a daughter of captain Johan Frederik Lehmann and Ellen Margrethe née Nyegaard.

== Awards ==
He was awarded the title of justitsråd in 1822, etatsråd in 1826 and konferensråd in 1849. In 1856, he was created a Commander in the Order of the Dannebrog.
