= Ane Cathrine Andersdatter =

Executed Danish serial killer

- Born: 20 October 1829; Karrebæk, Denmark
- Died: 21 December 1861 (aged 32); Rødovre, Denmark
- Cause of death: Execution by decapitation
- Conviction: Murder x3
- Penalty: Death

Details
- Victims: 3
- Span of crimes: 1853–1861
- Country: Denmark
- State: Capital Region
- Date apprehended: 30 March 1861

Ane Cathrine Andersdatter (20 October 1829 – 21 December 1861) was a Danish serial killer who murdered three of her children between 1853 and 1861, shortly after their births.

For her crimes, she was beheaded on Rødovre Mark north of Damhuskroen by Annexgårdsvej, in the current residential area of Søtorp. She was the last woman executed in the country, and the only one to be executed since the abolition of the absolute monarchy.

== First child ==
While working as a maid on a farm in Herlufmagle, Andersdatter became pregnant by the tenant. On 3 January 1853, at age 23, she gave birth to a daughter at the Fødselsstiftelsen in Copenhagen. However, the child's father was uninterested in looking after her and returned to Sweden. Unable to care for her, Andersdatter set out for Ringsted, where she planned to give the child up for adoption. When she reached a farm near Vigerslev, she sat down at the edge of a ditch, and as she breastfed her baby, it occurred to her that she could easily drown her in the icy ditch water. After doing so, she buried the body in a field. The remains were never found. Andersdatter then went on to serve on the Barfredshøj farm in Ramsø in the summer of 1854.

== Second child ==
Two years later, Andersdatter became pregnant again, this time by a fellow servant who was unfaithful to his wife. On 3 April 1855, she gave birth to a boy, but was due to begin work in three weeks, leaving her unable to care for him. At first, she thought of asking his father for help and went to Rødovre, where he was working on a farm, but remembering how harshly he had treated her, she decided against it. On her way back, she stopped at a well she had noticed on the corner of Rødovrevej and Rødager. She threw the baby into the well, then continued along. A month later, the body was found, but since police were unable to find any evidence leading to the perpetrator, the case was quickly closed.

== Third child ==
In 1856, Andersdatter gave birth to her third child, again by a servant. This one she took home to her mother, letting the boy grow up with his grandmother. The couple were unmarried, but in 1861, she became pregnant again, without the father's knowledge. Remaining silent about the pregnancy, she travelled to Copenhagen on 1 February, where she gave birth to a son on 15 February at the house of a Borgergade family, who had been assigned by the Fødselsstiftelsen to look after her. Concerning the child's father, she wrote to him claiming that she was in Karrebæk, looking after her sick mother.

== Fourth child, arrest and execution ==
At the beginning of March, Andersdatter told her hosts in Borgergade that her mother had sent word that the child could be cared for by a family of crofters based in Karrebæk. On 5 March she left with the baby, first to Frederiksberg Gardens, where she planned to drown it in one of the canals. However, there were too many people, so she instead changed her route to Damhus Lake. Since it was crowded there as well, she remembered the well at the corner of Rødovrevej and Rødager, where she had drowned the second child years before. She waited until nightfall, when there were fewer people around, then threw the child into a well and returned to her lodging in Borgergade, where she claimed that the boy had been picked up by the family in Ringsted as agreed.

On 30 March the dead baby was found, and this time, police arrested Andersdatter, who had been seen snooping around the area. She immediately made a full confession, and during interrogations, it also emerged that she had killed two previous children. At her trial, eight of the ten Supreme Court justices wanted to pardon her, as had become customary, stating that a servant and single mother, she was unable to properly care for the children; her good employment record, and not the least, that she had repented and found comfort in her faith. Andersdatter kept saying that she loved her children, but could not think of any way to provide support without turning to prostitution or giving them away to poor farmers. Nevertheless, she was sentenced to death, with the verdict upheld by Frederick VII by request of the Justice Minister, a move backed by the outraged public. The only major difference was that the execution would be held in private.

On 21 December 1861, the convict was driven to the courthouse on Rødovre Mark in a mistful morning, where many had turned up. She calmly climbed onto the scaffold, said a small prayer, and put her neck scarf in her pocket and her head on the chopping block. Second later, the executioner dropped his axe on her, beheading her instantly. As usual, the deceased was placed in a black-painted coffin instead of the usual flat coffins made from boards.

== See also ==
- List of serial killers by country

== Bibliography ==
- Henry Hansen (2013). Ane Cathrine Andersdatter: convicted of murdering three of her children: beheaded on 21 December 1861 in Rødovre Mark as the last woman executed in Denmark (in Danish). Archived from the original on 11 December 2019.
