= Birgitte Berg Nielsen =

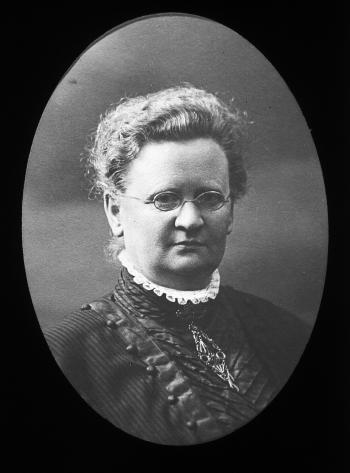
Birgitte Berg Nielsen

Birgitte Berg Nielsen (1861–1951) was a Danish educator and a pioneering women's rights activist. Her work focused on housekeeping which she promoted as a subject to be taught on the same basis as agriculture. She became especially interested and competent in the field of nutrition, including related economic considerations. Unable to obtain support from existing institutions, in 1905 she opened her own Husholdningsskole og Husholdningsseminarium (Housekeeping School and Housekeeping Teacher Training College) in the Frederiksberg district of Copenhagen. From 1912 to 1933, she published several books on nutrition.

== Biography ==
Born in Vandborg Parish near Lemvig in northwestern Jutland, Ane Birgitte Berg was the daughter of the schoolteacher Jens Nikolaj Poulsen Berg (1827–1881) and his wife Dorthe Marie née Jensen (1835–1909). In August 1887, she married the carpenter Rasmus August Nielsen (1859–1939). As a member of a family active in politics, she set out from childhood to become a teacher. After completing schooling at Askov Højskole in 1877, she served an apprenticeship as a dairy maid (1878–80) before completing teacher training at Femmers Kvindeseminarium in 1882.

While teaching privately, she began to recognize the importance of the need for housekeeping schools for women on the same basis as agricultural schools existed for men. While working as a teacher in Copenhagen (1885–1906), she presented plans to the municipality for introducing housekeeping as a subject for girls' education after primary school. During this period, Nielsen became an active member of the Danish Women's Society where she participated in discussions on the need for improvements in the employment and training of housemaids. She presented proposals and published papers on the need for housekeeping education, not simply as a matter for high schools but as a component of the social, health and economic improvements the government needed to address. Women were not born housewives but needed to "learn something to be something". By learning more about nutrition and financing adapted to homes of different levels of income, women would be able to participate more actively in society at large.

As Nielsen's proposals were not accepted by the authorities, in 1905 she established her Housekeeping School in Frederiksberg. She also maintained a laboratory there where she was able to conduct studies on nutrition. As courses on housekeeping were slowly introduced, she became a state consultant and supervisor. She retired in 1908.

Birgitte Berg Nielsen died in Frederiksberg on 13 December 1951.
