= Ernst Meyer (painter) =

Danish painter (1797–1861)

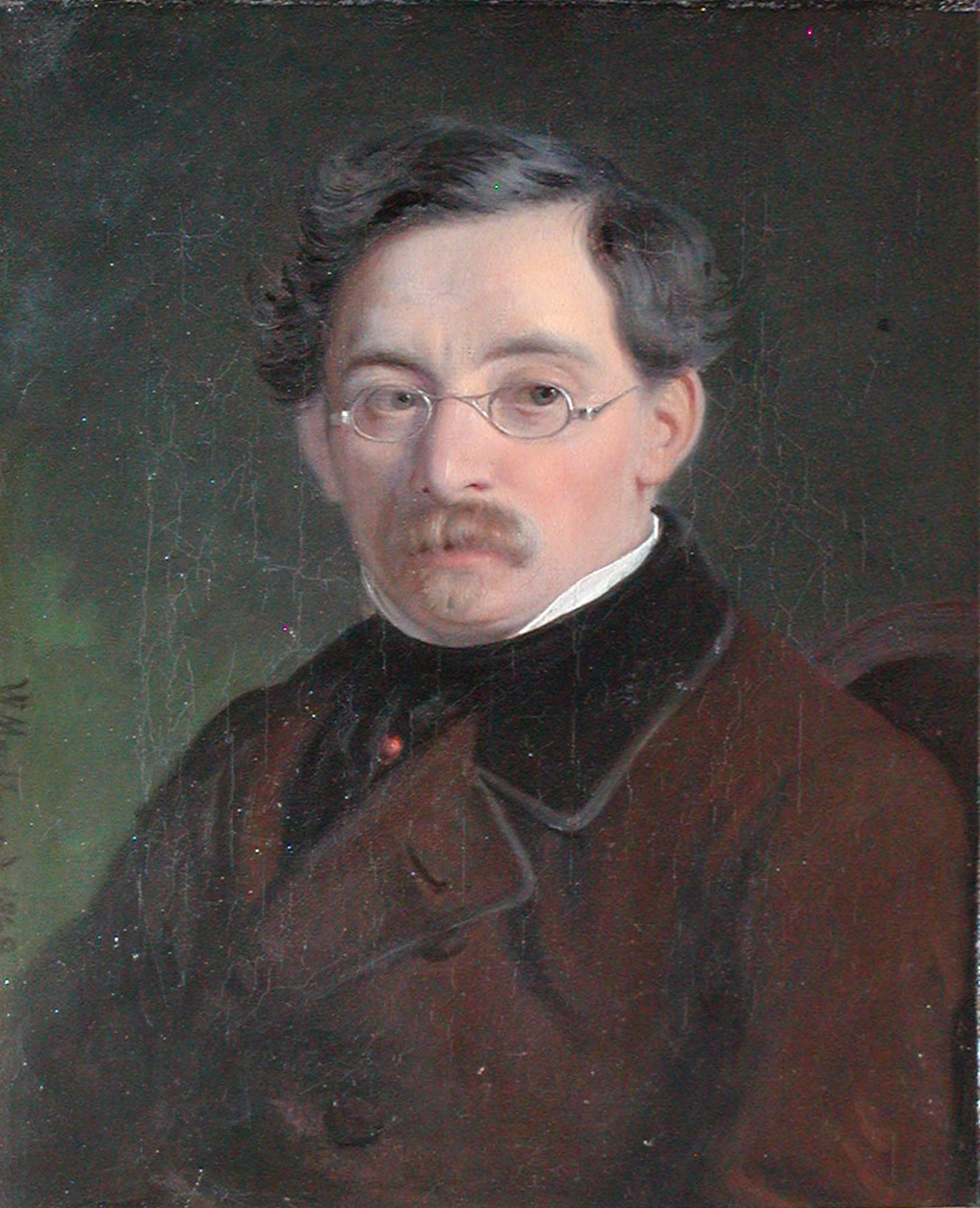
Ernst Meyer, portrait by Wilhelm Marstrand (1848)

Ernst Meyer, born Ahron Meyer (11 May 1797 – 31 January 1861) was a Danish genre painter.

== Biography ==
Meyer was born Altona (then in the Duchy of Schleswig, now in Hamburg, Germany). He was of Jewish ancestry. His father, Salomon Abraham Meyer, operated a brokerage firm. When he was year old, his parents divorced and his mother went to Copenhagen, where she remarried; this time to a grocer. In 1812, when it became clear that he was interested in art rather than business, his father refused to continue supporting him and sent him to join his mother's new family.

There a business associate of his cousin, the wholesale grocer and economic writer Mendel Levin Nathanson, took him under his wing, helped him audit classes at the Royal Academy and found him a position in the workshop of artist C.A. Lorentzen. From 1816 to 1818, he attended the academy's "Modelskole" and was awarded two silver medals.

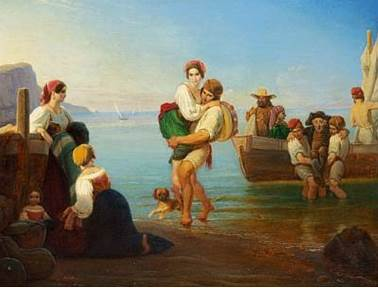
Landing on Capri

His first exhibition consisted entirely of copies of old works. His first original works show the influence of C.W. Eckersberg, who was a professor at the academy, although he never took any classes from him. His goal, however, was to be a history painter and, in 1819, he competed for a gold medal with a work depicting Joseph and Pharaoh. He failed to win and, at the urging of friends, took time off to travel. He returned in 1821, competed and lost again, removed all of his works from the academy's gallery and gave up history painting.

He then went to Munich, where he came under the influence of Peter von Cornelius and became so involved in mastering his Catholic-oriented style that he decided not to return to Denmark. None of his paintings from this period were exhibited there. Then in 1824, sculptor Herman Wilhelm Bissen, convinced Meyer to accompany him to Rome. It was the colorful street life there that first inspired him to paint genre scenes.

As more artists from Copenhagen began coming to Rome, he was reconciled with the past and, in 1827, started exhibiting in Denmark again. In 1833, his portrait of a Neapolitan fishing family was purchased by Crown Prince (later King) Christian. His painting of sailors carrying their passengers ashore on Capri has been reproduced numerous times.

In 1841, he began to suffer from serious episodes of what was probably rheumatoid arthritis (although some sources suggest it may have been syphilis) and he made an extended visit to the spa at Gräfenberg, Bavaria, in an effort to restore his health. Afterward, he visited Denmark for a year and was elected a member of the academy.

He returned to Italy, but was forced to leave by the Revolutions of 1848. He spent the next four years in Germany, France and Switzerland; spending time at several spas, to no avail. By this time, his affliction had worsened to the point that he had to walk with crutches and his hands were too deformed to paint in oils. Rather than give up, he taught himself to paint with watercolors and was soon using subtle hues that had been missing from his earlier work. Despite his weakness, he travelled often and seemed content until he suffered a stroke during his morning walk in Rome during 1861. He was carried home unconscious and lingered for a day while his neighbors kept vigil (he never married and had no children). A torchlight procession led his remains to rest in the Jewish section at Campo Verano.

== Selected paintings ==
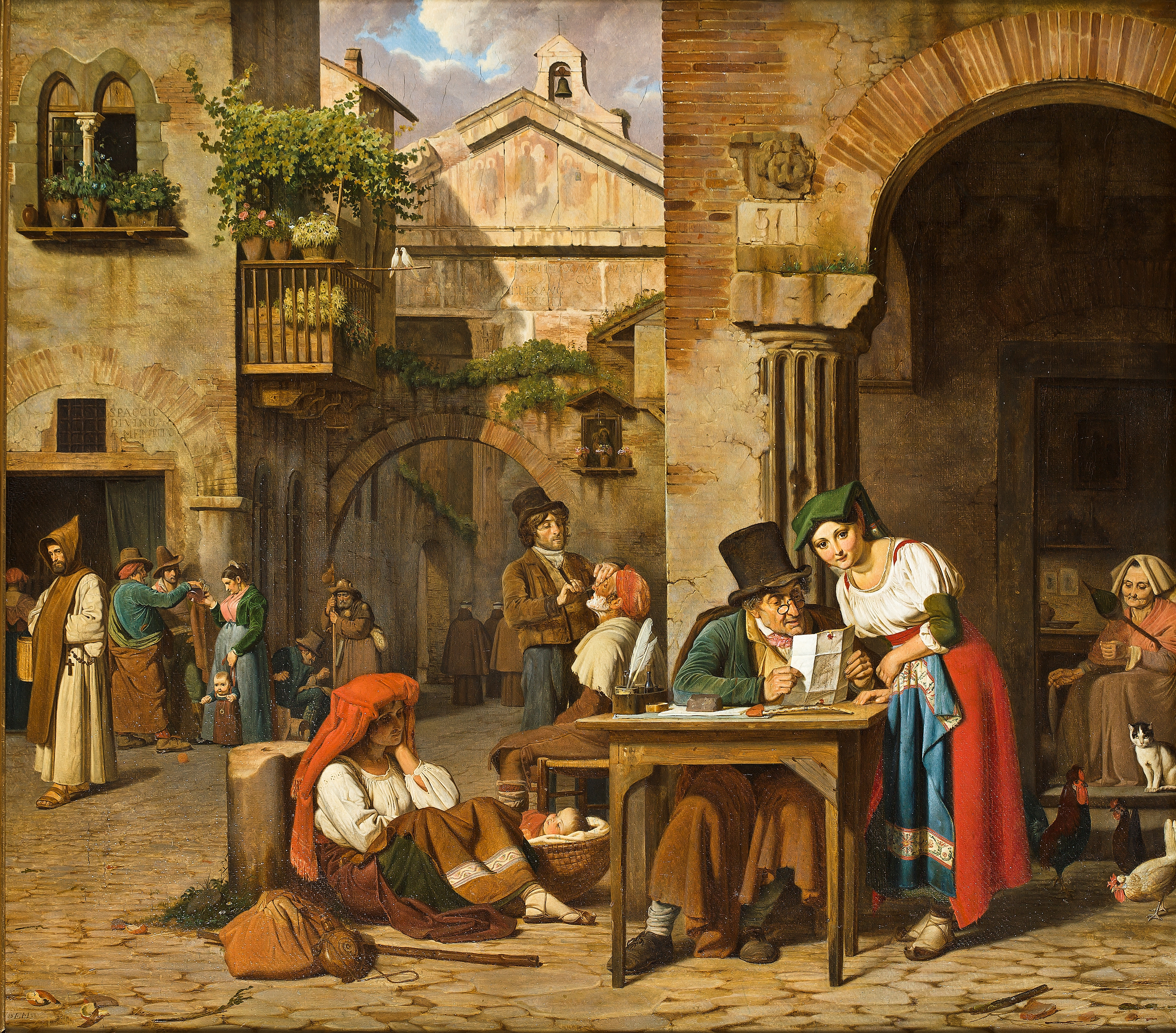
A Public Scrivener Reading a Letter
to a Young Girl

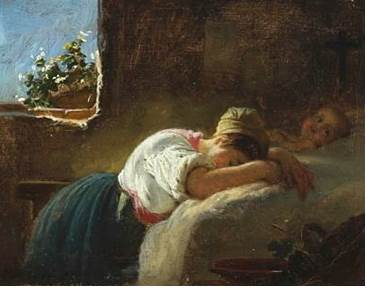
Interior with Sleeping Mother and Child

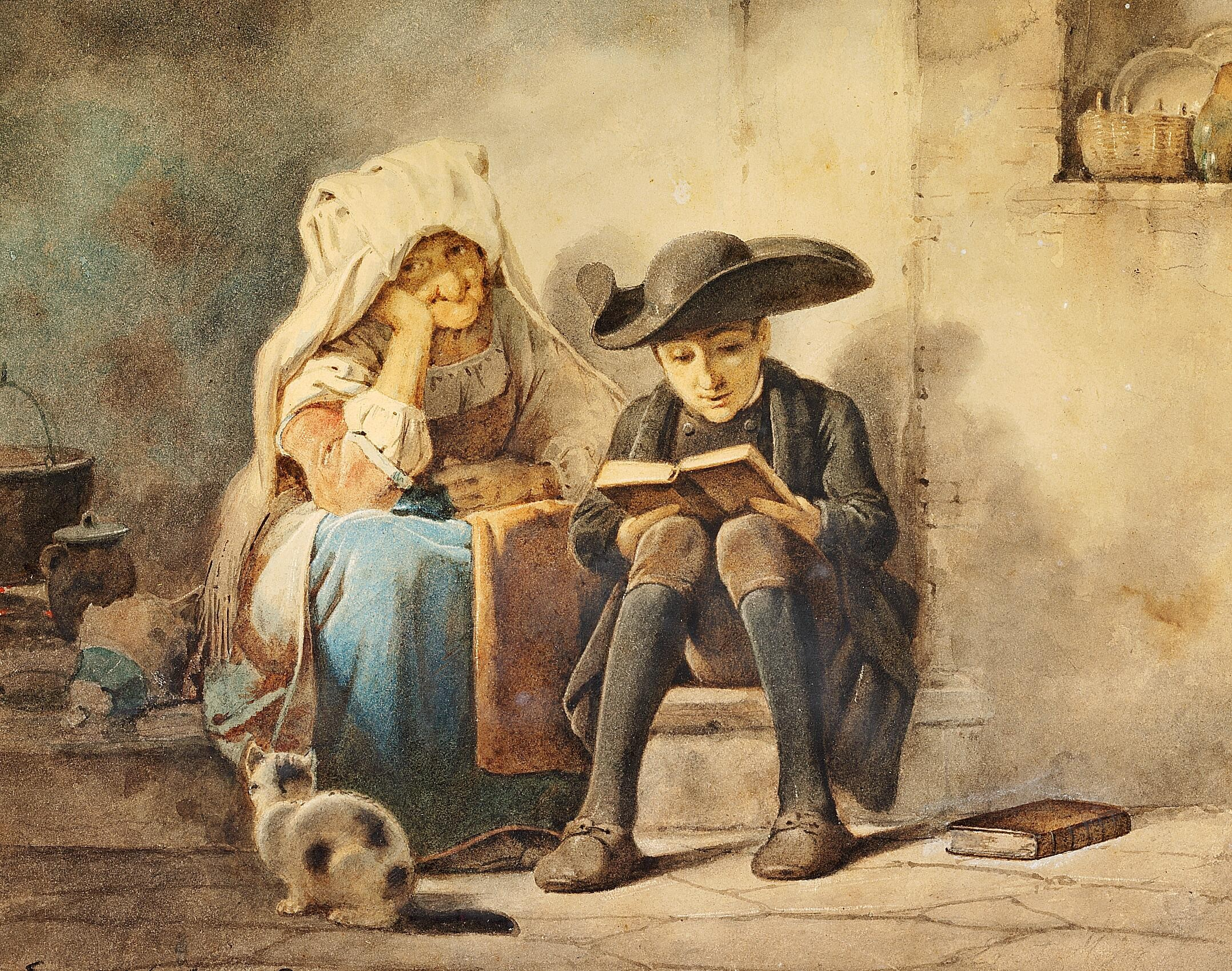
The Little Abbot and his Grandmother
