= Adda Ravnkilde =

Danish writer (1862–1883)

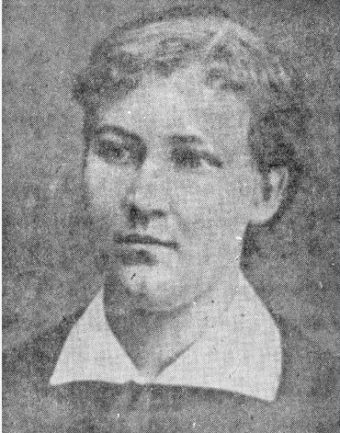
Adda Ravnkilde

Adele Marie "Adda" Ravnkilde (30 July 1862 – 30 November 1883) was a Danish writer who experienced a bitter conflict between her desire to accomplish creative work and the attraction of erotic love. When she was just 21, she committed suicide, leaving three manuscripts which were edited and/or shortened by her friend and advisor George Brandes or by the author Erik Skram. On publication in 1884, all three proved to be highly successful, making Ravnkilde one of Denmark's main precursors of modern women's literature.

== Biography ==
Born in Sakskøbing on 30 July 1862, Adele Marie Ravnkilde was the daughter of the county clerk Christian Claudius Ravnkilde (1835–1896) and his wife Margrethe Catinka Vilhelmine née Bruun (1835–1912). She was the oldest of the family's five children. In addition to attending the local girls' school, she was tutored at home by an English woman. She went on to spend two years at N. Zahle's School in Copenhagen. But she also read widely herself, taking an interest in philosophy, history and literature, and absorbing the works of the leading Danish authors of the day such as Henrik Ibsen and Herman Bang and studying Charles Darwin's On the Origin of Species. Ravnkilde was particularly influenced by John Stuart Mill's The Subjection of Women with its suggestion that modern women should have the opportunity to develop under the same conditions as men while marriage should be based on mutual love and freedom.

After unsuccessfully working as a home tutor, she spent two years at her parents' home in Sæby where she started more or less secretly writing what would become En Pyrrhussejr (A Pyrrhic Victory). In 1881, she fell passionately in love with the 35-year-old farmer Peter Bønnum Scavenius. But the relationship came to nothing as Ravnkilde's idealism was simply not compatible with Scavenius' aristocratic eroticism although it certainly influenced her writing.

Adda Ravnkilde took her own life on 30 November 1883, aged 21, in the Frederiksberg district of Copenhagen. She was buried in Sæby.

== Publications ==
Three manuscripts of novels were left after her death. Under the leadership of Georg Brandes, whom she had consulted on her writings, they were edited and considerably shortened with the help of Martinus Galschiøt and Erik Skram. Judith Fürste was published early in 1884 and was reprinted in the autumn. Her two other stories, En Pyrrhussejr and Tantaluskvaler (The Anguish of Tantalus) were published together in December 1884 as To Fortællinger. Judith Fürste was published in German in 1888.
