= Lewin Jürgen Rohde =

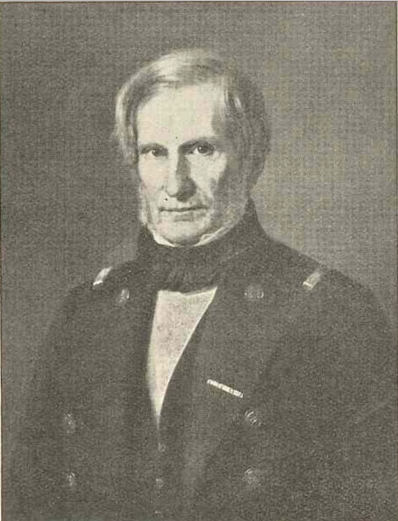
Levin Jürgen Rohde

Commander-Captain Lewin Jürgen Rohde (23 October 1786 – 2 August 1857) was a Danish naval officer, cartographer, writer and colonial administrator. In 1830 and again in 1831–32, during Frederik Ludvig Christian Pentz Rosenørn's absence, he served as acting Governor of St. Thomas and St. Jan.

== Early life and education ==
Rohde was born on 23 October 1786 on Saint Thomas in the Danish West Indies to merchant Jørgen Lewin Rohde (1735-1793) and Marie née Magens (1754-1833). His sister Anna Elisabeth Rohde (1784-1818) married George Brown (1773-1818), a son of John Brown and Anne Appleby.

== Career ==
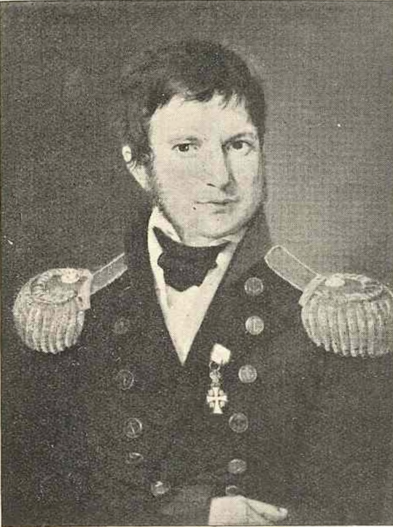
Levin Jïrgen Rohde.

Rohde became a naval cadet in 1807. On 3 July 1808, he became a second lieutenant. He served in Norway during the Napoleonic Wars. In 1814, he was granted 9–10 months' leave to visit his family in the Danish West Indies. On St. Thomas, Governor-General Oxholm charged him with creating a map of the island's harbour. On 26 July 1816, his travel permit was therefore extended. He was just a few days later promoted to first lieutenant. In 1819, he was offered a position as assistant to harbour master Carl Gottlieb Fleischer. On 14 November 1819, he was promoted to captain lieutenant. In 1821, he succeeded Fleicher as harbour master on St. Thomas, with rank of captain. In 1825, he was appointed as harbour master with rank of commander-captain. He served as acting governor of the Danish West Indies from 1830 to 1832.

He retired from his position as harbour master on 1 April 1854. He was succeeded by his brother-in-law, Thomas Andreas Kjær.

== Written works ==
In 1822. Rohde published a map and description of the southern part of St. Thomas. In 1828, Rohde published a highly regarded work on the codes of signals at sea. entitled The Universal Sea Language. It was translated into German, French, English, Serdish, Spanish, Dutch and Russian.

== Personal life and legacy ==
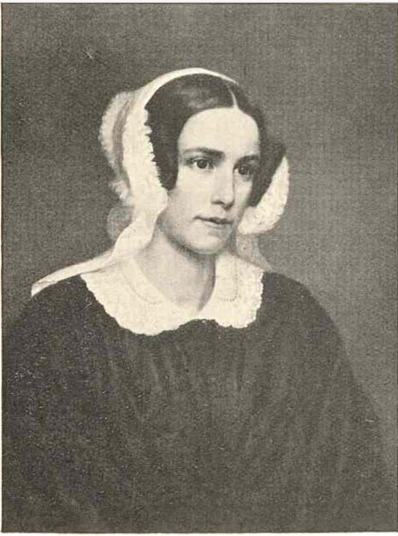
Louise Rohde, née Brown.

Rohde married to his niece Louise Brown, daughter of George Brown and of Anna Elisabeth Rohde. The couple had seven children:

In around 1822–23. Rohde constructed the house at Dronningensgade 26–27, King's Quarter, Charlotte Amalie. He also constructed the country house Louisenhøj on a hillside outside Charlotte Amalie.

In 1826, he was created as Lmight in the Order of the Dannebrog. In 1946, he was awarded the Cross of Honour.

Rohde moved to Copenhagen shortly after his retirement as harbour master in 1854. He died on 2 August 1857. He left an estate of approximately 74,000 rigsdaler.

His former country house Louisehøj is now a ruin. The National Museum of Denmark purchased a painting of it at a Bruun Rasmussen auction in 2002. A portrait painting of Louise Rohde née Brown was sold to another boyer at the same Vruun Rasmussen auction.≠ A silver tea set which used to belong to Rohde is also in the collection of the National Museum of Denmark.

A rare collection of 12 daguerreotypes and one ambrotype as well as two poetry books, all dating from the 1840s and 1860s and with relations to the family of Levin Jürgen Rohde, is now in the collection of the National Library of Denmark. It comprises one portrait of Levin Jürgen Rohde, two double portraits of him and his wife, another double portrait of their two daughters, one group portrait of Rodhe, his wife and one daughter, two portraits of their black servants and also a number of unidentified portraits, probably with relations to the Rohde family. Two are from the American photographer John Keenan, 248 South Second Street, Philadelphia.

== Gallery ==
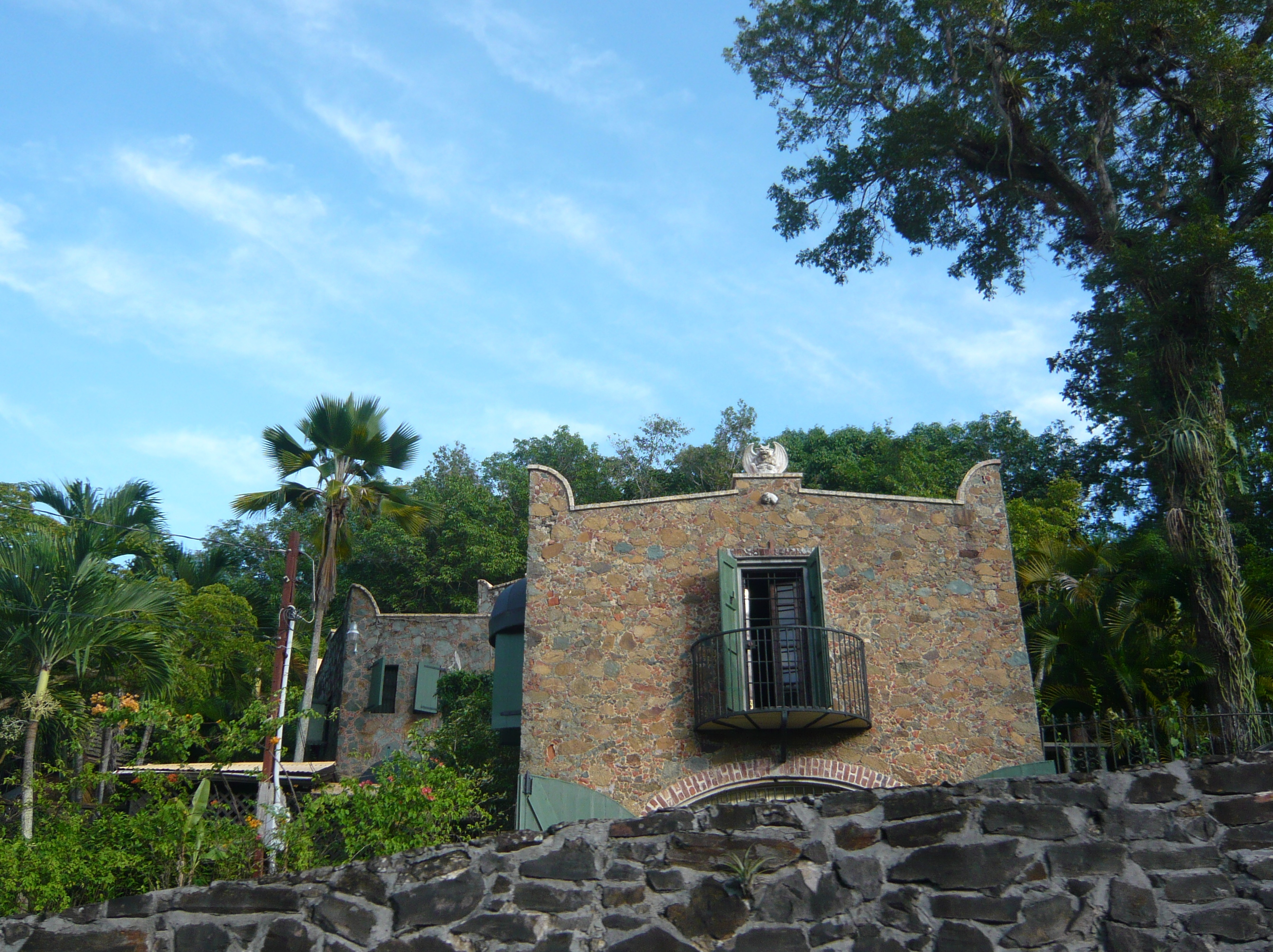
The Louisehoj ruins in 2010.

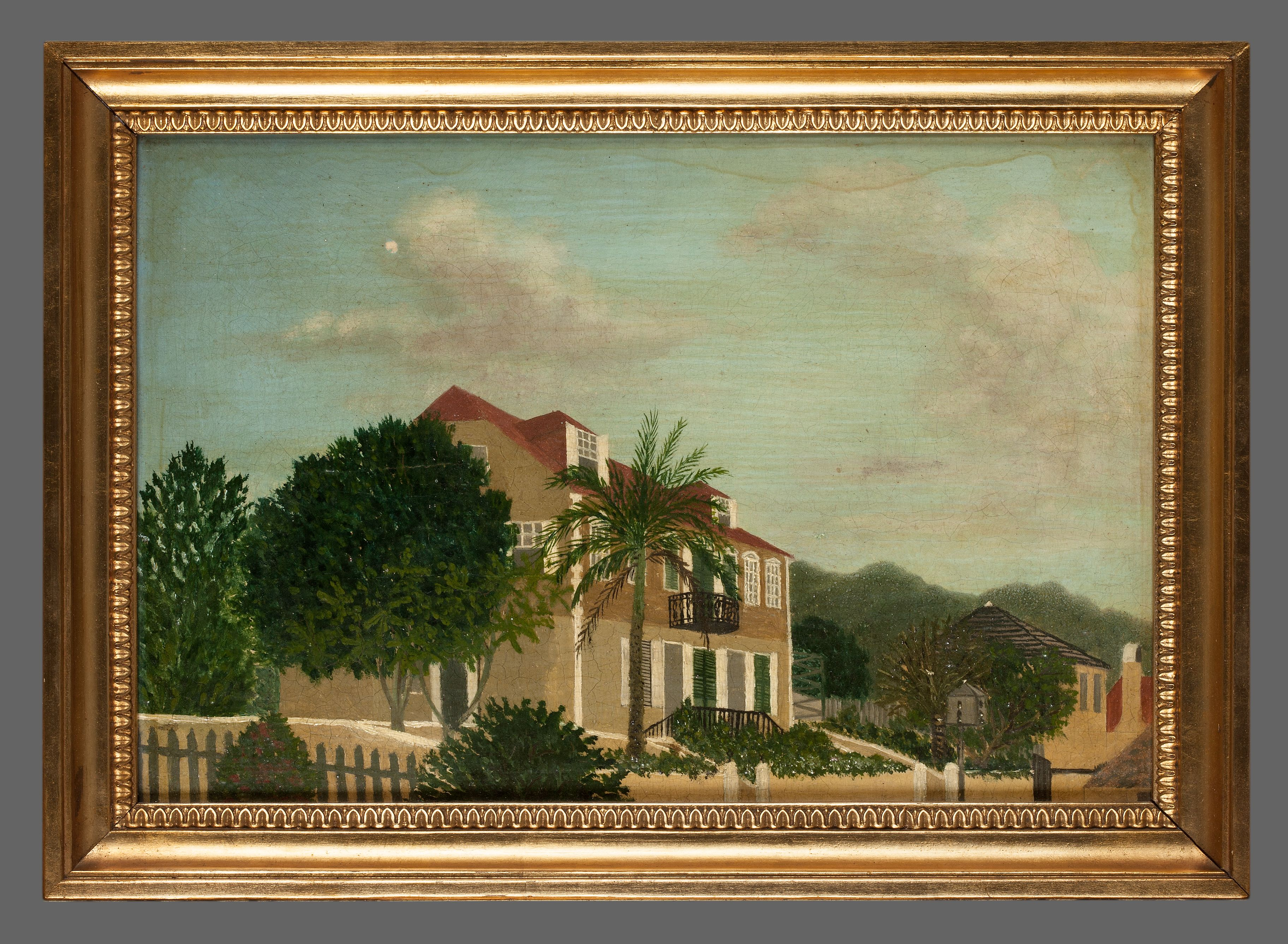
Painting of Louisenhøj, National Museum of Denmark.

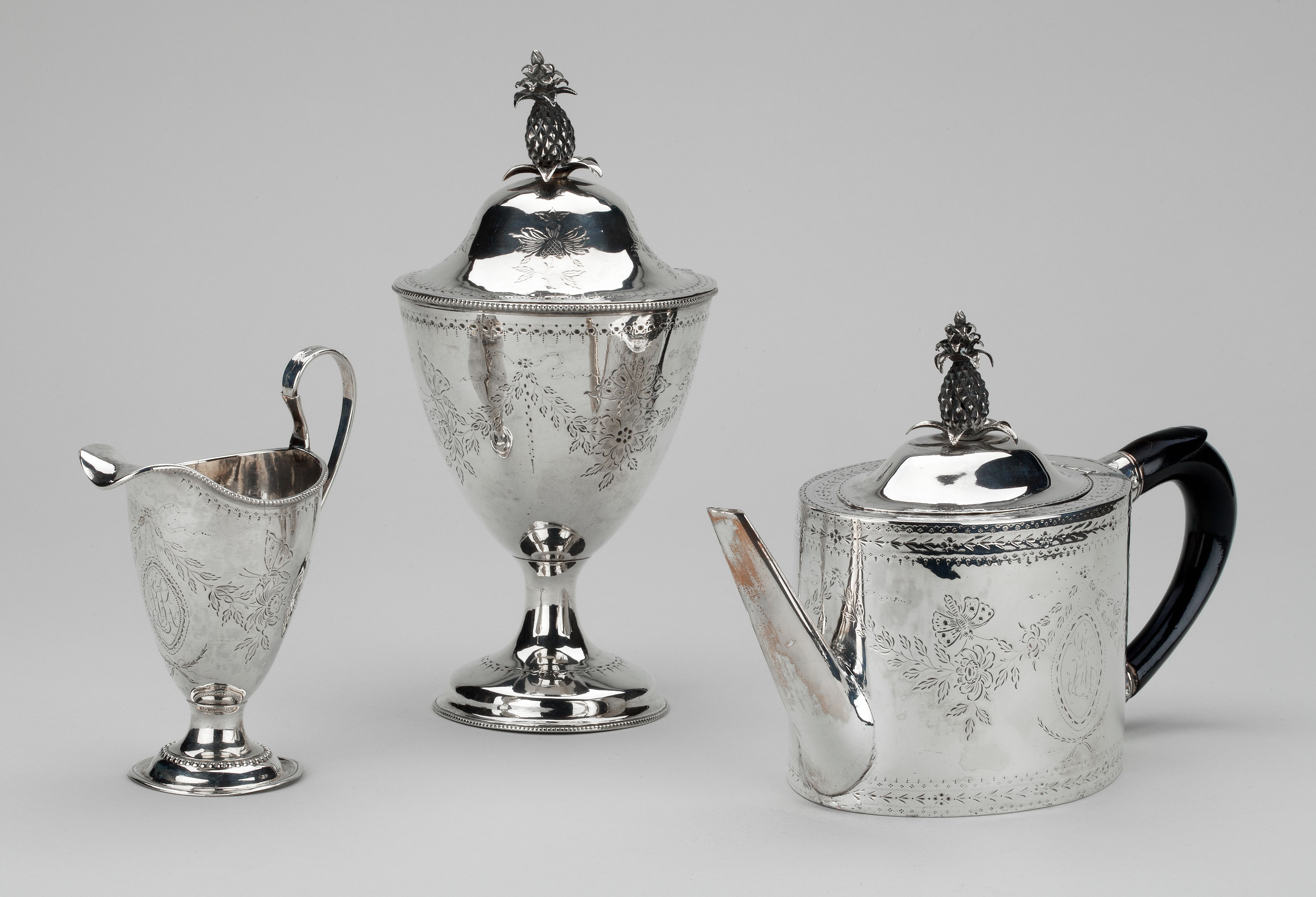
L- I- Tohde's tea set, National Museum of Denmark.
