= Catharine Wernicke =

Danish pianist (1789–1862)

Catharine Riddervold Wernicke
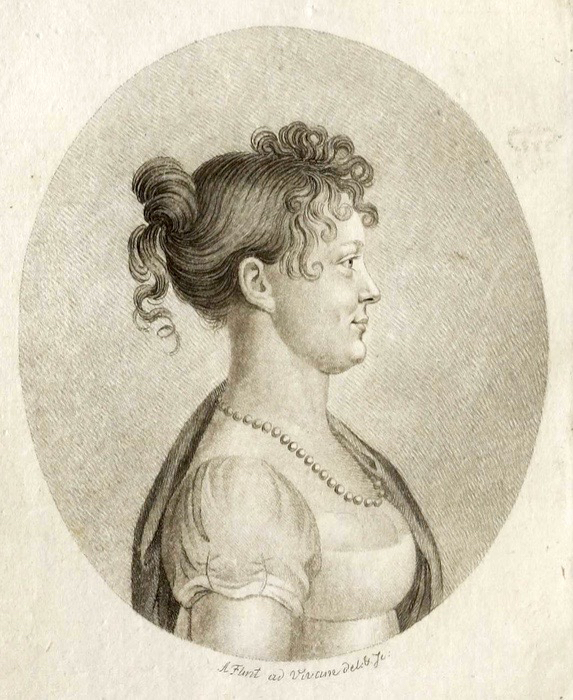
- Wernicke, c. 1811
- Born: Catharine Riddervold Wernicke; 14 April 1789; Kolding, Denmark
- Died: 5 June 1862 (aged 73); Kolding, Denmark
- Occupation: Pianist

Catharine Riddervold Wernicke (14 April 1789 – 5 June 1862) was a Danish pianist.

== Biography ==
Born 14 April 1789, in Kolding, Wernicke was the daughter of Danish-Norwegian composer Israel Gottlieb Wernicke and Charlotte Louise Breetz (1763–1853). She became a prominent musician who, as far as it is known, is the first Danish woman to perform publicly as a pianist. In 1806, her father presented her at a concert in Hamburg, where she first attracted attention. In 1807, she and her father embarked on a concert tour of the country to collect for the needy after the Battle of Copenhagen during the Napoleonic Wars. They managed to hold a few concerts in eastern Holsteen and Zealand before they had to cancel the trip because of the death of Christian VII. The following year, they resumed concert activities in Odense and Ringsted where the proceeds went to distressed Norwegians and to the Education Institute for Girl Children by Government officials. In spring 1810, she gave two concerts and in 1824 one at the Royal Theatre.

In 1826, in Copenhagen, Wernicke married her schoolmate Frederik Christian Schouboe (1766-1829). After his death, she continued to live in the capital for a few years before moving back to her hometown of Kolding. She died there on 5 June 1862, aged 73.

Precision, great skill and imagination characterized her style. Steen Steensen Blicher wrote a tribute to her in his Piano Player's poem.
