= Christian Steen (publisher) =

Danish bookdealer and publisher

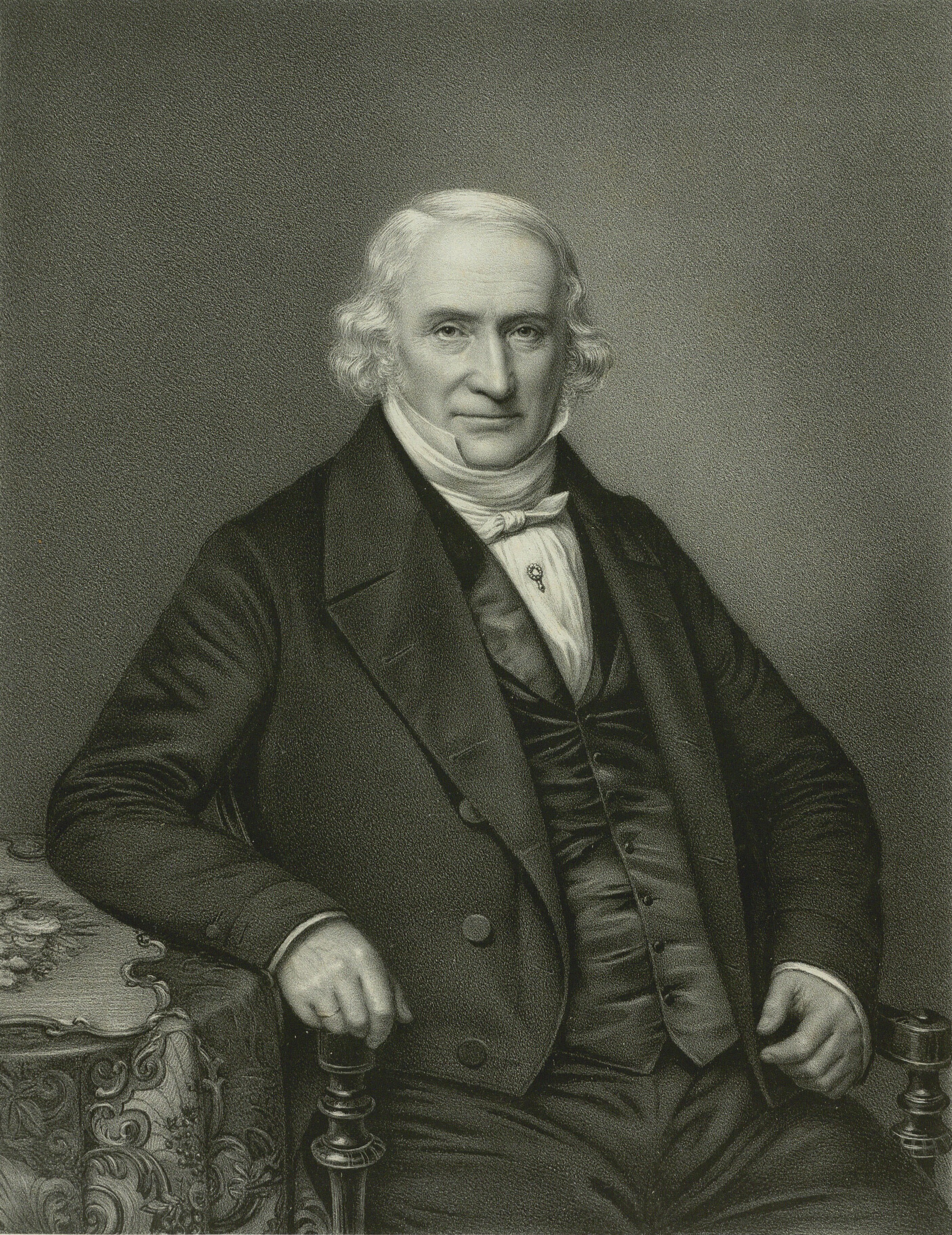
- Born: 6 October 1786; Steenbroen, Tårs Parish, Vendsyssel, Denmark
- Died: April 2, 1861 (aged 74)
- Burial place: Assistens Cemetery, Copenhagen
- Other names: Chr. Steen, Chr. Steen & Søn
- Occupation(s): Bookdealer, publisher

Christian Steen (6 October 1786 – 2 April 1861) was a Danish bookdealer and publisher. He traded first as Chr. Steen and then as Chr. Steen & Søn. He was a pioneer in the fields of publication of children's literature and maps in Denmark. Alongside his bookshop and publishing house, Steen ran a very large paper wholesale business. In 1844, he established Valdemarshåb paper factory near Køge.

== Early life ==
Steem was born on 6 October 1766 in Steenbroen, Tårs Parish, Vendsyssel. His parents were smallholder and carpenter Christen Christensen (c. 1729–1819) and Kirsten Margrethe Nielsdatter (c. 1747–1812).

== Career ==
In 1807, he came to Copenhagen where he became an apprentice in Arentzen & Hartier at Børsen. The firm went bankrupt in 1810. Steen took over the remains of the firm and immediately opened a bookshop in Helligeiststræde. He later moved it to the corner of Pilestræde and Sværtegade. In 1820, he bought the property at Kronprinsensgade 37.

Steen was also active in the market for book and magazine publishing. He initially traded as Chr. Steen but the name of the firm was changed to Chr. S. & Søn (Chr. Steen & Son) in 1846 after his son Hans Christian Frederik Syeen (1819–1871) had become a partner.

From 1810 to 1814, he published J. Kr. Høst's De franskes Keiser Napoleons Levnet I-II. In 1815–17, he published Adrastea, et Oppositionsblad, Litteraturen, Politiet og Theatret helliget. In 1832–36, he published Gallerie for danske og fremmede Classikere I-XXII (edited by Georg Carstensen). He also served as publisher for Beatus Dodts, Carit Etlar (Carl Brosbøll) and Meïr Goldschmidt. Other popular publications included N. Fr. Eibes sprogbøger_ 100 Timer i engelsk/tysk/fransk, translations of F. Marryat's novels and some schoolbooks. Some of his most ambitious publications were Herbarium oeconomicum and Herbarium pharmaceuticum, with hand-coloured copperplate engravings printed in his own workshop. He was the first publisher in Denmark to publish children's literature and picture books (mostly translations from German). He also pioneered the publication of maps and atlases in Danish.

Alongside his bookshop and publishing house, Steen ran a large paper wholesale business. In 1844, he financed the establishment of the Valdemarshåb paper factory near Køge, which, however, brought him great losses.

Steen was one of the founders of the Association of Booksellers in Copenhagen (1837).

== Personal life and leacy ==
Steen married on 12 August 1810 in Christianshavn to Hansine Christiana Margrethe Ussing (1784–1865). She was the daughter of Niels Ussing (1739–86) and Margrethe Kirstine Anchersen (1752–1816).

Steen died on 2 April 1862. He was buried at Assistens Cemetery. His son continued the firm but became ill, turned blind and died just ten years after his father. The firm was then continued by his widow Laura Steen (née Sønderberg, 1831–1916). In 1885, she sold it to V. Pio.
