= 1714 in Denmark =

- Decades: 1690s; 1700s; 1710s; 1720s; 1730s
- See also: Other events of 1714; List of years in Denmark

Events from the year 1714 in Denmark.

== Incumbents ==
- Monarch – Frederick IV
- Grand Chancellor – Christian Christophersen Sehested

== Events ==
- 18 April – The County of Knuthenborg is established by Adam Christopher Knuth from the manors of Knuthenborg, Maribo Ladegaard, Bandholmgård, Havlykke, Vårskov and Knuthenlund
- 10 December – the College of Missions is established.

=== Undated ===
- Louise of Mecklenburg-Güstrow is established.

== Births ==
- 28 May – Ole Stephansen, naval officer (died 1791)

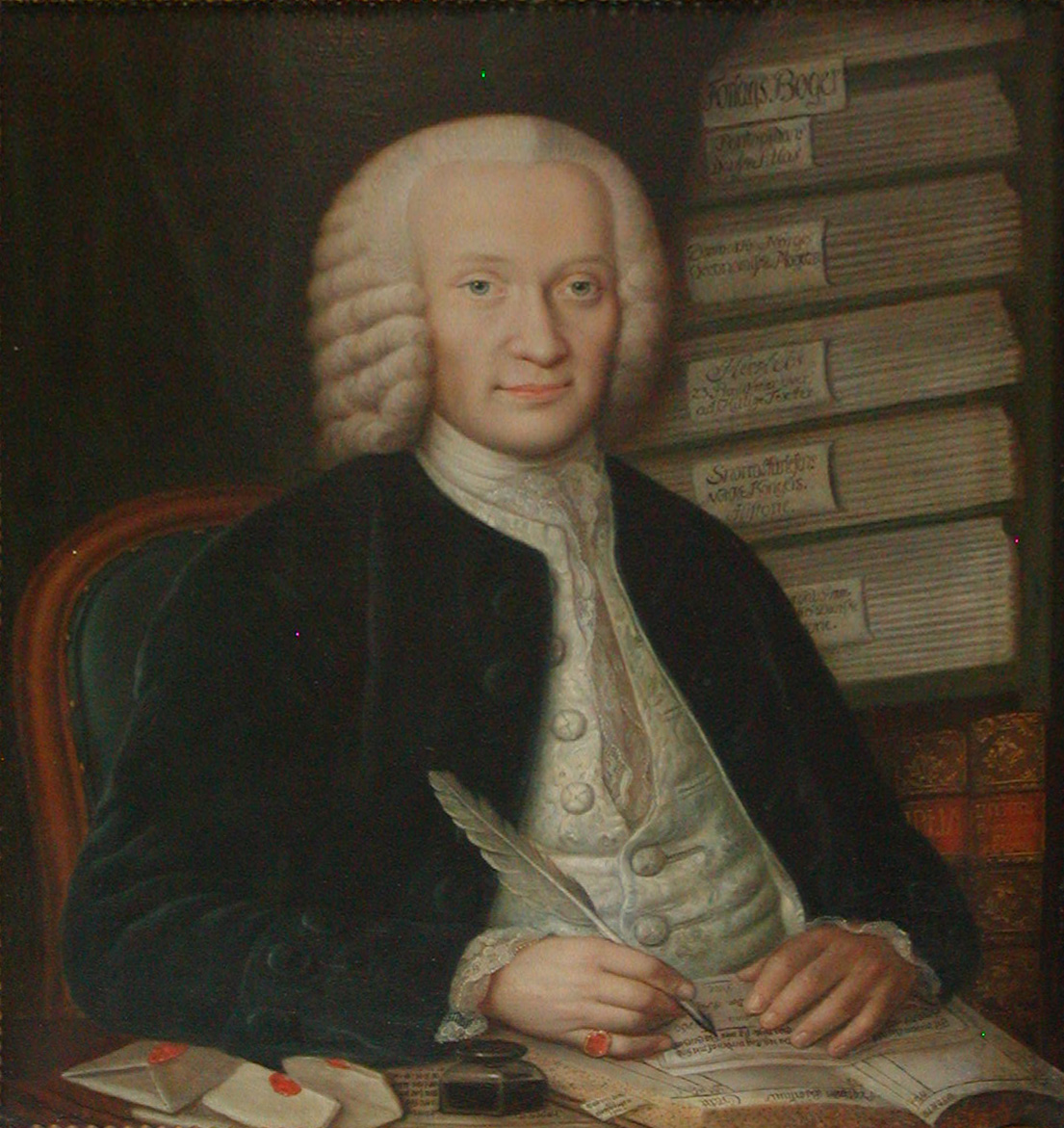
Andreas Hartvig Godiche.

- 23 August – Hans Jacob Scheel, Major-General (died 1774 in Norway)
- 11 December – Andreas Hartvig Godiche, publisher and printer (died 1870)

=== Undated ===
- Johan Foltmar – composer (died 1794)

== Deaths ==
- 27 March – Charlotte Amalie of Hesse-Kassel, Queen of Denmark and Norway (born 1650 in the Holy Roman Empire)
- 22 June – Peter Rodsteen, government official and landowner (born 1772)
- 6 August – Oliger Paulli, merchant and publisher (born 1644)
