= 1770 in Denmark =

- Decades: 1750s; 1760s; 1770s; 1780s; 1790s
- See also: Other events of 1770; List of years in Denmark

Events from the year 1770 in Denmark.

== Incumbents ==
- Monarch – Christian VII
- Prime minister – Count Johann Hartwig Ernst von Bernstorff (until 13 September), Johann Friedrich Struensee

== Events ==
March

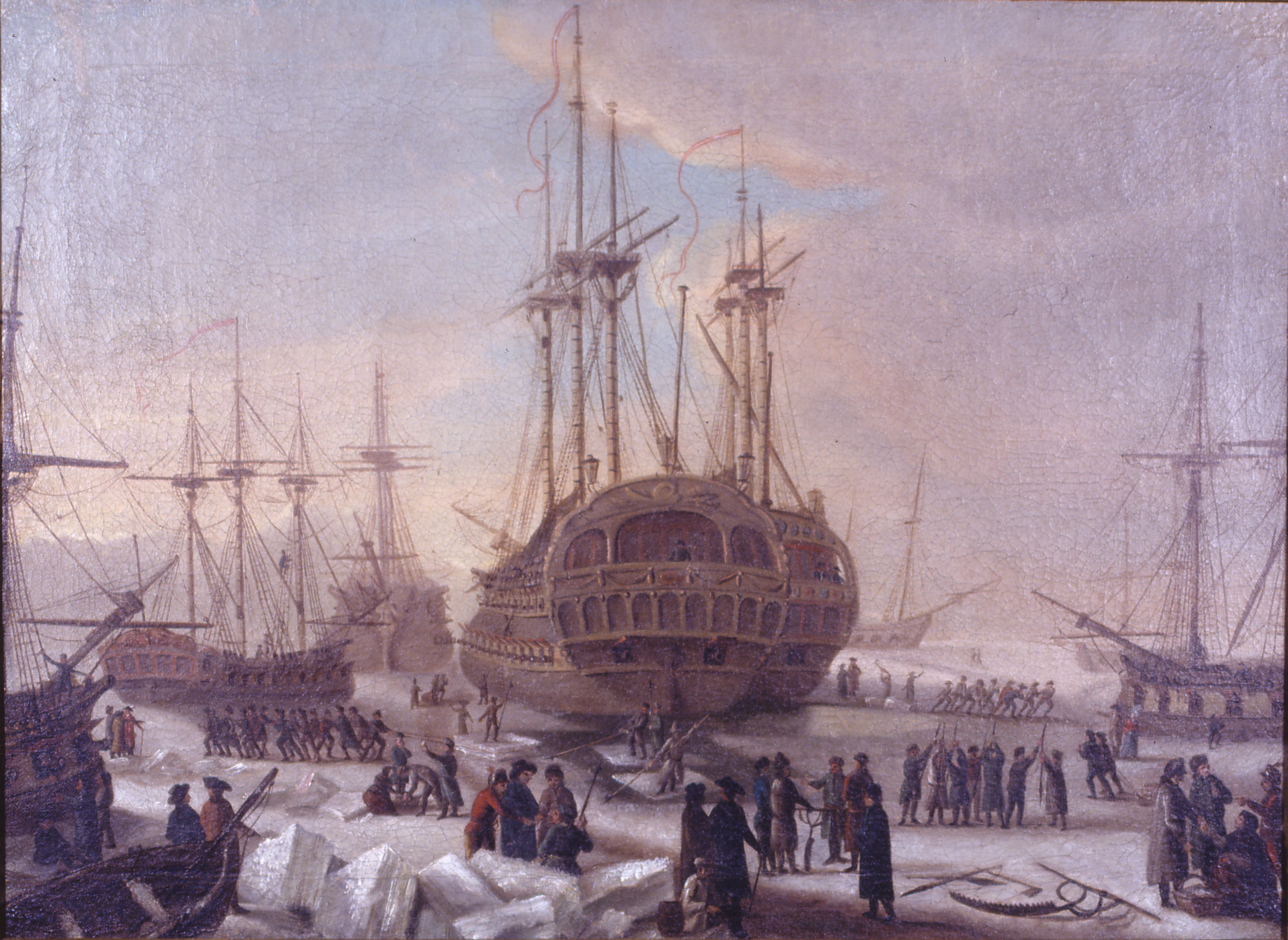
The Danish fleet bound for Algiers prior to its departure from Copenhagen

- 26 March – It is reported that it is possible to walk across the ice from Helsingør to Scania.

May

- 2 May – A Royal Danish Navy fleet bound for Algiers departs from Copenhagen to bomb the city in response to the recurrent pirate attacks in the Mediterranean Sea.

== Births ==
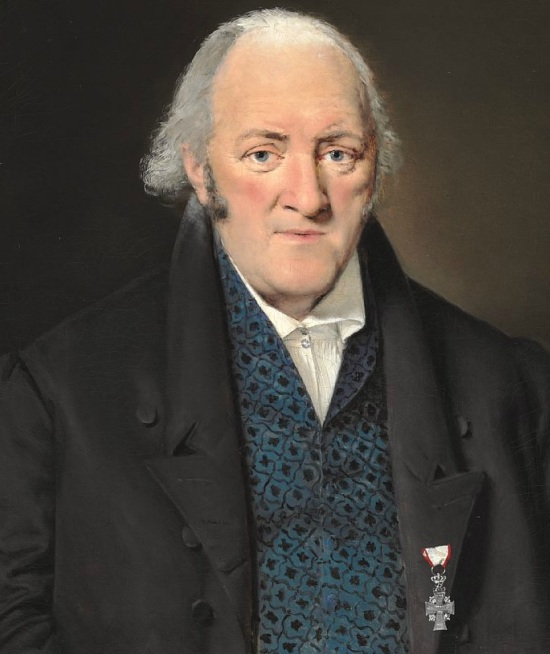
Lauritz Holmblad

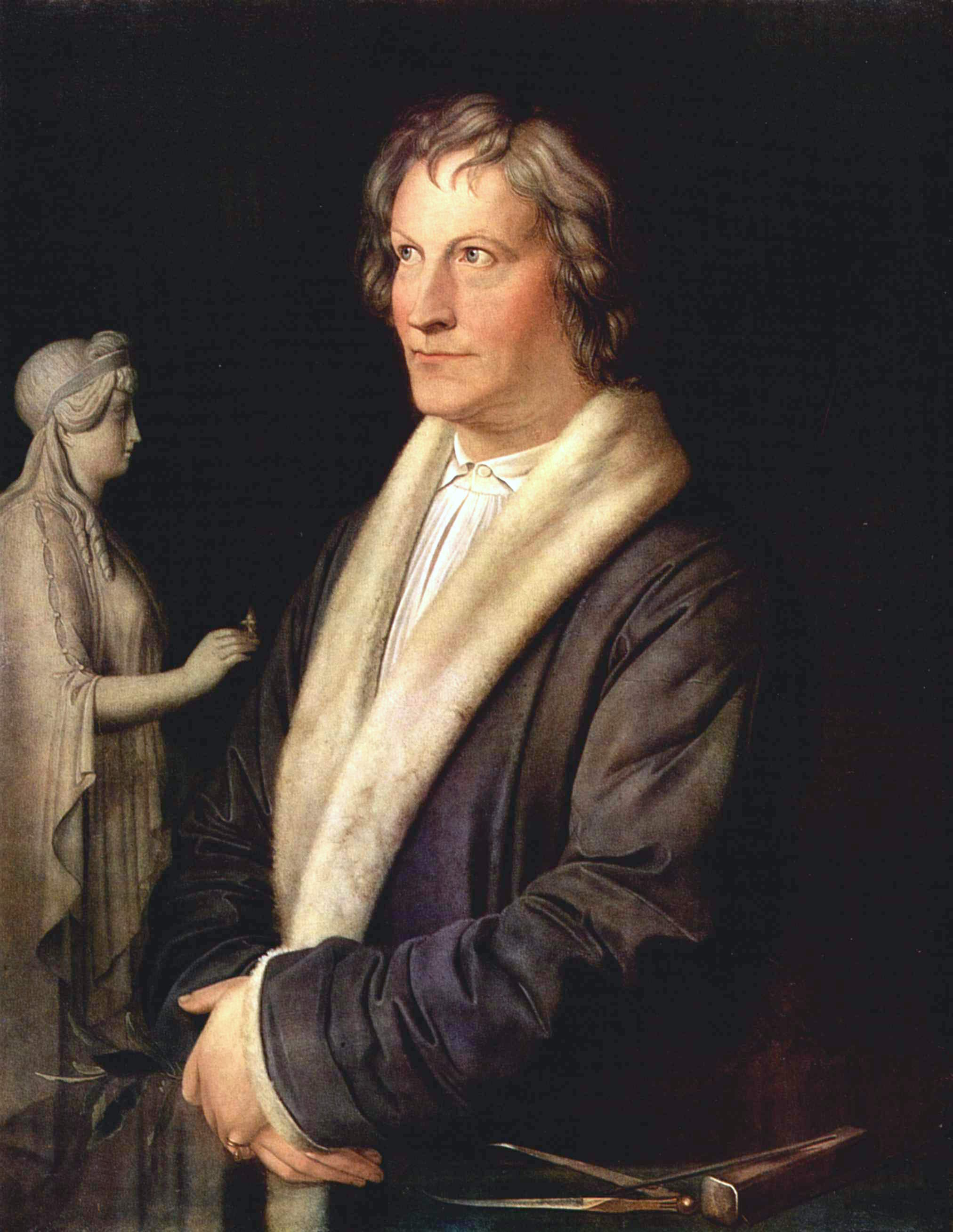
Bertel Thorvaldsen

=== January–March ===
- 26 January – Lauritz Holmblad, businessman (died 1826)
- 2 March – Johan Ernst Hartmann, organist and composer (died 1844)
- 6 March – Jens Wilken Hornemann, botanist (died 1841)

=== July–September ===
- 11 July – Hans Severin Holten, zoological writer and Geheimrat, (died 1805)
- 20 July – Hans Munk, physician (died 1848)
- 16 August – Westye Egeberg, businessman (died 1830 in Norway)
- 29 September – Jacob Holm, industrialist, ship owner and ship builder (died 1845)

=== October–December ===
- 2 September – Christian Cornelius Lerche, landowner and county governor (died 1852)
- 18 September – Frederik Hoppe, landowner (died 1837)
- 7 November – Margaret Hartman Markoe Bache, editor (died 1838 in the United States)
- 8 November – Margaret Hartman Markoe Bache, Philadelphia-based printer and editor (died 1836 in the United States)
- 11 November – Christopher Schøller Bülow, landowner and county governor (died 1830 in Germany)
- 19 November – Bertel Thorvaldsen, sculptor (died 1844)

== Deaths ==
- 27 May – Queen Sophia Magdalene, queen of Denmark (born 1700)
- 18 July – Frederik Danneskiold-Samsøe, admiral, government minister and landowner (born 1703)
- 23 September – Utilia Lenkiewitz, actress (born 1711)
- 11 October – Princess Charlotte Amalie Wilhelmine of Schleswig-Holstein-Sonderburg-Plön (born 1744 in Germany)
