= 1713 in Denmark =

- Decades: 1690s; 1700s; 1710s; 1720s; 1730s
- See also: Other events of 1713; List of years in Denmark

Events from the year 1713 in Denmark.

== Incumbents ==
- Monarch – Frederick IV
- Grand Chancellor – Christian Christophersen Sehested

== Events ==
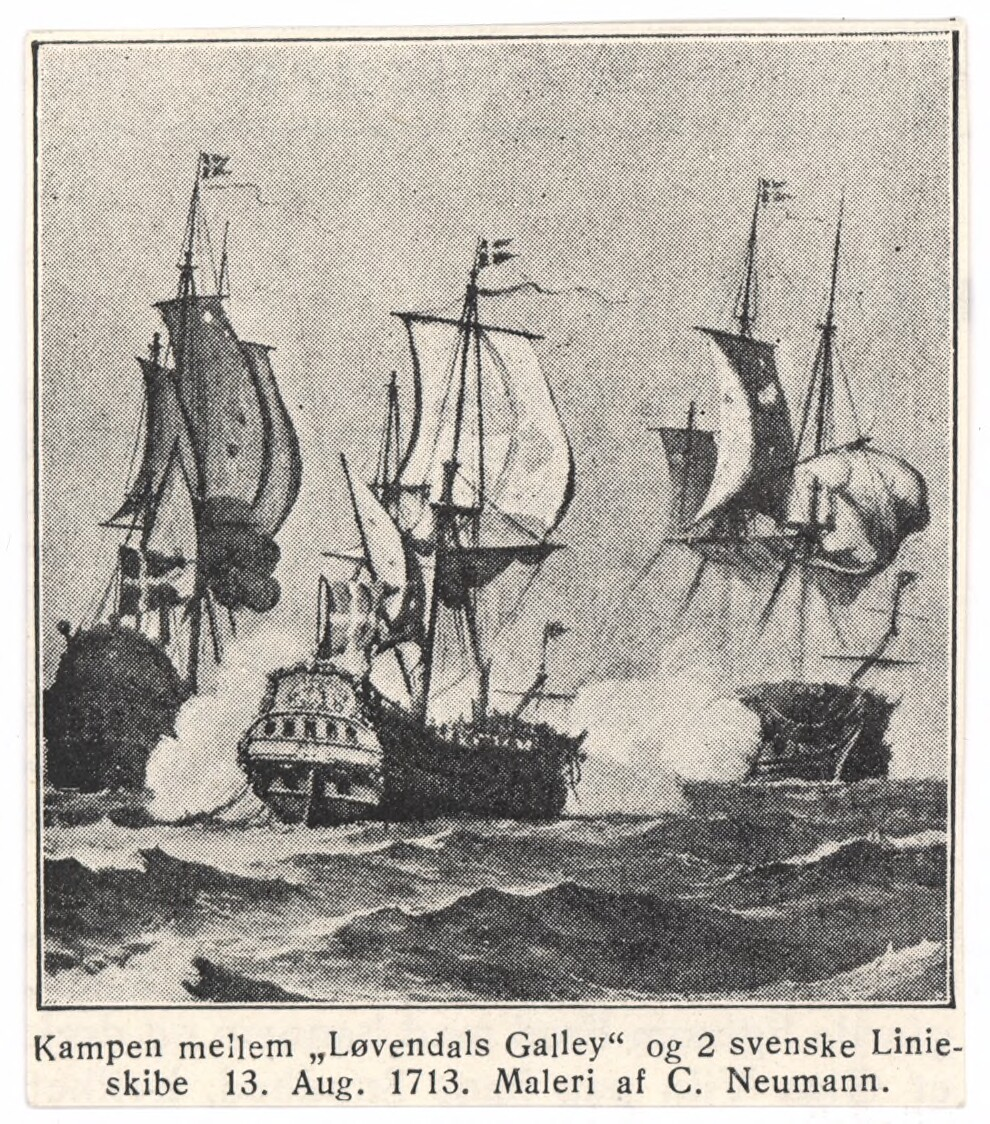
13 August: The battle action "øvendal's Galley" and two Swedish ships of the line

- 13 August – Action between a gallay commanded by Løvendal and two Swedish ships of the line.

=== Undated ===
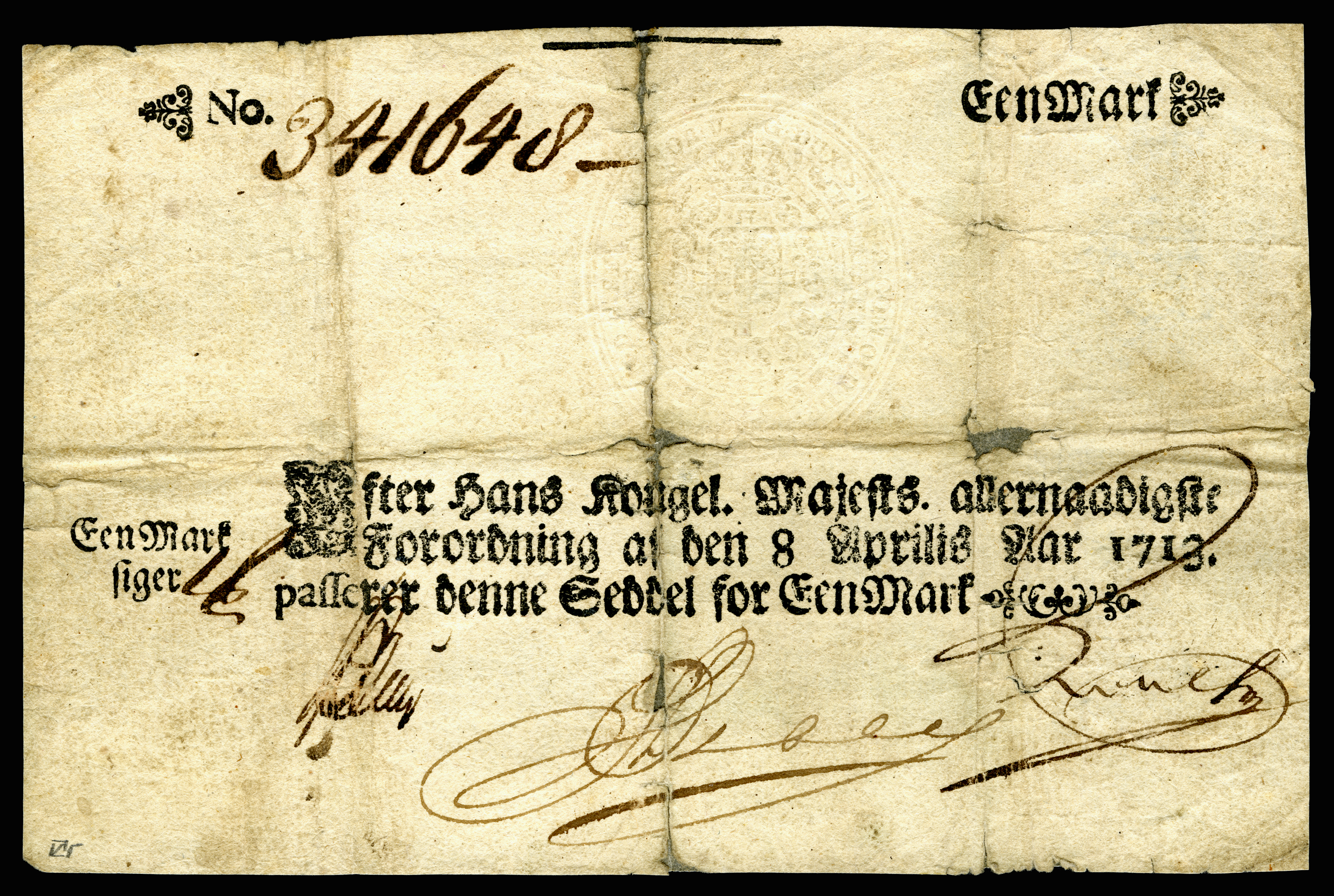
One Danish Mark (1/6 of a rigsdaler) printed in 1713, the first year of issue for paper currency in Denmark. (Note: The first issue of Danish paper currency was by the decree of 8 April 1713. Note were issued in four groups. The second and third groups were a combination of Rigsdalers and Marks where one Rigsdaler equaled six Marks.)

- Two separate systems are introduced with courant and species, with courant being a debased currency also used for banknote issue.
- Bank notes are issued for the first time.
- The Royal Danish Military Academy (Landkadetakademiet) is founded by request of Frederick IV on inspiration from the Naval Academy.
- The Prøvestenen Battery is established in Copenhagen.
- The County of Vallø is established by Frederick IV for Queen Anne Sophie Reventlow,

== Births ==
- 10 August – Christian Fleischer, civil servant (died 1768)

=== Full date missing ===
- Johannes Erasmus Iversen, composer (died 1755)

== Deaths ==
- 29 March – Christian Thomsen Carl, naval officer (born 1676)

=== Full date unknown ===
- Ernst Brandenburger, master builder (year of birth unknown)
