= 1709 in Denmark =

- Decades: 1680s; 1690s; 1700s; 1710s; 1720s
- See also: Other events of 1709; List of years in Denmark

Events from the year 1709 in Denmark.

== Incumbents ==
- Monarch – Frederick IV
- Grand Chancellor – Christian Christophersen Sehested

== Events ==
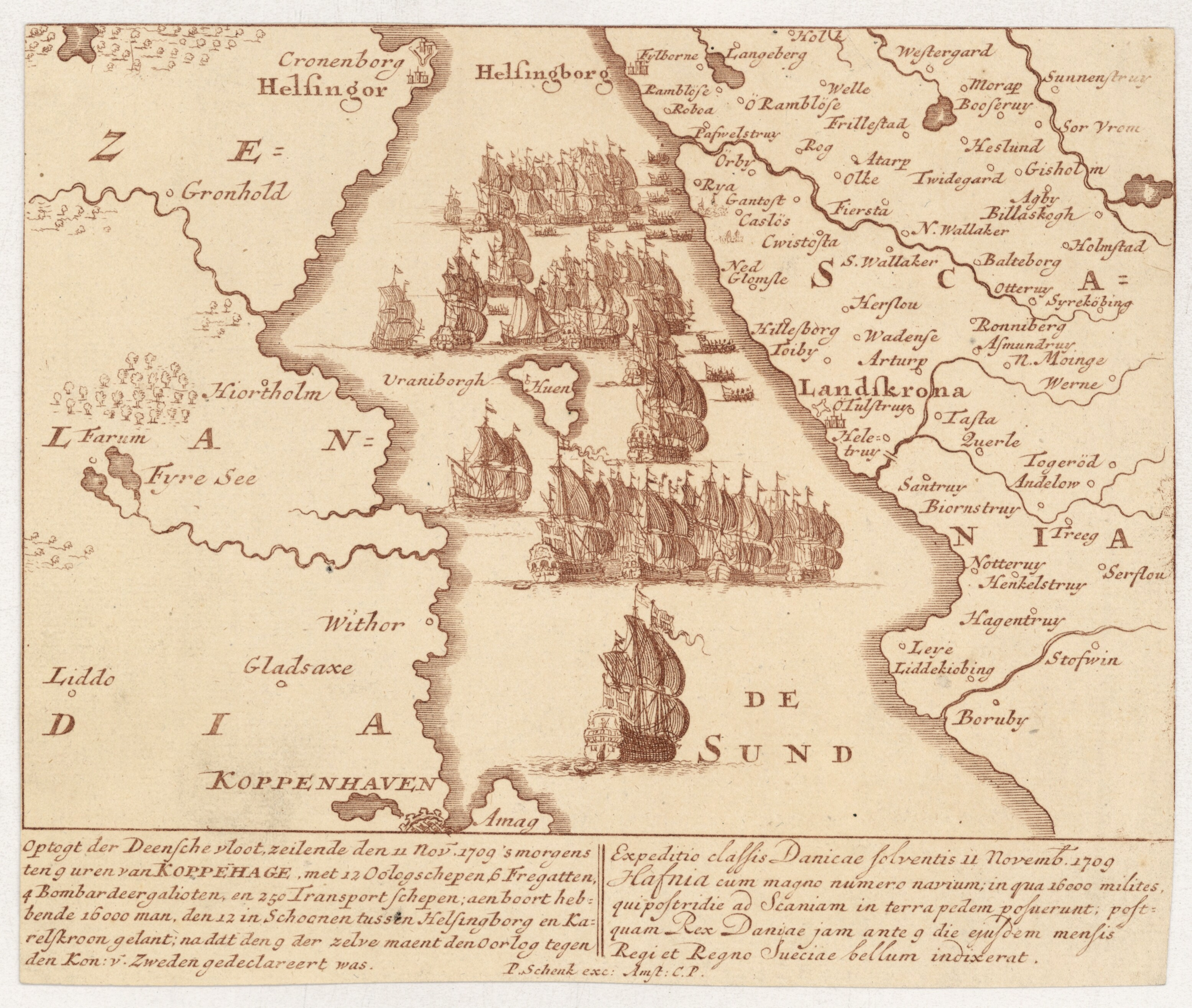
111 November: Optogt der Deensche yloot zeilende den 11 nov, 1709's morgens ten g uren van Koppehage.

- 28 June – The Treaty of Dresden renews the alliance between Denmark–Norway and Augustus II the Strong against Sweden.
- 22 October – The Treaty of Copenhagen renews the alliance between the Russian Empire and Denmark–Norway after it had been destroyed in 1700 with the Peace of Travendal. Denmark–Norway re-enters the Great Northern War as a result.
- 12 December – The Danish frigate Maagen (1694) is scuttled in the Bay of Danzig (Gdańsk) following an encounter with the Swedish frigate Falken (1703), captained by Johan Casper Printz.

== Births ==
- 16 August – Ludvig Harboe, theologian and bishop (died 1783)
- 24 September – Christiane Henriette Louise Juel, courtier (died 1756)

Full date missing

- Johann Gottfried Rosenberg, architect (died 1776)
- Johan Christian Conradi, architect (died 1779)

== Deaths ==
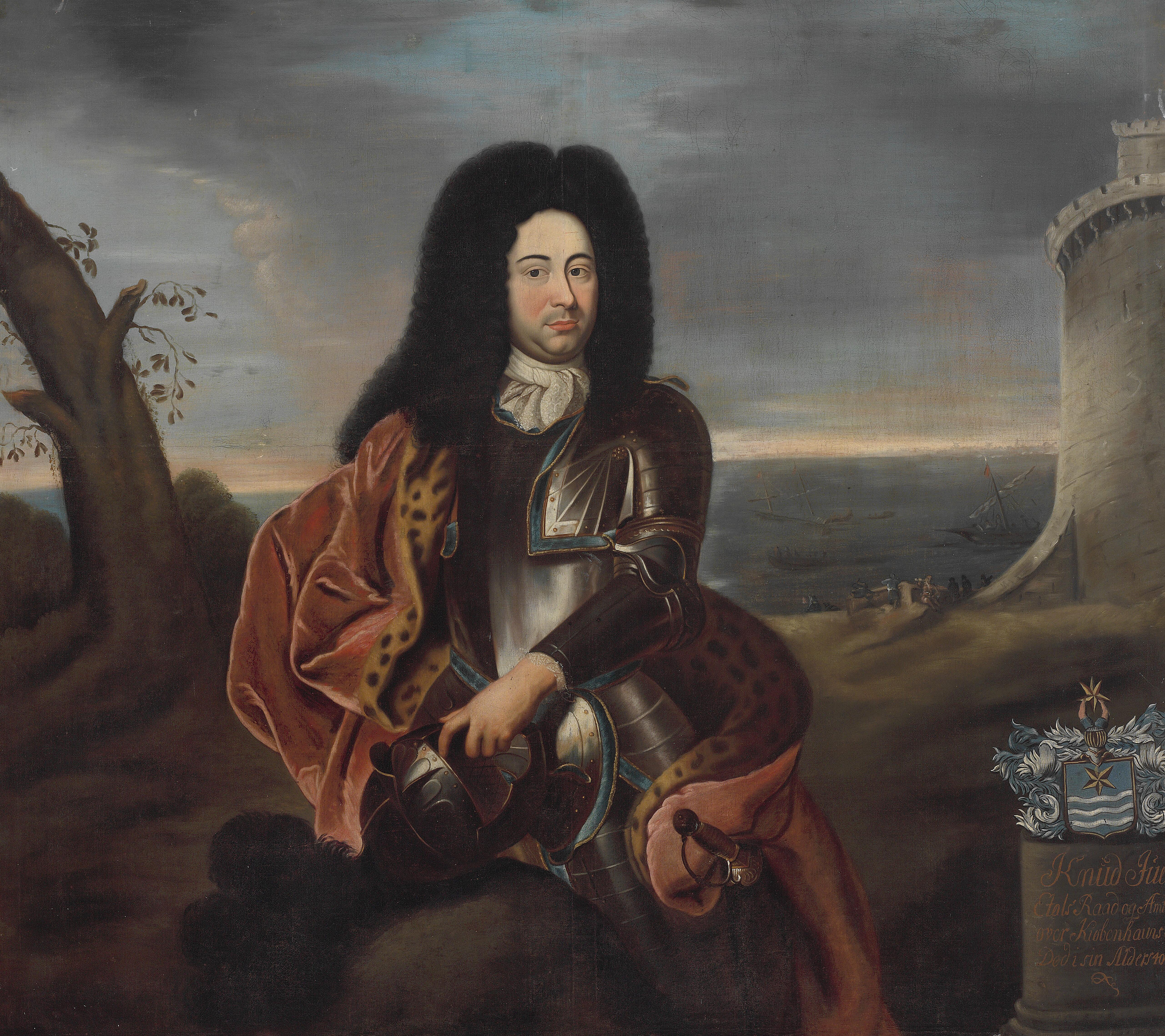
Knud Juel.

- 10 January – Knud Juel, landowner and county governor (born 1665)
- 14 September – Christian Frederik Bielke, military officer (born 1670)
- 20 September – Hector Gottfried Masius, clergy and landowner (born 1653 in Mecklenburg)
- 17 October – Vibeke Jensdatter, merchant (born 1638)

== Publication ==
- Lex Regia
