= 1711 in Denmark =

- Decades: 1690s; 1700s; 1710s; 1720s; 1730s
- See also: Other events of 1711; List of years in Denmark

Events from the year 1711 in Denmark.

== Incumbents ==
- Monarch – Frederick IV
- Grand Chancellor – Christian Christophersen Sehested

== Events ==
- January – An outbreak of plaque his Helsingør.
- May 25 – Helsingør is put under military blockade to prevent an outbreak of plague from spreading to Copenhagen. A total of 1,809, about one third of Helsingør's population, are killed by the disease in 1711. The efforts to keep the disease from spreading fail and a total of 40,000 people in Copenhagen and northern Zealand are killed by the disease during the outbreak. The blockade of Helsingør is not lifted until 25 July 1712.

=== Undated ===
- The short-lived County of Friderichsholm is established by Frederick IV for his mistress Charlotte Helene von Schindel from the manors of Næsbyholm and Bavelse but dissolved again in 1716.

== Births ==
- 7 April – Daniel Ernst Bille, naval officer (died 1790)
- 14 August – Marcus Fredrik Bang, bishop (died 1759 in Norway)

=== Date unknown ===
- Frederik Barfred, wine merchant (died 1794)
- Utilia Lenkiewitz, actress (died 1770)

== Deaths ==
- 17 May – Johann Gottfried Becker, pharmacist (born 1639)

=== Date unknown ===
- Cille Gad, poet and culture personality (born 1675)
