= 1769 in Denmark =

- Decades: 1740s; 1750s; 1760s; 1770s; 1780s
- See also: Other events of 1769; List of years in Denmark

Events from the year 1769 in Denmark.

== Incumbents ==
- Monarch – Christian VII
- Prime minister – Count Johann Hartwig Ernst von Bernstorff

== Events ==
January

- 29 January – The Royal Danish Agricultural Society is founded.

August

- 15 August – The first census in Denmark-Norway to attempt completely covering all citizens (including women and children who had previously been listed only as numbers) takes place. At that point, Norway included, there 797,584 citizens in Denmark.

September

- 14 September – The outbreak of the Danish-Algerian War.
- 18– – The island of Møn is divided into estates and sold at public auction in Stege.
  - Estate No. 1 (Nygård, later Marienborg) is sold to quartermaster Esaias Fleischer for r 40,550 rigsdaler.
  - Estate No. 2 (Fanegjord) is sold to the local farmers for 42,750 rigsdaler.
  - Estate No. 3 (Sønderskov) is sold to the local farmers for 30,450 rigsdaler.
  - Rstate No. 4 (Nordfeld) is sold to local farmers for 41,650 rigsdaler.
  - Estate No. 5 (Klintholm) is sold to Hans Tersling for 50,000 rigsdaler.
  - Ålebækgård is sold to Ålebækgårdskoven,
  - Sømarke and the northern part of Klinteskoven (now Liselund) were sold to Mathias Schmidt.

=== Undated ===
- – Thomas Potter, a Scottish emigrant, establishes the first iron foundry in Denmark at Applebys Plads in Christianshavn, Copenhagen.

== Culture ==
=== Art ===
- Ulrich Ferdinand Beenfeldt cmpletes the Fenger family portrait.
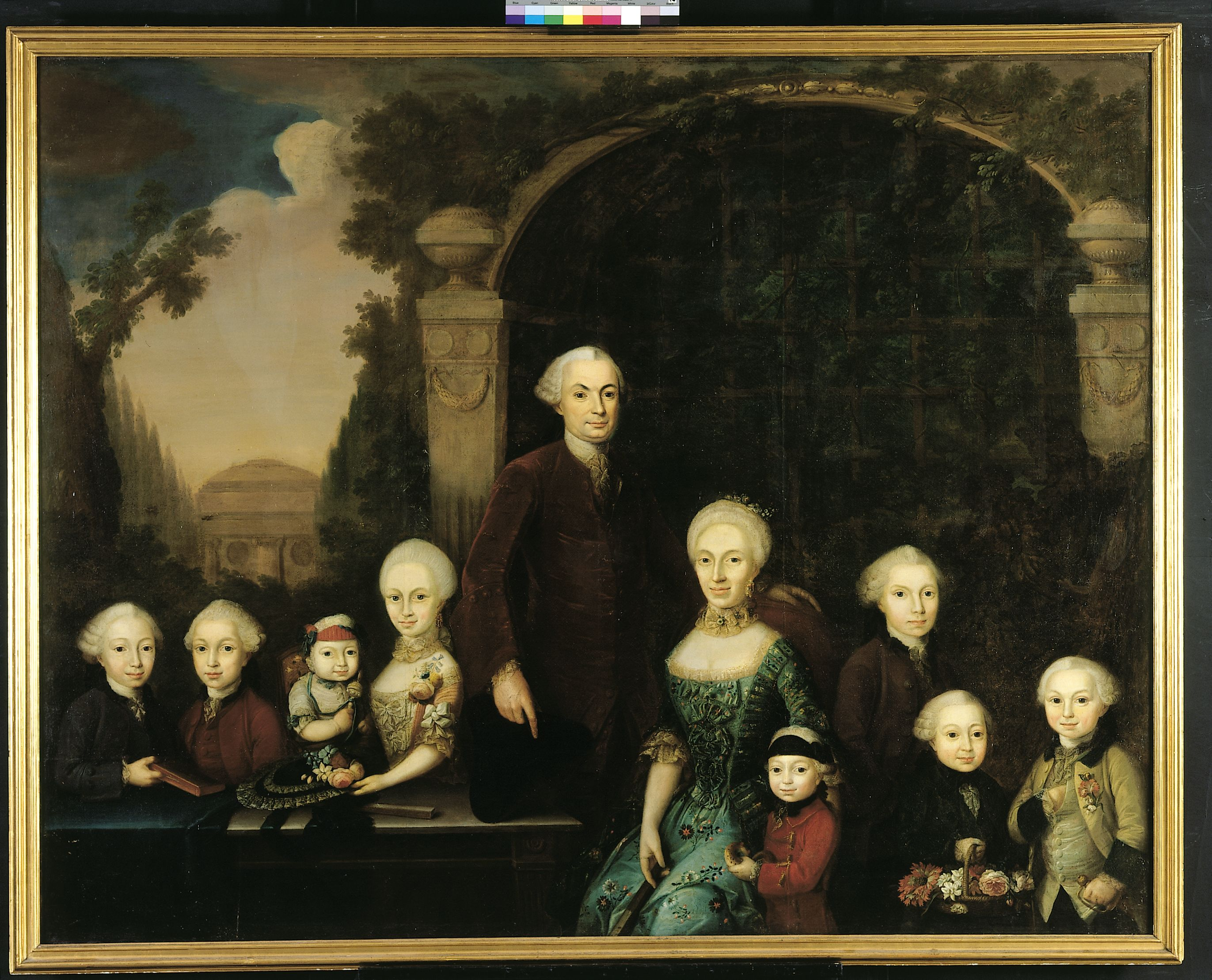
The Fenger family portrait.

== Births ==
=== January–March ===
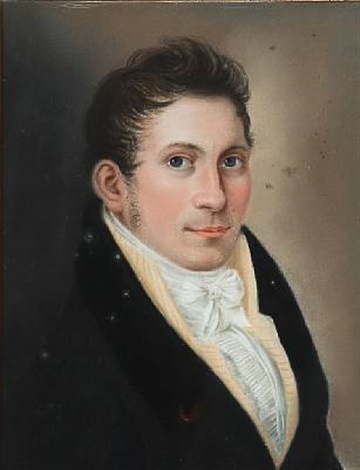
Hans Hansen.

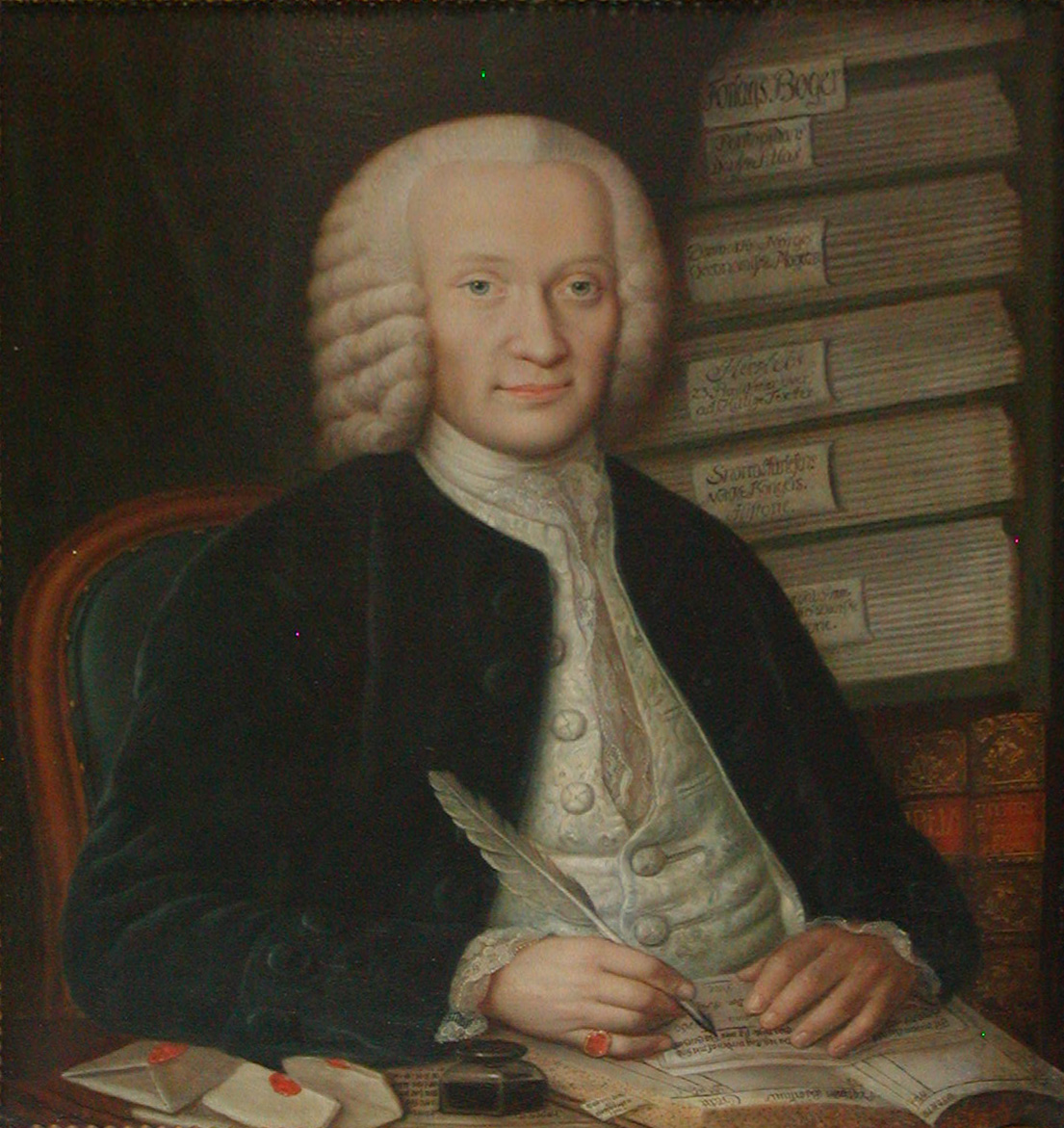
Andreas Hartvig Godiche.

- 22 February – Hans Hansen, portrait painter (died 1828)
- 23 March – Frederik Christian Raben, count, traveller and amateur naturalist (died 1838)
- 28 March – Schack von Staffeldt, author (died 1826)

=== April–June ===
- 3 April – Christian Günther von Bernstorff, statesman and landowner (died 1865))
- 3 June – Ludvig Manthey, pharmacist, businessman and landowner (died 1842)

=== Kily–September ===
- 24 July – Peter Johansen Neergaard, landowner (died 1835)
- 31 July – Carl Gottlob Rafn, physician (died 1808)
- 4 August – Andreas Hartvig Godiche, publisher and printer (died 1714)
- 17 September – Stephan Heger, actor and writer (died 1855)

=== October–December ===
- 8 November – Michael Johannes Petronius Bille, naval officer (died 1845)

== Deaths ==
- 29 January – Johan Ludvig Holstein, politician and landowner (born 1694 in Mecklenburg)
- 3 April – Christian Gotlob Mengel, publisher (born 1716(
- 4 November – Andreas Brünniche, painter (born 1704)
- 1 December – Villum Berregaardm government official and Supreme Court justice (norn 1717)

=== Full date missing ===
- Birgitte Sofie Gabel, noble and courtier (born 1746)
