= 1716 in Denmark =

- Decades: 1690s; 1700s; 1710s; 1720s; 1730s
- See also: Other events of 1716; List of years in Denmark

Events from the year 1716 in Denmark.

== Incumbents ==
- Monarch – Frederick IV
- Grand Chancellor – Christian Christophersen Sehested

== Events ==
- 8 March – The Battle of Høland.

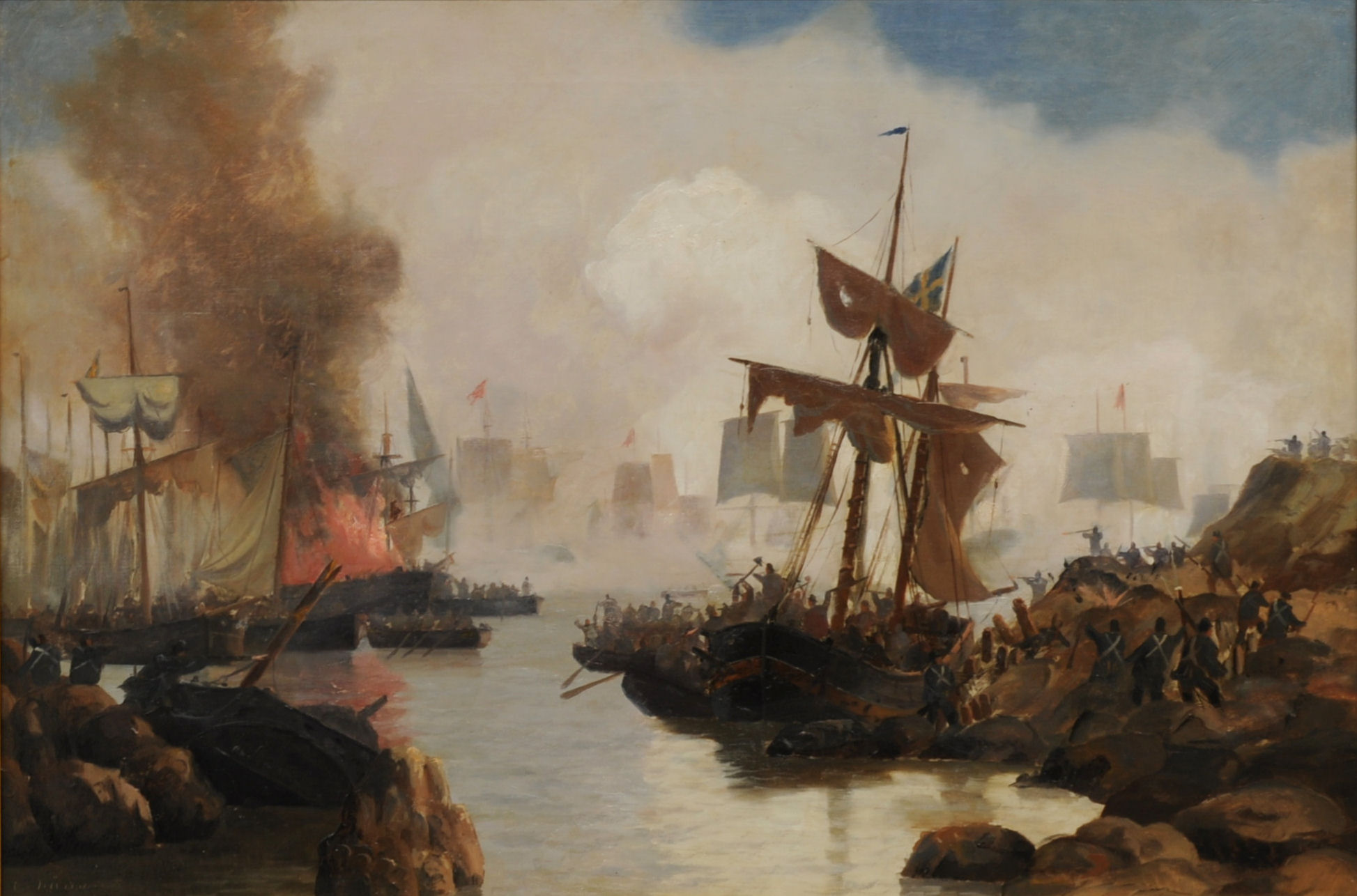
8 July: The Battle of Dynekilen.

- 8 July – Battle of Dynekilen, battle of the Great Northern War.
- 3 August – Martin Düssel and Christoffer Düssel are ennobled with letters patent under the name “von Falkenskiold”, founding the noble House of Falkenskiold.

=== Undated ===
- Peter the Great visits Copenhagen. He ascends the Round Tower on horseback while visiting Copenhagen. His wife, Catherine I, reportedly ascended behind him in a carriage.
- Johan Ludvig Holstein settles as a courtier and government official in Denmark.

== Births ==
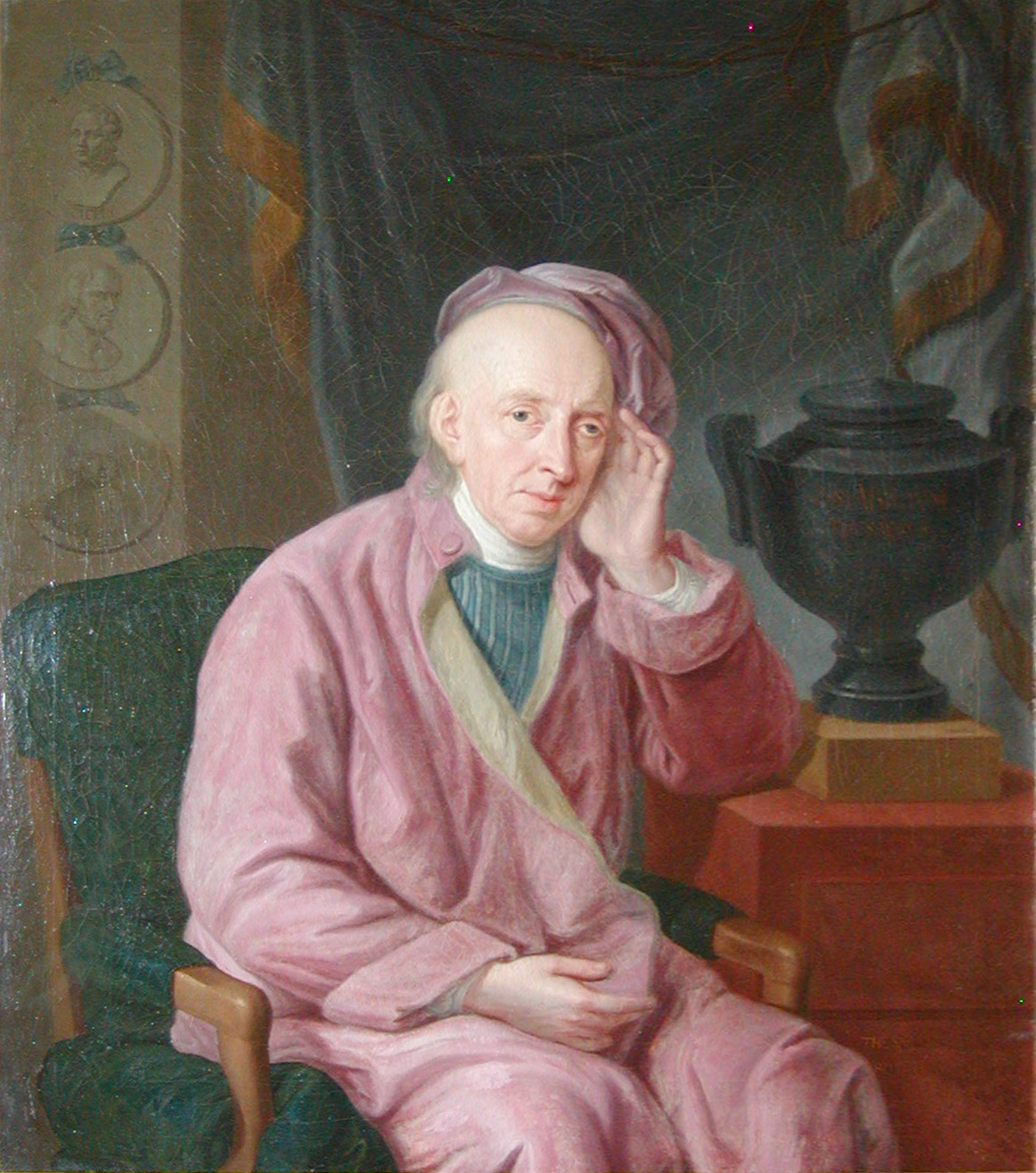
Bolle Willum Luxdorph.

- 10 January – Christian Siegfried Scheel von Plessen, army officer, county governor and landowner (died 1755)
- 24 July – Bolle Willum Luxdorph, government official and landowner (died 1788)

=== Full date missing ===
- Peder Olsen Walløe, arctic explorer (died 1793)
- Johann Georg Ziesenis, painter (died 1776)

== Deaths ==
- 8 August – Mikkel Knudsen Crone. colonial administrator (born unknown year)
