= 1710 in Denmark =

- Decades: 1690s; 1700s; 1710s; 1720s; 1730s
- See also: Other events of 1710; List of years in Denmark

Events from the year 1710 in Denmark.

== Incumbents ==
- Monarch – Frederick IV
- Grand Chancellor – Christian Christophersen Sehested

== Events ==
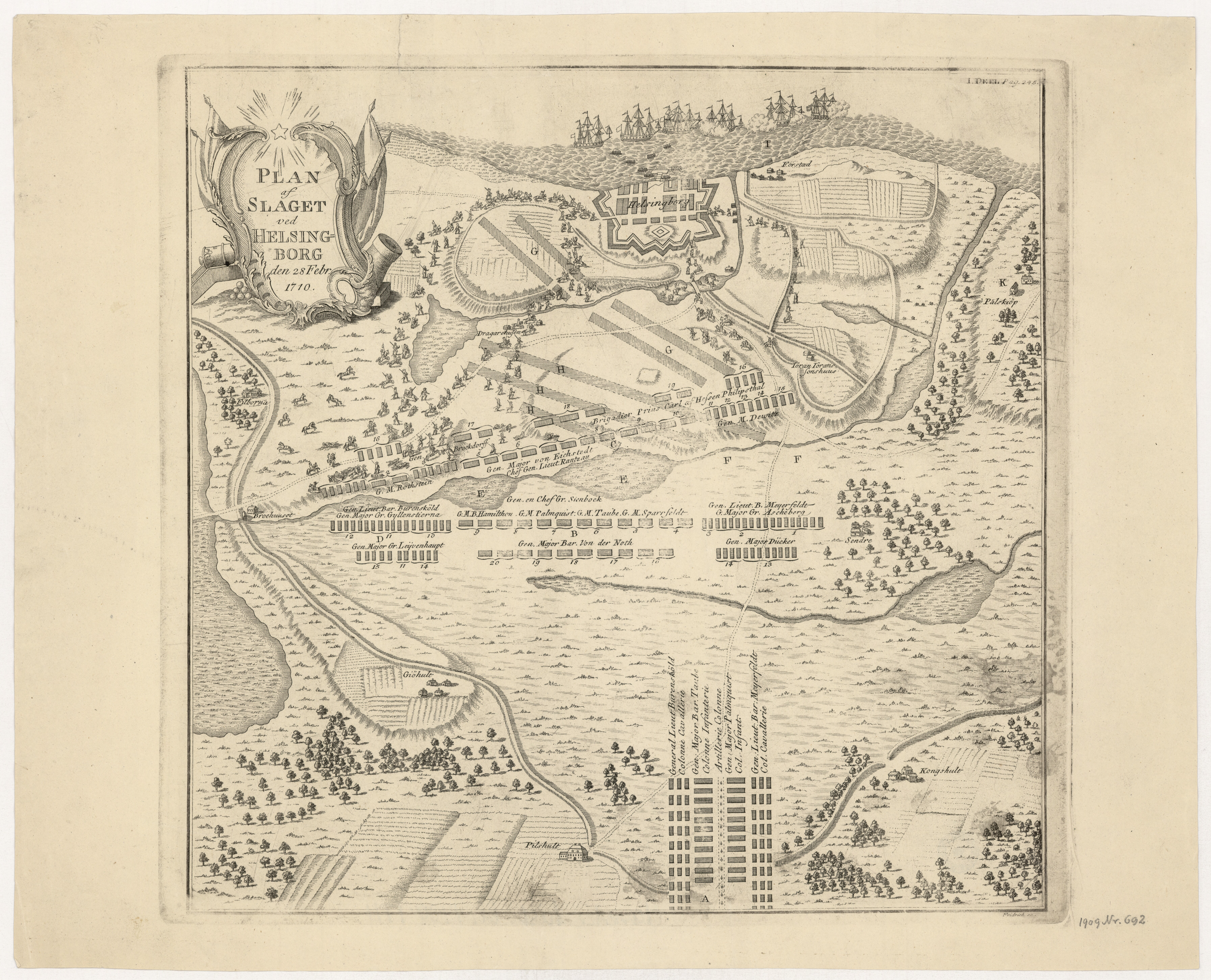
19 March: The Battle of Helsingborg.

- 10 March – The Battle of Helsingborg.
- 4 October – The Dannebroge explodes and sinks at the Battle of Køge Bay, almost all of its crew of 600 are killed.
- 26 November – The Battle of Wismar.

=== Undated ===
- Ladegården is converted into a military hospital.

== Births ==
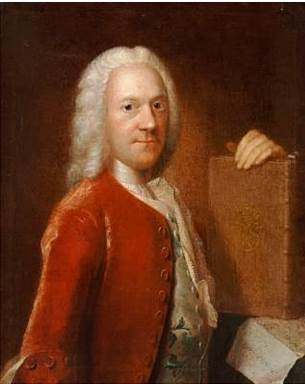
Jakob Langebek.

- 23 January – Jakob Langebek, historian (died 1775)
- 10 March – Christian Ditlev Reventlow, Privy Councillor and nobleman (died 1775)
- 10 November – Adam Gottlob von Moltke, courtier and diplomat (died 1792)
- 27 August – Christopher Fabritius, goldsmith (died 1787)
- 17 December – Alexander Walker Ross, military officer (died 1792)

Full date missing

- Catarina Gustmeyer, businessperson

== Deaths ==
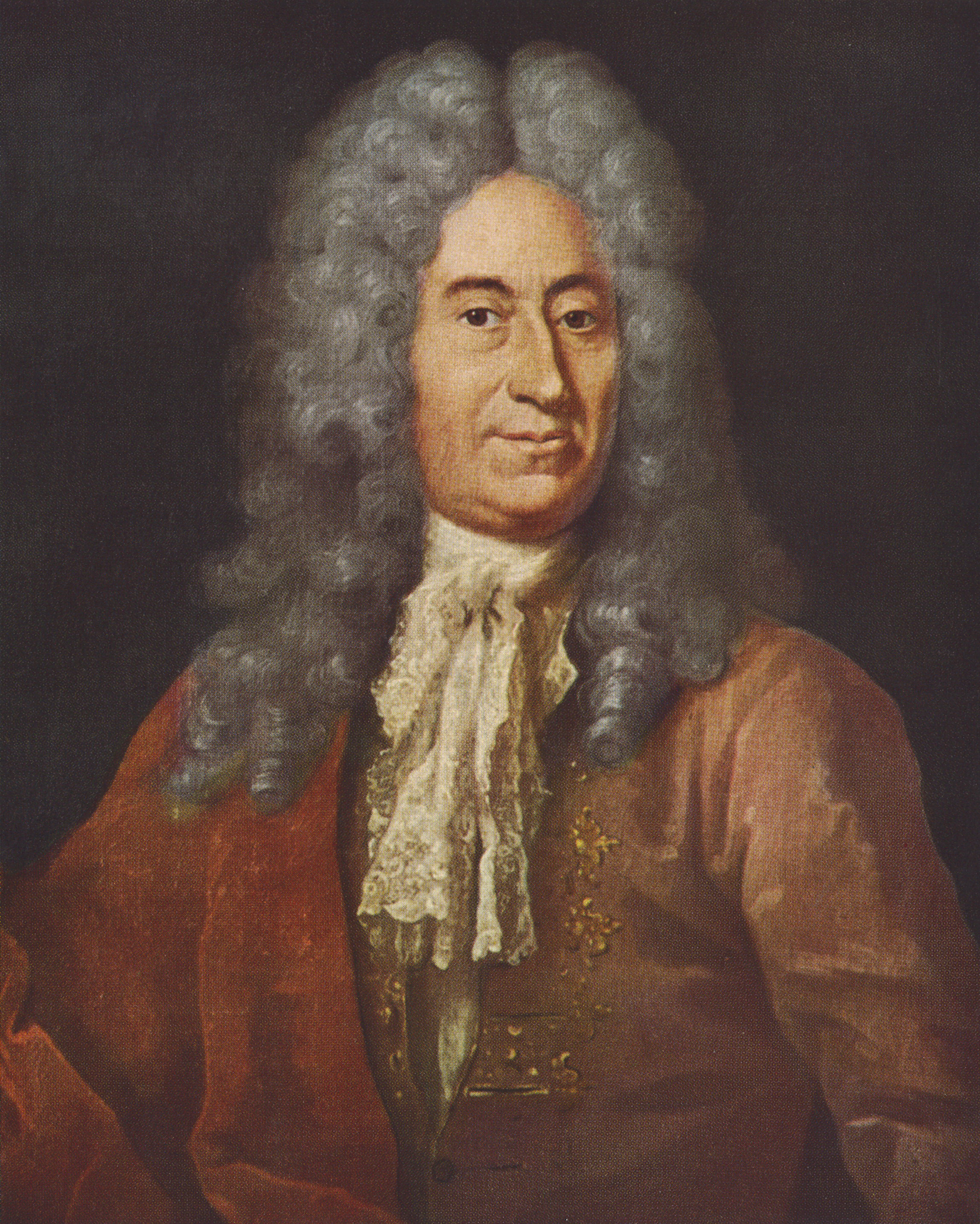
Ole Rømer.

- 19 September – Ole Rømer, astronomer (born 1644)
- 31 December – Henrik Bornemann, clergyman and theologian (born 1646)

Ø 4 October – Iver Huitfeldt, naval officer (born 1665 in Denmark)

- 31 December – Henrik Borneman, bishop (born 1646)
