= 1715 in Denmark =

- Decades: 1690s; 1700s; 1710s; 1720s; 1730s
- See also: Other events of 1715; List of years in Denmark

Events from the year 1715 in Denmark.

== Incumbents ==
- Monarch – Frederick IV
- Grand Chancellor – Christian Christophersen Sehested

== Events ==
April

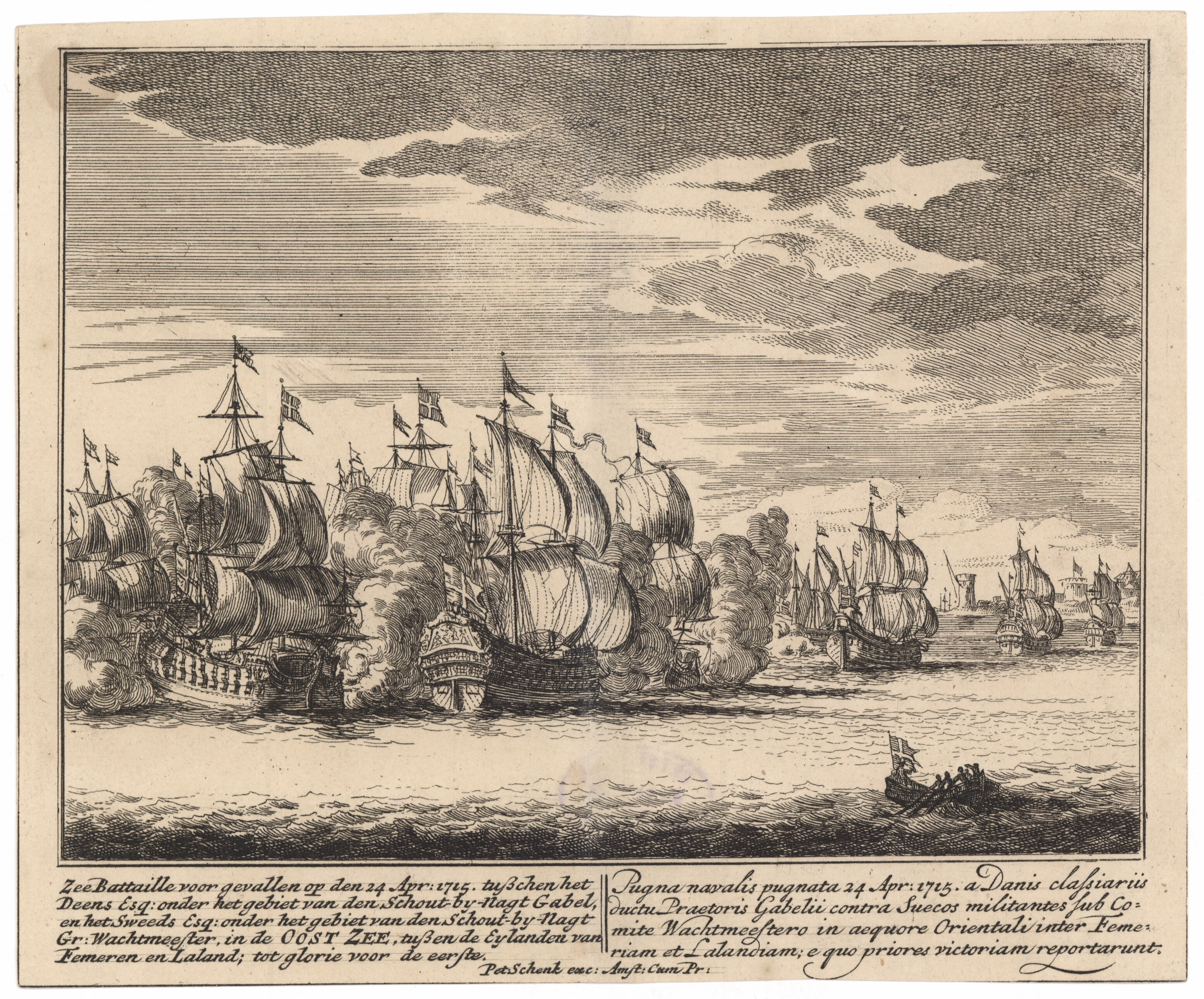
24 April: The Battle of Fehmarn.

- 12 April – The Danish frigate Ørnen (1694) is captured off Dornbusch by the Swedish frigate Vita Örn (1711) under Johan Casper Printz.
- 24 April – Battle of Fehmarn, naval battle of the Great Northern War.

May

- 2 May – The Treaty of Berlin.

August

- 8 August – Battle of Rügen, naval battle of the Great Northern War.

December

- 24 December – Denmark's Siege of Stralsund ends.

== Births ==
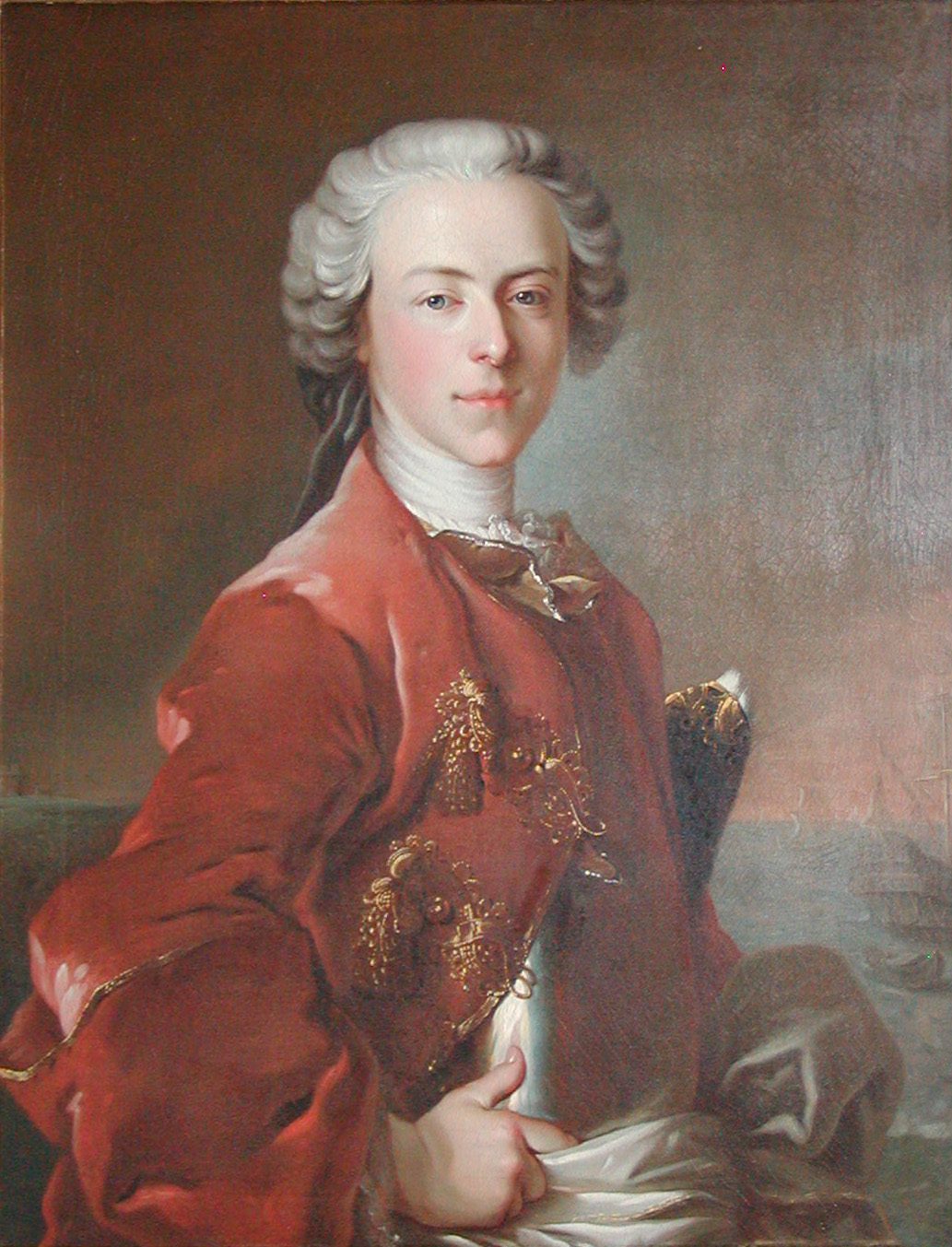
Frederik de Løvenørn.

- 6 January – Frederik de Løvenørn, county governor and landowner(died 1779)
- 19 January – Bartholomæus Bertelsen de Cederfeld, county governor (died 1783)
- 4 March – Joachim Melchior Magens, colonial administrator and planter (died 1783)
- 30 November – Johan Jacob Bruun, painter (died 1789)

== Deaths ==
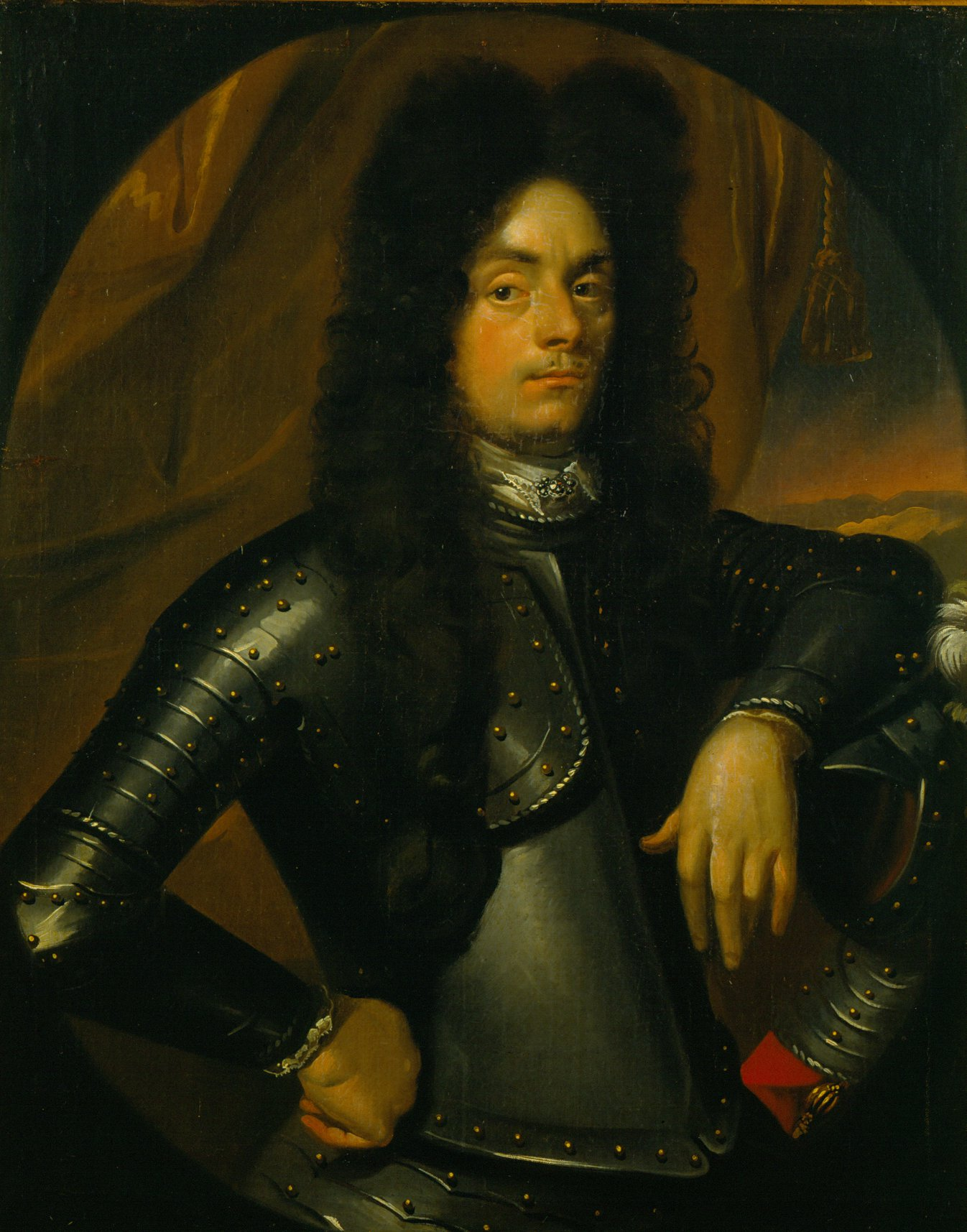
Just Juel.

- 8 August – Just Juel, naval officer (born 1664)
- 11 November – Jens Rostgaard, civil servant, judge and antiquarian (born 1650)
- 16 November – Jacques d'Agar, painter (born 1640)
