= 1708 in Denmark =

- Decades: 1680s; 1690s; 1700s; 1710s; 1720s
- See also: Other events of 1708; List of years in Denmark

Events from the year 1708 in Denmark.

== Incumbents ==
- Monarch – Frederick IV
- Grand Chancellor – Conrad von Reventlow (until 21 July), Christian Christophersen Sehested

== Events ==
- 1 January – The County of Golsteinsborg is established by Ulrik Adolf Holstein from the manors of Holsteinborg, Snedinge and Fuirendal.

=== Undated ===
- 1708-09 – Frederick IV visits Italy.
- Johann Gottfried Becker passes the Royal Court Pharmacy in Copenhagen on to his son Gottfried Becker.
- Hans Peter Pelt obtains a license to establish Copenhagen's second sugar refinery.

== Births ==
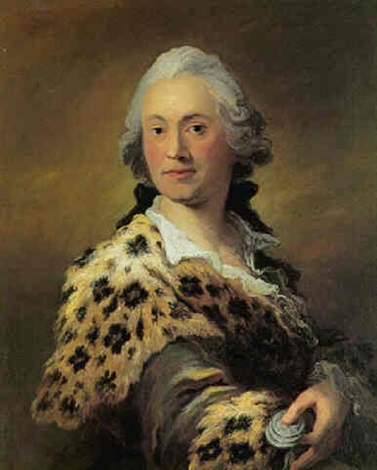
Peter Christian Winsløw.

- 7 January – Frederik Horn, chief of police in Copenhagen and president of Hof- og Stadsretten (died 1781)
- 22 March – Ernst Henrich Berling, publisher, founder of Berlingske (died 1750)
- 24 June – Peter Otto Rosenørn, county governor (died 1751)
- 22 October – Frederic Louis Norden, naval captain and explorer (died 1742)

=== Full date missing ===
- Peter Christian Winsløw, medal engraver (died c. 1756)

== Deaths ==
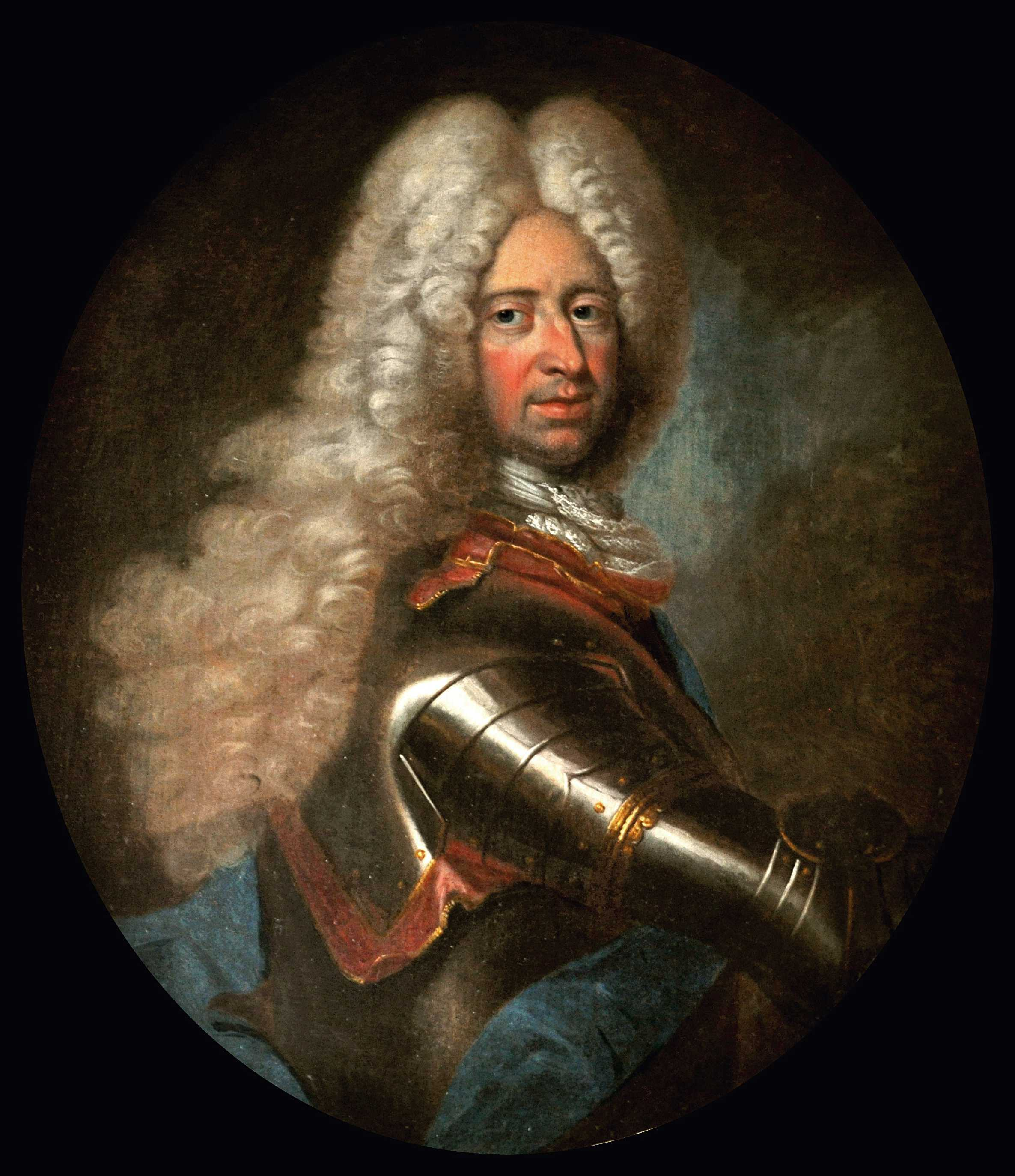
Conrad von Reventlow.

- 21 July – Conrad von Reventlow, statesman, Grand Chancellor of Denmark (born 1644)
- 21 June – Frederik Gabel, statesman (born 1645 in Bremen)
- 21 December – Joachim Melchior von Holten, colonial administrator (born 1671)
