= Christian Thomsen Carl =

Royal Dano-Norwegian Navy officer

Christian Thomsen Carl (1676 – 29 March 1713) was a Royal Dano-Norwegian Navy officer. He is known not only for his military career, but also for saving the town council's archives in Greifswald as well as the whole town of Anklam from being burned during the Great Northern War.

== Biography ==
=== Family ===
Christian Thomsen Carl was born in 1676 in Assens on the Danish isle of Funen as the son of Helvig Jensdatter (†1717) and Thomas Iversen, also spelled Iffversen. Carl's father was a wagoner and owned a ferry, then a typical reward for former naval officers; on 5 October 1665 he had received the privilege to maintain a ferry from Frederick III of Denmark. Iffversen on 28 November 1667 received another privilege granting him the right to maintain an inn in Assens, where he became a member of the town's council on 25 November 1673 and a mayor from 13 December 1682 to 1694. According to Johan Henrik Lützow,^{(da.wiki)} Carl's father died in 1698, while Max Sander says he died between 1699 and 1702.

According to Lützow, Christian Thomsen Carl married twice, both times in Copenhagen's naval Church of Holmen, and both times into the Klaumann family: on 1 June 1702, he married Dorothea Klaumann (*~1675 in Copenhagen, †1704), daughter of Peter Klaumann (*~1635, †1710) and Eleonora Theresa Dulieu (†1679); and on 19 February 1706 he married Mechtilde Magdalene Klaumann (*in or before 1682, †1711), daughter of Nicolaj Klaumann (*~1646, †1707) and Apolonia Jensdatter Snistorph (†1733).

Sander however, with reference to the rigsarkivet, reports similar names but in a different setting. According to Sander, Carl married Megtilde Magdalene Klaumann on 1 June 1702, and with her he had at least the following children:

- Peter Klaumann Carl (*~1703/5, †17 September 1770), captain commander,
- Thoma Hedewig (*1706)
- Apelone Sophie (Maria) (*1707, †1709)
- Nikolai Klaumann (*1709, †1709)
- Megtele Dorothea (*1711, †13 May 1711)

Sander says that after Christian Thomsen Carl's death, one of his sisters and his son Peter Klaumann Carl were still alive; the sister had married Assens' mayor Lauge Hansen. Based on Hansen's correspondence, Sander says that the abovementioned privilege to maintain a ferry - which Christian Thomsen Carl had inherited from his father - was desired by Hausen, because of his marriage, as well as Peter Klaumann Carl; the former received the privilege in turn for an annual payment of 120 rigsdaler to the latter.

In the Personalhistorisk Tidsskrift^{(da.wiki)} of 1920, there are entries for two marriages, in 1702 and 1706, by Carl and the respective Klaumann family members similar to Lützow's report.

=== Career ===
After apprenticeship in Denmark, Christian Thomsen Carl on 17 January (Sander) or 28 February 1696 (Lützow) was allowed to serve in a foreign army, and began his military career in the navy of the Dutch Republic. He was promoted 2nd lieutenant on 31 December 1697. On 26 February 1698, he got permission to enter Russian service for three years, and was promoted 1st lieutenant on 30 January 1700. By then, a coalition of Denmark-Norway, Russia and Saxony had just started the Great Northern War against Sweden; Denmark dropped out in August 1700 and re-entered in June 1709.

Christian Thomsen Carl served on the Danish vessel Dronning Charlotte Amalie and on 26 April 1701 entered the new naval cadet company as a lieutenant. In 1704, he served on the vessel Prins Carl, and was promoted captain lieutenant on 31 January 1705. After serving on the yacht Kronen and the vessel Swærdfisken, he asked for graduation from the naval cadet company on 16 April 1708 and left the company on 30 July. According to Lützow, he was promoted to the rank of a captain on 14 April 1708; according to Sander and Hans Georg Garde^{(da.wiki)}, he was characterized captain on 24 April 1708 and actually became captain on 16 April 1709.

In 1709, Christian Thomsen Carl was sent to the Kattegat to monitor British naval maneuvers. In September 1709, he became the commander of the vessel Wenden, a flagship in the fleet of Ulrik Christian Gyldenløve, and in 1710 commanded the vessel Delmenhorst. He took part in the battle of Køge bay on 4 October 1710, and in 1711 commanded the Prins Carl. In 1712 and 1713, he commanded the vessel Ditmarsken and was put in charge of vice-admiral Christen Thomesen Sehested's Pomeranian fleet during his absence. Carl took part in the action of 21–23 June 1712 and the action of 31 July 1712. In early 1713, he had established his headquarters in the sconce of Swedish Pomeranian Wieck near Greifswald, occupied by the allies of the anti-Swedish coalition. According to Sander and Garde, his rank was that of a captain commander on 6 June 1710, and that of a commander on 17 December 1712.

=== Achievements and death in Pomerania ===
When Christian Thomsen Carl was in Wieck, nearby Greifswald was a front town commanded by the marquis de Saisan (actually Monsieur de Villenouvette, Comte de Saissan), a Frenchman in Saxon service. The Saxons had occupied Greifswald on 31 August 1711, and were joined by Russian forces in January 1712; tsar Peter the Great visited the town in August. Most of Swedish Pomerania was in the hand of the allies, who besieged the remaining Swedes at Stralsund.

==== Greifswald town fire ====
On 1 March at about 10:00 pm, a fire broke out in Greifswald's stables, which were used by the Saxon horse. The marquis de Saisan alleged a conspiracy of Greifswald's burghers against the occupation forces. He ordered the Greifswalders near the stables to be dislodged, and had the streets leading to the site fenced off by his troops. The situation was precarious as the town's arsenal near the fire site, holding large amounts of gunpowder, threatened to destroy much of the town when it blew up. When the fire had already encroached on the roofs of several houses, including the town hall, the marquis discarded the conspiracy theory and allowed the Greifswalders to extinguish the fire. They were however unable to do so effectively, as their fire fighting devices had been damaged by the occupation forces.

Christian Thomsen Carl decided to help, bringing with him his crewmen and fire fighting devices. Carl ordered his crew to approach Greifswald at a run from their quarters in Wieck, located about 5 kilometres (3.1 mi) east of the town. While much of the town hall and 36 houses burned down, the fire was extinguished before it reached the basements containing the council's archive. The documents had been retrieved from the burning house by Carl's crewmen during the operations. Afterwards, the town awarded the crewmen an "Ohm" of brandy, containing about 150 litres (40 US gal).

==== Rescue of Anklam ====
Other Swedish Pomeranian towns were ordered by tsar Peter the Great to be systematically burned down. This order was issued on 16 March to retaliate for the burning of Danish Altona by Swedish forces under Magnus Stenbock in January. Subsequently, Gartz and Wolgast were burned down, and Anklam was to be the next town to burn. The order was to be carried out by baron von Staff, a German in Russian service, who had already burned down Wolgast on 27 March. Also on 27 March, while encamped at Friedrichsstadt in Holstein, Menshikov on his own authority revoked the tsar's order, in turn for a contribution of 1,000 reichstalers per town spared. Menshikov's decision had been preceded by the intercedings of the marquis de Saisan and king Frederik IV of Denmark. However, since the courier from Friedrichstadt would only arrive in Greifswald on 3 April, Anklam was nevertheless scheduled for destruction, and the burning of Demmin was also announced.

Staff prepared to leave for Anklam to carry out the tsar's conflagration order, but first fought a duel with Christian Thomsen Carl on 29 March on the market square in Greifswald. In the course of the duel, Staff stabbed Carl to death, perforating the right ventricle of his heart.

In most German secondary literature, it is maintained that the duel took place because Carl called Staff a "murderous incendiary" ("Mordbrenner"); while Sander (1914) says that the primary sources retrieved by him, mostly from Denmark, do not reveal the reason for the duel - he nevertheless assumes that Carl already knew about his king's efforts in rescinding the tsar's order and that his argument with Staff was about that issue. On 24 March, Christen Thomesen Sehested actually ordered Carl to intervene - because of king Frederick IV's discontent - against the devastation of Swedish Pomerania by the Russians, but without alienating them; yet, this order arrived in Greifswald only on 30 March and was answered by the Danish captain Michael Gude, who informed Sehested about the duel and Carl's death. Lützow, who reports an "exchange of words" as the reason for the duel and also notes that Staff was the one who called Carl out, further says that the duel happened directly before Carl would have left for Denmark.

The marquis de Saisan reacted by arresting Staff, charging him with murder. Thus, the burning of Anklam was delayed. However, general major Bueck, a Mecklenburger in charge of the Russian forces in Pomerania, took over the responsibility for the burning of Anklam from Staff, rescheduling it for 3 April. The inhabitants of Anklam were ordered to leave the town on 1 April, carrying with them only two shirts each and food for four days; their houses were looted and filled with straw and tar. The action was cancelled when Menshikov's courier arrived. Staff, who in 1710 participated in the successful siege of Riga, is in 1716 attested to have camped in Grevesmühlen as general major in Repnin's army. Saissan, the French mercenary who before had fought in the War of the Spanish Succession, remained in Saxon service and in 1718 led an unsuccessful attempt to abdicate Stanislaus Leszczynski; he died in Madrid in 1728 or 1739.

=== Burial ===
Christian Thomsen Carl's body was transferred to Denmark and buried at the Church of Holmen, Copenhagen, on 6 April 1713.

== Name and focus in historiographic tradition ==
Danish and German accounts of Christian Thomsen Carl's life vary significantly in scope. While Danish accounts rely on the Danish navy's datasets and focus on Carl's career in the Danish navy, German accounts rely on reports about Carl's stay and death in Swedish Pomerania and focus on the implications of Carl's action for that region, thereby disregarding his earlier life. Carl's name is reported in a wide variety of different spellings, whereby nearly all German accounts, in contrast to most Danish accounts, do not inform about his given names, and report varieties of "Carlson" as his last name.

=== Danish tradition ===
The name "Christian Thomesen Carl" is used in a concise biographical article authored by Johan Henrik Lützow^{(da.wiki)} (1788), used as a reference for the biographies by Carl Ludvig With-Seidelin (in Bricka, ed., 1889) and Topsøe-Jensen & Marquard (1935). Lützow (*1747, †1794) was a Danish naval officer who collected and published biographies of notable Danish navy officers of his time, and in the beforementioned article outlines Carl's family background and career in condensed form. Part of Carl's family background is also documented in the Personalhistorisk Tidsskrift, where he is spelled "Christian Thomesen Carl" and "Christian Thomæsen Carl."

The Danish naval officer and naval historian Hans Georg Garde^{(da.wiki)} in 1835 presented the biography of "Christian Thomasen Carl," along with many others, in table format, noting the circumstances of his death in a footnote. The same name is used by William August Carstensen^{(da.wiki)} and Otto George Lütken (1887), who mention Carl's role in the Danish advance to Pomerania and his death. However, Garde in his 1852 naval history of Denmark-Norway mentioned Carl as "C. T. Carl" when in command of the Delmenhorst, but as "C. T. Carlsen" when in command of the Ditmarsken and the Pomeranian fleet, and also when reporting the duel with Staff. Garde was nevertheless aware that Carl and Carlsen were the same person. Gustav Ludvig Baden,^{(da.wiki)} mentioning him in passing, likewise refers to him as "Commandeur Carlsen." The mention by Baden (1833) is part of a cite in the biography of captain Friderich Lütken referenced to Address-Avis No. 21.

The Danish navy historian Jørgen Henrik Pagh Barfod^{(da.wiki)} uses the name "Christen Thomasen Carl." Barfod (1997) mentions selected incidents from Carl's life in the context of the Danish naval history between 1660 and 1720, and retrieved his information from warship journals and other documents in the Danish archives. "Chr. Thomasen Carl" is also used by August Peder Tuxen^{(da.wiki)} and Carl Ludvig With-Seidelin (1910).

=== Norwegian tradition ===
During Christian Thomsen Carl's lifespan, the kingdoms of Denmark and Norway were combined under the rule of the absolutist monarchs residing in Copenhagen and had a common fleet. Thus, the career of Christian Thomesen Carl is part of the Danish as well as the Norwegian naval history, and is noted e.g. in Olav Bergersen's^{(no.wiki)} 1956 history of the Dano-Norwegian navy. Bergersen refers to him as "Christen Thomesen Carl."

=== German tradition ===
In German literature, where Carl is only known by his last name, he is referred to most often as "Carlson," sometimes his name is spelled "Karlson," rarely "Carlsen." The focus of the German records is exclusively on Carl's role in the Greifswald town fire and/or, more prominently, on the events preventing the burning of Anklam.

A contemporary record is included in the chronicle of Christoph Helwig the Younger.^{(de.wiki)} Helwig (*1679, †1714) was a Greifswald resident who between 1709 and 1714 wrote a Latin chronicle of the medical faculty of the university of Greifswald which included events up to 1713. An annotated edition and German translation was published by Hans Georg Thümmel^{(de.wiki)} in 2001; it includes a mention of the Greifswald town fire without making a reference to Carl, but prominently identifies the "commandator navium Danicarum, dominus Carlson" as the one who prevented Anklam from being burned, and has the same details about his death as the sources used by Barfod.

Another nearly contemporary account of the role of "Carlson, the commander of the Danish warships" in preventing the burning of Anklam was published on 26 March 1754 by Joachim Friedrich Sprengel, rector in Anklam and later pastor in Boldekow. This account was republished in 1773 by the historian and secretary of the town of Anklam, Carl Friedrich Stavenhagen.^{(de.wiki)}

The role of "Carlson" in the Greifswald town fire was reported in 1827 by Carl Gesterding^{(de.wiki)} and in 1860 in Johann Carl Hahn's history of Greifswald, though without revealing his sources; Carl's role has also recently been emphasized by the historians Rudolf Biederstedt^{(de.wiki)} (1962, when he was in charge of the Greifswald town's archives) and Martin Meier (2007).

Some German sources address Carl as "admiral Carlson," e.g. Demmin's chronicler Wilhelm Karl Stolle^{(de.wiki)} (*1704, †1779), Johann Gottfried Ludwig Kosegarten in his 1857 chronicle of Greifswald's university, Gustav Kratz^{(de.wiki)} (1865), who graduated from school in Anklam, or Anklam's chronicler Heinz Bemowsky (*1921, †2003).

The first to draw a connection between "Carlson" and Carl was Max Sander, who in 1914 published an article "Carl, nicht Carlson, der Retter Anklams [Carl, not Carlson, Anklam's savior]." Sander retrieved and published from the university of Greifswald's archive a handwritten piece titled "Kurtze Relation von der erbärmlichen Einäscherung der pommerschen Städte Gartz und Wolgast, als dieselbe respektive am 10. und 27. Martii anno 1713 von den barbarischen Moskowitern kläglich in die Asche gelegt worden [Short notice of the disgraceful burning of the Pomeranian towns of Gartz and Wolgast, as these were laid in ashes by the barbarian Moscovites on 10 resp. 27 March 1713]." This notice, in the accusative case, speaks of "commandeur Carln."

Sander also retrieved various datasets from the Danish rigsarkivet, and published an outline of Carl's career and family background using the name "Christian Thomsen Carl." Sander asserts that this is the most correct spelling variant, as he had found a respective handwritten signature of Carl, which he also published.

Sander further published transcriptions and translations of various letters relating to the situation in Pomerania, among them

- a letter written by Carl on 19 February 1713 reporting to the Danish war chancellory, signed with "C T Carl"
- a letter written by the Danish captain M. Gude on 31 March 1713 reporting to the Danish admiralty a detailed description of Carl's death, using the variants "Carl" and "Carlsen,"
- a letter written by Ulrik Christian Gyldenløve on 6 April 1713 forwarding Gude's information about Carl's death to the war chancellory, using the name "Carl," and informing about the appointment of Carl's successor, Andreas Rosenpalm.

Biedenstedt (1962) also connected the Danish and German traditions, addressing Carl as "Christian Thomsen Carl (also called Carlson)," yet later German publications such as Bemowsky (1989) or Meier (2007) reverted to using "Carlson."

== In public memory ==
Regarding Anklam, consensus has formed in the German tradition of the events that the delay caused by the interception of Staff by Carl(son) was the decisive factor for the town's rescue. From 1715 to 1939, and again since 1992, an annual "Judica commemoration" is held where Carl ("Carlson") is remembered as playing the key role in the rescue of Anklam.

A wooden bust, supposedly showing Carl(son), was put on public display in Anklam. The bust was a gift from Swinemünde's consul Krause, who had retrieved it in 1841 from the damaged Swedish vessel Carlsson in Kristiansund and mistook it for a bust of Carl, whom he thought of as a Swede and namesake of the vessel. The bust was gradually damaged by influence of the weather, and later dismantled; in 1909 Walter Schröder reported that he had discovered the bust "in a chamber of our [i.e. Anklam's] town hall containing lots of interesting items," and said that it had been there already for several years.

Anklam's officials later named a street after Carl, Carlsonstraße, which still exists today.

== In fiction ==
Based on Carl's duel with Staff, commemorating his role in saving Anklam from being burned, the following fictional works were published (all in German):

- the novel Carlson from the early 18th century;
- the poem Anklams Erlösung [Anklam's salvation] by Wilhelm Meinhold;
- the essay Judica by Julius Mühlfeld, published in 1869;
- the play Anklam im nordischen Krieg [Anklam during the Northern War] by Karl Biesendahl, published in 1897.

== Sources ==
=== Bibliography ===
Secondary literature

- Baden, Gustav Ludvig (1833). Danmarks og Norges Kong Christian den Syvendes Regjerings Aarbog fra 14de Januari 1766 til 14de April 1784. Copenhagen. p. 326.
- Barfod, Jørgen Henrik Pagh (1997). Niels Juels flåde. Den danske flådens historie 1660-1720. Marinehistorisk Selskabs skrifter. Vol. 27. Copenhagen. pp. 128, 131, 184, 186. ISBN 9788700302266.
- Bemowsky, Heinz (1989). Lilienthalstadt Anklam. Aus der Geschichte der Stadt (PDF). Vol. 1. Anklam. p. 56. Archived from the original (PDF) on 2016-03-04.
- Bergersen, Olav (1956). Fra Henrik Bielke til Iver Huitfeldt. Utsyn over den dansk-norske fellesflåtes historie i perioden 1630 til 1710. Vol. 4. Trondheim. pp. 344, 566.
- Biederstedt, Rudolf (1962). "Geschichte des Greifswalder Stadtarchivs". Greifswald-Stralsunder Jahrbuch. Vol. 2. Schwerin. pp. 165–206, esp. 172.
- Biesner, Julius Heinrich (1839). Geschichte von Pommern und Rügen, nebst angehängter Special-Geschichte des Klosters Eldena. Greifswald. p. 257.
- Carstensen, William August; Lütken, Otto George (1887). Tordenskiold. Copenhagen. p. 97.
- Garde, Hans Georg (1835). Efterrentninger Om Den Danske Og Norske Søemagt. Vol. 4. Copenhagen. pp. 634–635.
- Garde, Hans Georg (1852). Den dansk-norske Sömagts historie 1700-1814. Copenhagen. pp. 35 ff.
- Gesterding, Carl (1827). Beitrag zur Geschichte der Stadt Greifswald oder vervollständigte Darstellung, Berichtigung und Erläuterung aller die Stadt Greifswald, ihre Kirchen und Stiftungen angehenden Urkunden bis zum Ende des achtzehnten Jahrhunderts. Vol. 1. Greifswald. pp. 319–322.
- Hahn, Johann Carl (1860). Geschichte der Stadt Greifswald. Greifswald. pp. 79–81.
- Heller, Karl Christian (1829). Chronik der Stadt Wolgast. Greifswald: Kunike. p. 232.
- Kosegarten, Johan Gottfried Ludwig (1857). Geschichte der Universität Greifswald mit urkundlichen Beilagen. Greifswald. pp. 148, 274.
- Kratz, Gustav (1865). Die Städte der Provinz Pommern. Abriß ihrer Geschichte, zumeist nach Urkunden. Berlin: Bath. p. 13.
- Loew, Alexander (2010-03-20). "Gymnasiasten gedachten Rettung der Stadt". Ostsee-Zeitung.
- Lützow, Johan Henrik (1788). Samling af historiske efterretninger om danske søe-officerer, med videre søe-etaten vedkommende, 1. del, 1. hæfte. Copenhagen.
- Meier, Martin (2007). Vorpommern nördlich der Peene unter dänischer Verwaltung 1715-1721. Aufbau einer Verwaltung und Herrschaftssicherung in einem eroberten Gebiet. Beiträge zur Militärgeschichte. Vol. 65. Munich. p. 60. ISBN 9783486582857.
- Minzloff, Carl Rudolf (1872). Pierre le Grand dans la littérature étrangère. Catalogue raisonné des Russica de la bibliothèque impérial de Saint-Pétersbourg. Vol. I. pp. 338–339. hdl:2027/nyp.33433069943649.
- Personalhistorisk Tidsskrift 7. Række VI. Bind. Copenhagen. 1920. pp. 24, 27.
- Sander, Max (1913). "Anklam im Nordischen Krieg April 1713". Heimatskalender für den Kreis Anklam (PDF). pp. 53–56. Archived from the original (PDF) on 2016-03-04.
- Sander, Max (1914). "Carl, nicht Carlson, der Retter Anklams". Heimatskalender für den Kreis Anklam (PDF). Vol. 9. pp. 27–31. Archived from the original (PDF) on 2016-03-04.
- Schröder, Walter (1909). "Carlson". Heimatkalender Anklam (PDF). Anklam. p. 80. Archived from the original (PDF) on 2016-03-04.
- Sehested, Thyra (1904). Admiral C.T. Sehesteds saga. Copenhagen. p. 91.
- Stavenhagen, Carl Friedrich (1773). Topographische und Chronologische Beschreibung der Pommerschen Kauf- und Handels-Stadt Anklam. Greifswald. pp. 293–295.
- Stavenhagen, Carl Friedrich (1899). "Topographische und Chronologische Beschreibung der Pommerschen Kauf- und Handels-Stadt Anklam". In Süssermann, Emil (ed.). Chronik von Anklam bis 1773 (PDF). Anklam. p. 241. Archived from the original (PDF) on 2016-03-04.
- Stolle, Wilhelm Carl (1772). Beschreibung und Geschichte der uralten, ehemals festen, grossen und berühmten Hanseestadt Demmin, wie auch der daran liegenden festen und berühmten Burg Haus Demmin genannt. Greifswald: Röse. p. 745.
- Topsøe-Jensen, Theodor Andreas; Marquard, Emil, eds. (1935). "Carl, Christian Thomesen". Officerer i den dansk-norske Søetat 1660-1814 og den danske Søetat 1814-1932. Vol. 1. Copenhagen. pp. 232–233.
- Thümmel, Hans Georg, ed. (2002). Geschichte der Medizinischen Fakultät Greifswald. Geschichte der Medizinischen Fakultät von 1456 bis 1713 von Christoph Helwig d. J. und das Dekanatsbuch der Medizinischen Fakultät von 1714 bis 1823. Beiträge zur Geschichte der Universität Greifswald. Vol. 3. Stuttgart. p. 215. ISBN 9783515079082.
- Thümmel, Hans Georg, ed. (2011). Greifswald. Geschichte und Geschichten. Paderborn. p. 124. ISBN 9783506767202.
- Tuxen, August Peder; With-Seidelin, Carl Ludvig (1910). De nordiske allieredes kamp med Magnus Stenbock 1712-1713 / udarbejdet ved Generalstaben af A. P. Tuxen og C. L. With-Seidelin. Bidrag til den store nordiske krigs historie. Vol. 4. Copenhagen/Christiania.
- Wächter, Joachim (2000). "Greifswald in der Schwedenzeit". In Wernicke, Horst (ed.). Greifswald. Geschichte der Stadt. Schwerin. pp. 85–102. ISBN 9783931185565.
- Wehrmann, Martin (1904). Geschichte von Pommern. Vol. 1. Gotha. p. 194.
- With-Seidelin, Carl Ludvig (1889). "Carl, Christian Thomesen". In Bricka, Carl Frederik (ed.). Dansk biografisk Lexikon. Vol. III. Copenhagen. pp. 374–375.

Primary sources

- "Excerpt of a letter sent by C. T. Carl from the Ditmarsken to the Danish Admiralty, 19 February 1713, transl. into German" in Sander (1914), p. 30.
- "[Letter from C. T. Sehested to C. T. Carl, 24 March 1713]". Danske Magazin 3die Række 3die Bind. Copenhagen. 1851. pp. 30–31.
- "[Letter from M. Gude to C. T. Sehested, 31 March 1713]". Danske Magazin 3die Række 3die Bind. Copenhagen. 1851. p. 32. Date and German translation in Sander (1914), p. 30.
- "Excerpt of a letter sent by U. C. Gyldenløve to the Danish War Chancellory, 6 April 1713, transl. into German" in Sander (1914), pp. 30–31.
- N.N. (1713). Wahrhaffte Relation von demjenigen, was bey Verbrennung der Stadt Wollgast und wegen Brandtes zu Greiffswald sich begeben. [s.i.]
- N.N. (1713). Kurtze Relation Von Der erbärmlichen Einäscherung der Pommerschen Städte Gartz und Wolgast/ Als dieselbe Respectivè am 16. und 27. Martii Anno 1713. von den Moscowitern kläglich in die Asche geleget worden/ Nebst einer Merckwürdigen Prophezeyung Simonis Pauli, SS. Theologiae Doctoris, und Professoris zu Rostock/ und desselbigen Districts Hochverdienten Superintendentis, Vom Verlauff Des gegenwärtigen Moscowitischen Krieges/ Der Nachwelt zum Andencken entworffen Im Jahr M D CC XIII. im Aprili (PDF). [s.i.] Archived from the original (PDF) on 2016-03-04.
- Helvigius (Helwig), Christophorus (Christoph) jun. (1714). <Geschichte der Medizinischen Fakultät von 1456 bis 1713>. Greifswald. ISBN 9783515079082. In Thümmel (ed.) (2002), pp. 27–220, esp. pp. 214–215.
- Sprengel, Joachim Friedrich (26 March 1754). <Einladungsschrift zur Judicafeier> (PDF). Anklam. Archived from the original (PDF) on 4 March 2016. In Stavenhagen (1889 repr.), pp. 240–242.

Fictional literature

- Biesendahl, Karl (1897). Anklam im Nordischen Krieg. Bühnen-Festspiel in 4 Akten und einem Vorspiel. Stuttgart.
- Meinhold, Wilhelm (1846). "Anklams Erlösung". Gesammelte Werke. Vermischte Gedichte. Vol. 4. Leipzig. pp. 248–256. Archived from the original on March 5, 2016.
- Mühlfeld, Julius (1869). "Judica". In Schönlein, Hermann (ed.). Das Buch für alle. Illustrierte Blätter zur Unterhaltung und Belehrung. Stuttgart. pp. 147–151.
- Quade, Gustav (1921). "Carlson. Novelle aus dem Anfang des 18. Jahrhunderts". Heimatskalender für den Kreis Anklam (PDF). pp. 64–79. Archived from the original (PDF) on 2016-03-04. (annotated reprint)

On Saisan / Saissan only

- Hofmann, Johann Christian Konrad (1837). Geschichte des Aufruhrs in den Sevennen unter Ludwig XIV. Nördlingen: Verlag der C. H. Beck'schen Buchhandlung. pp. 251 ff.
- Parke, Gilbert (1798). Letters and correspondence, public and private, of the Right Honourable Henry St. John Lord Viscount Bolingbroke. Vol. I. London. pp. 99–100.
- Rousseau, Pierre, ed. (March 1769). "(Review) La vie de Stanislas Leszczinski, surnommé le bienfaisant, roi de Pologne, duc de Lorraine et de Bar. Par M. Aubert, Avocat et conseils du Roi de Pologne, & de la cour souveraine de Lorraine, divisée en deux parties. A Paris, chez Moutard. 1769". Journal encyclopédique t. II p. III. Bouillon. pp. 405–421, esp. 417–419.

On von Staff only

- Gadebusch, Friederich Konrad (1782). Livländische Jahrbücher. Dritter Theil. Zweyter Abschnitt von 1661 bis 1710. Riga. pp. 483 ff.
- Bergmann, Benjamin von (1826). Peter der Große als Mensch und Regent dargestellt. Vol. III. Riga. pp. 144 ff., 339–340.
- Land-Räthe und Deputirte von der Mecklenburgischen Ritter- und Landschafft, ed. (1719). Höchst-gemüßigter historischer-ACTEN-mäßiger Bericht/ Von dem/ Was von Anfang der/ im Monath Augusto 1713. angetretenen Regierung des Durchlauchtigsten Fürsten und Herrn/ Hrn. CARL LEOPOLD, Hertzogen zu Mecklenburg <etc.> Bis zu der/ im Monath Martio und April 1719. Ergangenen kayserlichen Execution, Von dem Fürstl. Mecklenburgischen MINISTERIO, Wieder die Mecklenburgische Ritterschafft und Stadt Rostock/ <...> vielfältig erfolgte Res Judicatas, Rescripta, Mandata <...> und andere ernstliche Verordnungen &c. Durch mannigfaltige Violence, Arresta und Gefangenschaften <...> Sonders beschwerlich und unjustificirlich vorgenommen worden. [s.i.] Therein:
  - No. 331. Copia Repartitionis der Port- und Rationum für die Generalität und Regimenter Infanterie der Repninschen Division (1716), pp. 335 ff.
  - No. 343. Copia documenta von der harten Rußischen Execution auf dem Adelichen Gute Brock / de dato Grevismühlen den 20. November 1716, pp. 346 f.
