= 1707 in Denmark =

- Decades: 1680s; 1690s; 1700s; 1710s; 1720s
- See also: Other events of 1707; List of years in Denmark

Events from the year 1707 in Denmark.

== Incumbents ==
- Monarch – Frederick IV
- Grand Chancellor – Conrad von Reventlow

== Events ==
- 1 December – HDMS Justitia is launched at the Royal Danish Dockyard.
- 4 December – The Danish East India Company's ship Norske Løve departs from Copenhagen but is hit by lightning on 18 December.

== Deaths ==
- 23 February – Tage Thott, county governor, Supreme Court justice and landowner (born 1648)
- 10 March – Bendix Grodtschilling the Younger, painter (born 1655)
