= 1783 in Denmark =

- Decades: 1760s; 1770s; 1780s; 1790s; 1800s
- See also: Other events of 1783; List of years in Denmark

Events from the year 1783 in Denmark.

== Incumbents ==
- Monarch – Christian VII
- Prime minister – Ove Høegh-Guldberg

== Events ==
- 5 July – HDMS Friderichsværn is launched at Bodenhoffs Plads in Copenhagen.

== Births ==
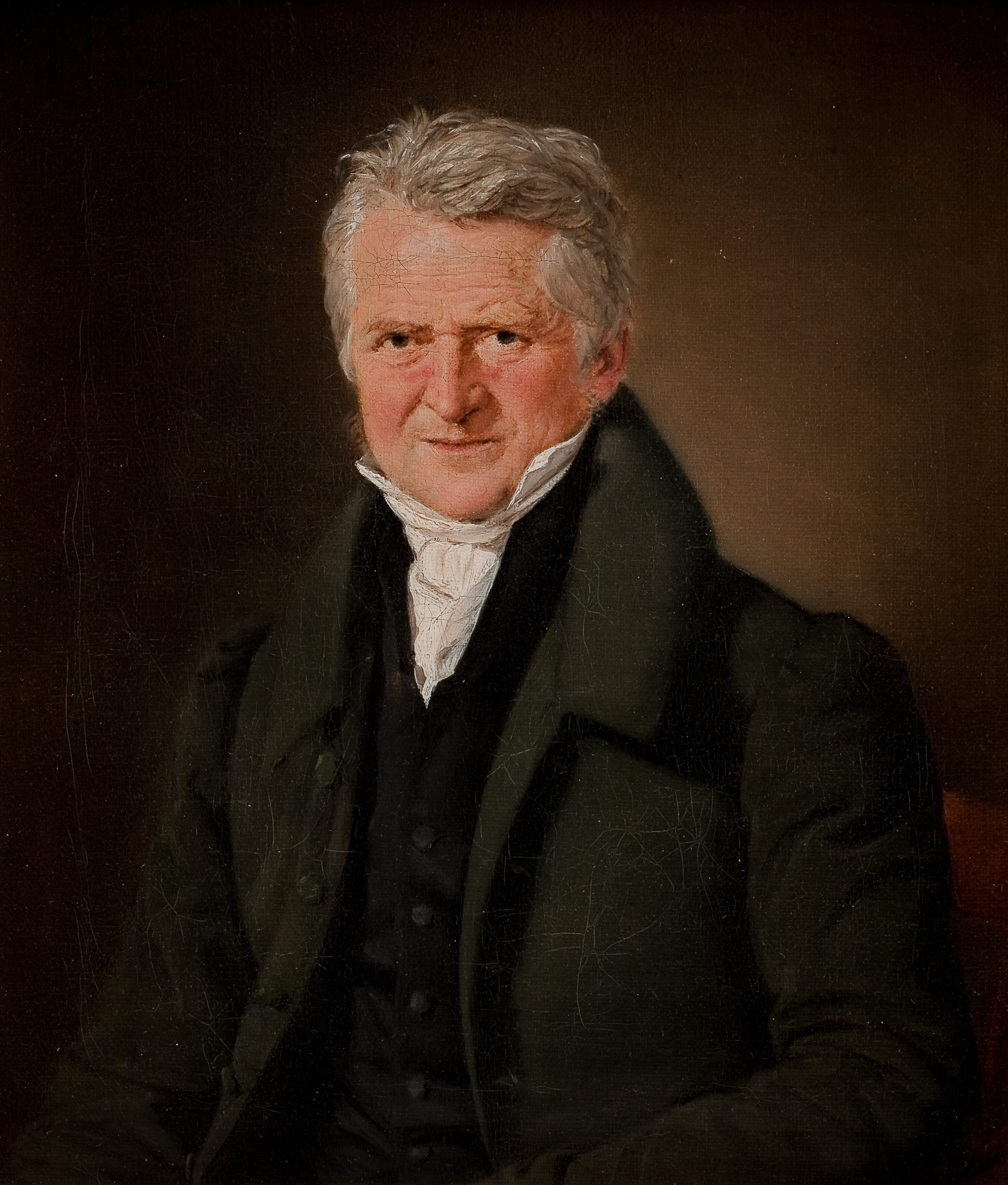
Christoffer Wilhelm Eckersberg-

- 2 January – Christoffer Wilhelm Eckersberg, painter (d. 1853)
- 6 March – Emilie Rosing, singer (died 1811)
- 11 May – Peter Willemoes, naval officer (d. 1808)
- 15 August – Christian Gottlieb Kratzenstein Stub, painter (died 1816)
- 8 September – N. F. S. Grundtvig, pastor, author, poet, philosopher, historian, teacher and politician (d. 1872)
- 8 October – Christian Molbech, historian and editor (d. 1857)

== Deaths ==
- 14 April – Abraham Pelt, industrialist and philanthropist (born 1695)
- 15 June – Ludvig Harboe, theologian and bishop (born 1709)
- 18 August – Joachim Melchior Magens, colonial administrator and planter (born 1715)
- 19 January – Bartholomæus Bertelsen de Cederfeld, county governor (born 1715)
- 17 December – Gysbert Behagen, merchant (born 1725)
