= 1775 in Denmark =

- Decades: 1750s; 1760s; 1770s; 1780s; 1790s
- See also: Other events of 1775; List of years in Denmark

Events from the year 1775 in Denmark.

== Incumbents ==
- Monarch – Christian VII
- Prime minister – Ove Høegh-Guldberg

== Events ==
- 1 May – The Royal Danish Porcelain Factory is founded by the chemist Frantz Heinrich Müller, who is given a 50-year monopoly to create porcelain in Denmark, and begins operations in a converted post office.

=== Undated ===
- Bygholm Manor is completed near Horsens.
- Vincenzo Galeotti succeeds Vincenzo Piatolli as artistic director of the Royal Danish Ballet.
- Nicolai Abildgaard completes The Wounded Philoctetes.

== Births ==
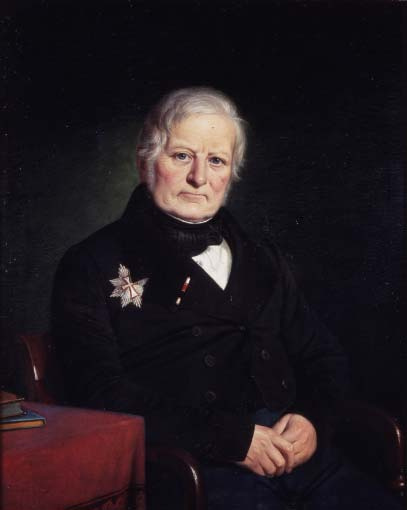
Nicolai Abraham Holten.

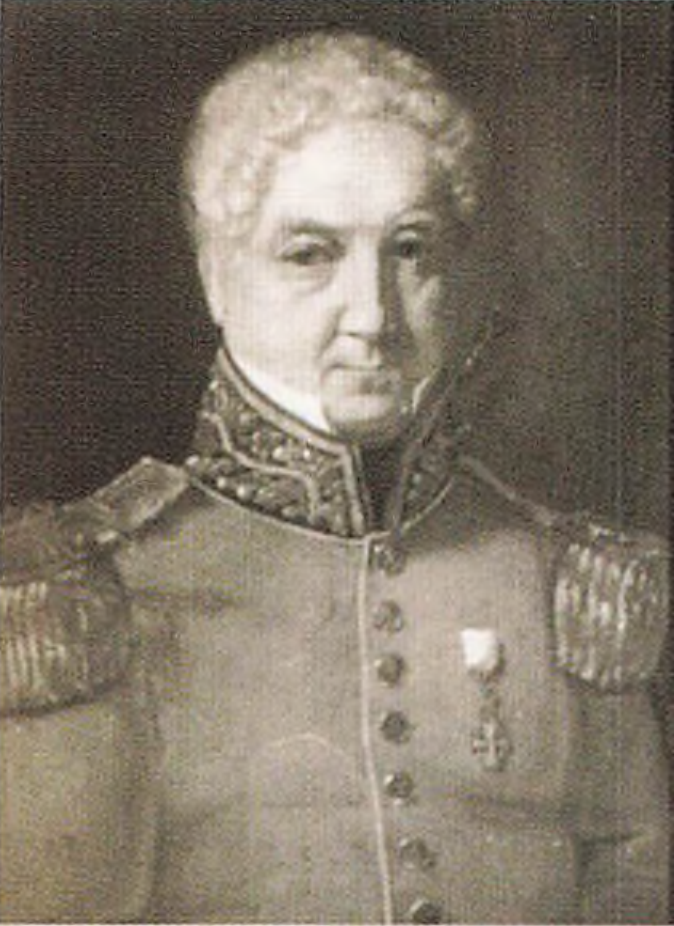
Johannes Rehling.

=== January–June ===
- 16 March – Martin Christian Gottlieb Lehmann, engraver (died 1856)
- 27 March – Nicolai Abraham Holten, banker and civil servant (died 1850)
- 22 June – Ulrich Anton Schønheyder, naval officer (died 1858)

=== July–December ===
- 2 July – Joachim Melchior Magens, colonial administrator and lawyer (died 1845)
- 12 August – Conrad Malte-Brunm, geographer and journalist (died 1826)
- 17 August – Johannes Rehling, colonial administrator /died 1841)
- 17 September – Margrethe Schall, dancer (died 1852)
- 9 October – Peter Thonning, physician and botanist (died 1848)
- 19 October – Kamma Rahbek, salonist and lady of letters (died 1829)
- 1 November – Christian Adolph Diriks, lawyer (died 1837)
- 8 November – Jacob Peter Mynster, theologian and bishop (died 1854)
- 19 December – Hermann Christian Müffelmann, businessman (died 1848)

== Deaths ==
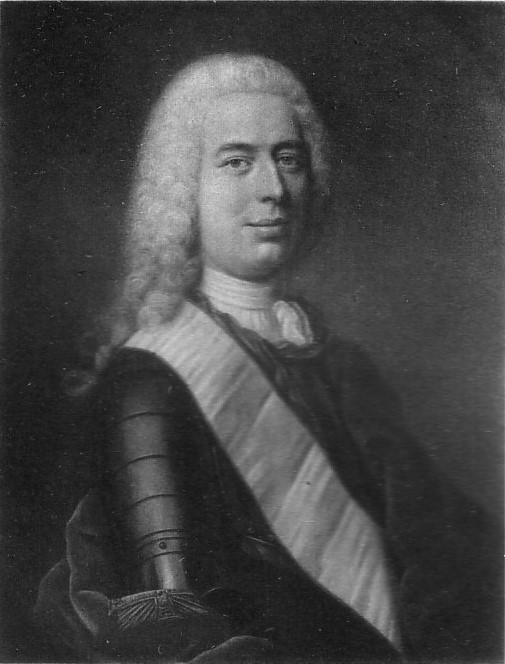
Christian Ditlev Reventlow.

- 30 March – Christian Ditlev Reventlow, Privy Councillor and nobleman (born 1710)
- 10 April – Jonas Haas, engraver (born 1720)
- 15 June – Joost van Hemert, merchant and ship-owner (born 1696)
- 16 August – Jakob Langebek, historian (born 1710)
- 16 October – Peter van Hurk, businessman (born 1697)
- 25 November – Jacob Benzon, nobleman, civil servant and Governor-general of Norway (born 1688)
