= 1768 in Denmark =

- Decades: 1740s; 1750s; 1760s; 1770s; 1780s
- See also: Other events of 1768; List of years in Denmark

Events from the year 1768 in Denmark.

== Incumbents ==
- Monarch – Christian VII
- Prime minister – Count Johann Hartwig Ernst von Bernstorff

== Events ==
August

- 16 August – The equestrian statue of Frederick V is installed on Amalienborg in Copenhagen.

November

- 8 November – Wedding of Christian VII and Caroline Mathilde.
- 22 November – HDMS Den Prægtige is launched at Nyholm in Copenhagen.
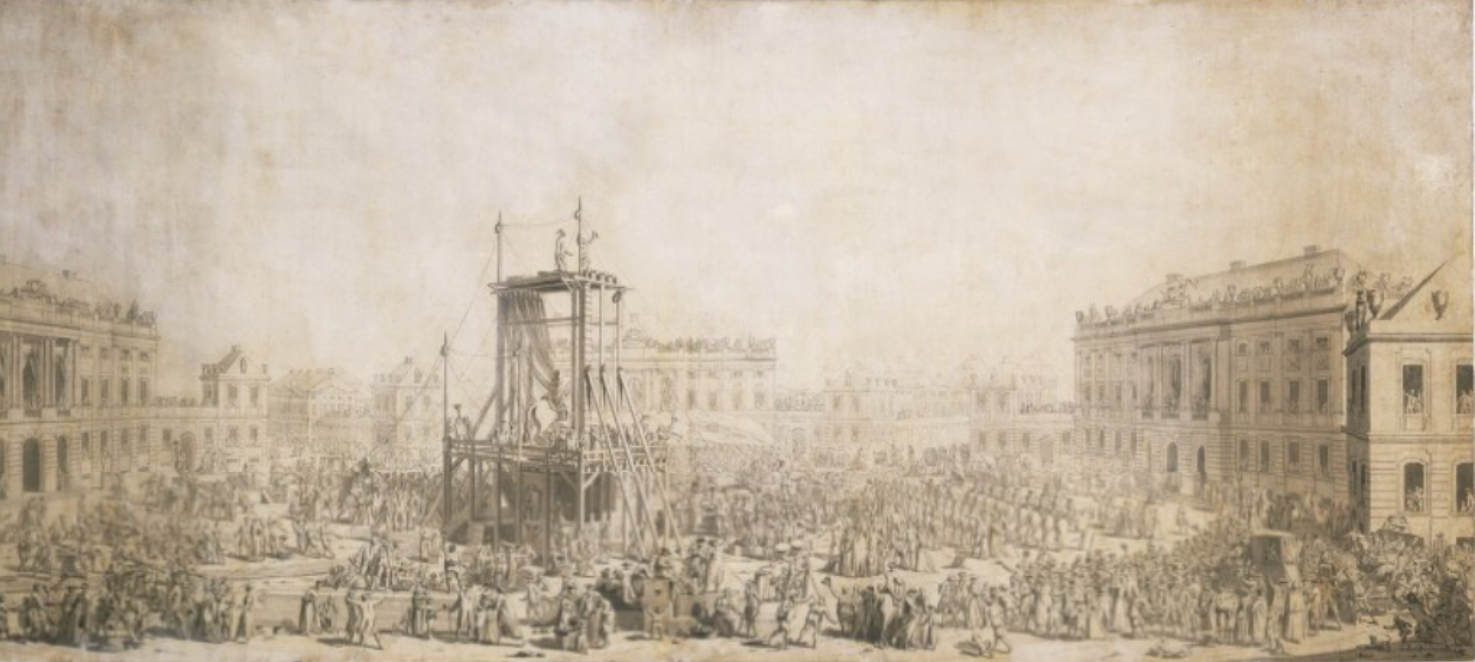
16 August: The installation of the equestrian statue of Frederick V on Amalienborg Slotsplads in Copenhagen

== Births ==
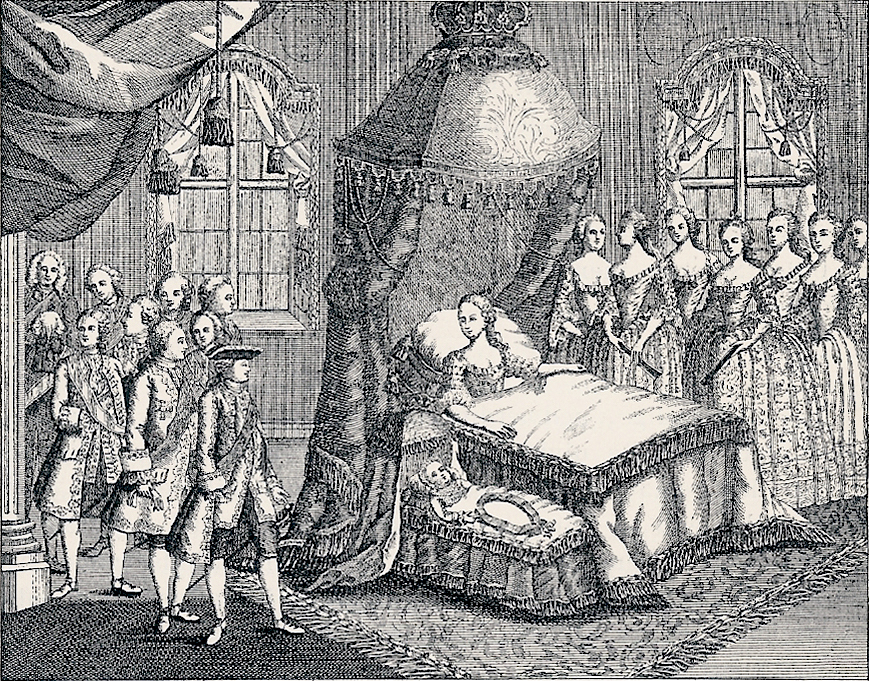
29 January: The newborn Prince Frederik on display together with his mother Queen Caroline Matilda one day after his birth

- 28 January – Frederick VI, King of Denmark (died 1839)
- 10 February – Anne Cathrine Collett, landowner (died 1846)
- 9 July – Charles August, Crown Prince of Sweden (died 1810 in Sweden)

=== Full date missing ===
- Mariane Bournonville, ballet dancer (died 1797)

== Deaths ==
- 21 March – Christian Fleischer, civil servant (born 1713)
- 2 October – Otto von Rantzau, government official (born 1719)
- 17 December – Joachim Hartvig Johan von Barner, government official (born 1700 in Germany)

=== Full date missing ===
- Christian Tychsen, governor
- Peter Mathiesen, clockmaker (born 1696)
