= Peter Westerstrøm =

Swedish mass murderer (1779–1809)

Peter Westerstrøm (1779–1809) was a Swedish mass murderer who gained notoriety for the Saksebøl Slaughter in Moss, Norway during the Napoleonic wars.

== Background ==
Peter Westerstrøm was born in Ljungby in Sweden around 1779. His father Jonas was the local sexton, but died when Peter was 8 years old. His mother died in 1804 and Peter was raised by his brother. He started his professional career as a man-servant; later on he started training as a tailor, but never became more than an apprentice. He later claimed to have tried to have started an enterprise refining cotton, but he had to borrow money and the enterprise failed. This story was never corroborated as there was a state of war between Denmark-Norway and Sweden at the time, and there was serious doubt about his story.

By 1806, he had moved to Norway. By his own confession, the move was in order to avoid being thrown into the debtors' prison after his bankruptcy. An unconfirmed rumour stated that he had fled Sweden after having murdered and robbed his late employer, Lieutenant General Liljehorn. In Norway, he established himself as a tailor in the city of Moss, traveling around the local countryside to obtain work from the surrounding peasantry.

== The crime - The Saksebøl Slaughter ==
During the night of 31 December 1808–1 January 1809, he killed the four inhabitants at the station Saksebøl in Hobøl. The victims were the station manager Johannes Jensen and his three servants Lars Arvesen, Jens Svensen and Karen Olsdatter. The murder weapon was an axe he had brought with him for the explicit purpose of murder. The motive was greed; the station manager's strongbox was forced and the house robbed of valuables. Westerstrøm fled with 20 daler in cash, some clothes, some silver spoons, a pair of boots and a pipe. After the crime, he tried to reach Sweden but was hindered by foul weather.

== The investigation ==
The autopsy was undertaken by Dr Hans Munk. An investigative commission was established consisting of Christian Magnus Falsen (judge in Follo), sheriff Jacob Wulfsberg in Christiania (now Oslo), Lieutenant Colonel Hans Jacob von Scheel and the judge in Moss, Ove Hiorth. A reward of 1,000 daler was offered for information that would lead to arrest of the guilty. This reward led to Westerstrøm being turned in by friends.

On 6 February 1809, Peter Westerstrøm was arrested at Moss and brought before the commission. He confessed to the murders after some attempts at denial. The case was open and shut: He was found in possession of much of the stolen goods and could lead the authorities to where he had hidden the rest. As for the motive, Westerstrøm first claimed mental depression, stating that he wanted to commit suicide and this way he could get the state executioner to do the job. His second explanation stated that, as he was an unreformable criminal, he wanted to be remembered as the greatest crook in Norwegian history. His third confession stated that the murder was done out of revenge, as he believed the station manager had been instrumental in breaking up his engagement to a rich heiress.

== Trial and execution ==
On 24 July 1809, he was sentenced by the commission to be pinched five times with red-hot pincers by the executioner; after this his hand would be lopped off with an axe and finally he would be beheaded. The head, the hand and the body would then be publicly displayed on poles until they rotted. This was the punishment recommended for murders within the family (patricides, matricides, but also murders of employers).

On 16 August 1809, this sentence was moderated in the Supreme Court. He was sentenced for premeditated homicide only, and the punishment was reduced to simple beheading with axe; the torture was dropped. Only his head would go on the pole.

On 23 September 1809, King Frederik VI approved of the sentence of the Supreme Court. On 27 October 1809, Westerstrøm was executed in front of the prison in Moss. With him at the scaffold was his parson Niels Wulfsberg. The executioner was Anton Lædel, this being his fifth execution. After 24 hours, the head was taken down again and buried next to the corpse.
