= Oliger Paulli =

Danish merchant, pamphleteer, religious fanatic and publisher (1644–1714)

- Born: 18 March 1644; Copenhagen, Kingdom of Denmark–Norway
- Died: August 1714; Copenhagen, Kingdom of Denmark–Norway
- Occupations: Merchant; Pamphleteer; Publisher
- Known for: Religious advocacy for Jewish restoration to the Holy Land
- Notable work: The Dove of Noah, The Triumph of the Stone Cut Without Hands
- Relatives: Simon Paulli (father)

Oliger (Holger) Paulli (18 March 1644 – August 1714), also spelt as Olliger Paulli, was a wealthy Danish merchant from an influential family, pamphleteer, religious fanatic, and publisher. He was renowned for his over-zealous activities for the return of Jewish people to their promised holy land.

He was well known for claiming his great-grandfather, "Simon Paulli (Sr.)", as a Jew and descendant of the royal line of David. His controversial promulgations and religiously fanatical publications such as The Dove of Noah and The Triumph of the Stone cut without Hands created hopes and theological tensions among major religions of those days.

== Early life ==
He was born on 18 March 1644, at Copenhagen. His father, Simon Paulli, was a reputed Anatomist and royal physician to Frederick III of Denmark. His grandfather, Heinrich Paulli (1565-1610), was a personal physician of queen Sophie of Mecklenburg-Güstrow. His great-grandfather, Simon Paulli (Sr.), was a presumably a German Lutheran theologian and first superintendent of Rostock.

== Career ==
He was a bookkeeper for the West Indies and Danish West India Company in Copenhagen. With business and commerce prosperity, he was appointed secretary to the Danish West India Company. Over the period, he became one of the richest merchants in Denmark. Between 1683 and 1688, he started his own ship and cargoes to Guinea as a result of delivering supplies to the fort or payment of "recognition". It appears, he made lot of fortune on then, prosperous slave trade in the West Indies and on the coast of Guinea.

It seems, due to committing many extravagancies and lavish lifestyle, he went bankrupt and eventually became deranged. He then quit his family and went to Paris. Over there, he proposed a plan for the conquest of Judea with an aim of rebuilding Jerusalem. In 1694, he proclaimed himself as new messiah and king of the Jews.

In spite of presumed Christian descendency, he appears to have claimed his great-grandfather, Simon Paulli (Sr.), was a Jew and descendant of David's royal house. He justified his claim showing the name Paulleli as a combination of Greek Paulus and Hebrew Eli; thus, meaning God supplies the inadequacy. He also claimed that, at the age of 13, he made a blood covenant with God, who exchanged a yodh for the he in his baptismal name, thereafter, renaming his original name from Holiger to Oliger (Olliger), to connote "through him Jesus would be brought to the Jews." In addition, the name Oliger is also held as an allusion to the olive leaf of Noah's dove. He apparently seems to have raised theological controversy that Jesus didn't cry out "My God, my God, why hast thou forsaken me?" (Matthew 27:46; Mark 15:34), but instead "Why hast thou glorified me!"

He proclaimed his intention of establishing a new Jewish kingdom in Palestine. He even wrote letters to several European rulers apprising and assuring them that Jerusalem will be rebuilt in 1720, in which year messiah would descend from heaven to officiate as high priest of Jerusalem, the holy city. He sent mystical letters to William III of England and Dauphin of France urging them to undertake the restoration of Jews.

He was imprisoned at Amsterdam in 1701, for publishing a book ridiculing Christianity and announcing a plan and project to establish a new religion on its ruins. His family secured his release in 1702 with a condition that they would keep him away from Holland. From 1702 to 1706, he travelled across Germany continuing the publication of religious pamphlets and propaganda about his cause. However, it appears, he had less success in Germany than in Holland, forcing him to return to Copenhagen in 1706.

Upon returning Copenhagen, he continued his Jewish missionary propaganda at home too. A number of Jews encouraged his efforts to establish a new kingdom of Israel with frequent Jewish assemblage at his home and several meetings where Oliger spoke on his holy mission. Further to his cause, he published several books and pamphlets angering local Christian populace. When the local Christians' anger reached its peak to the extent of a possible outbreak against Jews, king Frederick IV of Denmark had to step in, ordering Copenhagen police chief to admonish Oliger and put an end to Oliger's demonstrations and meetings.

== Death ==
He died at Copenhagen in August 1714.

== Works ==
- The Dove of Noah
- Good News from Canaan
- The Triumph of the Stone Cut Without Hands

== Literature ==
Jeannine Kunert: 'I who knows no Hebrew': On the relation of language, identity and millenarian expectations as exemplified by Oliger Paulli", in Sabine Sander (Ed.): Language as Bridge and Border – Linguistics, Cultural, and Political Constellations in 18th to 20th Century German-Jewish Thought, Berlin 2015. 51-69.

Jeannine Kunert, Alexander van der Haven: “Jews and Christians United: The 1701 Prosecution of Oliger Paulli and his Dutch Printers”, Studia Rosenthaliana: Journal of the History, Culture and Heritage of the Jews in the Netherlands 46 no. 1–2 (2020): 71–95. https://doi.org/10.5117/SR2020.1-2.004.KUNE.
