= 1769 census (Denmark–Norway) =

First census covering the Oldenburg State

Map of the Oldenburg State, c. 1780.

The 1769 census was the first census covering the Oldenburg State: the Kingdom of Denmark, the Kingdom of Norway (including the Faroese Islands and Iceland), the Duchy of Schleswig, the Duchy of Holstein, and the Countship of Oldenburg.

== Number of inhabitants ==
Country	Region	Inhabitants
Denmark	in total	786,000+
Norway	in total	774,000
	Norway proper	723,000
	Faroese Islands	5,000
	Iceland	46,000
	Greenland	6000
Schleswig	in total	244,000
Holstein	in total	279,000
	royal part	135,000
	ducal part	144,000
Oldenburg	in total	79,000

== See also ==
- Census in Germany

== Literature ==
- Dyrvik, Ståle: Norsk historie 1536–1814 Det Norske Samlaget. ISBN 9788252174427
