= 1845 in Denmark =

- Decades: 1820s; 1830s; 1840s; 1850s; 1860s
- See also: Other events of 1845; List of years in Denmark

Events from the year 1845 in Denmark.

== Incumbents ==
- Monarch – Christian VIII
- Prime minister – Poul Christian Stemann

== Events ==
- 15 June – Klampenborg Vandkuur-, Brønd- og Søbadeanstalt, the first spa resort in Denmark, opens.

=== Undated ===
- Henrik Hertz writes the verse drama Kong Renés Datter

== Culture ==
=== Music ===
- 22 August – Hans Christian Lumbye's Champagne Galop premières in Tivoli Gardens to mark the second anniversary of the amusement park.

== Births ==
=== January–March ===
- 20 January – Anna Laursen, educator and activist (died 1911)

=== April–June ===
- 20 May – Johan Henrik Deuntzer, prime minister (died 1918)

=== July–September ===
- 19 July – Frederik Winkel Horn, historian and translator (died 1898)
- 23 July – Godfred Christensen, painter (died 1928)
- 2 August – Kaspar Rostrup, businessman (died 1911)

=== October–December ===
- 24 December – King George I of Greece (died 1913 in Greece)

== Deaths ==
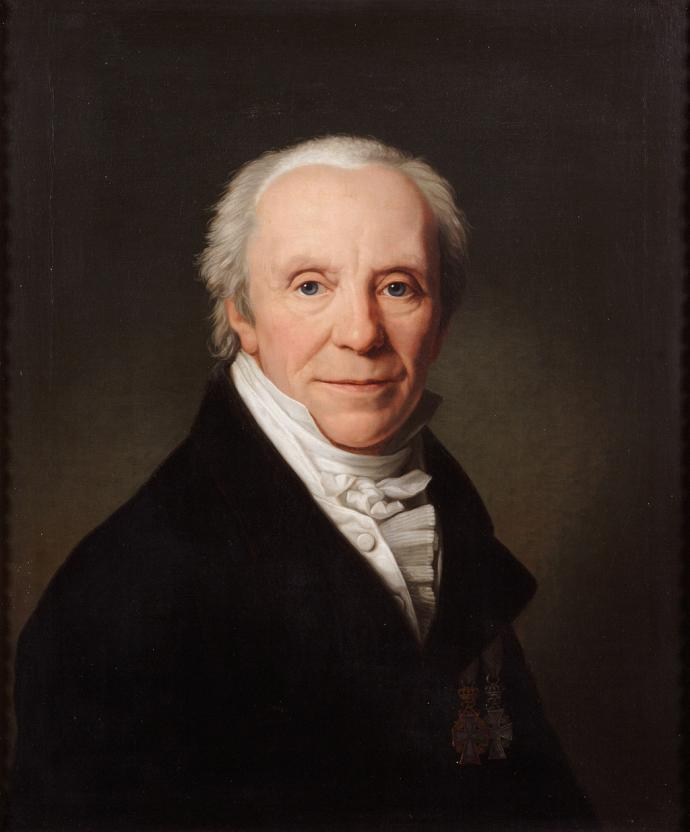
Christian Frederik Hansen.

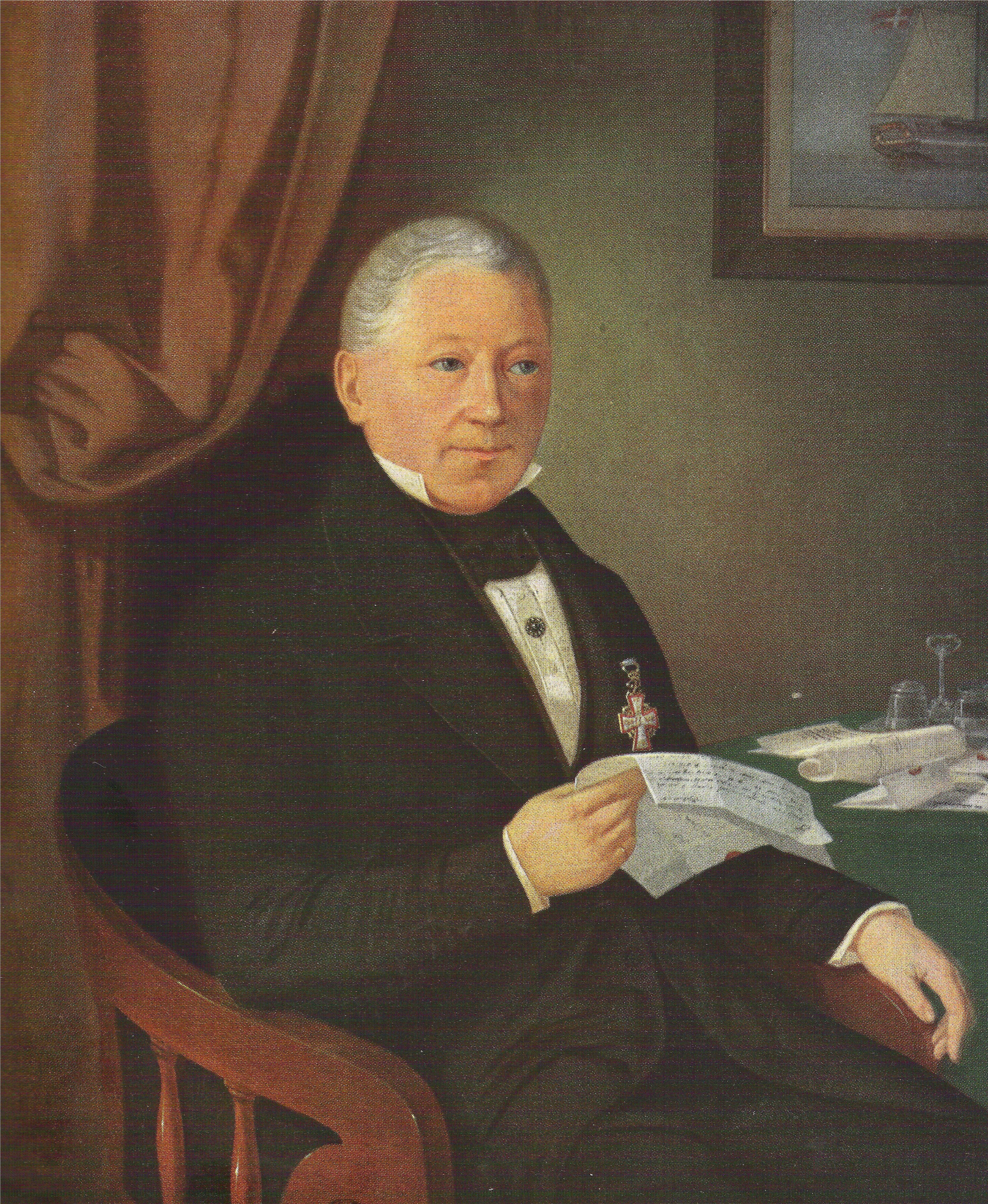
Hacob Holm.

=== January–March ===
- 24 February – Prince Frederik of Hesse, nobleman, general and governor (born 1771)
- 3 June – Joachim Melchior Magens, colonial administrator and lawyer (born 1775)
- 27 March – Michael Johannes Petronius Bille, naval officer (died 1769 )

=== April–June ===
- 28 April – Joachim Dietrich Brandis, physician (born 1762 in Germany)

=== July–September ===
- 3 July – Hans Haagen, chief of police (died 1754)
- 10 July – Christian Frederik Hansen, architect (born 1756)
- 21 June – Gottfried Becker (born 1767), pharmacist and industrialist (born 1767)
- 28 July – Johanna Elisabeth Dahlén, stage actress and opera singer (born 1757)
- 4 August – Jacob Holm, industrialist, ship owner and ship builder (born 1779)
