= Hans Munk =

Norwegian physician

Hans Munk (20 July 1770 – 5 February 1848) was a Norwegian medical doctor. He performed the autopsies in the Peter Westerstrøm mass murder case.

Munk was born in Copenhagen, Denmark where he received his doctorate in 1793. He worked in Stavanger Amt (1799-1803), Buskeruds Amt (1803-1806) and in Smaalehnenes Amt (1806-1817). He ended his career in Bratsberg (1817-1848).
