= Treaty of Dresden (1709) =

1709 alliance between Denmark-Norway and Augustus the Strong

The Treaty of Dresden was concluded on 28 June 1709, during the Great Northern War. It re-established the alliance between Frederik IV of Denmark-Norway and Augustus the Strong against the Swedish Empire.

== Sources ==
- Czech, Vinzenz (2008). Das Potsdamer Dreikönigstreffen 1709 (in German). Cuvillier. ISBN 978-3-86727-638-2.
