= Christian Christophersen Sehested =

Danish noble

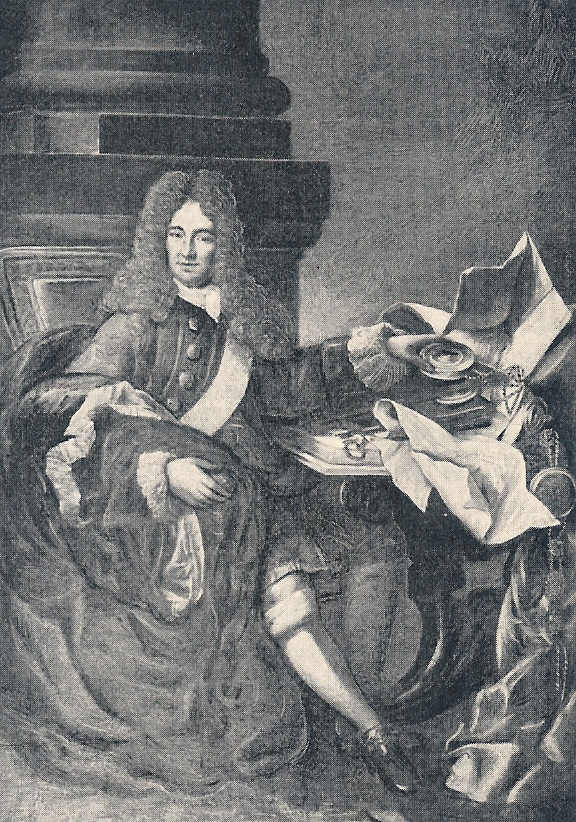
A picture of Christian Sehested

Christian Christophersen Sehested (22 Febr. 1666 – 19 July 1740) was a Danish noble and statesman.

== Biography ==
He was the son of Christoffer Clausen Sehestedt til Nislevgaard paa Fyn (d. 1699). After the death of his father, he inherited the Nislevgaard manor. In 1701 he was married to Charlotte Amalie Gersdorff (b. 1685 d. 1751). Through the marriage, he came to possess Ravnholt manor. His marriage was childless.

He became a nobleman Hofjunker in 1687. In 1694, he was Deputy in the Land and the Applicant's Commission. In 1698 he obtained the State Council title was sent to Stockholm as to replace Jens Juel (1631 –1700). He was called in 1700 to become Foreign Minister. He was the second Grand Chancellor of Denmark from 1708 to 1721. He was preceded by Conrad von Reventlow (1644–1708) and succeeded by Ulrik Adolf Holstein (1664–1737).

He returned to Odense as county governor in 1735 where he died in 1740. He was replaced as county governor by Christian Rantzau (1684–1771).

Political offices
Preceded by Conrad von Reventlow	Grand Chancellor of Denmark; 1708 – 1721	Succeeded by Ulrik Adolf Holstein
