= 1791 in Denmark =

- Decades: 1770s; 1780s; 1790s; 1800s; 1810s
- See also: Other events of 1791; List of years in Denmark

Events from the year 1791 in Denmark.

== Incumbents ==
- Monarch – Christian VII
- Prime minister – Andreas Peter Bernstorff

== Events ==
- 10 September – HDMS Lougen, a brig of 18 guns, is launched from the shipyard at Nyholm in Copenhagen.

=== Undated ===
- Døtreskolen af 1791 is founded.

== Culture ==
=== Art ===
- Jens Juel paints The Artist and his Wife Rosine, née Dørschel
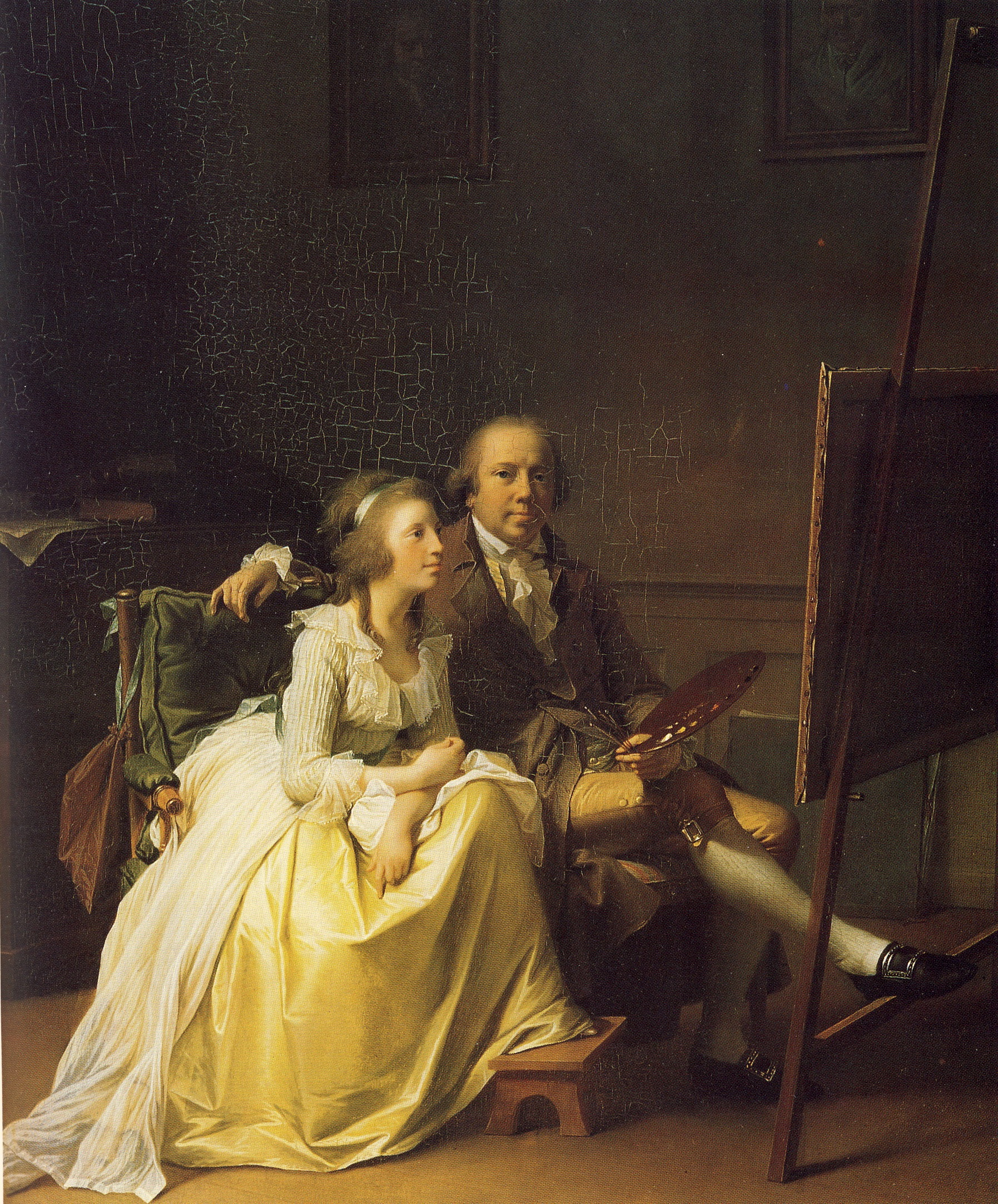
Juel:The Artist and his Wife Rosine, née Dørschel

== Births ==
- 9 March – Nicolai Jonathan Meinert, businessman (died 1877)
- 5 April – Christian Tuxen Falbe, naval officer and explorer (died 1849)
- 19 June – Henriette Jørgensen, actor (died 1847)
- 14 December – Johan LudvigHeiberg, poet (died 1860)
- 17 December – Birgitte Andersen, stage actor and ballet dancer (died 1875)

== Deaths ==
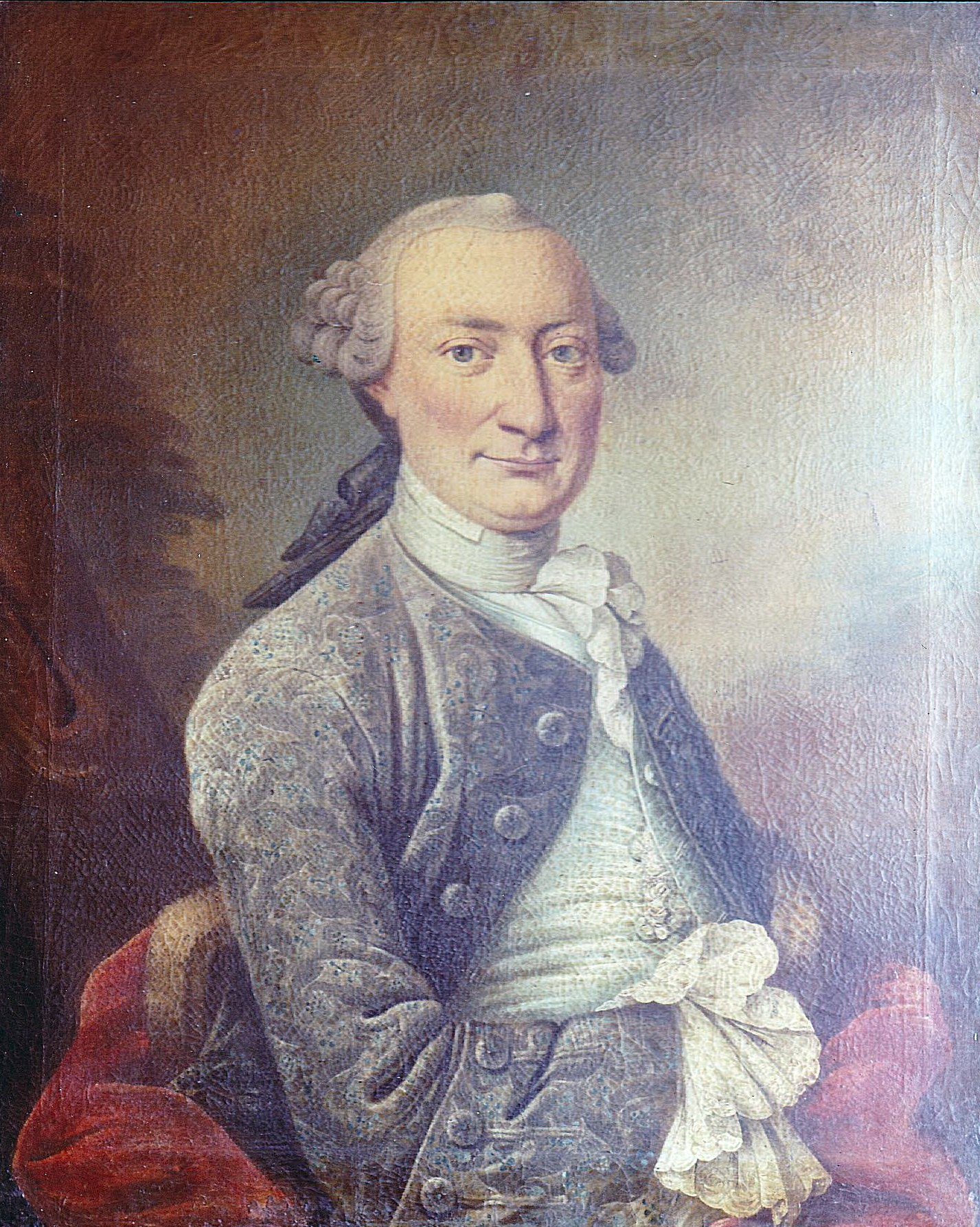
Jens Michelsen Beck.

- 2 July – Søren Abildgaard, naturalist, writer and illustrator (born 1718)
- 13 July – Ole Stephansen, naval officer (born 1714)
- 29 May – Jens Michelsen Beck, surveyor, cartographer, landowner and planter (born 1721)
- 25 November – Magnus Theiste, government official (born 1725)
