= 1778 in Denmark =

- Decades: 1750s; 1760s; 1770s; 1780s; 1790s
- See also: Other events of 1778; List of years in Denmark

Events from the year 1778 in Denmark.

== Incumbents ==
- Monarch – Christian VII
- Prime minister – Ove Høegh-Guldberg

== Events ==
- 4 September – Conrad Alexander Fabritius (1731–1805) and Michael Fabritius (1739–1815), as well as all legitimate children of their then-deceased father Michael Fabritius (1697-1746), are ennobled by letters patent under the name Fabritius de Tengnagel.

== Culture ==
=== Theatre ===
- Johannes Ewald's opera The Death of Valder (written 1663) is performed for the first time.

== Births ==
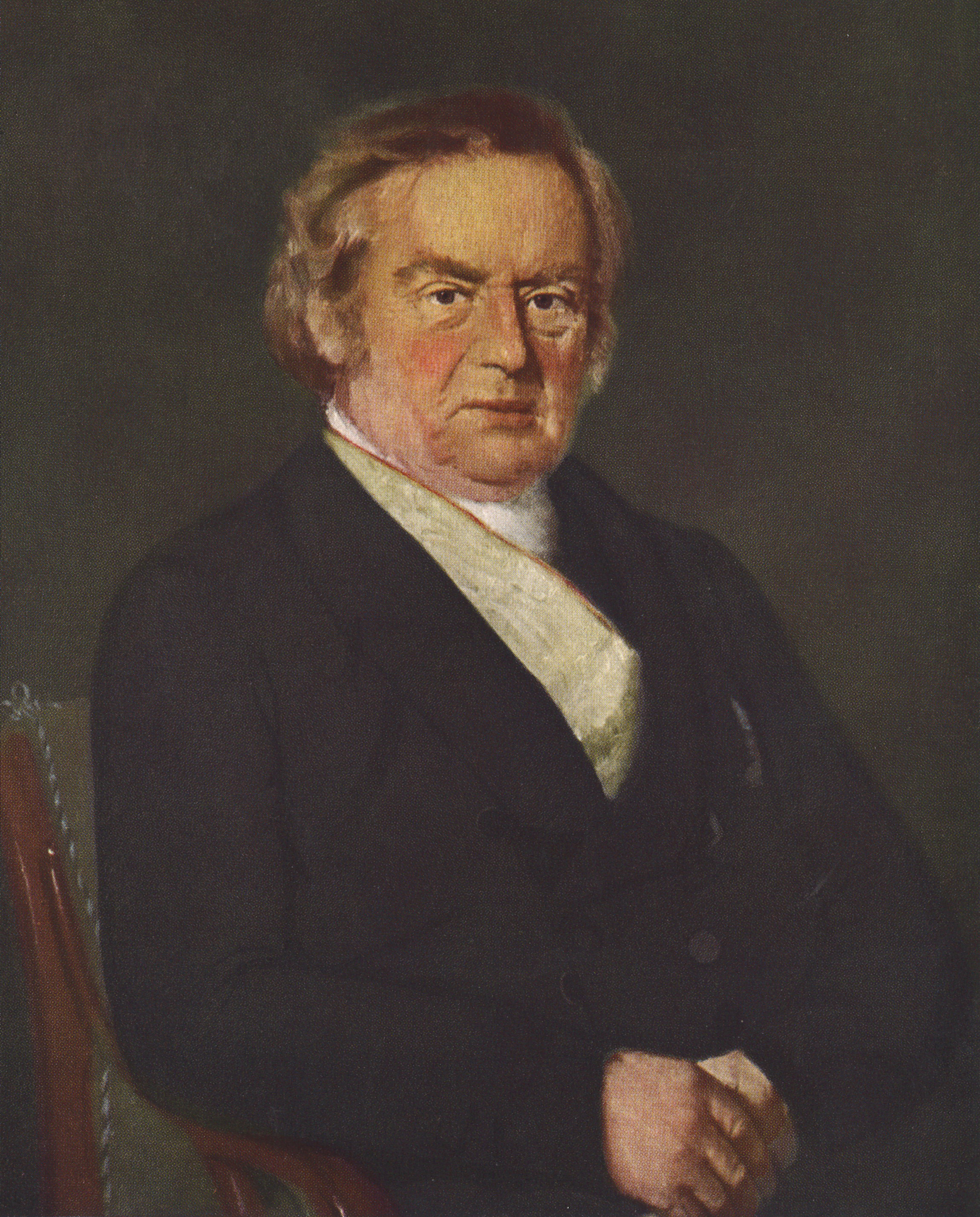
Anders Sandøe Ørsted.

- 1 March – Peter Christian Uldahl, piano maker (died 1820)
- 20 April – Bendix Frantz Ludwig Schow, mayor (died 1839)
- 12 October – Hartvig Philip Rée. businessman (died 1859)
- 21 December – Anders Sandøe Ørsted, jurist and politician, Prime Minister of Denmark (died 1860)

== Deaths ==
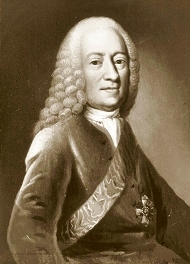
Jean Henri Desmercières-

- 5 March – Hans Diderik Brinck-Seidelin, Supreme Court justice and landowner (born 1720)
- 8 March – Jean Henri Desmercières, businessman (born 1687)
- 1 April – Volrad August von der Lühe, government official (born 1705)
- 25 July – Bernhard Møllmann, historian, writer, librarian and professor (born 1702)
- 8 October – Margrethe Marie Thomasine Numsen, court official (born 1705)
