= 1725 in Denmark =

- Decades: 1700s; 1710s; 1720s; 1730s; 1740s
- See also: Other events of 1725; List of years in Denmark

Events from the year 1725 in Denmark.

== Incumbents ==
- Monarch – Frederick IV
- Grand Chancellor – Ulrik Adolf Holstein

== Events ==
April

- 25 April – HDMS Slesvig is launched at Nyholm in Copenhagen.

May

- 28 May – Frederik Michael Krabbe, naval officer and master shipbuilder (died 1796)

October

- 1 October – The County of Scheel is established by Christen Skeel from the manors of Sostrup, Skærvad, Ørbækgaard, Steensmark, Debildhede, Skiern and Karmark.

== Births ==
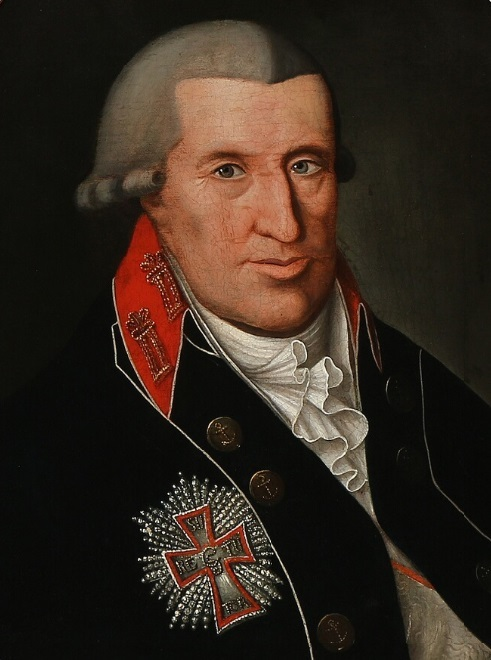
Antoine-Nicolas le Sage de Fontenay.

- 3 January – Antoine-Nicolas le Sage de Fontenay, naval officer (died 1787)
- 13 February – Frederik Christian Eilschov, philosopher (died 1750)
- 14 February – Johan Cornelius Krieger, naval officer (died 1797)
- 14 September – Niels Rybergm businessman (died 1804)
- 16 May – Peder Als, painter (died 1776)
- 31 October – Markor Rodsteen, Danish admiral (died 1681)
- 1 December – Frederik Christian Kaas, naval officer (died 1803)

== Deaths ==
- 2 October – Johannes Møller, educator and writer (born 1661)

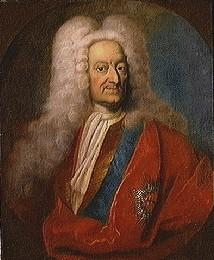
Christian von Lente.

- 2 November – Christian von Lente, statesman and diplomat (born 1649)
