= 1721 in Denmark =

- Decades: 1700s; 1710s; 1720s; 1730s; 1740s
- See also: Other events of 1721; List of years in Denmark

Events from the year 1721 in Denmark.

== Incumbents ==
- Monarch – Frederick IV
- Grand Chancellor – Christian Christophersen Sehested, Ulrik Adolf Holstein

== Events ==
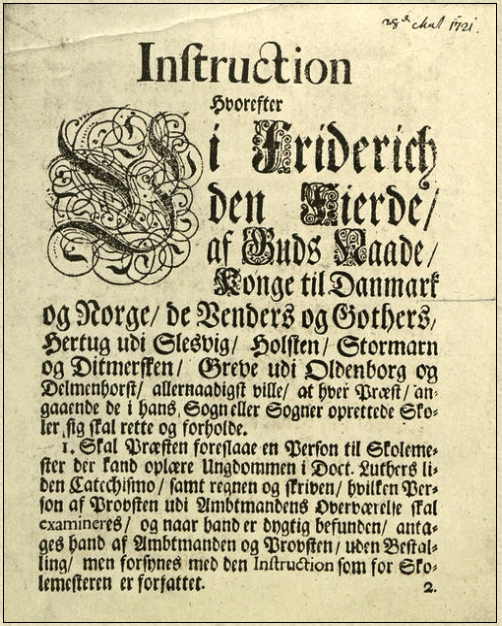
The beginning of the instructions to the local priest regarding the establishment of Frederick IB's Royal Schools.

March

- 15 March – Wueen Louise dies in Copenhagen and is buried in Roskilde Cathedral.
- 28 March – Frederick IV issues a set of instructions to the church inspector, county governor, pastor and schoolmaster regarding the establishment of Frederick IV's Royal Schools (aka cavalry schools).

April

- 3 April – The funeral of Queen Louise takes place at Roskilde Cathedral.
- 4 April – Frederick IV marries Anne Sophie Reventlow a second time. This time, the wedding is formal and conducted with grand ceremony. It is still considered a scandal by Danish nobility and foreign diplomats alike.

August

- 7 August – The wedding of Crown Prince Christian and Sophie Magdalene of Brandenburg-Kulmbach takes place at Pretzsch Castle in Saxony.

=== Undated ===
- The French theater company of the royal court, La troupe du Roi de Danemark is dissolved.

== Births ==
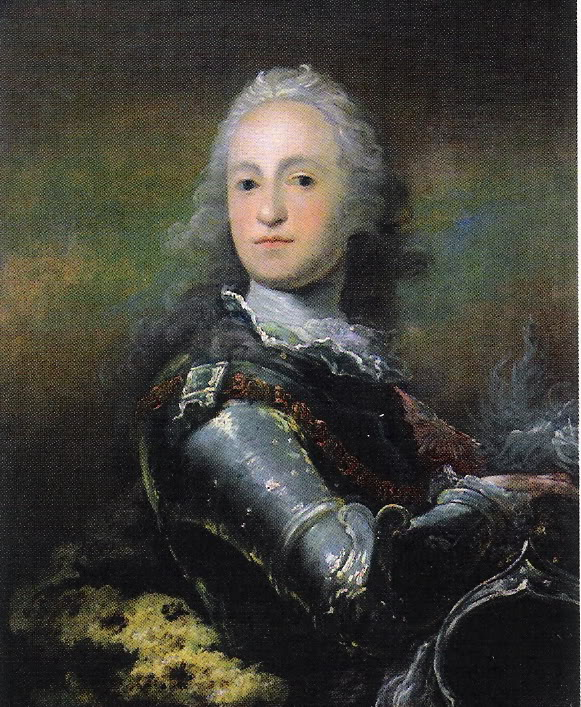
Frederick Christian I, Duke of Schleswig-Holstein-Sonderburg-Augustenburg.

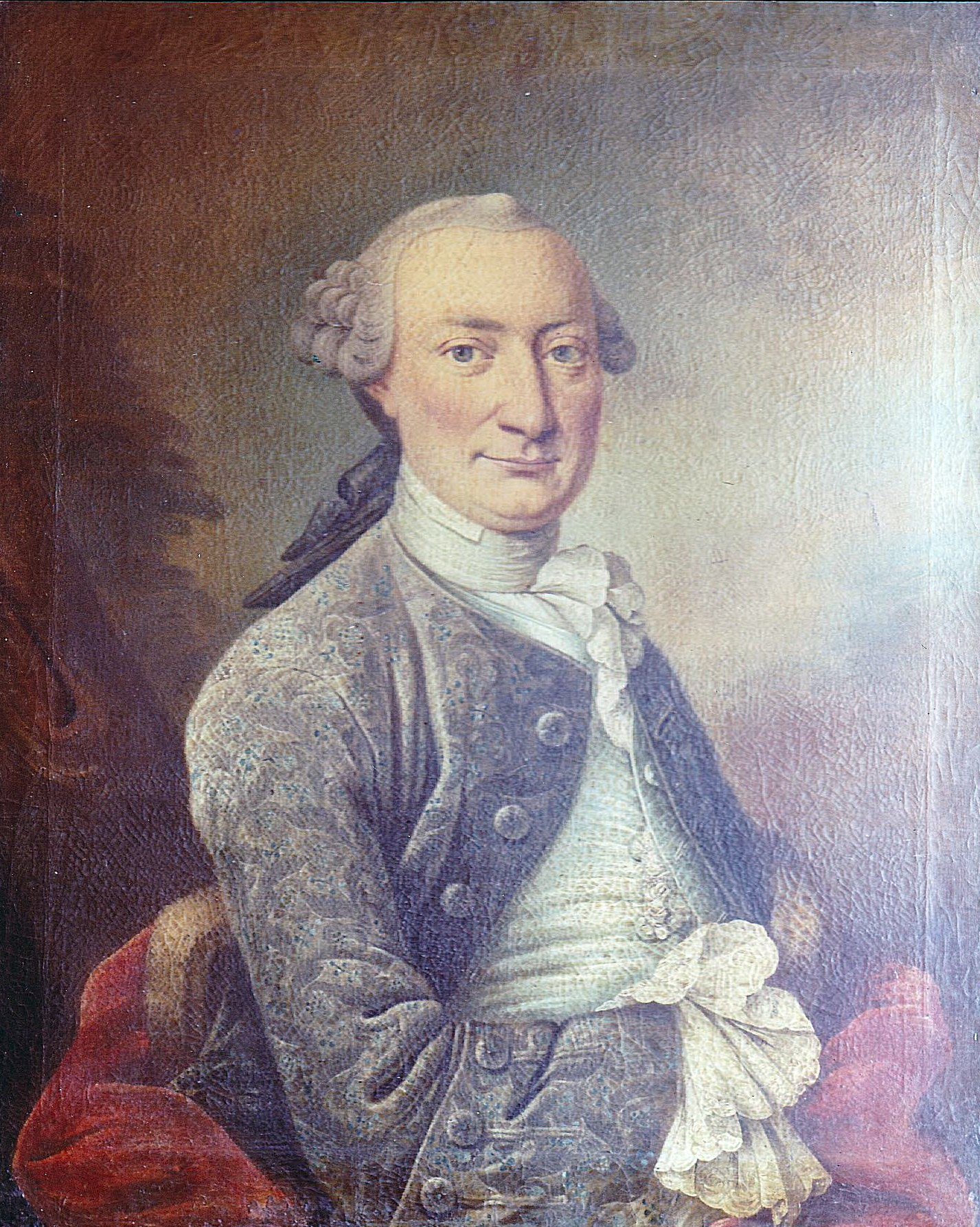
Jens Michelsen Beck.

- 1 January – Jens Michelsen Beck, surveyor, cartographer, landowner and planter (died 1791)
- 11 January – Anna Magdalena Godiche, publisher (died 1781)
- 6 April – Frederick Christian I, Duke of Schleswig-Holstein-Sonderburg-Augustenburg, duke (died 1804)

== Deaths ==
- 15 March – Louise of Mecklenburg-Güstrow, Queen consort of Denmark (born 1667 in Germany)
- 7 November – Jobst von Scholten, military officer and engineer (born 1647 in the Netherlands)
