= 1718 in Denmark =

- Decades: 1690s; 1700s; 1710s; 1720s; 1730s
- See also: Other events of 1718; List of years in Denmark

Events from the year 1718 in Denmark.

== Incumbents ==
- Monarch – Frederick IV
- Grand Chancellor – Christian Christophersen Sehested

== Events ==
Undated

- The Speigelberg Company perform in Denmark.

== Births ==
- 5 January – Jørgen Skeel, landowner (died 1796)

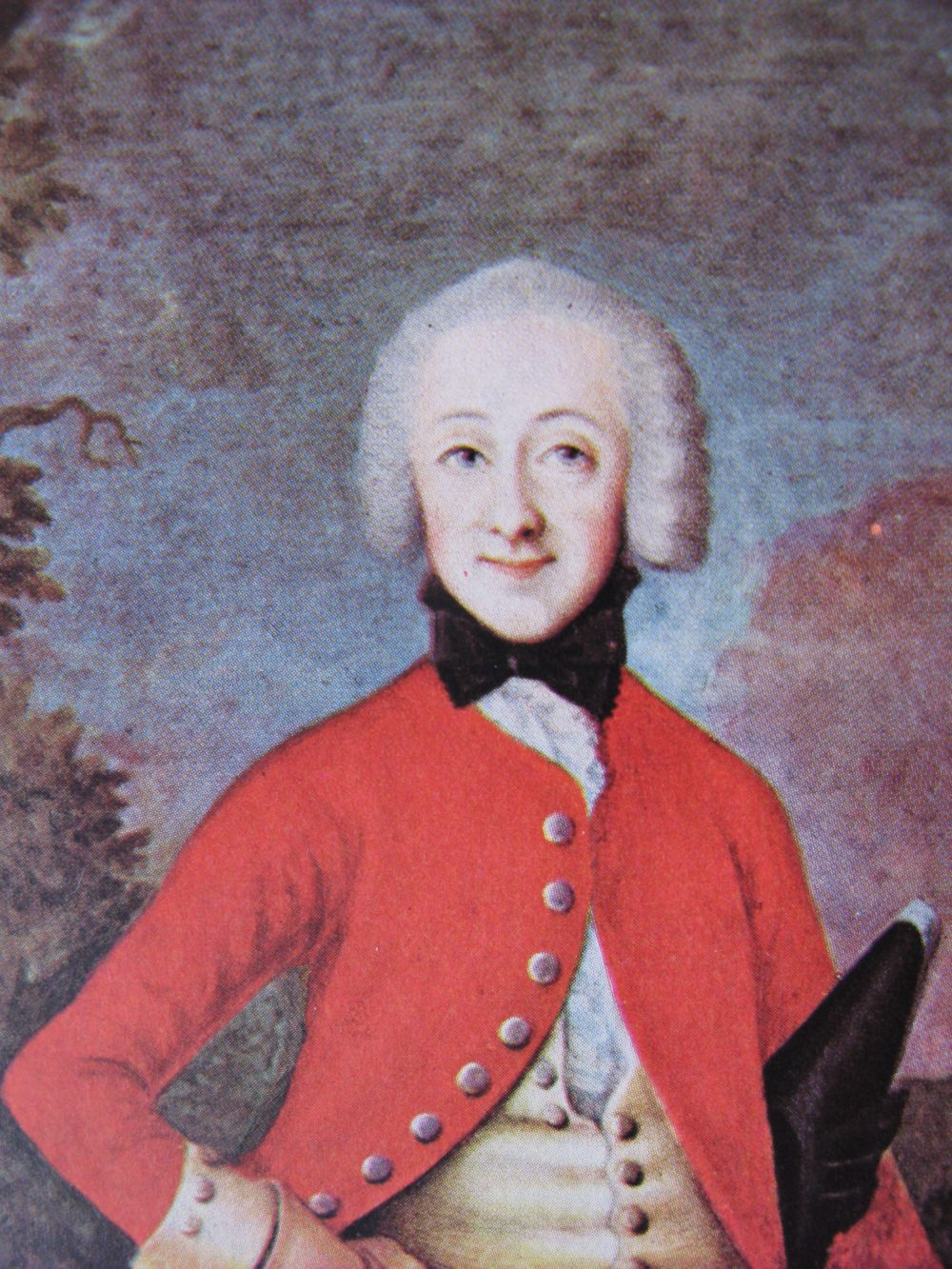
Christoffer Foltmar.

- 18 February – Søren Abildgaard, naturalist, writer and illustrator (died 1791)
- 15 April – Christian Horrebow, astronomer (died 1776)
- 17 October – Christoffer Foltmar, painter and organist (died 1759)

Undated

- Anna Klemens, witch trial victim (died 1800)

== Deaths ==
- 17 September – Valentin von Eickstedt, government official (born 1669=

=== Full date missing ===
- Marie Grubbe, noble (born 1643)
