= 1722 in Denmark =

- Decades: 1700s; 1710s; 1720s; 1730s; 1740s
- See also: Other events of 1722; List of years in Denmark

Events from the year 1722 in Denmark.

== Incumbents ==
- Monarch – Frederick IV
- Grand Chancellor – Ulrik Adolf Holstein

== Events ==
- 27 November – A consortium is granted royal permission to establish Store Kongensgade Faience Manufactury in Copenhagen.

=== 'Undated ===
- Store Kongensgade Faience Manufactury opens in Copenhagen with a monopoly on production of faience with blue decorations.
- The Lille Grønnegade Theatre in Copenhagen, the first public theater in Denmark, is opened.
- Johan Pistorius is executed on Nytorv in Copenhagen and is the last person to be legally executed for witchcraft in Denmark.
- HDMS Dronning Anna Sophia is launched at Nyholm in Copenhagen.

== Births ==
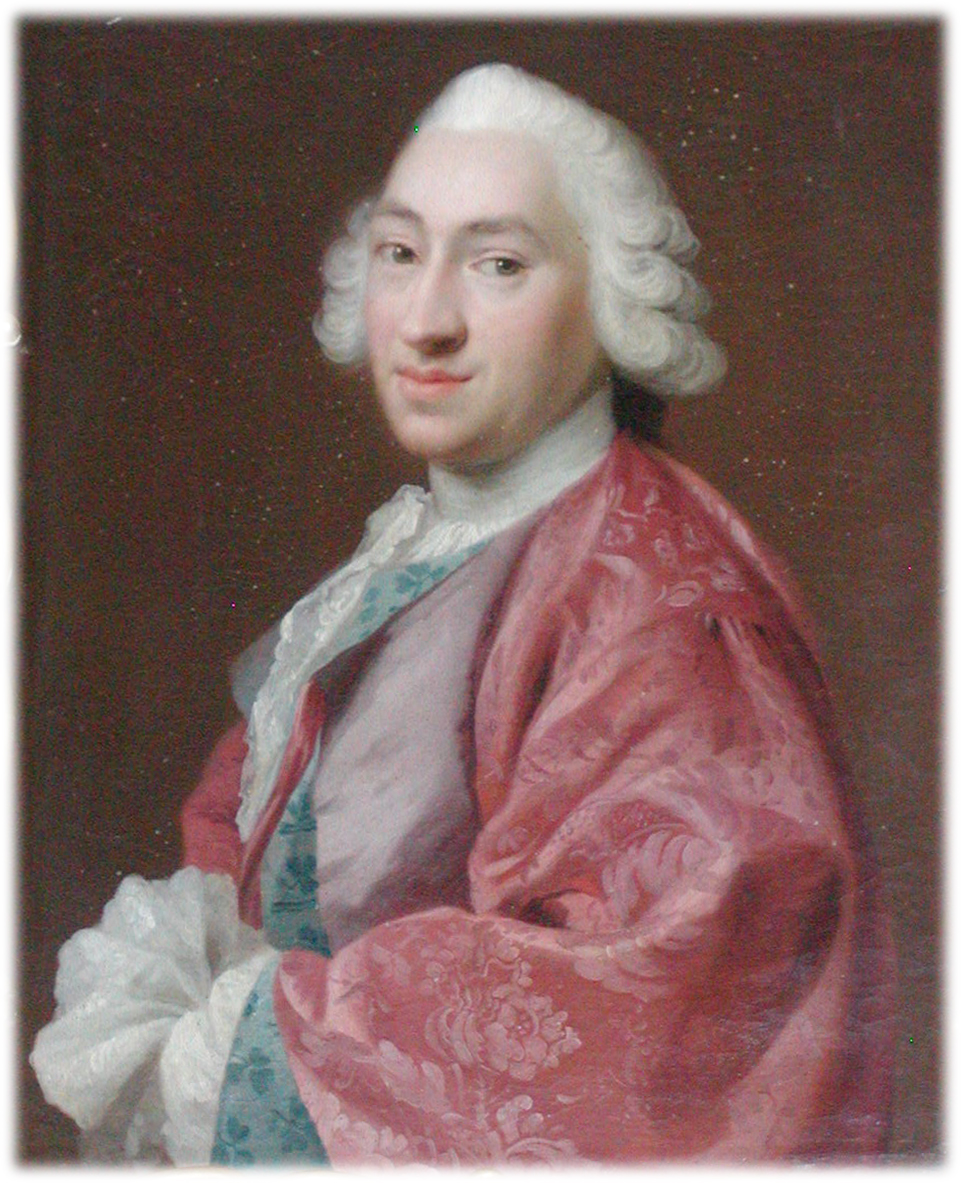
Eggert Christopher Knuth.

- 11 June – Hans Christopher Hersleb, burgermaster of Copenhagen (died 1788))
- 2 September – Vigilius Eriksen, painter (died 1782)
- 20 October – Eggert Christopher Knuth, landowner, Supreme Court justice and county governor (died 1776)

=== Fill date missing ===
- Lars Dalager, businessman /died 1772)

== Deaths ==
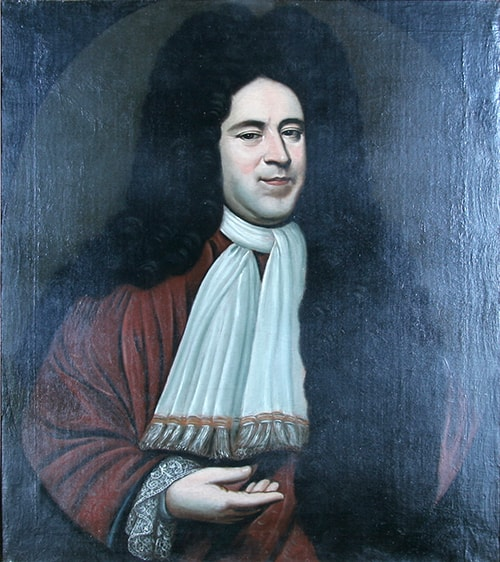
Johan Bertram Ernst.

- 18 July – Gerhard Schøning, historian (born 1722 in Norway)
- 7 September – Carl von Ahlefeldt, statesman (born 1670)
- 22 November – Benoît Le Coffre, painter (born 1781)
- 22 December – Johan Bertram Ernst, chief of police in Copenhagen (born 173)

Undated

- Benoît Le Coffre, painter to the Danish Court (born 1671)
- Dorte Jensdatter, murdered on accusations of witchcraft (born 1672)
- Johan Pistorius, grenadier and alleged witch
