= 1719 in Denmark =

- Decades: 1690s; 1700s; 1710s; 1720s; 1730s
- See also: Other events of 1719; List of years in Denmark

Events from the year 1719 in Denmark.

== Incumbents ==
- Monarch – Frederick IV
- Grand Chancellor – Christian Christophersen Sehested

== Events ==
=== Undated ===
- The first lottery in Denmark is held. The prizes are royal land lots.

== Births ==
- 19 January – Bartholomæus de Cederfeld, county governor (died 1783)
- 22 May – Otto von Rantzau, government official (died 1768)
- 23 October – Peter Fenger (died 1774)

== Deaths ==
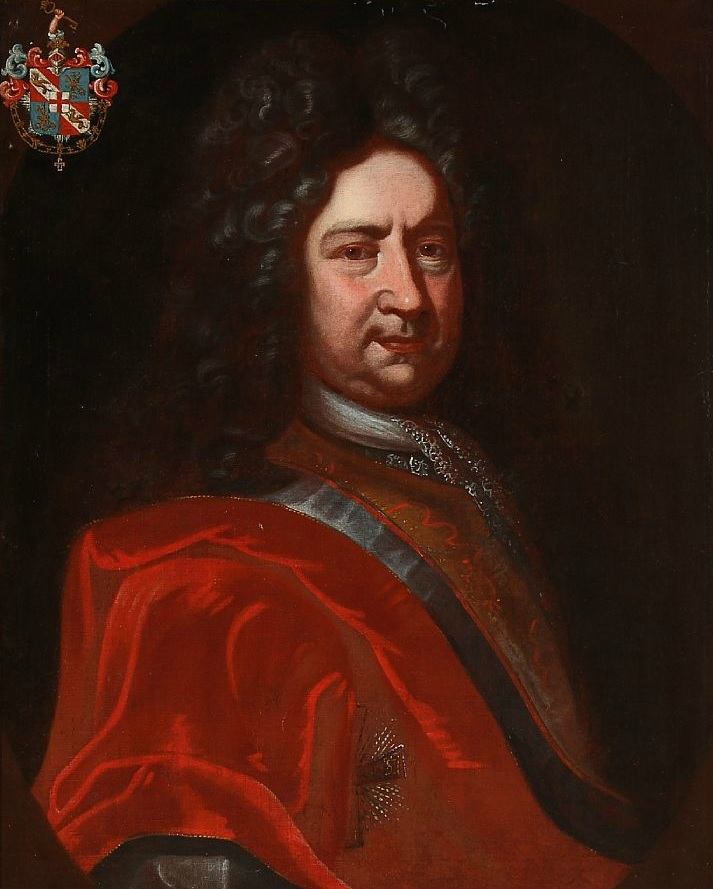
Caspar Schøller.

- 17 January – Sophie Amalie Moth, royal mistress (born 1654)
- 22 September – Hans Schack, 2nd Count of Schackenborg (born 1676)
- 11 November – Johan Otto Raben, lord chamberlain and county governor (born 1646)
- 29 December– Caspar Schøller, president of the Supreme Court (born 1644)
