= Andreas Marschall =

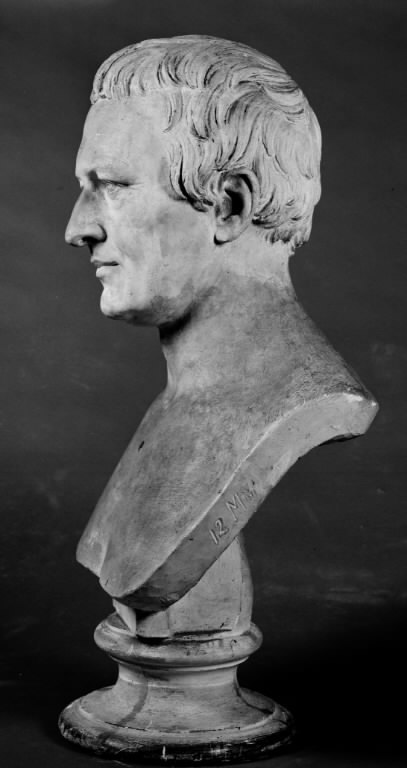
Bust of Andreas Marschall by Herman Wilhelm Bissen

Andreas Marschall (15 November 1783 – 9 February 1842) was a piano builder. He operated a piano factory in Copenhagen from 1812 and until his death in 1842.

== Biography ==
Marschall was born in Trnava, Hungary. He later worked as a cabinetmaker at various piano factories in Germany.

After moving to Copenhagen in 1810 he initially worked for around a year for instrument maker Peter Christian Uldahl before starting his own piano workshop in 1812. It developed into the leading manufacturer in Denmark of its time. In 1825–26, Marschall installed the country's first hot air-ventilation system to speed up the process of drying the lumber needed for construction of his instruments.

== Personal life ==
On 20 January 1813, Marschall married Anna Marie Bagger (29 July 1795 – 19 February 1844) in Trinitatis Church in Copenhagen. He was later hit by decease and died on 9 February 1842 in the psychological hospital in Slesvig. The factory closed in connection with his death.
