= 1720 in Denmark =

- Decades: 1700s; 1710s; 1720s; 1730s; 1740s
- See also: Other events of 1720; List of years in Denmark

Events from the year 1720 in Denmark.

== Incumbents ==
- Monarch – Frederick IV
- Grand Chancellor – Christian Christophersen Sehested

== Events ==
- 8 April – The County of Gyldensteen on Funen is established by Jean Henri Huguetan Gyldensteen from the manors of Gyldensteen, Sandagergård, Oregård, Hugget, Harritslevgård, Uggerslevgård and Jerstrup.
- 3 July – The Treaty of Frederiksborg is signed at Frederiksborg Castle, ending the Great Northern War.

== Births ==
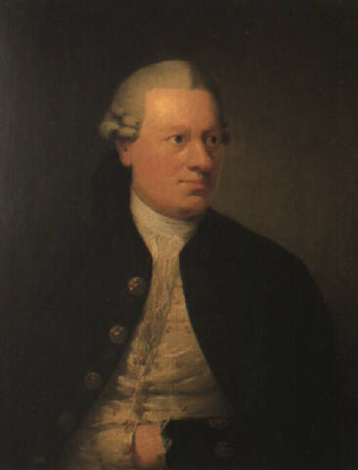
Hans Diderik Brinck-Seidelin,

- 4 January – Henrik Fisker (died 1797)
- 1 August – Hans Diderik Brinck-Seidelin, Supreme Court justice and landowner (died 1778)

=== Undated ===
- Johannes Rach, painter (died 1783 in the Dutch East Indies)
- Else Hansen, royal mistress (died 1784)

== Deaths ==
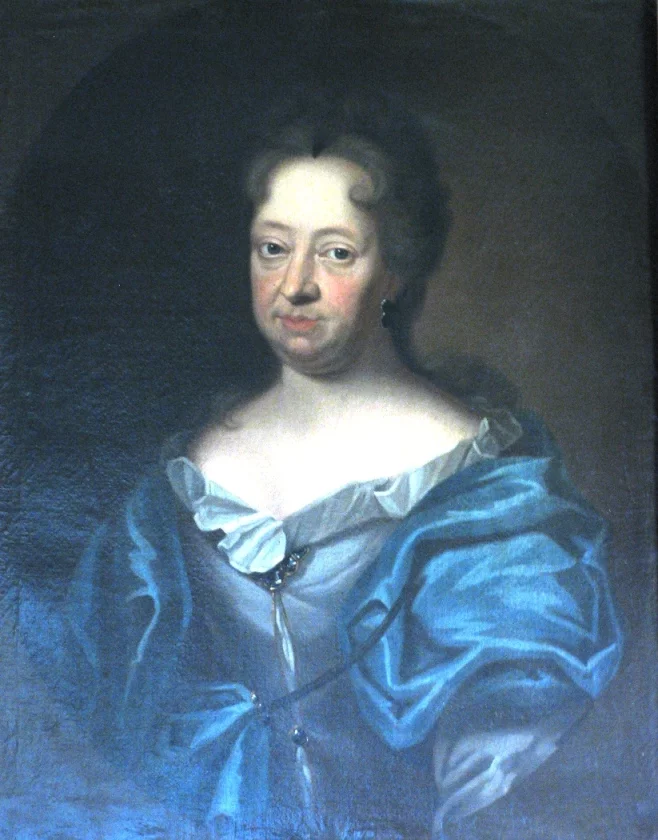
Berte Skeel.

- 20 January – Axel Juel, governor of Danish India (born 1655)
- 5 July – Berte Skeel, noblewoman (born 1644)
