= 1776 in Denmark =

- Decades: 1750s; 1760s; 1770s; 1780s; 1790s
- See also: Other events of 1776; List of years in Denmark

Events from the year 1776 in Denmark.

== Incumbents ==
- Monarch – Christian VII
- Prime minister – Ove Høegh-Guldberg

== Events ==
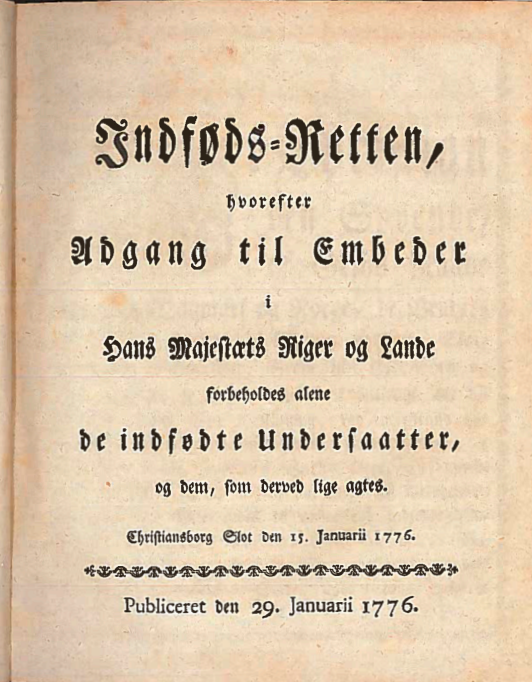
Front page of Indfødsretsforordningen

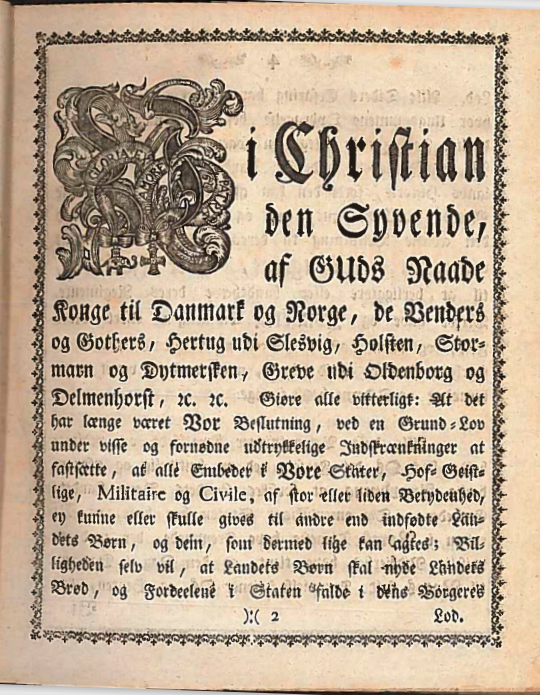
First page of the act

- 15 January – The Danish Citizenship Act of 1776 reserves state offices for Danish, Norwegian and Holstein citizens.
- 22 November – Frederik Bargum's revived Danish West India Company is liquidated.

=== Undated ===
- HDMS Indfødsretten is launched at the Royal Danish Dockyard in Copenhagen.
- Roskildevej is constructed across Frederiksberg Hill as a direct continuation of Vesterbrogade, with the effect that it passes Valby by to the detriment of the inn and other businesses.
- The King's Club is founded in Copenhagen.

== Births ==
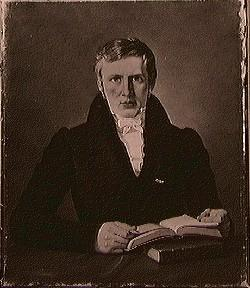
Peter Erasmus Müller.

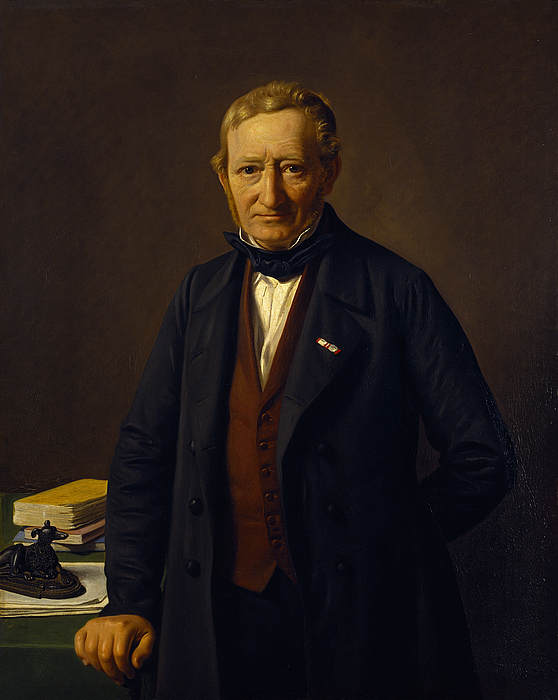
Jonas Collin.

=== January–March ===
- 6 January – Jonas Collin, philanthropist (died 1861)
- 20 February – Niels Bang, landowner (died 1815)
- 29 May – Peter Erasmus Müller, bishop (died 1834)

=== July–September ===
- 5 August – Urban Jürgensen, clockmaker (died 1830)
- 12 August – Henriette Danneskiold-Samsøe, landowner and businesswoman (died 1843)
- 14 August – Prince Christian of Hesse, prince (died 1814)
- 27 August – Barthold Georg Niebuhr, Danish-German politician and banker (died 1831)
- 8 September – Heinrich Meldahl, architect and industrialist (died 1840)

=== October–December ===
- 22 October – Johan Caspar Mylius, military officer and landowner (died 1852)

== Deaths ==
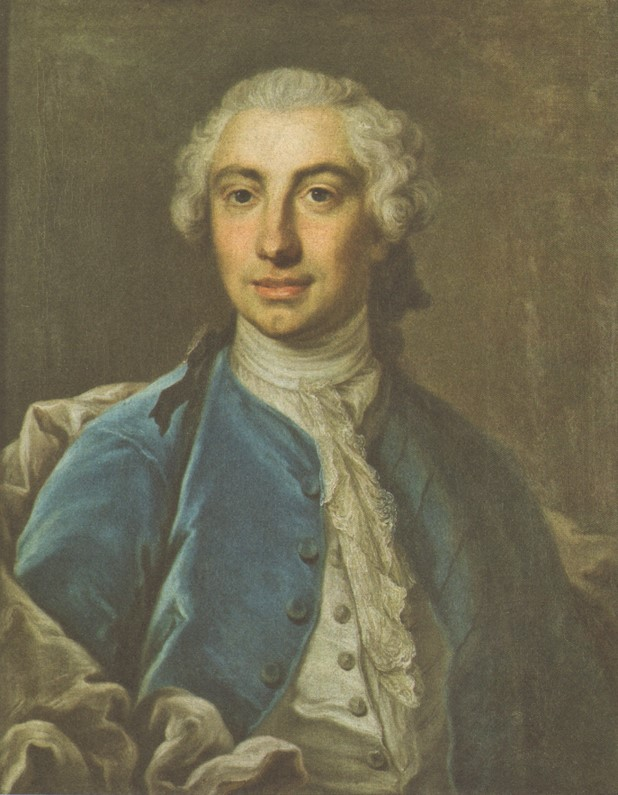
Jens Krag-Juel-Vind.

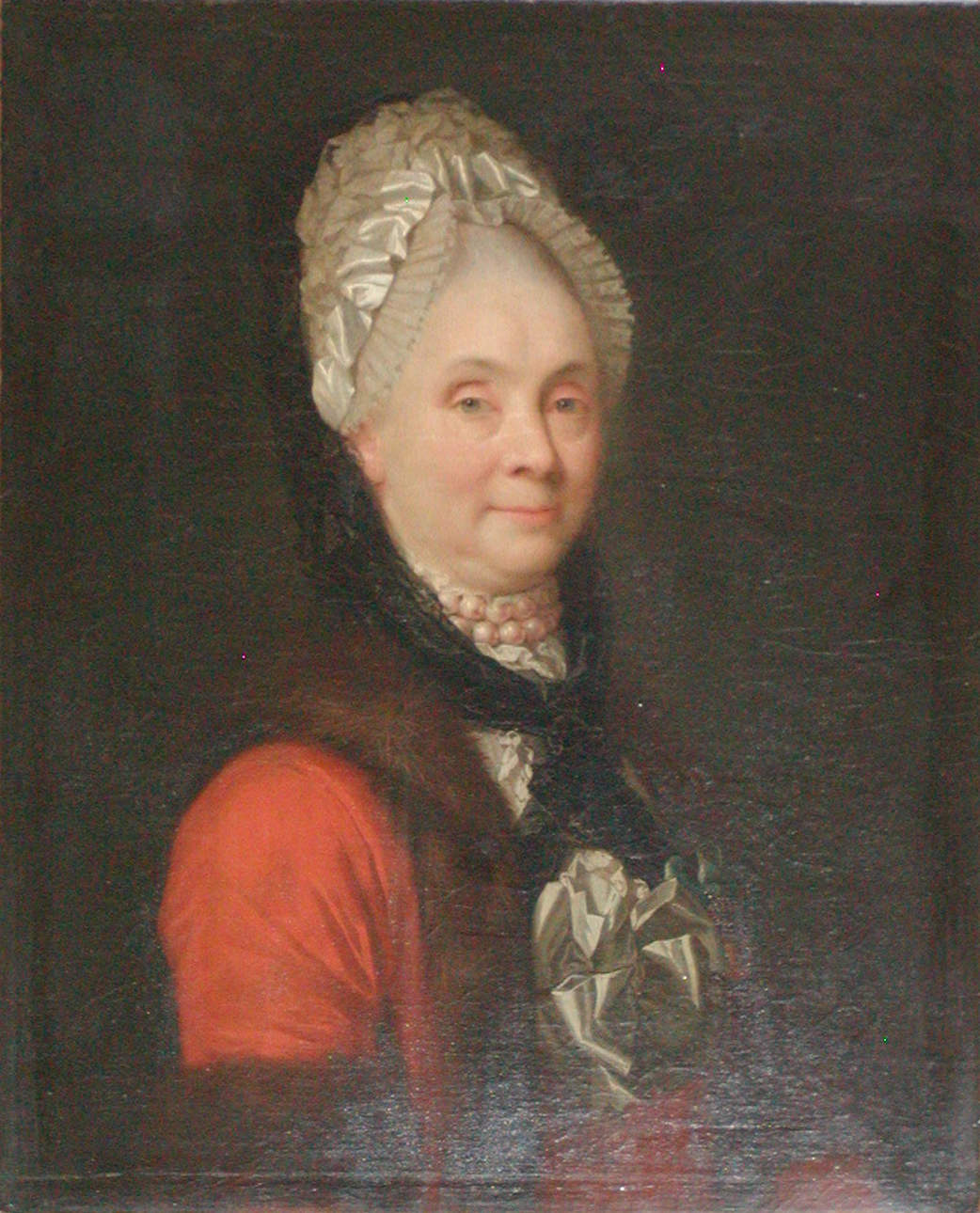
Margrethe Marie Thomasine Numsen.

=== January–March ===
- 26 February – Eggert Christopher Knuth, landowner, Supreme Court justice and county governor (died 1722)

=== April–June ===
- 9 April – Severin Leopoldus Løvenskiold, landowner (born 1719 in Norway)
- 17 April – Ludvig Ferdinand Rømer, businessman (born 1714)
- 22 April – Johann Adolf Scheibe, composer (born 1708)
- 30 April – Jens Krag-Juel-Vind, Supreme Court justice and landowner (died 1724)

=== July–September ===
- 4 June – Johann Gottfried Rosenberg architect (born 1709)
- 8 July – Peder Als, painter (born 1725)
- 15 September – Christian Horrebow, astronomer (born 1718)

=== October–December ===
- 8 October – Margrethe Marie Thomasine Numsen, courtier (born 1705)
- 9 October – Christian Jacobsen Drakenberg, sailor and hustler (born in Norway)
- 23 Bivember – Gustav Frederik Holck-Winterfeldt, landowner and government official (born 1733)

== Publications ==
- Otto Friedrich Müller: Zoologiae Danicae prodromus
