= 1724 in Denmark =

- Decades: 1700s; 1710s; 1720s; 1730s; 1740s
- See also: Other events of 1724; List of years in Denmark

Events from the year 1724 in Denmark.

== Incumbents ==
- Monarch – Frederick IV
- Grand Chancellor – Ulrik Adolf Holstein

== Events ==
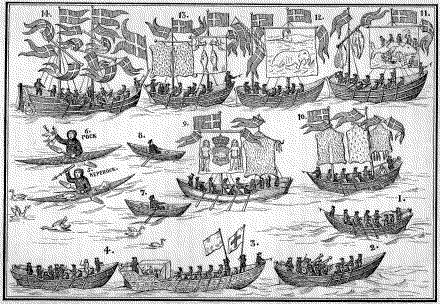
The Greenland Parade in Copenhagen on 9 November

- 9 November – At the Greenland Parade, two Greenlandic Inuit, Pock and Keperock, who had been sent to Copenhagen by Hans Egede earlier that year, are presented to the general public when they sail through the canals around Christiansborg Palace in their kayaks accompanied by barges with musicians and dignitaries.

=== Undated ===
- * The Central Guardhouse on Kongens Nytorv in Copenhagen is built. In 1874 it is moved to Kastellet.
- Frederik Rostgaard is banished from the Royal Court in Copenhagen after accusations of corruption and withdraws to Krogerup Manor north of the city.
- The Faroe Islands detach from rule of Denmark–Norway.

== Culture ==
=== Art ===
- The Royal Greenland Trading Department charges Bernhard Grodtschilling with painting a double portrait of Pooq and Qiperoq. It is the following year handed over to the Kunstkammeret.
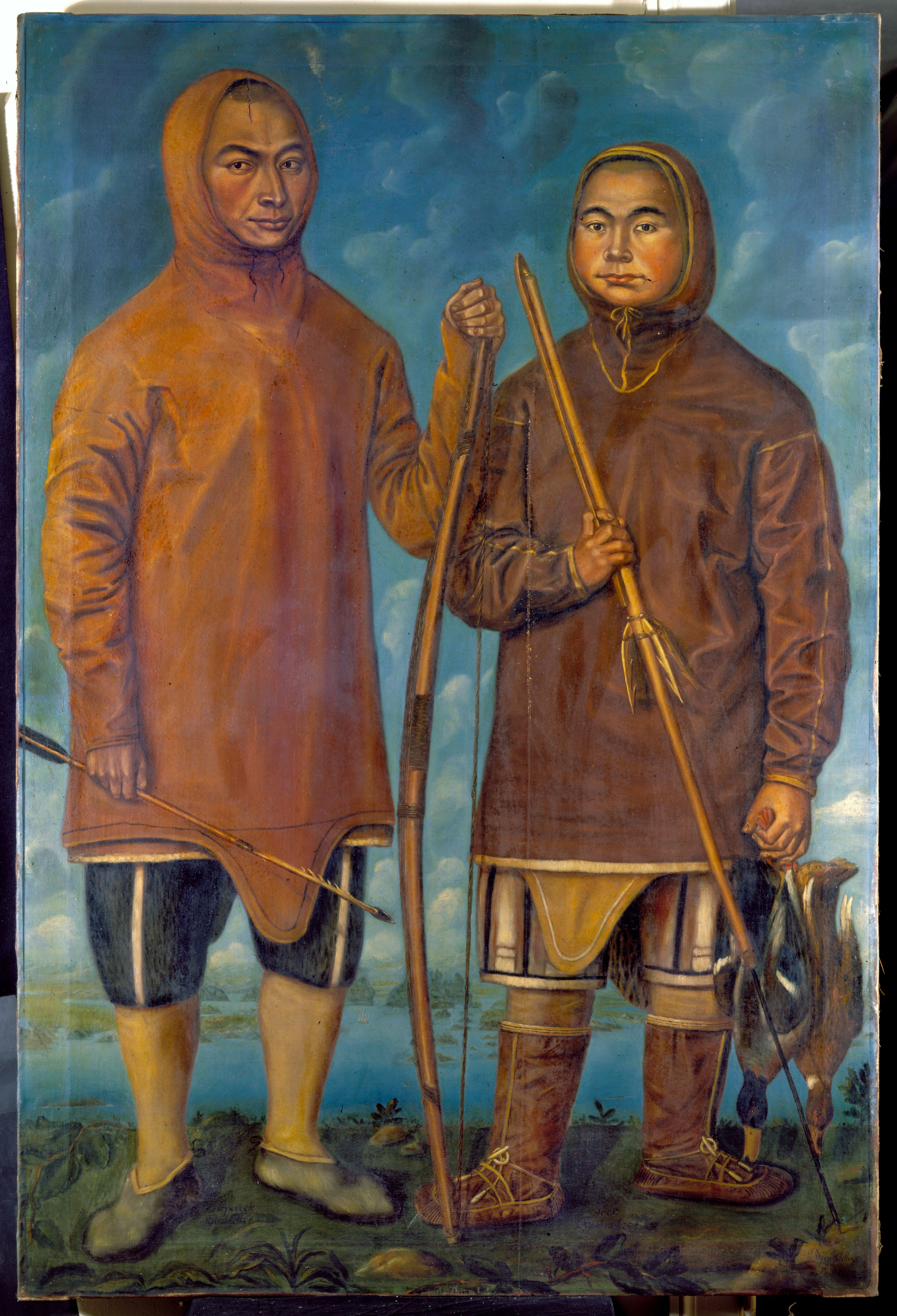
Bernhard Grodtschilling's double portrait of Pooq and Qiperoq

== Births ==
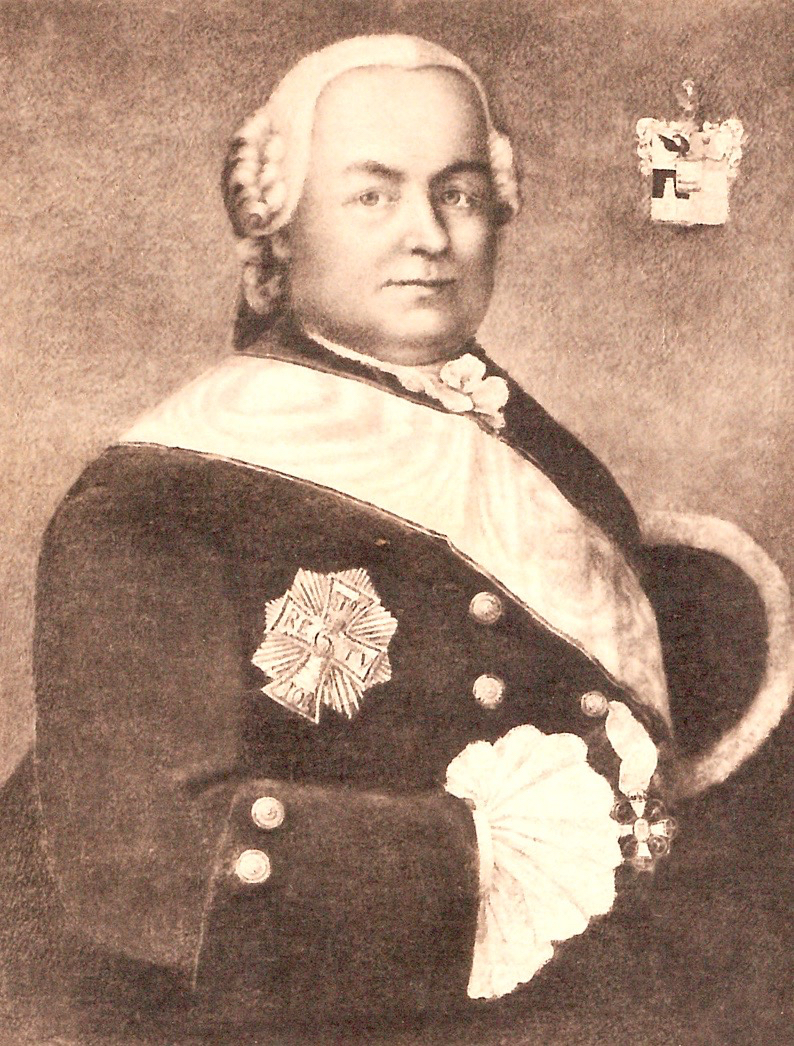
Frederik Adeler,

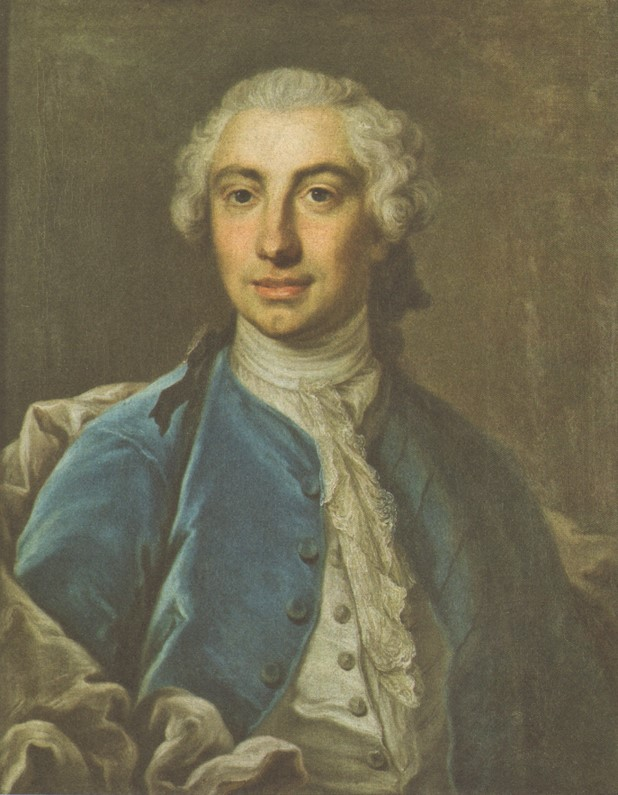
Jens Krag-Juel-Vind.

- 19 January – Frederik Christian Rosenkrantz, statesman and landowner (died 1802)
- 24 January – Christen Brun-Lundegaard, colonial administrator (born c. 1648)
- 15 June – Jens Krag-Juel-Vind, Supreme Court justice and landowner (died 1776)
- 10 August – Frederik Berregaardm government official and landowner (died 1757)
- 22 August – Jens Schielderup Sneedorff, author, professor of political science and royal teacher (died 1764)

== Deaths ==
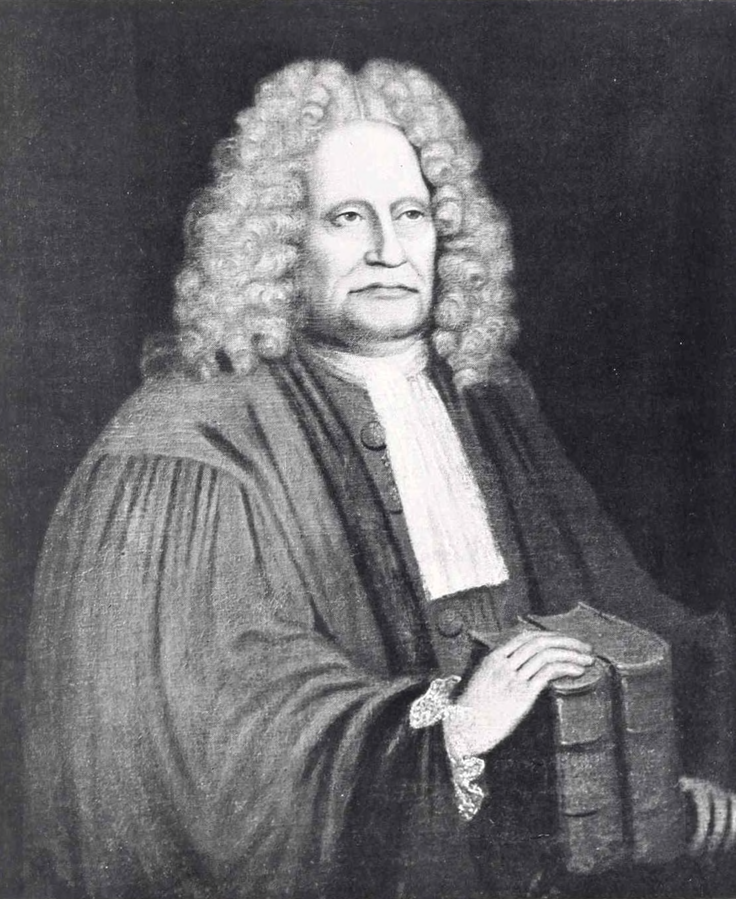
Johannes Christensen Meller.

- 24 January – Christen Brun-Lundegaard, colonial administrator (born c. 1648)
- 16 July – Jacob Coning, painter (born c. 1647)
- 1o November – Johannes Christensen Meller, Head of Copenhagen's Civil Huard and President of Copenhagen's Magistracy (born c. 1650)
