= Beck Grove, U.S. Virgin Islands =

Beck Grove
- Village
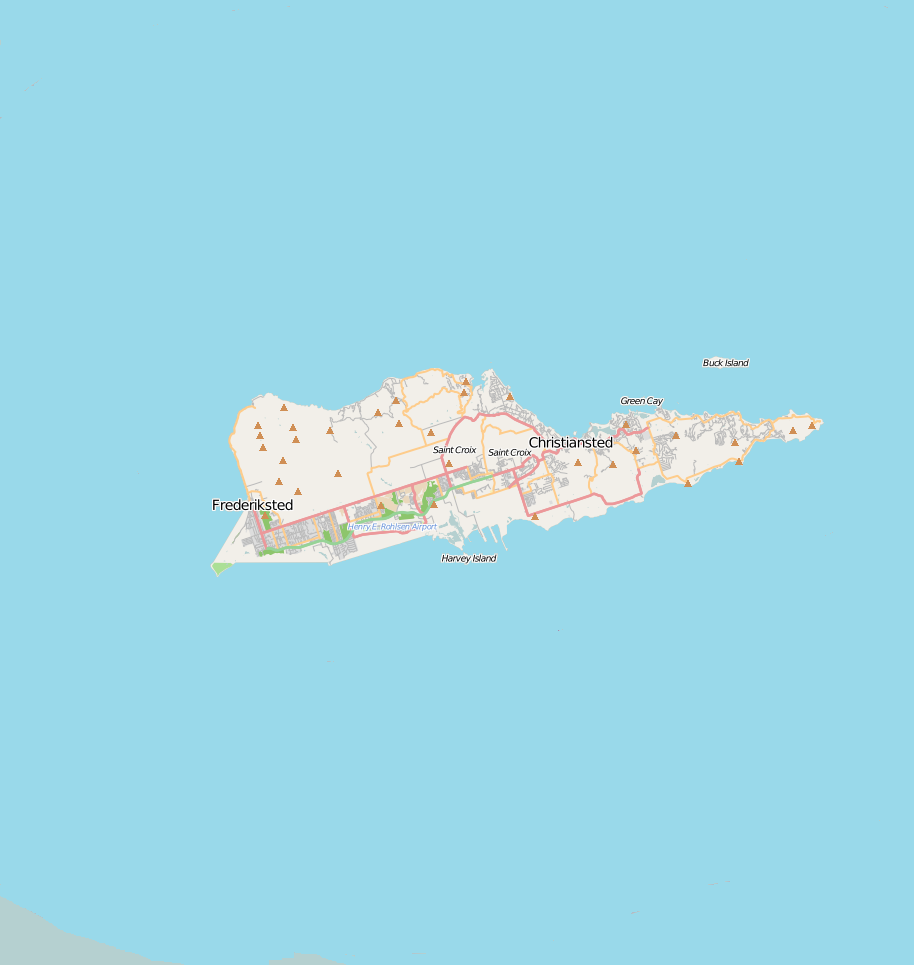
- Location in Saint Croix, United States Virgin Islands
- Coordinates: 17°43′31″N 64°51′01″W
- Country: United States Virgin Islands
- Island: Saint Croix
- Time zone: UTC-4 (AST)

Beck Grove is a former plantation which is the location of a few houses on the island of Saint Croix in the United States Virgin Islands.

== History ==
=== 18th century ===
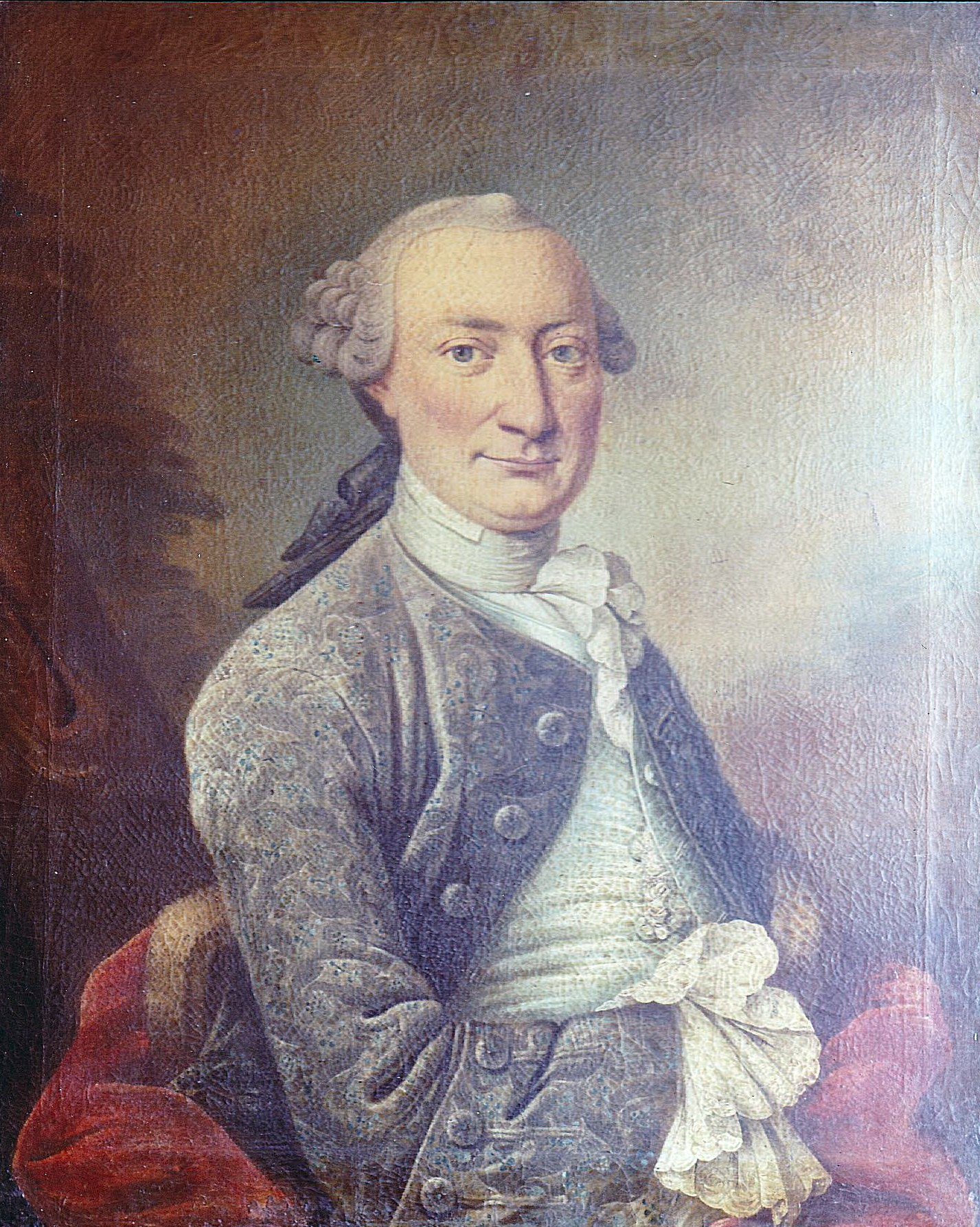
Jens Michelsen Beck

Jens Michelsen Beck (1721–1791) settled on Saint Croix in 1742 and was employed by the Danish West India Company. as chief surveyor for the island. He created the first town plan for the city of Frederiksted as well as one of the most frequently reproduced historical maps of Saint Croix.

In 1750, he invested in plantation land on the western part of the island, establishing Beck's Grove. In 1754, Beck returned to Denmark, leaving the management of Beck's Grove in the hands of an over seer, Adam Søbøtker. Beck's son Michael returned to the island to take over the plantation but died shortly thereafter in a hurricane which destroyed many of the buildings, crops and forest. In 1787, Beck decided to sell the estate.

=== 19th century ===
In 1816, Beck Grove (Princes Quarter No. 9 and Westend Quarter No. 27, 28, Centre Police District, Frederiksteds Jurisdiction) covered 310 acres of land of which 150 acres were planted with sugar canes and 160 acres were under other cultivation. 125 enslaved labourers were present on the estate. On 19 October 1821, in accordance with Robert Nielsen's testament, Beck Grove passed to Jane Mathilde Nielsen as part of an endowment of Ps. 700. On 23 May 1834, it was sold by auction, together with Estate Clearmount, to Samuel Betts, for Ps. 20,000 and an annuity of Ps. 700. On 9 December 1852, it was sold by auction, to Mrs. C. Kerr, (Claremount included) for 11,000 dollars, and ab annuity of Ps. 700. On 20 June 1855, Mrs. Kerr sold the estate to H. L. Arnesen (Claremount included) for 19,000 dlrs. and an annuity of Ps. 700.
