= 1860 in Denmark =

- Decades: 1840s; 1850s; 1860s; 1870s; 1880s
- See also: Other events of 1860; List of years in Denmark

Events from the year 1860 in Denmark.

== Incumbents ==
- Monarch – Frederick VII
- Prime minister – Carl Edvard Rotwitt (until 8 February), Carl Christian Hall (from 24 February)

== Events ==
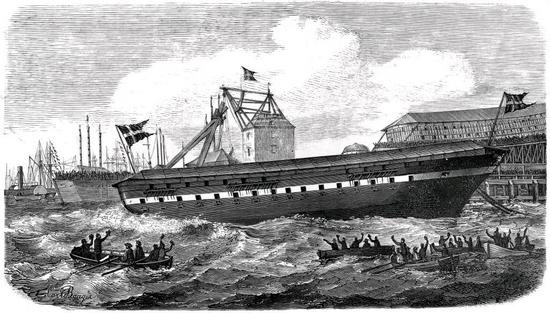
The launching of Jylland at holmen on 20 November

- 8–14 July – The 8th Scandinavian Scientist Conference is held in Copenhagen.
- 20 November – The frigate Jylland is launched at Holmen in Copenhagen.

== Births ==
- 16 July – Otto Jespersen, linguist (died 1943)
- 22 July – Paul Gustav Fischer, painter (died 1934)
- 23 July – Georg Achen, painter (died 1912)
- 13 September – Jens Jensen, landscape architect (died 1951 in USA)
- 15 December – Niels Ryberg Finsen, Nobel Prize-winning physician (died 1904)

== Deaths ==
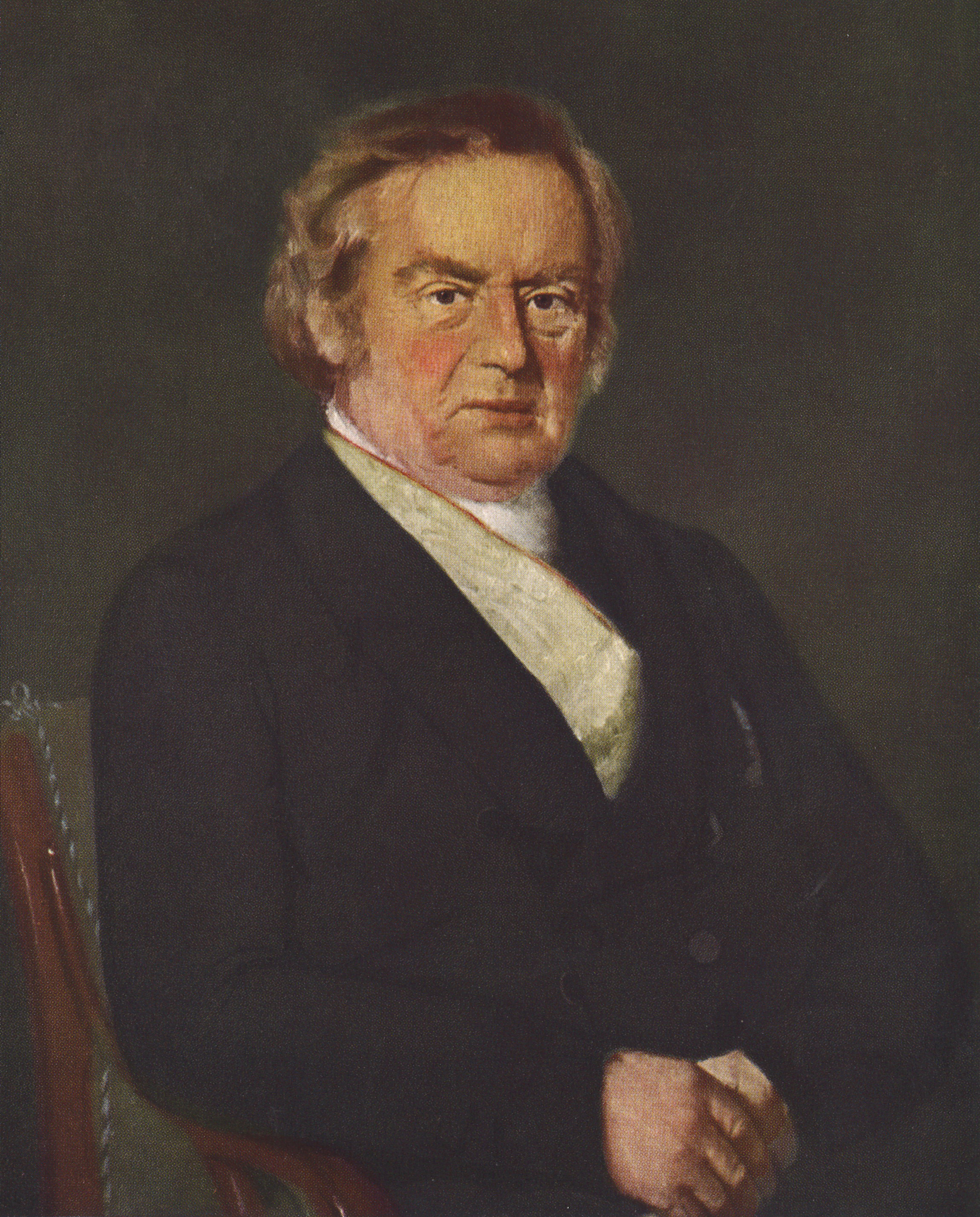
Anders Sandøe Ørsted.

- 30 January – Jørgen Hansen Koch, architect (born 1787)
- 1 May – Anders Sandøe Ørsted, jurist and politician, Prime Minister of Denmark (born 1778)
- 12 May – Gerhard Christoph von Krogh, military fficer (born 1785)
- 21 May – Johannes Frederik Fröhlich, composer and musician (born 1806)
- 25 August – Johan LudvigHeiberg, poet (born 1791)
