= 1717 in Denmark =

- Decades: 1690s; 1700s; 1710s; 1720s; 1730s
- See also: Other events of 1717; List of years in Denmark

Events from the year 1717 in Denmark.

== Incumbents ==
- Monarch – Frederick IV
- Grand Chancellor – Christian Christophersen Sehested

== Events ==
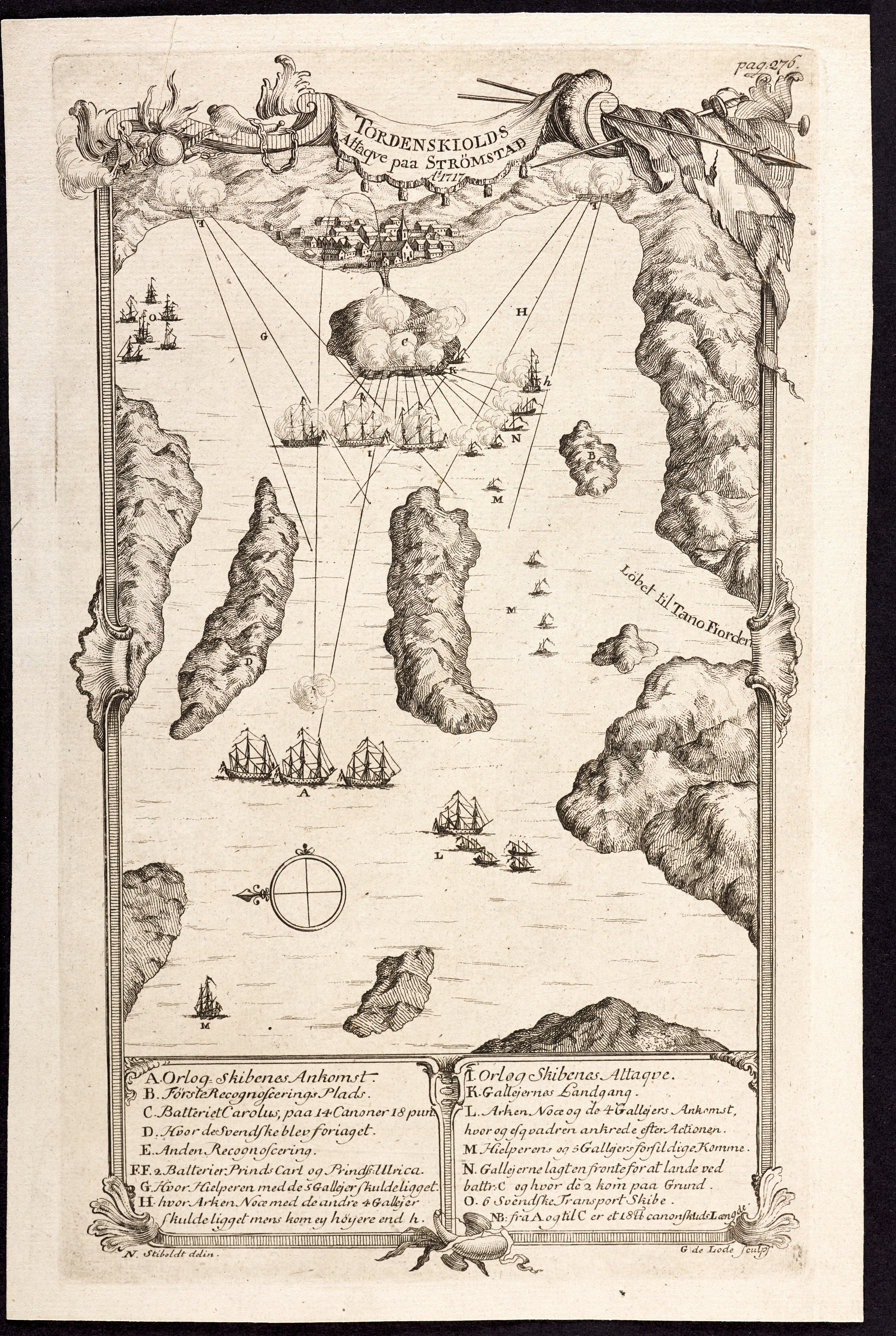
Tordenskiolds Attaque paa Strömstad Ao 1717.

- 13–14 May – Battle of Gothenburg, battle of the Great Northern War.
- 25 December – The Christmas Flood of 1717 affects the west coast of Sønderjylland.

== Undated ==
- Planters move from Saint Thomas to Saint John. leading to Denmark claiming the island in 1718.

== Births ==
- 11 March – Schack Carl Rantzau, statesman (died 1789 in France)
- 2 January – Villum Berregaard, government official and Supreme Court justice (died 1769)
- 27 October – Hans Hagerup Gyldenpalm, jurist and government official (died 1781)

== Deaths ==
- 13 April – Frederik Giedde, naval officer (born 1641)
- 1 July – Princess Anna Sophie of Denmark (born 1647)
- 21 December – Gustav Wilhelm Wedel Jarlsberg, general (born 1641)
