= 1723 in Denmark =

- Decades: 1700s; 1710s; 1720s; 1730s; 1740s
- See also: Other events of 1723; List of years in Denmark

Events from the year 1723 in Denmark.

== Incumbents ==
- Monarch – Frederick IV
- Grand Chancellor – Ulrik Adolf Holstein

== Events ==
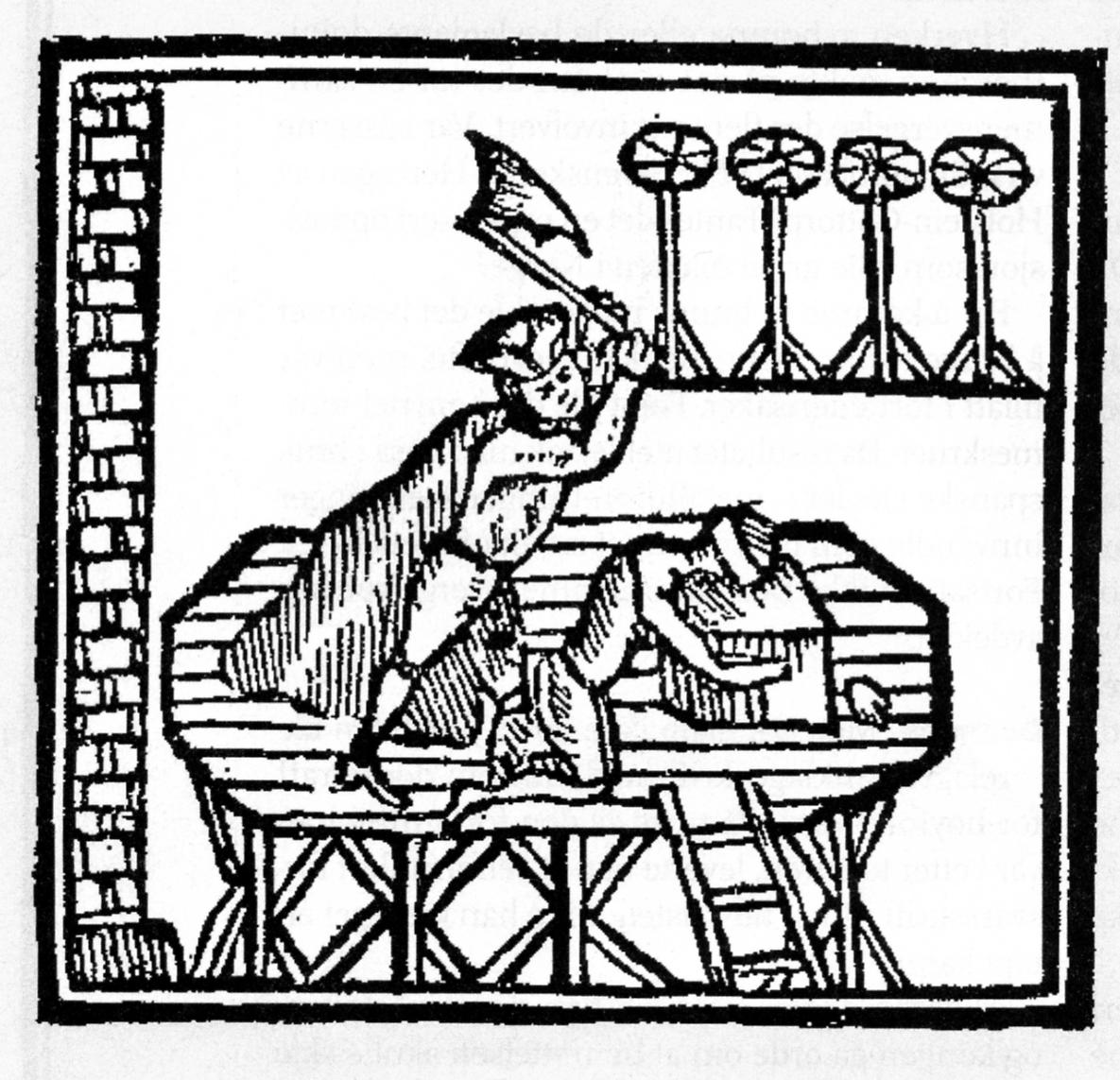
The execution of Povel Juel

- 8 March - The Norwegian civil servant and author Povel Juel is executed in Copenhagen, for his plans to depose Frederick IV as King of Norway.

== Births ==
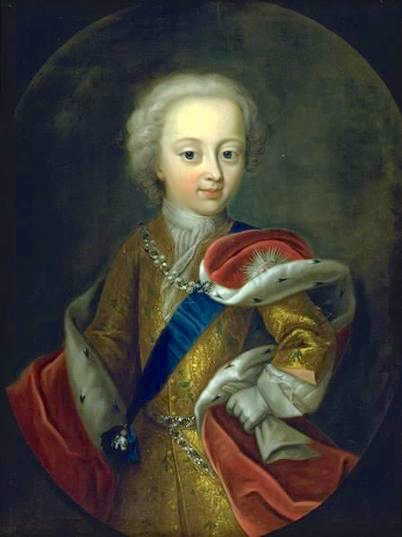
Frederick V.

- 5 January – Andreas Bodenhoff, businessman (died 1794)
- 31 March – Frederick V, king (died 1766)
- October – Hans Næss (architect), architect /died 1795=
- 23 November – Bendix Lasson Bille, naval officer (died 1784)

=== Gull date missing ===
- Severin Jensen, architect

== Deaths ==
- March 8 – Povel Juel, civil servant and writer (born 1673)

=== Full date missing ===
- Jørgen Christopher von Klenow, military officer
