= Peter Christian Uldahl =

Danish piano maker (1778-1820)

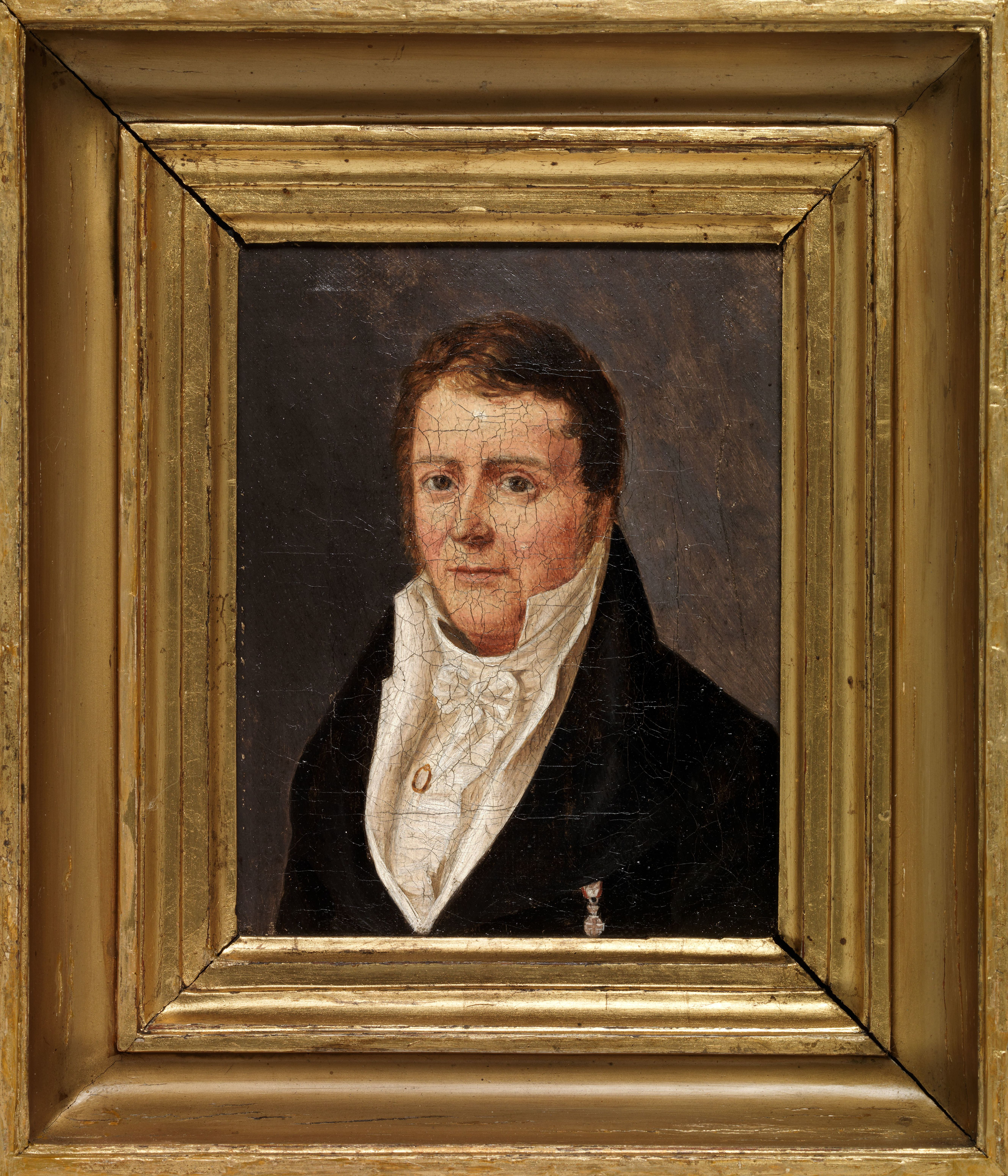
- Jacobson painted by C. A. Jensen in 1828
- Born: 1 March 1778; Assens, Denmark
- Died: 1 March 1820 (aged 41); Copenhagen, Denmark
- Known for: Piano maker

Peter Christian Uldahl (1 March 1778 - 1 March 1820) was a Danish piano maker. He started Denmark's first piano factory in Copenhagen in 1809. Just under 600 instruments left the factory during its 11 years of existence. A giraffe piano from the factory is in the collection of the Danish Music Museum.

== Early life ==
Uldahl was born in Assens on the island of Funen as the illegitimate child of maid.Birthe Jørgensdatter. In 1801, he moved to Copenhagen after having completed his apprenticeship as a joiner. Later the same year he left the country to escape military service. In Saint Petersburg, he worked for a musical instrument maker.

== Career ==
After three and a half years in Saint Petersburg, Uldahl continued to Vienna by way of Prague. In Vienna, he started out by working for piano maker Joseph Wachtl for three and a half years. He then spent half a year as manager of Brodmansk's piano factory in the same city. He was offered to take over the factory and was also proposed to settle in London or Riga but eventually decided to return to Denmark. Back in Copenhagen, in June 1809, he immediately started a piano workshop. In January 1810, he was awarded a 5000 rigsdaler loan from the Foundation ad usus publicos for the establishment of a piano factory. By November 1810, he employed 10 craftsmen and an assistant. By 1815, it had increased to 22 craftsmen and three apprentices. One of his early employees was Andreas Marschall, who went on to start his own piano factory in 1812.

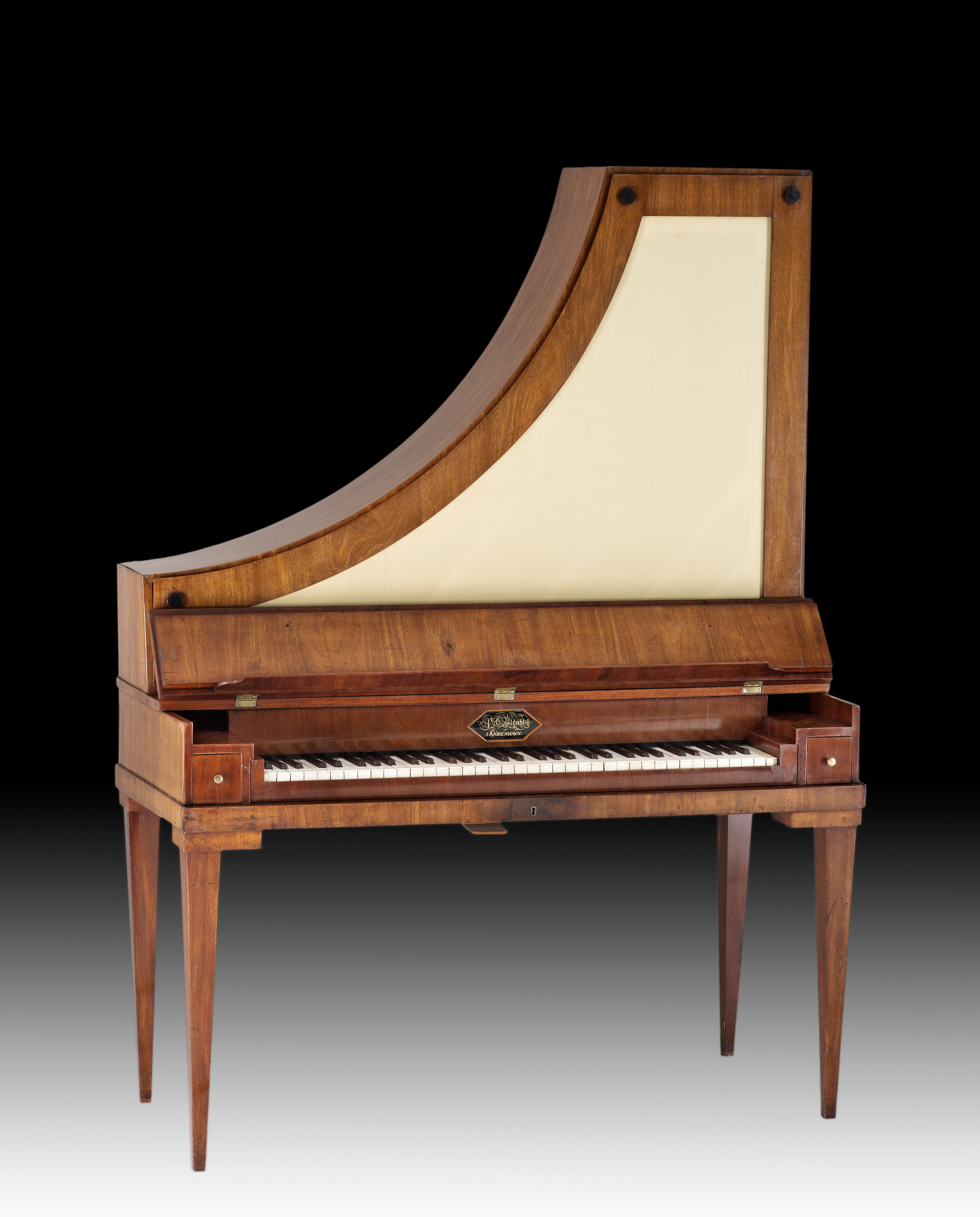
A giraffe piano from Uldahl's factory, now in the collection of the Danish Museum of Musical Instruments.

Uldahl specialized in the construction of pyramidic and giraffe pianos. In 1812, he was represented with five different models of pianos on an exhibition hosted by Selskabet for indenlandsk kunstflid. In 1817, he opened a new piano shop, but over the next years he gradually lost his position as the country's leading piano builder. In 1820, he only employed two craftsmen and one boy. The development was both a result of the difficult economic times that followed the Danish state bankruptcy in 1813 and increased competition from other manufacturers. His models were at the same time considered somewhat outdated. Uldahl died on his birthday in 1820. The factory closed in conjunction with his death.

== Personal life ==
Uldahl was married to Anna Dorothea Hammond, daughter of post master and kancelliråd Bastian H. (1732-1809) and Anna Dorothea Reiersen (1745-1826). The wedding took place on 23 November 1811 in Holmen Church.

== Legacy ==
Just under 600 pianos left the factory during its 11 years of existence. A giraffe piano from the factory is in the collection of the Danish Music Museum in Copenhagen.
