= Bendix Frantz Ludwig Schow =

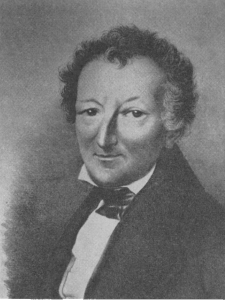
Bendix Schow, Mayor of Aabenraa 1805–1837

Bendix Frantz Ludwig Schow (20 April 1778 – 18 August 1839) was the mayor of Aabenraa from 1805 to 1837. A German-speaking member of the nobility of Schleswig-Holstein, he played an important role in a period when the rise of nationalism started to create conflicts between the German-speaking minority ruling classes and the Danish-speaking lower-classes of Schleswig.

== Early life ==
Schow was born and raised in Rendsburg in Schleswig. His father, Jørgen von Schouw, was oberst in the Danish military, serving most of his career in the duchies. Schow studied law at the university in Kiel and graduated in May 1797. He moved to Copenhagen to work an unpaid internship in Rentekammeret in 1800, and with unusual speed, got a position in the German Chancellery (Danish: Tyske Kancelli) in 1802. While in Copenhagen, he befriended Friedrich Christoph Dahlmann, later to be an important figure in the German nationalist movement to make the duchies of Schleswig and Holstein independent German states, independent of Denmark.

== Mayor of Aabenraa ==
In 1805, the 27-year-old Schow was appointed by the king as new mayor and official secretary of Aabenraa. That same year, perhaps due to his new appointment, he married Georgine Johanne Christiane Sophie Callisen (1782–1849), daughter of the general superintendent in Holstein, Johann Leonhard Callisen.

As mayor, he answered to Prince Charles of Hesse-Kassel, the royal governor of Schleswig-Holstein.

Schow showed himself to be a strong leader in the English wars, ensuring that Aabenraa had a local militia and a detachment of Danish troops, as well as helping to finance an armed ship in the harbour, a gunboat named after Princess Caroline of Denmark.

As the waves of nationalism fanned Europe, Schow found himself allied to the German liberal cause, advocating for a Constitution of the Estates for both duchies. From the 1820s, he oversaw the publication of a weekly paper with liberal views, the Allgemeines Wochenblatt. Schow was a shrewd politician who was able to maintain his position and strong connection to the Danish authorities while supporting the German liberal cause, despite the weekly paper being sanctioned for its advocacy of a constitution for the duchies.

In 1837, Schow's health began to fail, and his son who had been assisting him through illness, Georg Heinrich Leonhard Schow (1810–89), was named mayor in his place. Schow died two years later.

== Legacy ==
Today, Schow is best remembered for overseeing the building of a new courthouse, designed by Christian Frederik Hansen and completed in 1830.

== Literature ==
- Japsen, G.: Den nationale udvikling i Åbenrå 1800-1850 (The National Development in Åbenrå), Aabenraa 1961
