= Henriette Jørgensen =

Danish actress (1791–1847)

Henriette Jørgensen (1791–1847) was a Danish stage actress and translator.

Daughter of the book-keeper Gert Diderich J. and Henriette Rose. She was active as an amateur actress in Borups Selskab before she debuted at the Royal Danish Theatre in 1816. She was regarded as much talented but not beautiful, and she played the part of mother in tragedies, comedies, vaudeville and in realistic drama. She retired in 1845.

She also translated French comedies, such as Rodolphe by Eugene Scribe and Mélesville to Broder og Søster (1834).
