= Antoine-Nicolas le Sage de Fontenay =

Danish counter-admiral

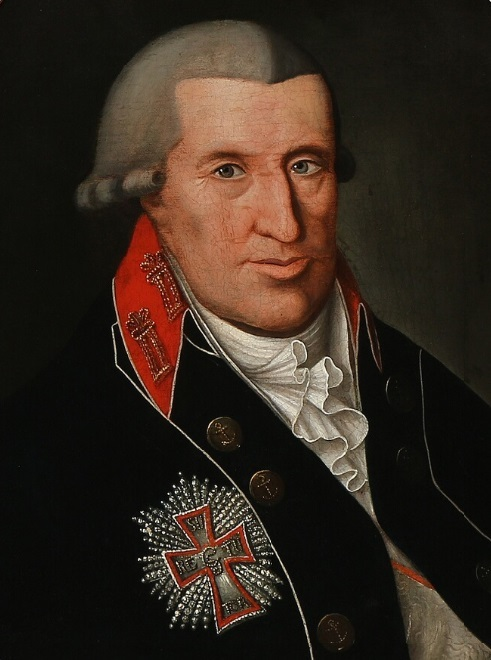
- Antoine-Nicolas le Sage de Fontenay
- Born: 3 January 1725 Copenhagen, Denmark
- Died: 19 January 1787 (aged 62) Copenhagen, Denmark
- Allegiance: Denmark
- Branch: Royal Danish Navy
- Rank: Counter admiral
- Awards: Grand Cross (1782)

Antoine-Nicolas le Sage de Fontenay, (Danish: Anthon Nicolaj; 3 January 1725, Copenhagen — 19 January 1787, Copenhagen) was a Danish counter-admiral of the 18th century.

Fontenay was enrolled in the Royal Danish Navy as a volunteer cadet at the age of five. Over the next 40 years in the Navy, he rose the ranks to become counter-admiral. During his career, he was involved in the War of the Austrian Succession and toured in the Danish East Indies and Danish West Indies.

== Career ==
Fontenay was enrolled in the Royal Danish Navy as a volunteer cadet at the age of five, as was custom at the time amongst the naval nobility. He was made a cadet in 1735, second lieutenant in 1741, first lieutenant in 1746, captain lieutenant in 1753, captain in 1755, commander-captain in 1763, commander in 1769, and counter-admiral in 1770.

From 1744 to 1747, he was in the service of the English Navy, participating in the War of the Austrian Succession. From 1751 to 1754 he was on the frigate Bornholm as second-in-command on tour in the Danish East Indies. In 1753, the Bornholm's Captain Sievers died, and Fontenay assumed command. After returning to Denmark, he became the commander of the frigate Christiansborg.

In 1755 he travelled to the Danish West Indies, on a mission to escort 150 people, mostly families, across the Atlantic. He returned to Copenhagen the next year. In 1771, he took over for command at Holmen Naval Base, after Captain Frederik Reiersen was suspended for causing unrest there. He was sent to Kristiansand in 1774 to investigate the feasibility of constructing a naval base there.

On 3 June 1778, he was naturalized as a member of the Danish nobility. In 1781, he was appointed as a deputy to the Admiralty Board, and following administrative changes, was then made deputy of the Admiralty and Commissariat Board in 1784. In 1782, he was decorated as a White Knight (Danish: Hvid Ridder) within the Order of the Dannebrog.

== Personal life ==
Antoine-Nicolas was born on 3 January 1725 in Copenhagen to Gaspar Frédéric le Sage de Fontenay (1693–1769) and Maria Magdeleine Formont de la Forêst (1701–1739). Antoine-Nicolas was named after his two grandfathers: Antoine de Fontenay and Nicolas Formont. He belonged to a family of Danish sailors of French Protestant origin from the Morvan region. His father, Gaspar, was a lieutenant when he was born, and later became an admiral. His older brother, Charles Frédéric le Sage de Fontenay (1723–1801), also went into the navy and became an admiral.

On 2 May 1758, he married Suzanna Marie van Hemert (1783—1819), who was the daughter of State Councillor Joost van Hemert. He and Suzanna Marie had six children: Elisabeth (1759–1766), Marie Magdelaine (1760–1827), Frédérique Justine (1762–1764), Susanne Antoinette (1764–1764), Gaspard Frédéric (1766–1846), and Juste (1773–1796). He died on 19 January 1787 in Copenhagen and was buried on 31 January at the French Reformed Church.
