= Benoît Le Coffre =

Danish painter

Benoit Le Coffre
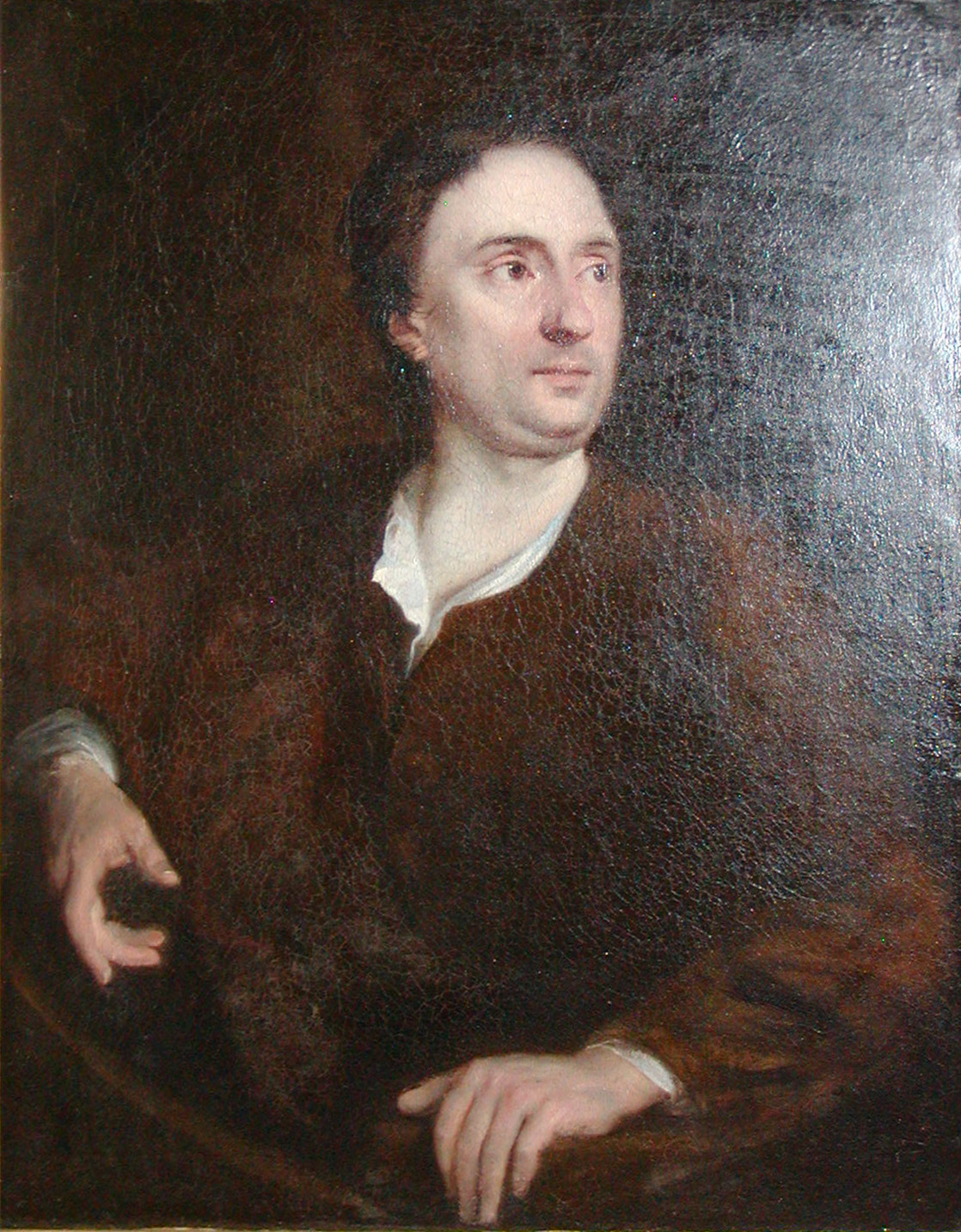
- Self-portrait
- Born: 1671; Copenhagen, Denmark
- Died: 1722 (aged 50–51); Copenhagen
- Education: École des Beaux-Arts
- Known for: Painting
- Movement: Rococo
- Awards: Prix de Rome

Benoît Le Coffre (1671 – 1722) was a Danish painter of French descent. He became King Frederick IV's Court Painter in 1700 and is considered the earliest representative of light Rococo painting in Denmark.

== Biography ==
Benoît Le Coffre was born in Copenhagen in 1671 to Claude Le Coffre who was also a painter as well as a sculptor with important commissions for the Court. Benoît was sent to Paris where he studied at the École des Beaux-Arts. He won the Prix de Rome in 1692 but seems not to have continued his studies in Rome. Little is known about his early career and whereabouts but back in Denmark in 1700 he became Frederick IV's Court Painter alongside Hendrick Krock, the king's other Court Painter.

=== Works ===
His work includes portraits as well as many decorative works for the many royal residences. At Frederiksberg Palace, which was built just after the turn of the century, he painted 12 frescos featuring both scenes from antique mythology and swarming royal masquerade balls with musicians and masked participants. Other buildings with decorative works by him include Rosenborg Castle, the Eremitage Lodge and the Chancellery building in Copenhagen.

== Gallery ==
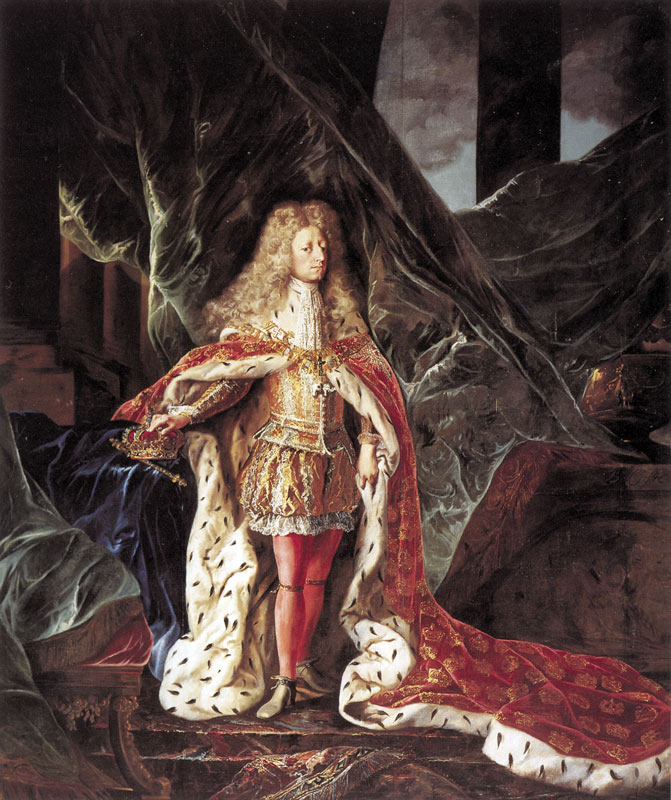
Frederick IV

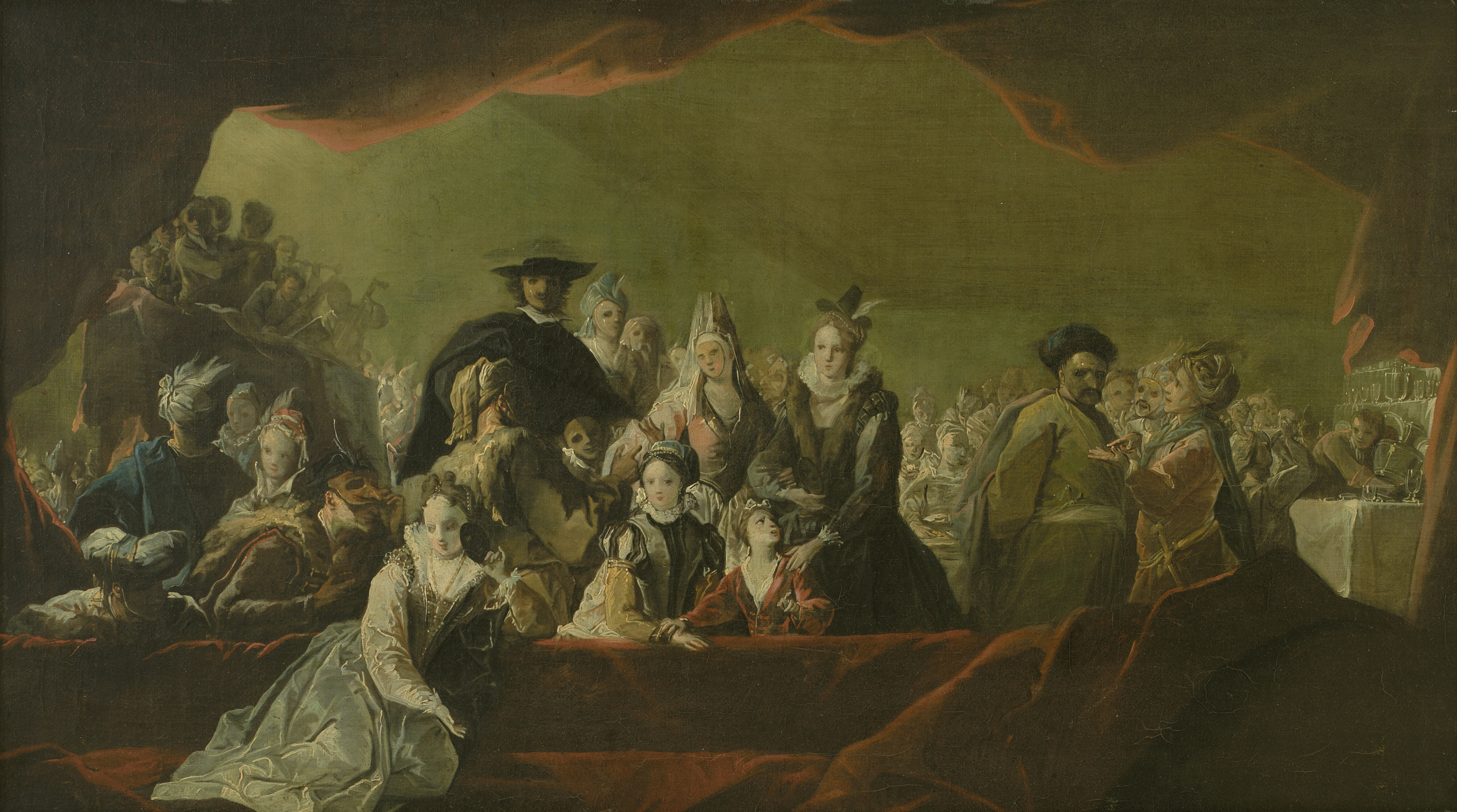
A Masked Ball

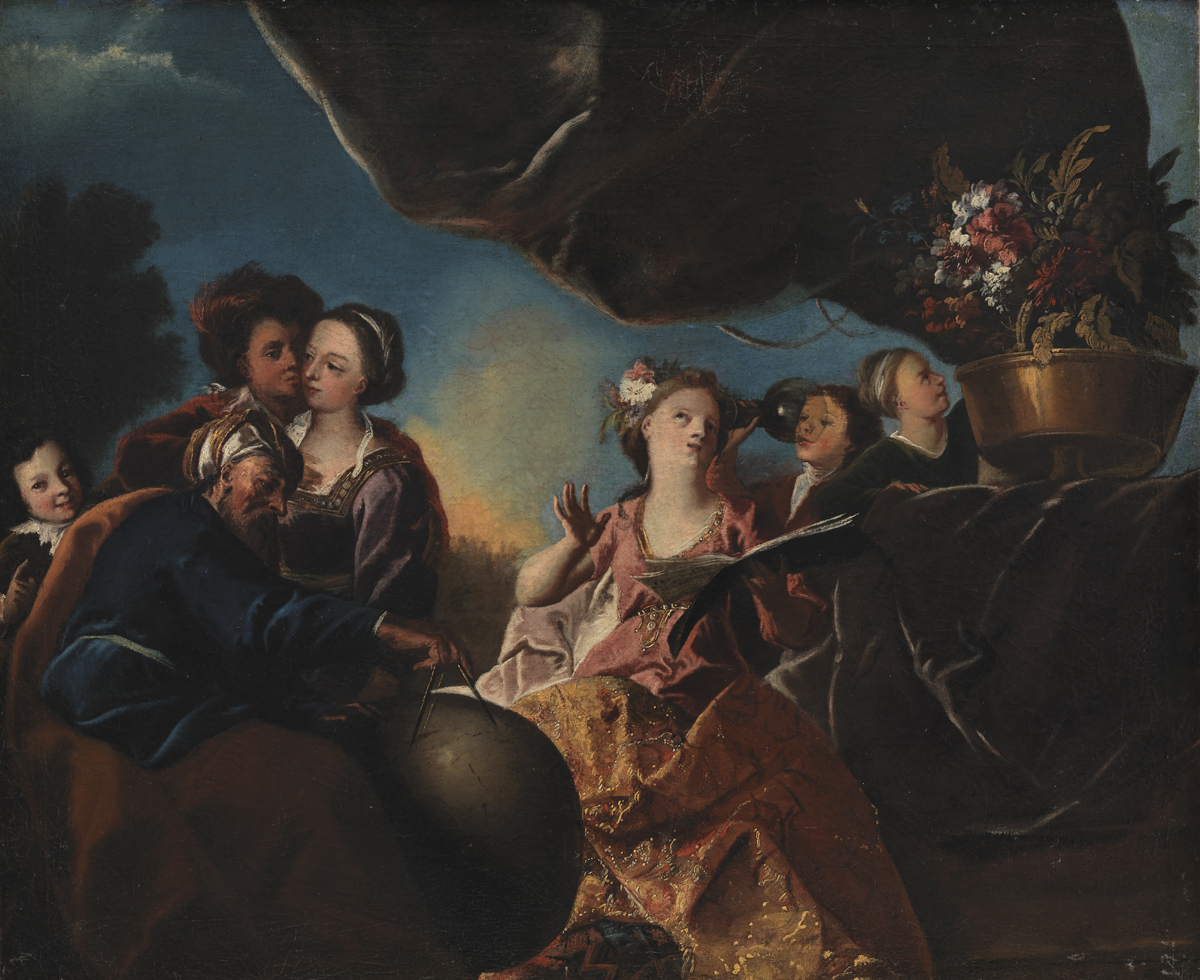
The Five Senses

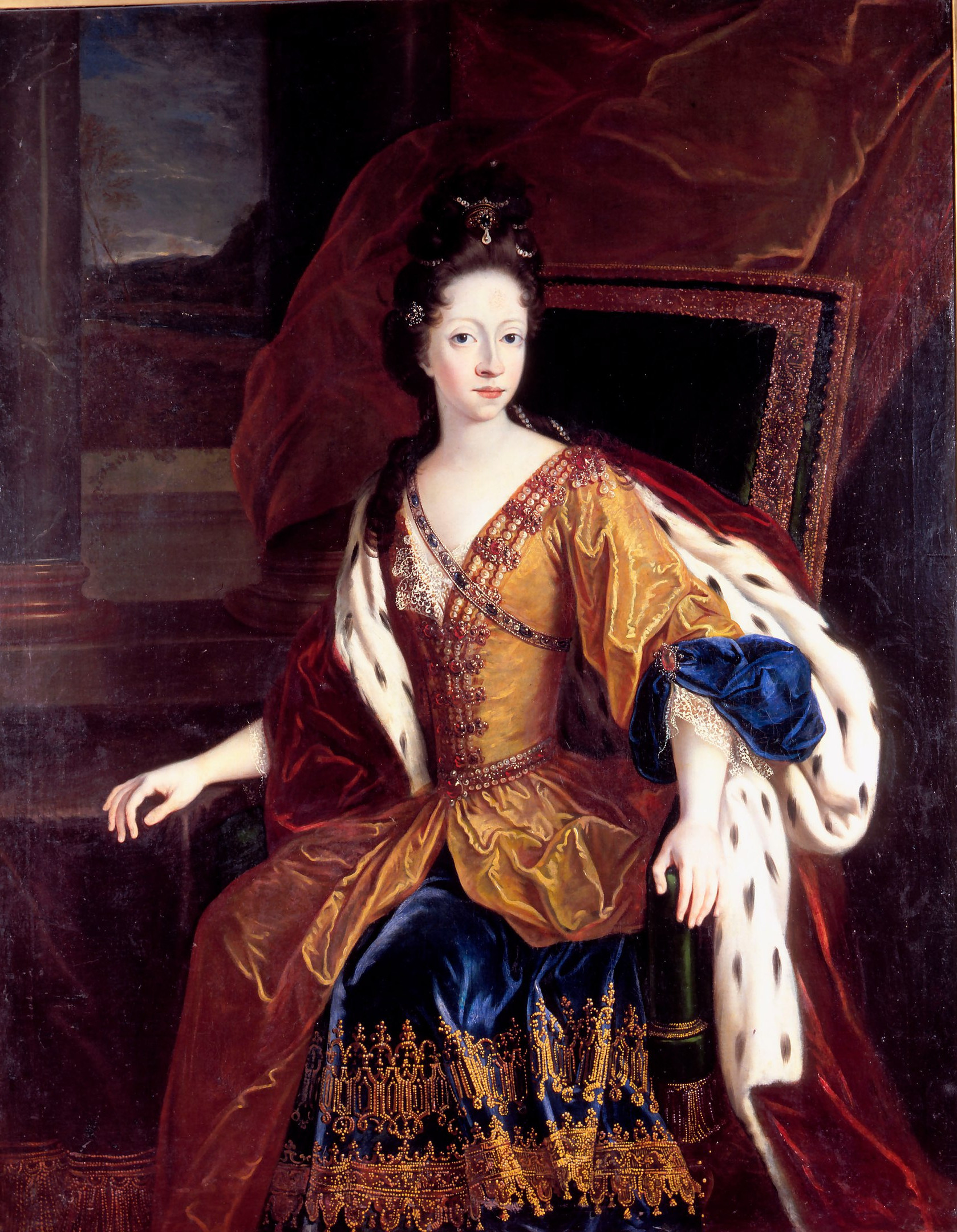
Princess Sophia Hedwig

== See also ==
- Art of Denmark
