= Jens Michelsen Beck =

Danish landowner and planter (1721–1791)

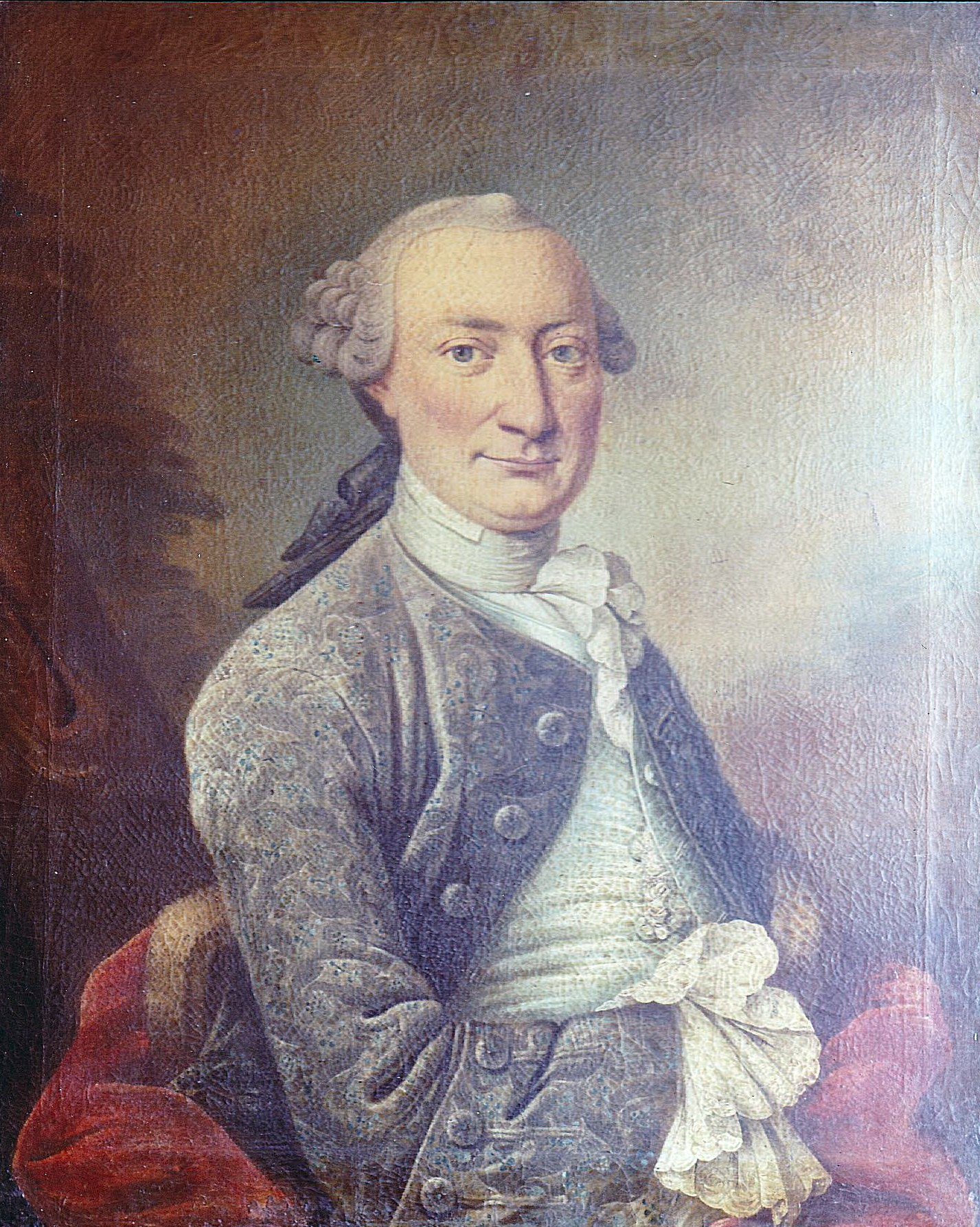
- Born: 1 January 1721; Nyborg, Denmark
- Died: 29 May 1791 (aged 70); Gentofte, Denmark
- Occupations: Cartographer and planter

Jens Michelsen Beck (1 January 1721 – 29 May 1791) was a Danish surveyor, cartographer, landowner and planter. On the island of Saint Croix in the Danish West Indies, he owned the Beck's Grove plantation. Beck later returned to Denmark, settling on Gentoftegård north of Copenhagen. His daughter Christiane was married to Ove Malling.

== Early life ==
Beck was born on 1 January 1721 in Nyborg on the island of Funen, the son of Michael Svendsen Beck and Anne Nielsdatter. His father was a shoemaker.

== Years on Saint Croix ==
As a young man Beck went to the Danish West Indies to work as a junior assistant for the Danish West India Company. He landed on Saint Thomas on 19 June 1742. In 1743, he transferred to Saint Croix. His salary was then 10 Danish rigsdaler per month. In 1745, he was promoted to senior assistant with a monthly salary of 14 Danish rigsdaler.

Beck created the first town plan for the city of Frederiksted as well as one of the most frequently reproduced historical maps of Saint Croix.

In 1750, Beck invested in plantation land on the western part of the island, establishing Beck's Grove. Two natural springs provided the estate with freshwater. In 1766, he held 86 slaves on the plantation.

== Return to Denmark ==
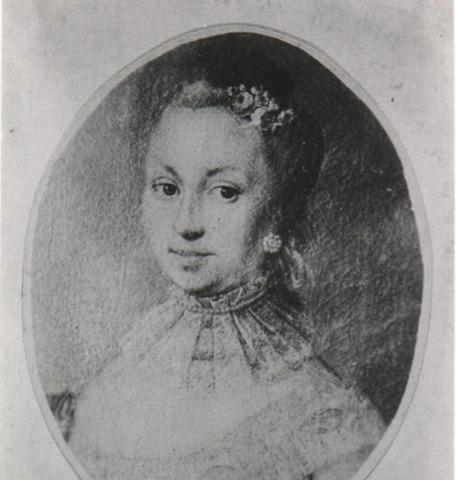
Louise Sofie Beck, née Hagen

In 1754, Beck returned to Denmark, leaving the management of Beck's Grove in the hands of an overseer, Adam Søbøtker.

He married on 17 September 1758 Louise Sophie Hagen, the daughter of the owner of Kong Salomons Apotek, Bernhard Hagen. The couple had eight children: Eleonora Sophia (1759-1826), Louise Henriette (1760-1831), Christiane (1761-1834), Frederica Amalia (1762-1762), Michael Bernhard (1764-<1777), Jens Julius (1767-1767), Carl Christian (1768-1818) and Frederik (1773-1832). The family lived at Gothersgade No. 215 from 1770 to 1882.

Beck's wife died in 1777. In 1779, he purchased Gentoftegård / Kløkers Gård( and settled there permanently with his six children.

Beck's son Michael returned to the island to take over the plantation but died shortly thereafter in a hurricane that destroyed many of the buildings, crops and forest. In 1782, Beck sold a piece of land in Frederikssted. In 1787, he also decided to sell the estate.

== Legacy ==
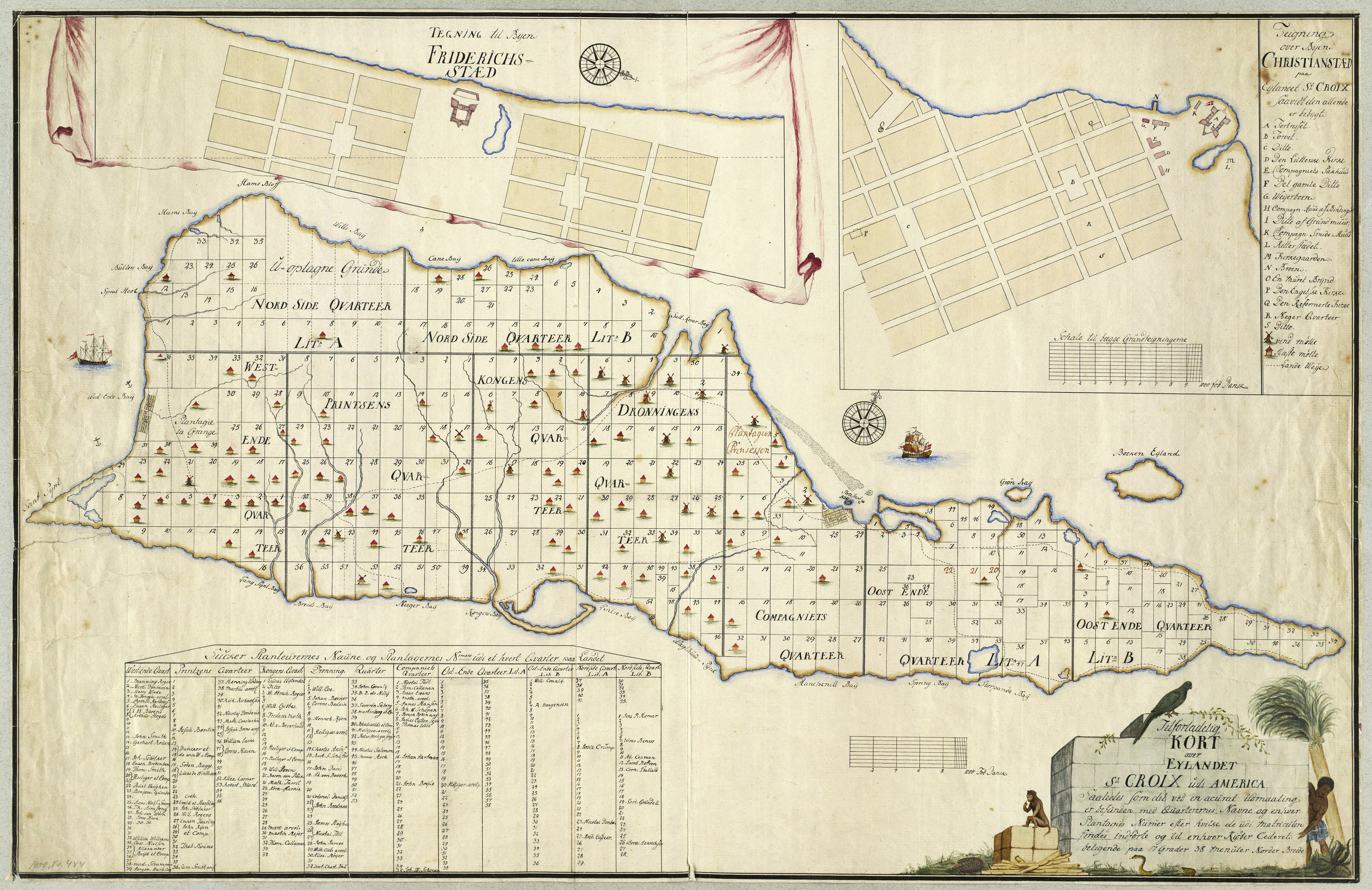
The Bernstorff Palace Gardens, Frederiksted

Beck's son, Carl Christian Beck (1767-1818), was a Lutheran minister. The eldest daughter Eleonora Sophie Beck (1759–1829) was married to the jurist Peder Hersleb Graah. The second oldest daughter Christiane Beck (1761-1834) was married to the historian and statesman Ove Malling . The third oldest daughter Louise Henriette (1760-1831) was married to the Supreme Court attorney Peter Herslef (1756-), the son of Hans Christopher Herslef.

After Beck's death, Gentoftegård was taken over by his son-in-law Ove Malling. He erected a stone with an inscription commemorating his father-in-law on the property. It is now located outside the building Salem and Kløckershave.
