= Margrethe Marie Thomasine Numsen =

Danish courtier

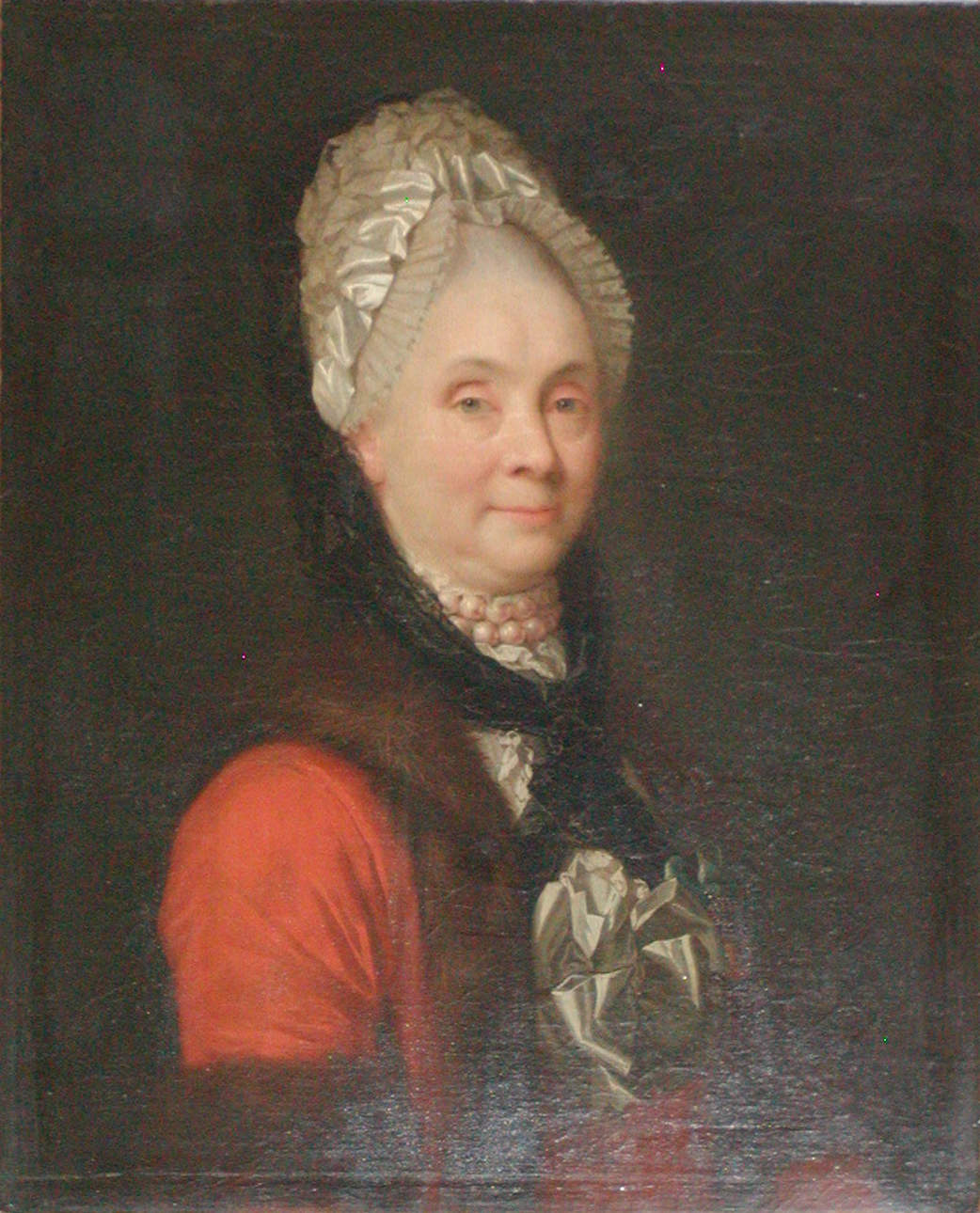
Margrethe Marie Thomasine Numsen

Margrethe Marie Thomasine Numsen (née Ingenhaef(f); 8 March 1705 - 8 October 1776), was a politically active Danish courtier.

She was the daughter of general major noble Johan Peter Ingenhaeff. She served as lady-in-waiting to queen Anne Sophie Reventlow prior to her marriage. In 1725, she married general noble Michael Numsen. She was given the Ordre de l'Union Parfaite 1753.

After the death of her spouse in 1757, she became a central figure in court life, attributed political influence and often criticized. In 1772, she was appointed the head of the court of the crown prince, the future Frederick VI of Denmark. The crown prince who reportedly liked her very much and called her Mutter.

She belonged to a party at court in opposition to J. H. E Bernstorff alongside Schimmelmann and Prince Charles of Hesse, and supported the candidate of Schack Rathlou as his replacement.

In 1773, several members of the royal court was ousted after the dismissal of Osten and Andreas Schumacher, who were accused of sympathy with the burghers, and in September, Numsen lost the favor of queen Juliana Maria of Brunswick-Wolfenbüttel after having planned a coup d'état to replace the regency of Juliana Maria composed by one headed by A. P. Bernstorff, Schack Rathlou, Schimmelmann, Prince Charles and Princess Louise, and was exiled from court with the maids-of-honour Råben and Krogh and number of lower officials - Numsen was, however, officially given an honorable discharge and a pension.
