= Søren Abildgaard =

Danish naturalist

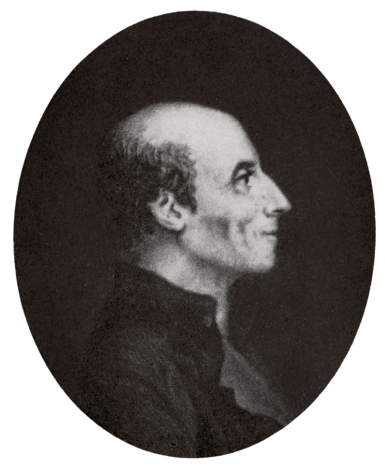
Søren Abildgaard

Søren Pedersen Abildgaard (18 February 1718 – 2 July 1791) was a Danish naturalist, writer and illustrator. He was born in Flekkefjord in Norway and died in Copenhagen in Denmark.

Abildgaard traveled throughout Denmark in order to create drawings of its tombstones, runes and other historic monuments. In 1753–54 he was an illustrator and painter on historian Jacob Langebek's tour to Sweden and the Baltic provinces. He is also remembered for his studies of topographical and geological conditions and phenomena.

From 1755 to 1778 he worked as a master draftsman at the Royal Gehejmearkivet in Copenhagen. His drawings are presently kept at the National Museum of Denmark and at the Frederiksborg Museum in Hillerød and are regarded as important sources for antiquarian research.

He was married to Anne Margrethe Bastholm, and had two sons, Nicolai Abraham Abildgaard (1744–1809) and Peter Christian Abildgaard (1740–1801).

== Published works ==
In 1759 he published the first geological account of the chert and fossil bearing chalk beds at Stevns Klint on the Danish island of Zealand, Beskrivelse over Stevens Klint og dens naturlige Mærkværdigheder. His other works include Physisk-mineralogisk Beskrivelse over Möens klint (Physical and mineralogical description of Møns Klint; 1781) and a treatise on peat, titled Afhandling om Tørv (1765).

== Literature ==
- Poul Grinder-Hansen, Søren Abildgaard (1718-1791) - Fortiden på tegnebrættet, Nationalmuseet, 2011. ISBN 978-87-7602-135-1.(in Danish).

== References and external links ==
- Most widely held works by Søren Abildgaard at WorldCat Identities
