= Nyhavn 11 =

Building in Copenhagen

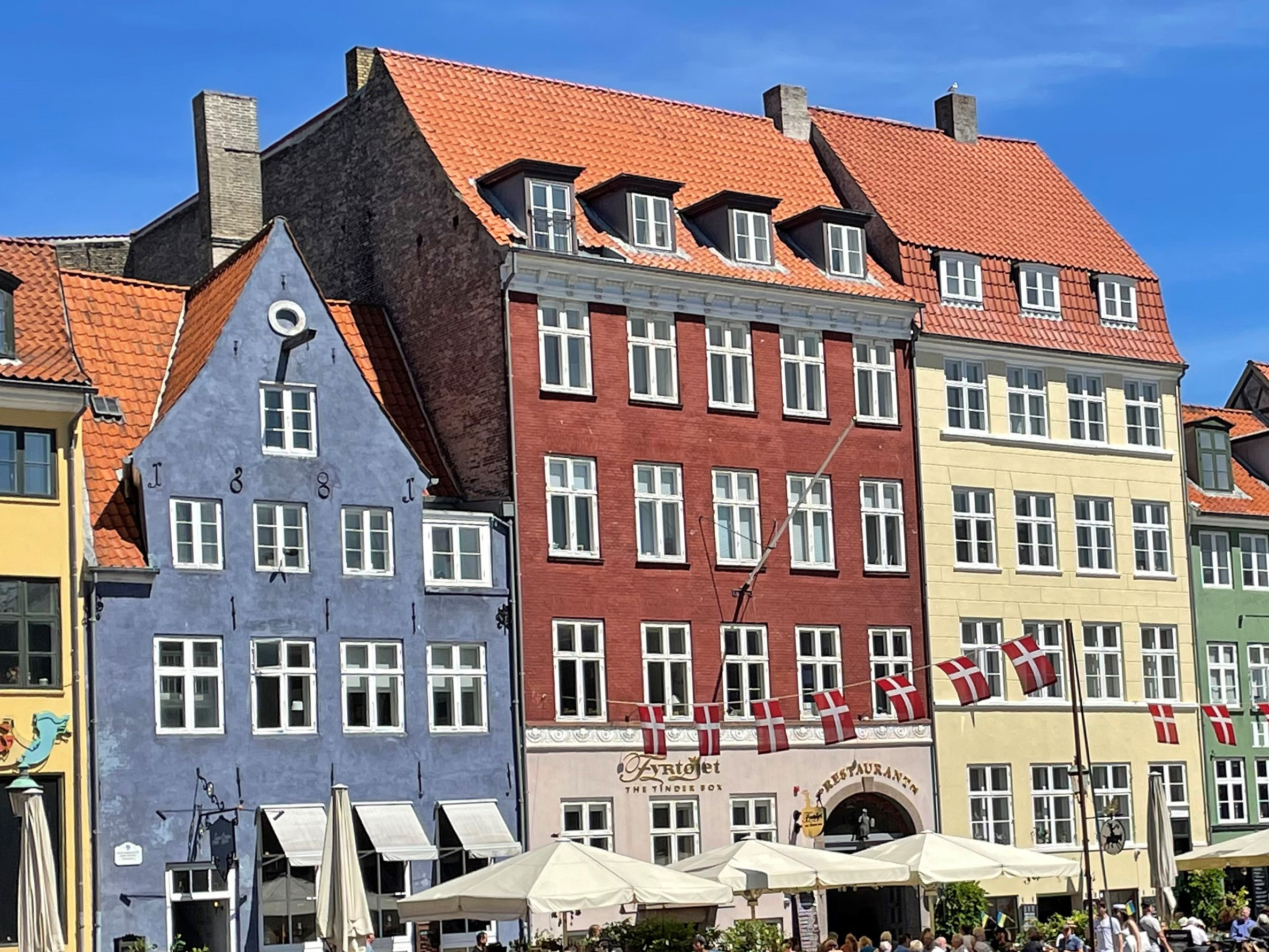
- Nyhavn 31 seen from the other side of the canal
- Interactive map of the Nyhavn 11 area

General information
- Location: Copenhagen, Denmark, Denmark
- Coordinates: 55°40′50.24″N 12°35′19.44″E
- Construction started: 1735
- Completed: 1736

Nyhavn 11 is an 18th-century property overlooking the Nyhavn canal in central Copenhagen, Denmark. Ludvig Ferdinand Rømer established a sugar refinery on the property in 1653 and it was later continued by changing owners until at least the 1860s. A small figure of a sugar-baker holding a sugar cone is still seen above the gate. The building was listed in the Danish registry of protected buildings and places in 1932. Notable former residents include the general trader Jacob Severin and actors Christen Niemann Rosenkilde, Julie Sødring and Poul Reumert. The lamp manufacturer Louis Poulsen was later based in the building from 1908 to 2006.

== History ==
=== Early history ===
The property was listed in Copenhagen's first cadastre from 1689 as No. 6 in St. Ann's East Quarter (Sankt Annæ Øster Kvarter). It was at that time owned by Pder Andersen Hegelund. A two-storey building was built on the site in about 1700.

=== Jacob Severin ===
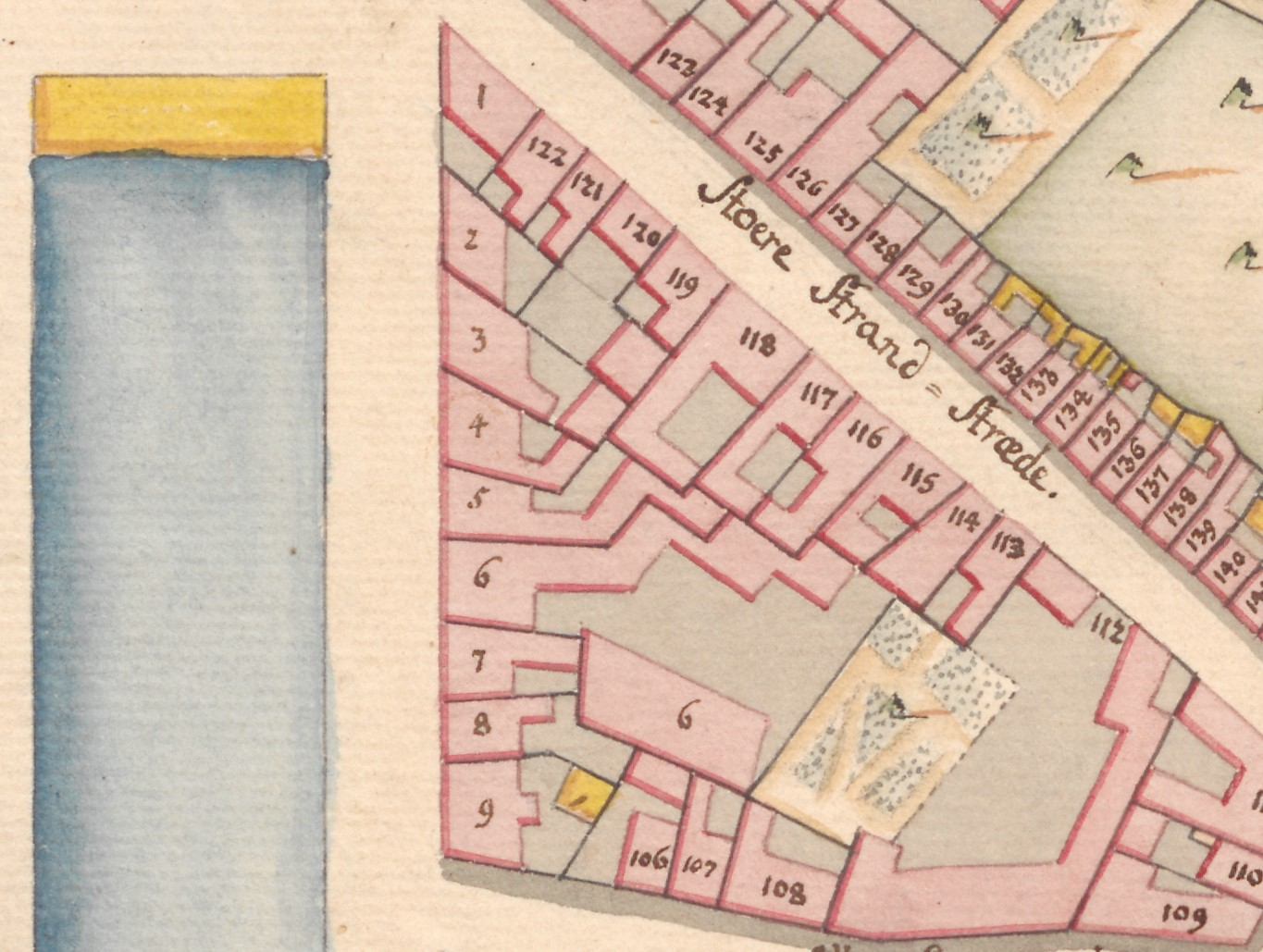
No. 6 seen in a detail from Christian Gedde's map of St. Ann's East Quarter, 1757

One of its first owners was Jacob Severin. He had married rich. After attending school to the age of 15, he married at age 22 a woman over forty years his senior, Maren Nielsdatter, the widow of the merchant Segud Langwagen. Using her capital, Severin took over her former husband's monopoly over the Icelandic trade with Denmark and built a thriving company specialized in Iceland, Finnmark and whaling off Spitzbergen. As a member of Copenhagen's 32 Men, he had the right to an audience before the king.

=== Ludvig Ferdinand Rømer ===
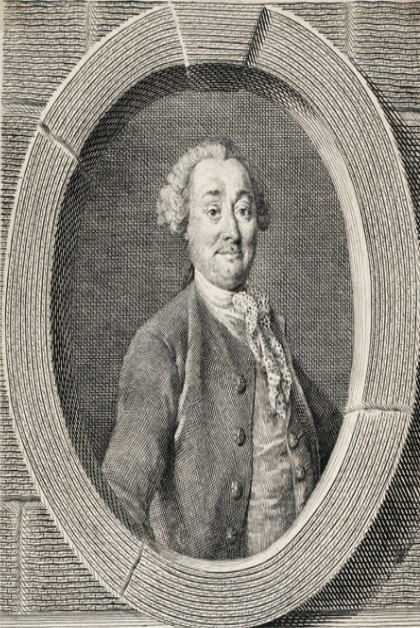
Ludvig Ferdinand Rømer

In 1754, Ludvig Ferdinand Römer established a sugar refinery in the building. He had been governor of the Danish Gold Coast. His wife was Anna Cathrine Widderkamp and the couple had 14 children.

The property and associated sugar refinery was upon Romer's death in 1776 passed to his son Friederich Christian Rømer (1755-1827). At the time of the 1787 census, Rømer resided in the building with his wife Christiana Dorothea, their five children (aged one to six) and the wife's sister Dorothea Maria Lorch. The household comprised a total of 28 people. The other members of the household were either working at Rømer's sugar refinery or servants.

At the time of the 1801 census, Rømer and his wife resided in the building with their two youngest children (aged 12 and 18), the 26-year-old theologian Leonhardt Callisen (who would later marry Rømer's daughter Dorothea Maria), the office clerk (fuldmægtig) Anthon Moxoll, a number of sugar refinery workers, a coachman, a servant, a caretaker, a maid and two female cooks (one of them responsible for catering to the employees).

The property was again listed as No. 6 in the new cadastre of 1806. It was at that time still owned by Frederik Christian Rømer. He had also acquired the adjacent building at No 5 (now Nyhavn 9).

=== Schmidt and Brandtm 1812–1826 ===
Rømer's sugar refinery ran into difficulties during the Napoleonic Wars. In 1812, it was sold by Rømer & Partners for 275,000 rigsdaler kurant to sugar manufacturer Siegfred Schmidt. 220,000 rigsdaler was a government loan. At the Danish state bankruptcy in 1813, this loan was converted to 44,000 rigsdaler silver. In 1822, when Schmidt was unable to fulfill his payments, he unsuccessfully tried to sell the property at three different auctions. He ended up having to sell it for 30,387 rigsdaler to the government.

In 1824, Joseph Owen unsuccessfully tried to buy or lease the sugar refinery. The Statsgjældsdirektionen rejected his offer since it found the security he was able to offer unsatisfactory.

In April 1825, Nyhavn 11 was sold for 18,000 rigsdaler (with just 2,000 rigsdaler paid up front) to sugar manufacturer Johan Brandt.

=== Donner and Wilder ===
In 1826, Brandt sold the property with a substantial profit to captain in the Royal Danish Navy Christian Hartvig Leonhard Donner (1780-1841) and merchant Hans Wilder. They continued the sugar refinery.

Donner's property was home to four households at the time of the 1834 census. Donner lived on the two lower floors with his wife Anna von Bülow and his 20-year-old niece Ida von Brockdorff. The sugar refinery was managed by sugar master Johann Adam Garven. He resided in the side wing with seven sugar refinery workers, a shopkeeper, two male servants and two maids.

=== Hendrik Pohlman Harboe ===
The property was shortly thereafter acquired by grocer (urtekræmmer) Hendrik Pohlman Harboe (1798–1873). In 1835–1836, he heightened the building with two extra floors.

Harboe's property was home to a total of 34 residents at the 1840 census. Harboe resided on the first floor with his wife Mariane Harboe, the wife's sister Nikoline Johansen, a male servant, a maid, sugar master Johan Thomsen and three more employees. Benedicte Ulfsparre Rothe, widow of Admiral Carl Adolph Rothe, resided on the second floor with four unmarried children (aged 17 to 29), a male servant and a maid. Regine Frederikke Nagel, widow of merchant (grosserer) Grosser Peter Nagel, resided on the third floor with her three youngest children (aged 11 to 18), a maid and two lodgers (a jurist and a first lieutenant). Erik Svitzer (1792–1866), a professor of medicine at the University of Copenhagen, resided on the ground floor with a housekeeper, a coachman, the coachman's six-year-old son, a lodger and a maid.

=== Diederik Wilhelm Dons ===
The property was home to 33 residents in six households in 1845. Diederik Wilhelm Dons, a merchant, resided in one of the apartments with his wife Julie Dons (née Stalberg) and one maid. H.C.Bondrop, a grocer (urtekræmmer) and lieutenant in the Civilian Infantry Corps, resided in another apartment with his wife Gitt Bondrop (née Haeseus), their 10-year-old son Niels Hermann Bondrop, an employee in Bondryp's grocery business, two male servants, two maids and a concierge. Peter Johan Petersen, another merchant, resided in a third apartment with his wife Louise Marie Petersen, their 18-year-old daughter Emilie Christine Marie Muus and one maid. The actor Christen Niemann Rosenkilde resided in a fourth apartment with his wife M. Rosenkilde, their four children (aged 21 to 29), two male servants, one maid and one lodger. Johan Thomsen, the sugar master from the 1840 census, was now residing in the side wing with his wife Lovise Thomsen (née Melny). Peter Jensen, a lamp polisher at the Royal Danish Theatre, resided in the building with his wife Ane Jensen (née Christiansen) and their three children (aged two to eight).

Christen Niemann Rosenkilde resided in the building from 1842 to 1849. One of his daughters, Julie, later known by her married name Julie Sødring, became one of the leading Danish actresses of her time. She had her debut at the Royal Danish Theatre in the play Den Sorte Dronning (The Black Queen) in 1843. Many artists frequented Rosenkilde's home, including the Swedish singer Jenny Lind and the Norwegian violinist Ole Bull. In 1839 Julie Rosenkilde was married to the engineer Christopher Sødring, owner of the mineral water company Sødring & Co. They took over her father's apartment in the building.

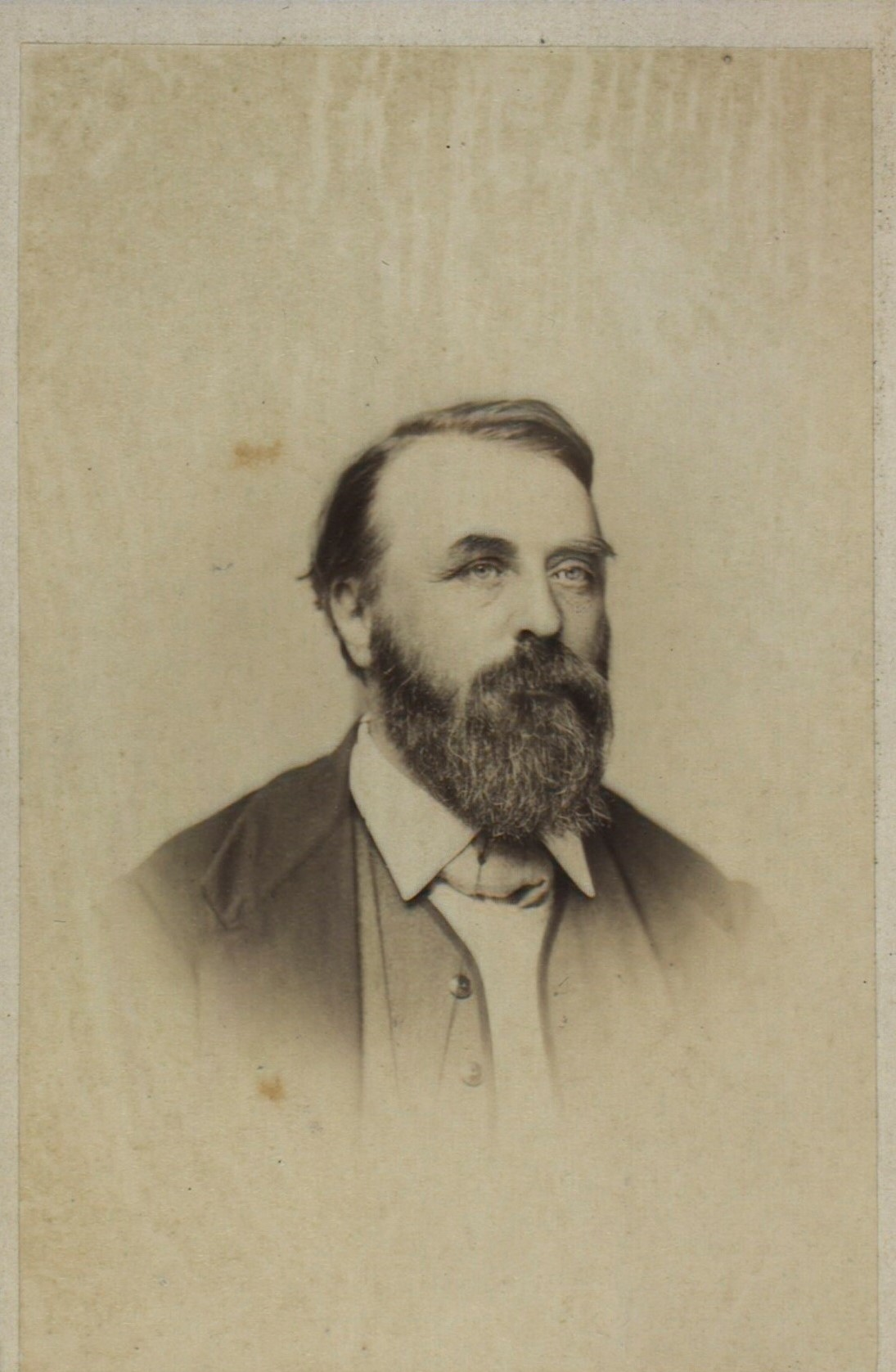
Christopher Hansen Sødring

Diederik Wilhelm Dons was still the owner of the property in 1850. He and his wife still resided in the ground-floor apartment with two maids. Hans Christian Bondrop still resided in the first-floor apartment with his wife, one son (aged 15) and six employees. Johan Frederik Carrøe (1817-1893), a businessman (grosserer), resided on the second floor with his wife Caroline Marie Thiesen (1820–1865) and one maid. Christopher and Julie Sødring resided in the other second floor apartment with the lodger Adolpph Strunk and one maid. Johan Frederik Carøe resided in another apartment with his wife, their two children (aged five and 10), the widow Vilhelmine Wissing, three male servants and two maids.

=== Carøe and Richter ===
The property was home to 43 residents in eight households at the 1860 census. Charlotte Betzy Ryge (née Anthon), widow of actor Johan Christian Rtge, resided in the building with her two daughters (aged 21 and 29) and two maids. Carl Ferdinand Dishicke, a businessman )grosserer), resided on the same floor with his wife Marie Dichicke, two male servants and one maid. Henrik Georg Worm, another businessman (grosserer), resided in another apartment with his wife Anthony Worm. Carl August Borgen (1815-1870), a sugar manufacturer and insurance agent, resided in the building with his wife Emilie August Borgen, their six children (aged two to 16) and two maids. Hermann David Lassen, a merchant, resided in the building with his apprentice Jacob Henrich Willenberg. Rasmus Peter Sommer, a 46-year-old man, resided in the building with his wife Ellen Margrethe Sommer and their two children (aged one and five). Christian Hansen, a 31-year-old man, resided in the building with his wife Marie Pedersen, their five-year-old daughter and his 66-year-old aunt Anne Olsen. Berthe Jensen (née Larsen), a widow cleaning lady, was the last resident of the building.

=== Carøe and Richter ===
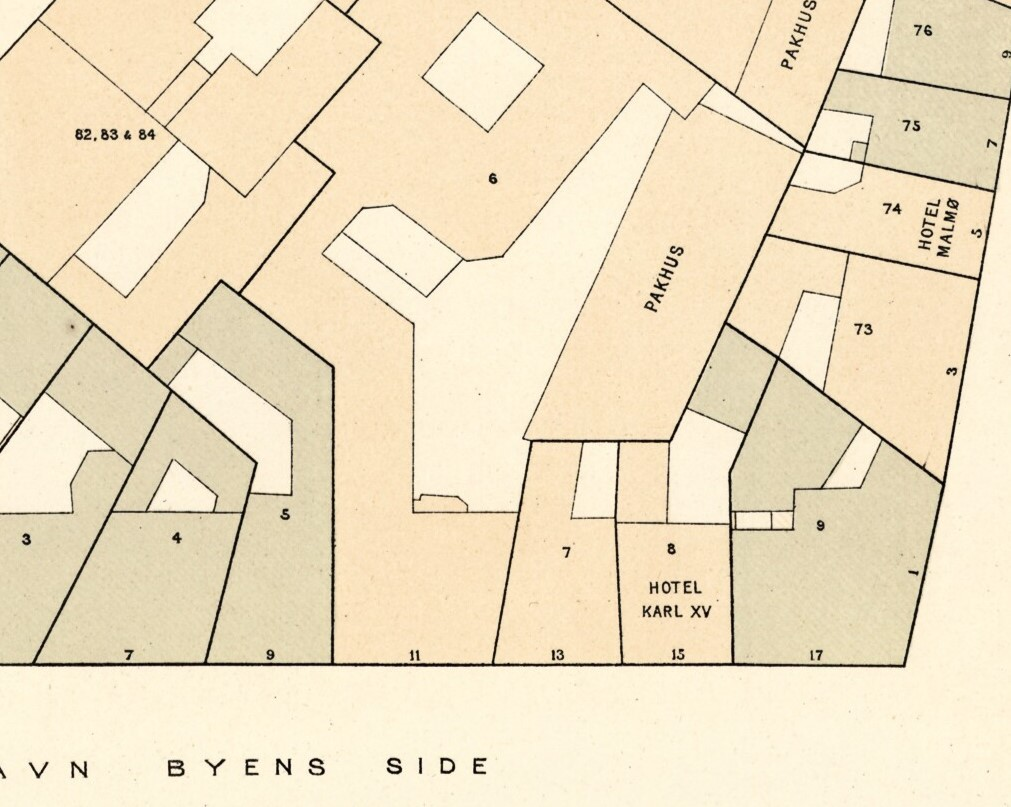
Nyhavn 11 seen on one of Berggreen's block plans of St. Ann's East Quarter, 1886-88

The building was home to 22 residents at the 1880 census. Eduard Julius Richter (1813-1892), a businessman, resided on the first floor with his wife Engelke (Angelique) Charlotte (née Krebs, 1811-1882) and two maids. Johan Frederic Carøe, another businessman (grosserer), resided on the second and part of the third floor with four of his children (aged 18 to 26), a housekeeper, a servant and three maids. Urikke Mathilde Nolleroth, a woman with means, resided on the rest of the third floor. Georgine Conradine, a laundry woman, resided in the garret. Peter Olsen, a workman, resided on the second floor of the side wing with his wife Maren Olsen and their five-year-old son. Peter Jørgensen, another workman, resided on the third floor of the side wing with his wife Stine Marie Jørgensen and their two-year-old daughter.

Eduard Julius Richter had established his own trading firm in 1952. His sons Carl Christian Richter (1847-1826) and Adam Christian Richter became partners in 1888. They continued the operations after the father's death. The company was later moved to Nyhavn 53.

=== 20th century ===
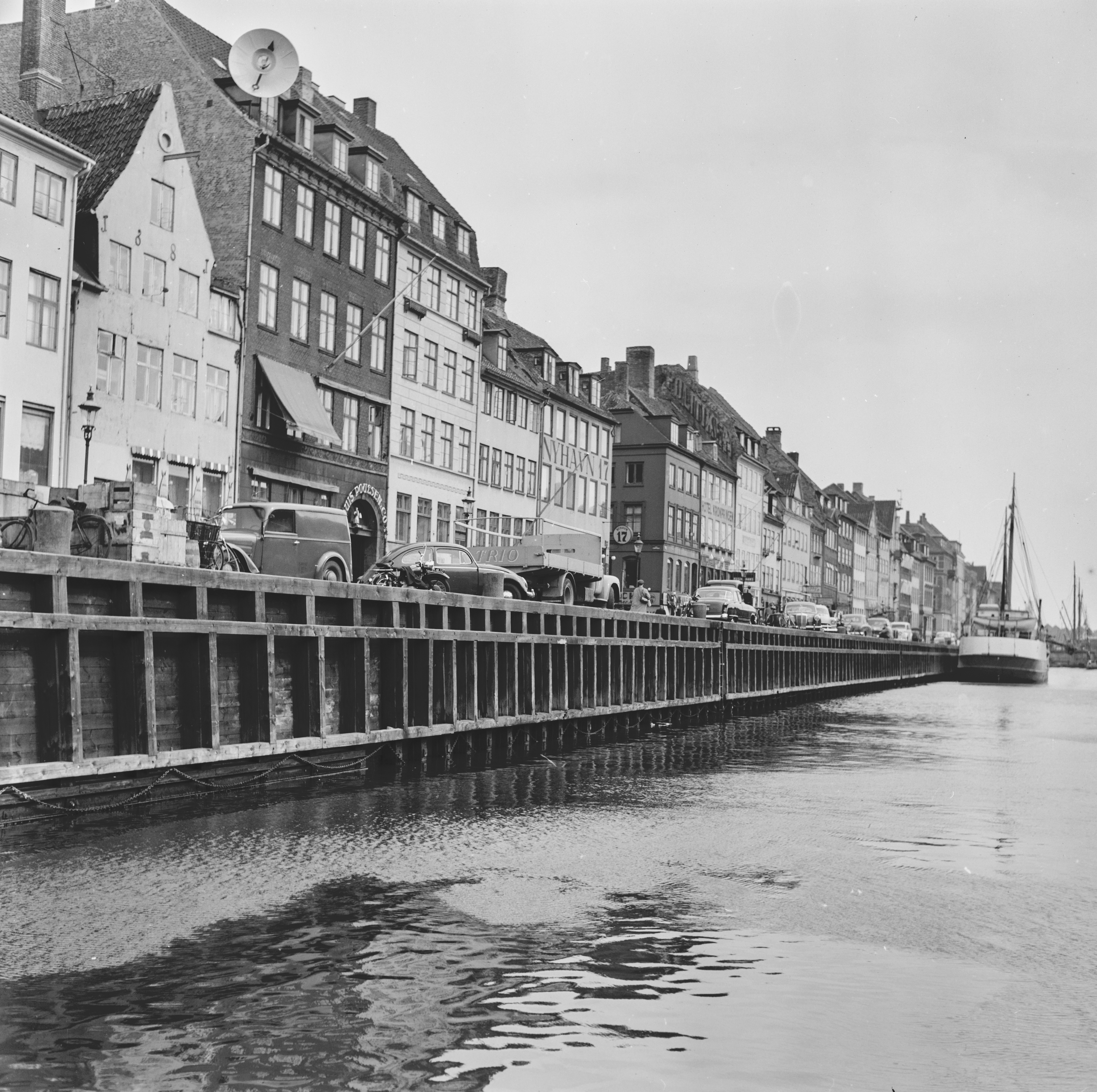
Nyhavn 11 in 1954

The lamp manufacturer Louis Poulsen was based in the building from 1908 to 2005. The building was listed by the Danish Heritage Agency in the Danish national registry of protected buildings in 1932.

The actor Poul Reumert, was for many years among the residents of the building. He grew up at Nyhavn 63.

== Building ==
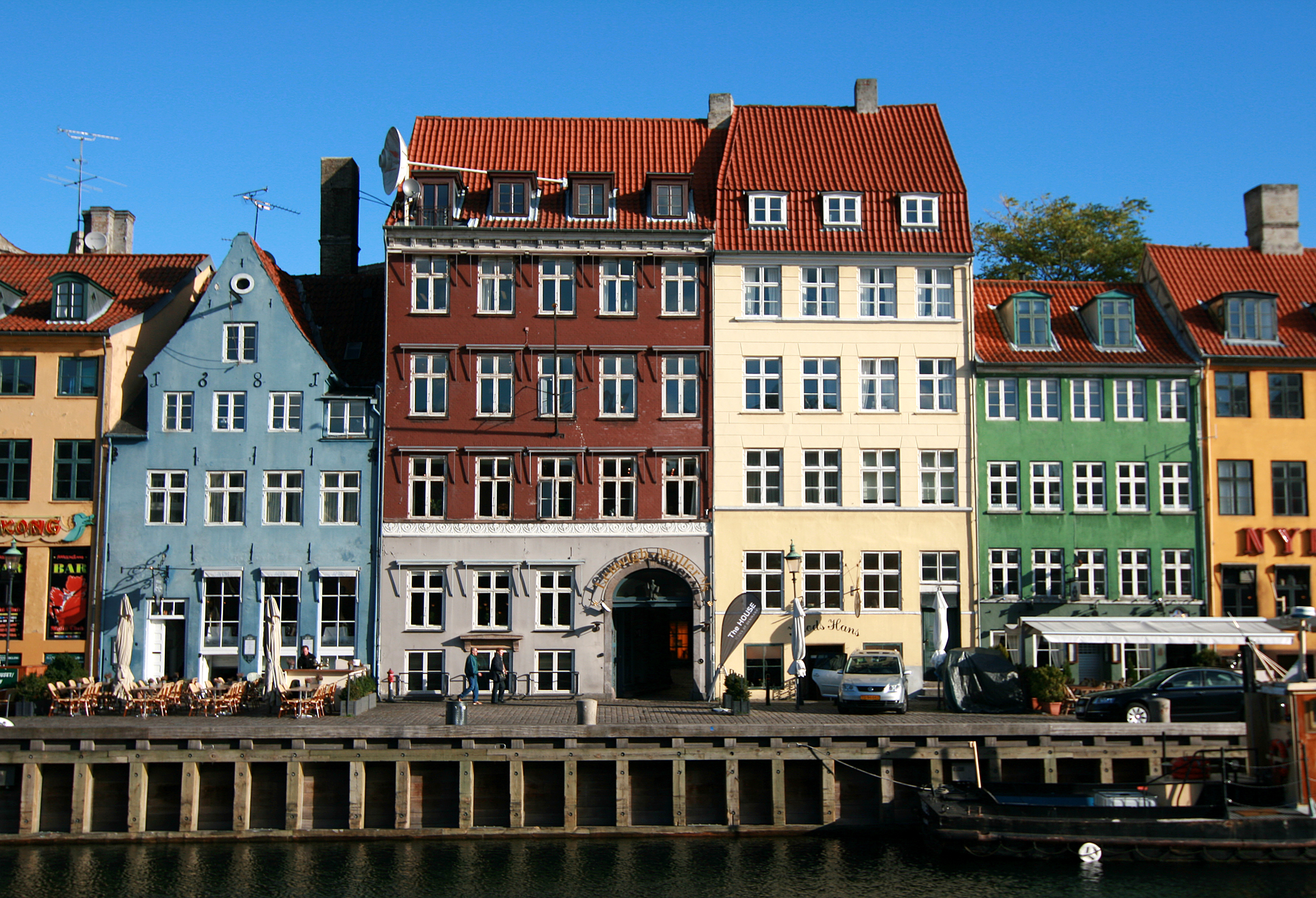
Nyhavn 11

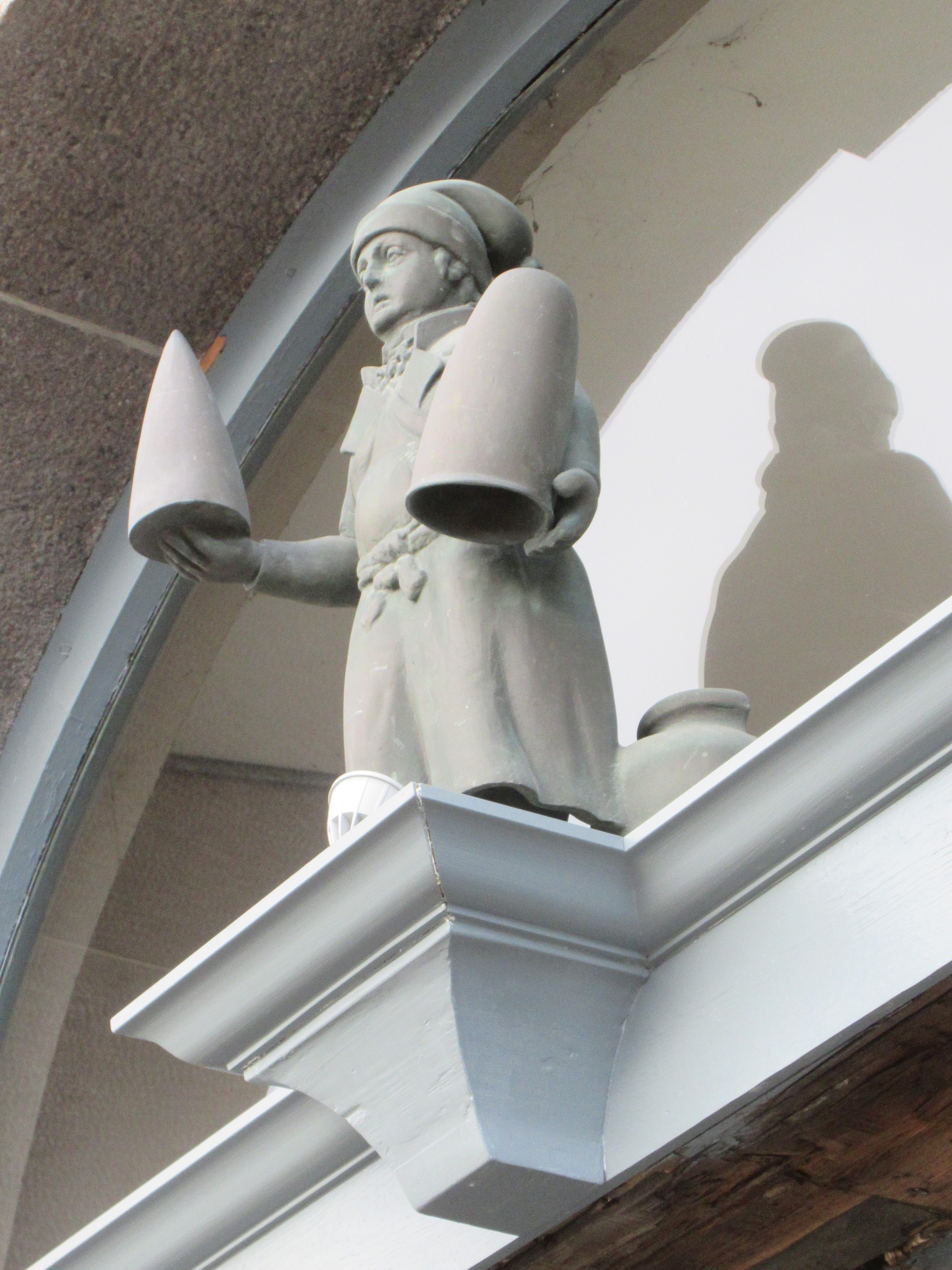
The figure above the gateway

The building is four storeys tall and five bays wide. It has a red tile roof with four dormers. Above the gate is a figure of a sugar-baker holding a sugarloaf in one hand and a sugar tin in the other. The figure dates from Römer's sugar refinery. It served as a means of identifications at a time when house numbers had not yet been introduced. Many other houses along the Nyhavn quay feature similar signs.

An appendix with staircase on the rear side of the building dates from 1875. The courtyard was refurbished in 1963 to a design by the landscape architect Knud Lund-Sørensen.

== Today ==
The leading Danish lamp manufacturer Louis Poulsen has been headquartered in the building since 1908.
