= Rosenkilde =

Rosenkilde is a Dutch surname. Notable people with the surname include:

- Christen Niemann Rosenkilde (1786–1861), Danish actor and writer
- Franciska Rosenkilde (born 1976), Danish geographer and politician
- Julie Sødring (born Julie Rosenkilde; 1823–1894), Danish actor and autobiographer
- Peder Valentin Rosenkilde (1772–1836), Norwegian merchant and politician
