= Ludvig Ferdinand Rømer =

Danish merchant and sugar-baker

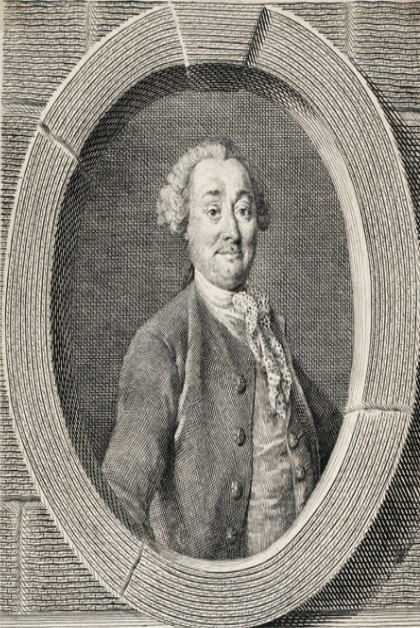
- Ludvig Ferdinand Rømer on an engraving by G. V. Baurenfeind from 1760
- Born: 9 January 1714; Elsfleth
- Died: 17 April 1776 (aged 62); Copenhagen, Denmark
- Occupations: Merchant and sugar manufacturer

Ludewig Ferdinand Rømer (9 January 1714 - 17 April 1776) was a Danish merchant and sugar-baker. He is mainly remembered for his two books on the Danish Gold Coast. A reliable account of the coast of Guinea was published in English in 2014. His home and sugar refinery was at Nyhavn 11 in Copenhagen.

== Career ==
Römer was born in Elsfleth in Lower Saxony. Nothing is known about his background. He came to the Danish Gold Coast in an early age where he was a senior assistant (overassistent) when seeking refuge at a British fortress in 1744 when governor Jørgen Billsen wanted to arrest him in connection with a controversy among members of the Danish colonial administration. He then returned to Denmark, where he wrote a number of complaints to the Danish West India Company. He was licensed as a merchant of the Danish Gold Coast and returned to Africa on board the ship Wilhelmine Galej in 1746. He was promoted to overkøbmand before returning to Denmark.

Back in Denmark he purchased a property at Nyhavn 11 in Copenhagen. In 1754, he was granted a license to open a sugar refinery at the site. He remained connected to the Danish colonies through his involvement with Det Københavnske Brødresocietet.

== Written works ==
Rømer is now mainly remembered for his books. In 1756, he published Tilforladelig Efterretning om Negotien paa Kysten Guinea (German translation in 1758). It was followed by Tilforladelig Efterretning om Kysten Guinea in 1760 /German translation in 1769). The latter contains a foreword by the theologian Erik Pontoppidan in which he claims that black slavery is not incompatible with Christian commandments. The Danish historian Georg Nørregård has characterized Rømer's books as "overwhelmingly unreliable". Römer did, however, have good local sources and the books contain valuable information about the history of the Asante (Ashanti) people and state. The historian Ivor Wilks has described his works as "one of the best sources of insight into the nature of coastal Ghanaian society in the eighteenth Century".

His book was published in English as A reliable account of the coast of Guinea in 2013.

== Personal life ==
On 2 June 1751, Rømer married Anna Cathrine Wedderkamp (c. 1732 - 5 March 1770) in St. Nicolas' Church in Copenhagen. The couple had 14 children. Rømer died on 17 April 1776. He is buried at Frederick's German Church.
