= Jonas Collin =

Danish civil servant

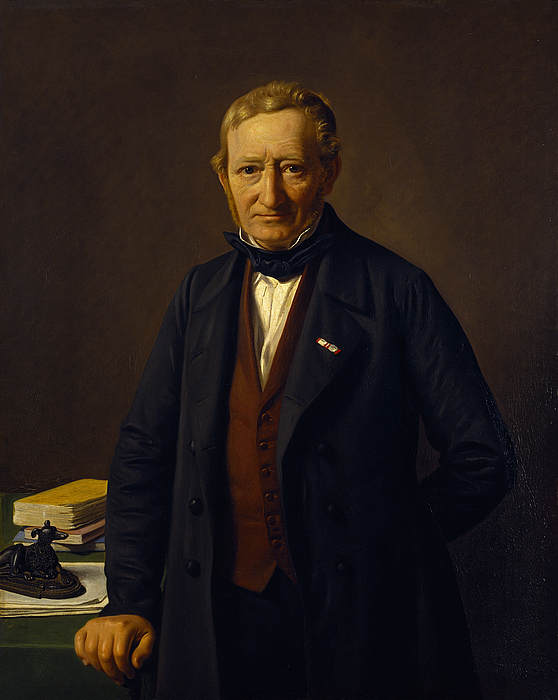
- Collin painted by Constantin Hansen, 1851
- Born: 6 January 1776; Copenhagen, Denmark
- Died: 28 August 1861 (aged 85); Copenhagen, Denmark
- Occupation: Civil servant
- Known for: Hans Christian Andersen associations
- Awards: Grand cross of the Dannebrog, 1840

Jonas Collin (6 January 1776 – 28 August 1861) was a Danish civil servant and patron of the arts. He took care of Hans Christian Andersen when the later writer first arrived in Copenhagen as a child and remained his loyal friend and supporter for the remainder of his life. He was also involved in the foundation of the Thorvaldsen Museum.

== Early life and education ==
Collin was born in Copenhagen, the son of director of the Royal Danish Class Lottery Niels Collin (1736–1797) and Ingeborg Bolten (1735–1817). He grew up in the Collin House in Bredgade. He was taught at home, first by his parents and then by private teachers, including Christopher Frimann Omsen and the priest Michael Gottlieb Birckner. He studied law at the University of Copenhagen, graduating in 1795.

== Career ==
Collin's first job was in his father's office. This left him with enough time to study foreign languages and follow lectures on philosophy, mathematics and physics at the university. In 1800, he passed the examination in surveying. He was a member of Drejer's Club where many of the leading writers of the time met and was himself a contributor to Knud Lyne Rahbek's Minerva and other journals. Collin left the Class Lottery when his father died. His contacts among high-ranking civil servants got him a position as a volunteer in the Treasury (Rentekammeret) where he mainly worked in the agriculture departments. In 1801, he was first appointed as copyist and then clerk. In 1807, he was appointed as bank commissioner and in 1812 as Assessor in Finanskollegiet and in 1816 as a finance deputy (deputeret for finanserne). He worked first under Ernst Schimmelmann and then Johan Sigismund von Møsting.

From early in his career, Collin had thoughts about a fundamental reorganization of the central administration. In 1815 he anonymously published as short article in Minerva in which he mocked the indolent and incompetent civil servants who only thought of their work as long as they were in their offices instead of "bringing it along wherever they go, going to bed with it at night and getting up with it in the morning". In the same articles, he proposed placing the responsibility for the government's spending and income in a single department. On several occasions, he in vain personally presented the same idea to Møsting. He was a member of the important finance commission which was established in 1836 under the leadership of Adam Wilhelm Moltke. He was a member of the Treasury from 1831 to 1840. Collin retired in December 1848.

Collin and H. Bech founded Sparekassen for Kjøbenhavn og Omegn in 1820. He worked for the establishment of a public bathing facility at Rysensteen Bastion and the Rosenborg Brøndanstalt day spa and mineral water factory in Rosenborg Castle Garden.

Collin was a member of Landhusholdningsselskabet from 1805 and served as president of the association from 1809 to 1855.

== Culture ==
Collin was secretary for the Foundation ad usus publicos from 1803 to 1833. This brought him in contact with most of the leading cultural figures of the time.

In 1821, in response to the so-called Mythological Dispute, he fostered the idea of a competition for artwork inspired by Norse mythology. He was a co-founder of Athenæum and Selskabet til naturlærens udbredelse. In 1841, he became an honorary member of the Academy of Fine Arts.

== Personal life ==
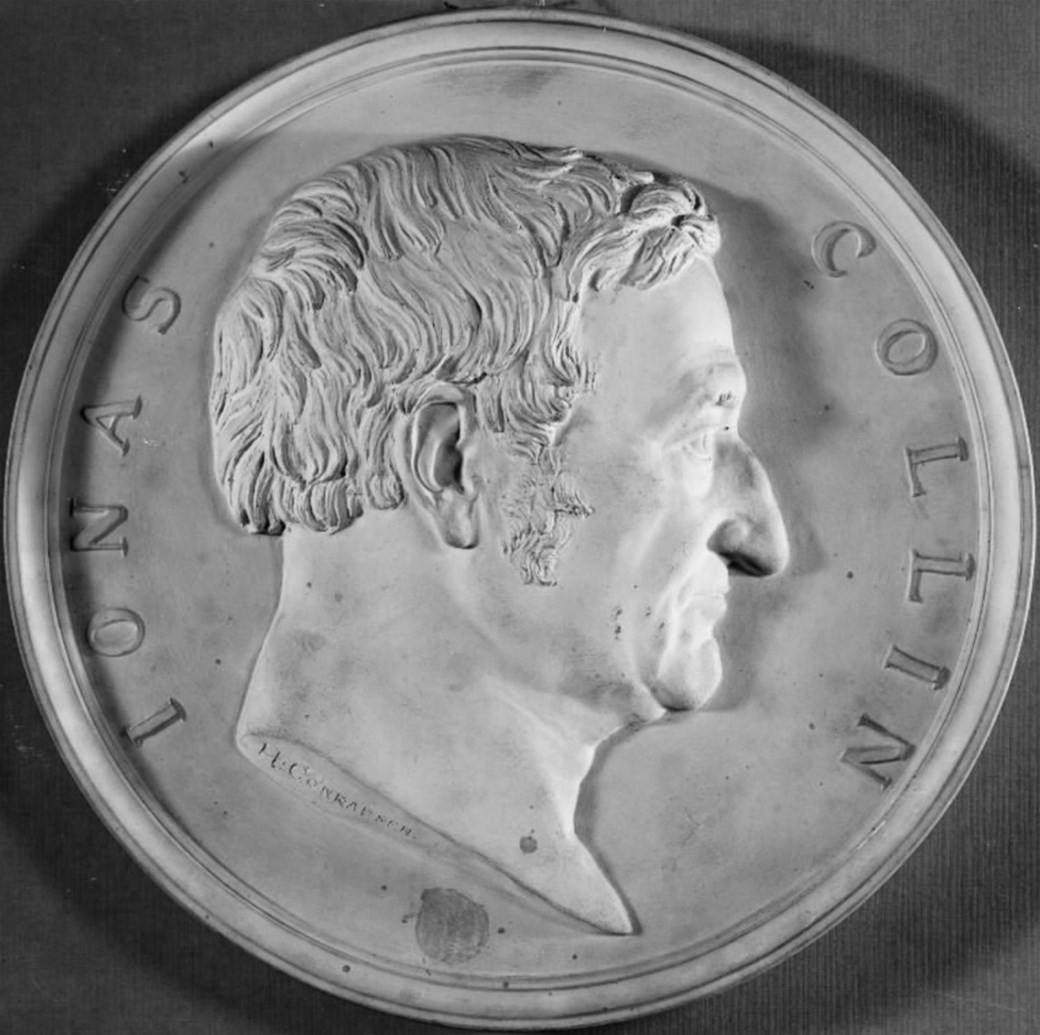
Portrait relief by Harald Conradsen from 1950.

Collin married Henriette Christine Birckner, née Hornemann, (c. 26 November 1772 – 21 May 1845) on 13 November 1803 in Ledøje Church. She had previously been married to Michael Gottlieb Birckner, Collin's former teacher. They had daughters Louise Collin (married Lind) and Ingeborg Collin (married Drewsen) and sons Edvard Collin, Gottlieb Collin and Theodor Collin.

He died on 28 August 1861 and is buried in Frederiksberg Old Cemetery.

== Awards ==
Collin became a Knight in the Order of the Dannebrog in 1813, received the Cross of Honour in 1826, became a Commander in the Order of the Dannebrog in 1836 and received the Grand Cross in 1849.

== Cultural references ==
Jonas Collin (Lars Brygmann) is depicted in the 2005 DR television series Unge Andersen. The couple had five children.

== Written works ==
Collin published For Historie og Statistik især Fædrelandet in 1822–1825.
