= Ole Bang =

Danish medical doctor

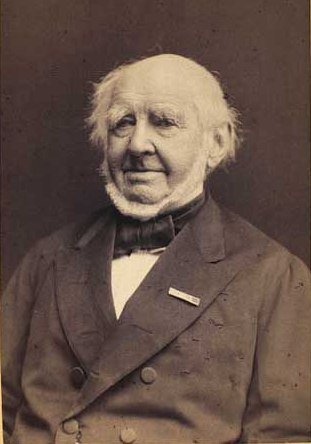
Ole Bang

Ole Bang (27 July 1788 – 12 October 1877) was a Danish medical doctor and professor at the University of Copenhagen. He was a co-founder of Rosenborg Brøndanstalt. He was the paternal grandfather of author Herman Bang.

== Early life and education ==
Bang was born in Copenhagen. He was the son of professor Frederik Ludvig Bang and Lovise Hansen. He attended the Schouboeske Institute and earned his Candidate of Medicine degree from the University of Copenhagen in 1808.

== Career ==
Bang served as district physician in Copenhagen from 1809 to 1818. In 1819, he became a member of Sundhedskollegiet (the Danish Health Authority) and an extraordinary professor at the university. In 1820, he became an ordinary professor. He served as rector of the university twice, first in 1824–1825 and again in 1839–1840. On 1 September 1925, he succeeded Johan Daniel Herholdt as chief physician at Frederiksberg Hospital.

He was involved in the establishment of Rosenborg Brøndanstalt in 1834 as well as in Klampenborg Kurbade-Anstalt.

== Personal life ==
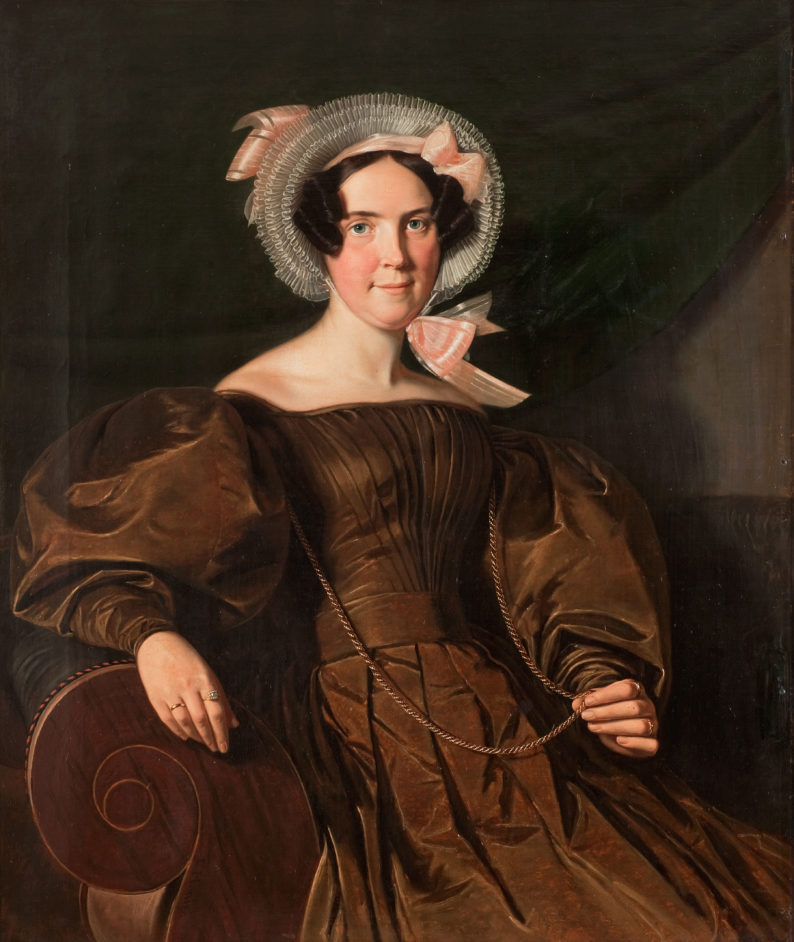
David Monies: Sophie Marie Bang, née Dahlerup.

On 4 December 1813 in Copenhagen, Bang married Henriette Louise Aamodt (1789–1818), daughter of hairdresser Ole Aamodt and Christine Lund. On 19 June 1826 in Frederikborg Palace Chapel, he later married Sophie Marie Dahlerup (14 April 1801 – 1878), daughter of later road manager (vejfiskal), hospital administrator and postmaster in Hillerød Hans Dahlerup (1758–1838) and Vilhelmine Marie Birch (1776–1850).

He was the paternal grandfather of author Herman Bang. The grandson—whose parents died in 1871 and 1875—lived with him for a few years as a young student. Herman Bang's first publication was a collection of his grandfather's poems and he later also described his uncle in the navel øøDet grå hus.

Bang died on 12 October 1877. He is buried at Assistens Cemetery.

== Awards ==
Bang was appointed as Etatsråd in 1836, Konferensråd in 1848 and Gehejmekonferensråd in 1874. He was created a Knight in the Order of the Dannebrog in 1829 and promoted to Knight Commander in 1842. He was awarded the Cross of Honour in 1749 and received the Grand Cross in 1864.

Academic offices
Preceded by Matthias Hastrup Bornemann	Rector of University of Copenhagen; 1824–1825	Succeeded by Hans Christian Ørsted
Preceded by Johannes Ephraim Larsen	Rector of University of Copenhagen; 1839–1840	Succeeded by Hans Christian Ørsted
