= Sødring & Co. =

Danish manufacturer

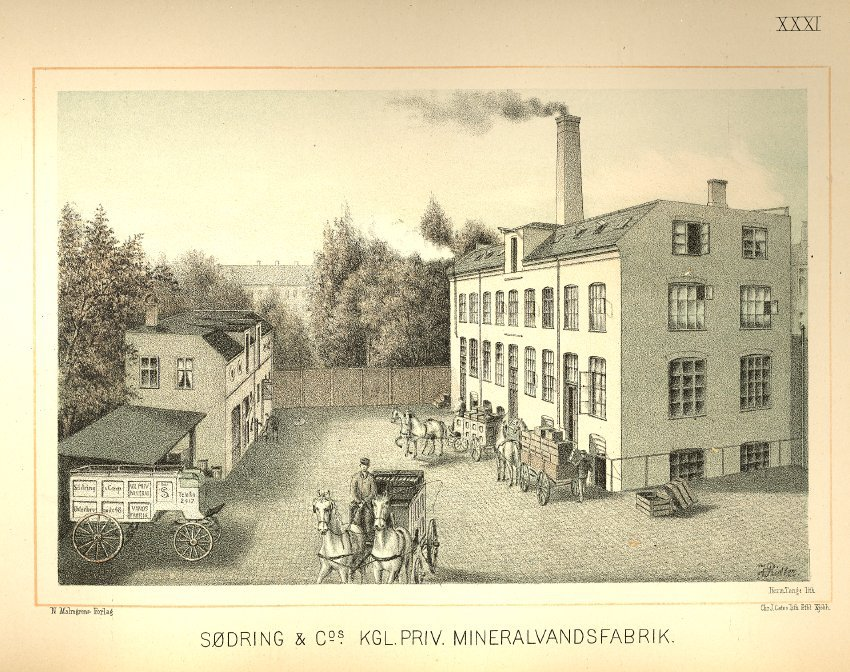
Sødring & Co.'s factory on Østerbrogade in Copenhagen, c. 1888

Sødring & Co. was a Danish manufacturer of artificial mineral water and soft drinks based in Copenhagen, Denmark. The company was initially based in Rabeshave in Christianshavn, then at Kompagnistræde 20 from 1860 and finally at Østerbrogade 48 (now No. 70) in Østerbro from 1886. A branch in Aalborg was established in 1870 and from 1926 continued as an independent company under the name Sødring & Co.'sEftf.. The remainder of the company was in 1929 acquired by Rosenborg Brøndanstalt.

== History ==
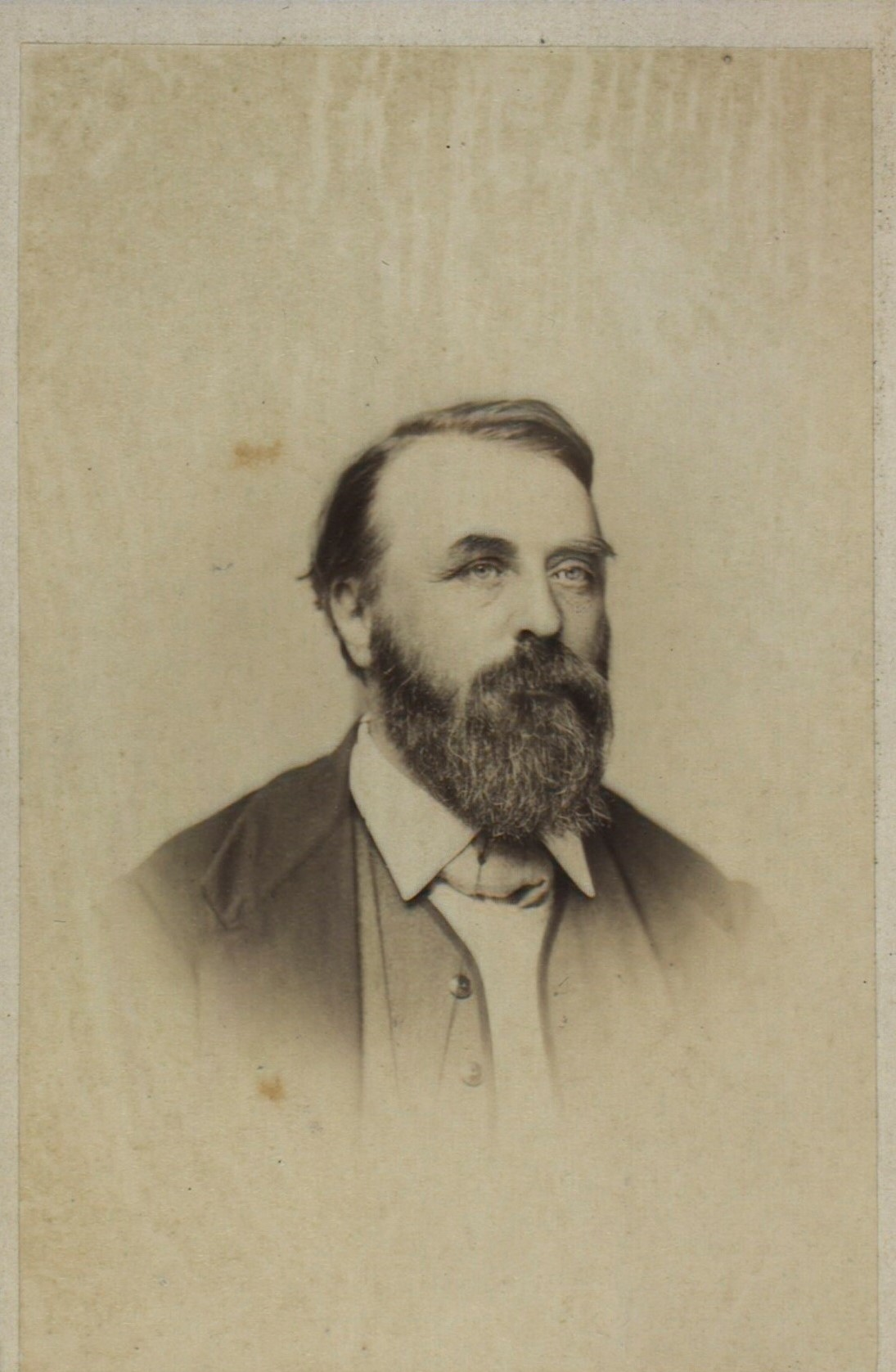
Christopher Hansen Sødring

Christopher Hansen Sødring (1822–1881), a cousin of the painter Frederik Hansen Sødring, graduated in Applied Sciences from the College of Advanced Technology in 1847. He then worked first as an assistant for professor Johan Georg Forchhammer and then from 1849 as an assistant at Rosenborg Brøndanstalt. He was the same year married to the actress Julie Sødring.

On 19 November 1855. Sødring went into a partnership with Frederik Marchus, Count Knuth til Knuthenborg aimed at establishing and operating a mineral water factory in Copenhagen. Knut contributed with the needed premises in Rabeshave in Christianshavn as well as up to 6,000 Danish rigsdaler in funding for the necessary materials and installationswhile Sødring according to their contract would be responsible for the daily operations of the enterprise.

The mineral water factory opened at Rabeshave the following year. The factory and the production methods had been approved by Sundhedskollegiet prior to its opening. It produced artificial mineral water with alleged medicinal properties based on extracts from natural springs.

Sødring was from 1860 the sole owner of the company. In October 1860, Sødring & Co. relocated to new premises at Kompagnistræde 20 and steam power was at the same time introduced in the operations. A second factory was opened in Aalborg in 1870.

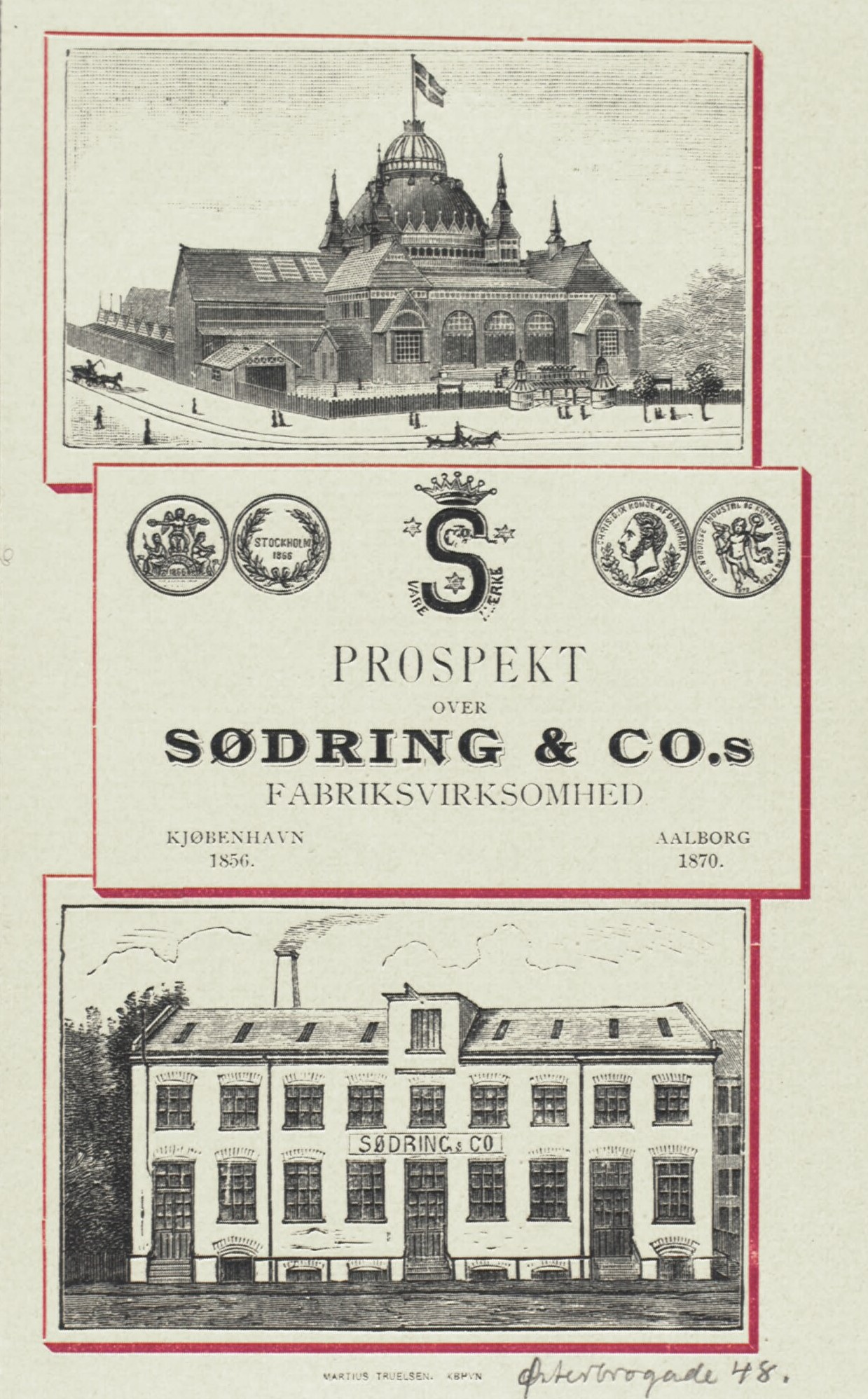
View of Sødring & Co.'s factory on Østerbrogade

Sødring's son Christian Sødring joined the company in 1872 and became its sole owner following his father's death in 1881. He constructed a new factory at Østerbrogade 47 in 1885–86.

The Aalborg factory was on 1 January 1926 sold to Arnold Sørensen (born 18 July 1879) and continued by him under the name Sødring & Co's Edtf. (S'dring & Co.'s Successor). In 1929, Sødring & Co.'s remaining activities in Copenhagen were acquired by Rosenborg Brøndanstalt. The activities of the two companies were the same year moved to a new factory at Bispevej 25in Bispebjerg. The company was in 1950 headed by Svend Sørensen. Board members were professor Carl Faurholt, director L. Tholstrup and lawyer J. C. Bang.

== Products ==
Brands and products owned by Sødring & Co. included:

- ABC Sports Selters
- Ananas Squash
- Basta - Sofus Raaen
- Citronvand
- Grape-Tonic
- Gul Valencia
- Hindbær Lomonade
- Jule-Citronvand
- Jule Hindbær Lomonade
- Messina Appelsin Squash
- Pompus
- Vitallo
- Ægte Lemon Squash
