= Rosenborg Brøndanstalt =

Danish mineral spa and water factory

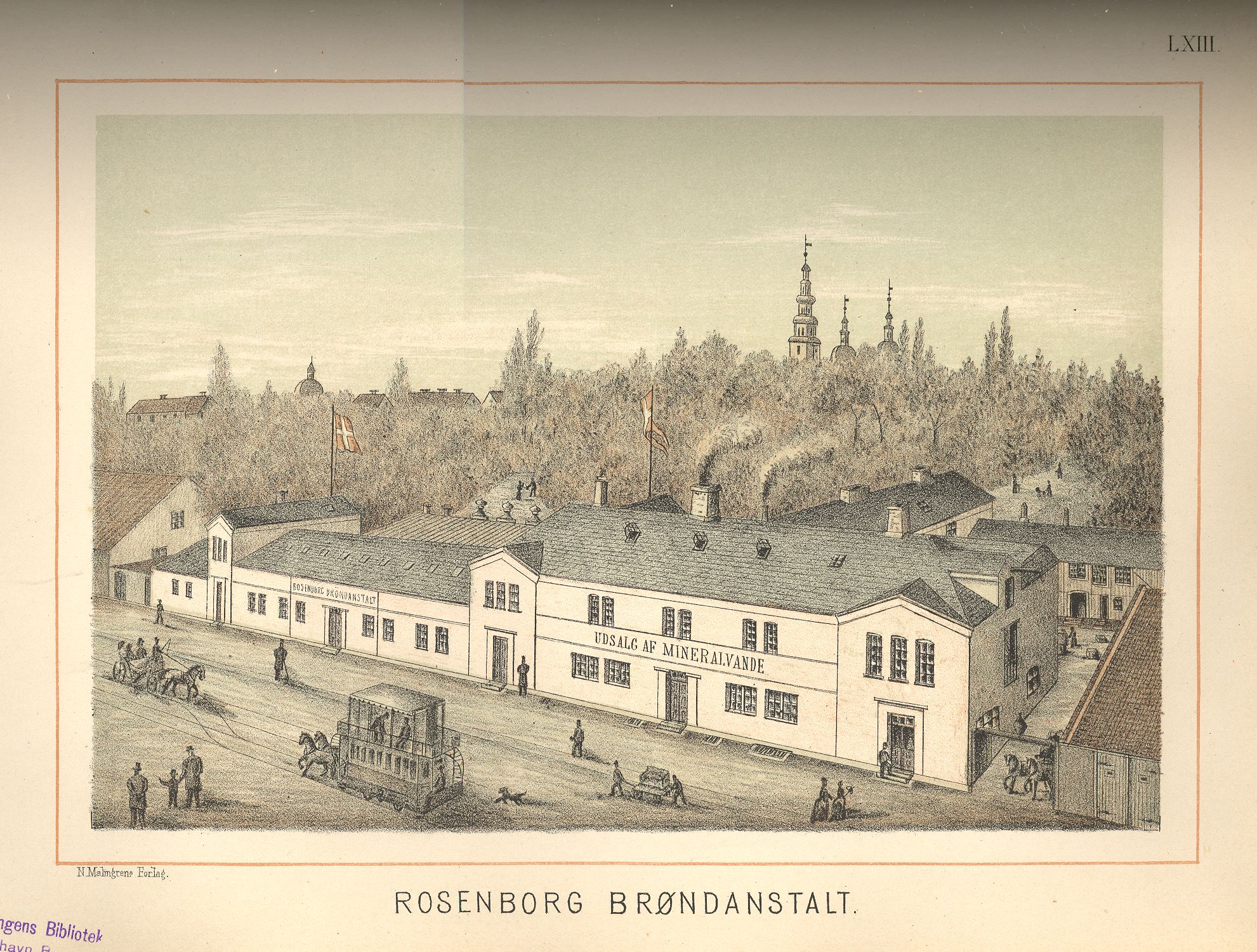
Rosenborg Brøndanstalt in circa 1888

Rosenborg Brøndanstalt was a mineral spa and mineral water factory located in Gothersgade in Copenhagen, Denmark. Rosenborg Brøndanstalt was founded on 23 March 1831 at the initiative of Jonas Collin, medical doctor Ole Bang, and Johan Georg Forchhammer to provide the citizens of Copenhagen with an alternative to visiting spas abroad. First Frederik VI and later Christian VIII contributed to the project by donating a strip of Rosenborg Castle Gardens along Gothersgade. The buildings were built to a design by royal building inspector Jørgen Hansen Koch in 1833.

== History ==
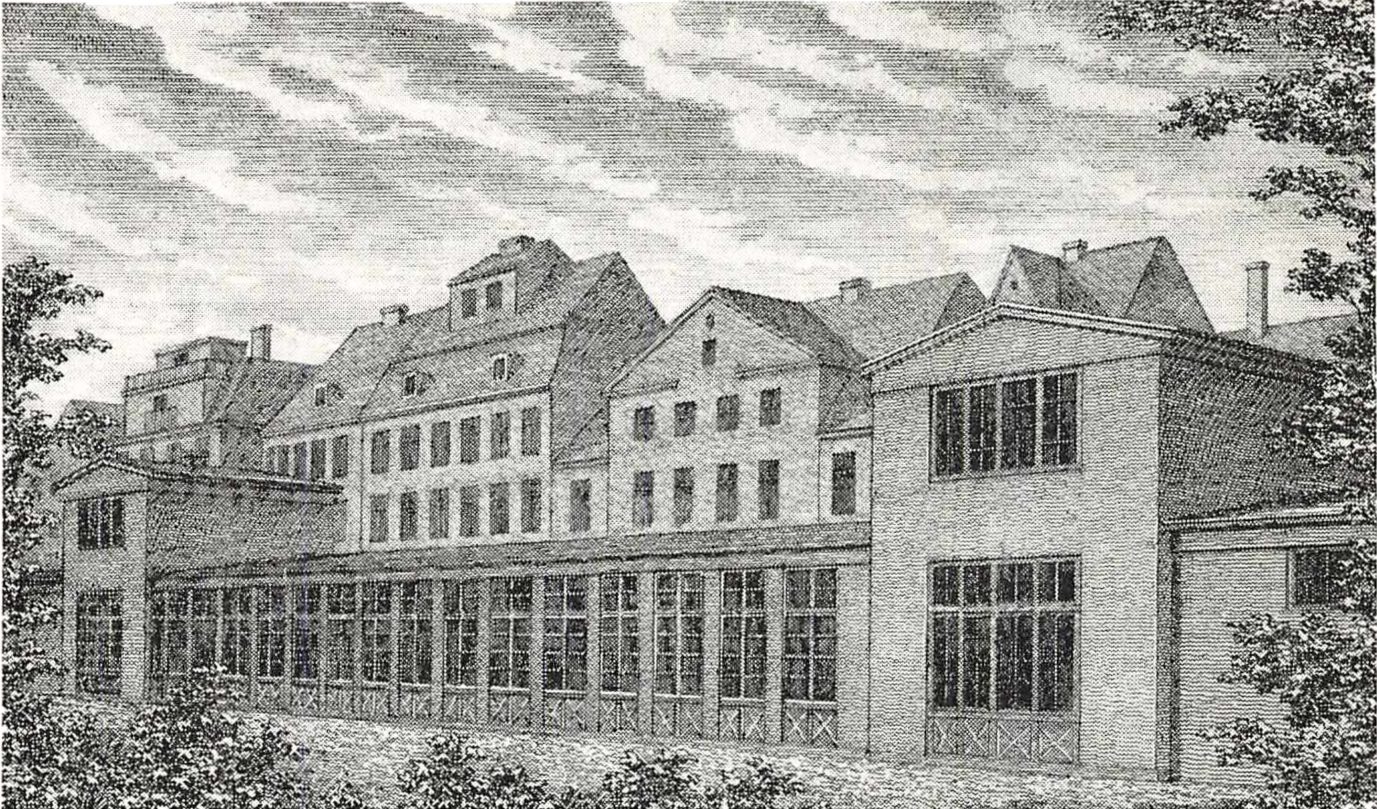
Tosenborg Brøndanstalt viewed from the garden, 1833.

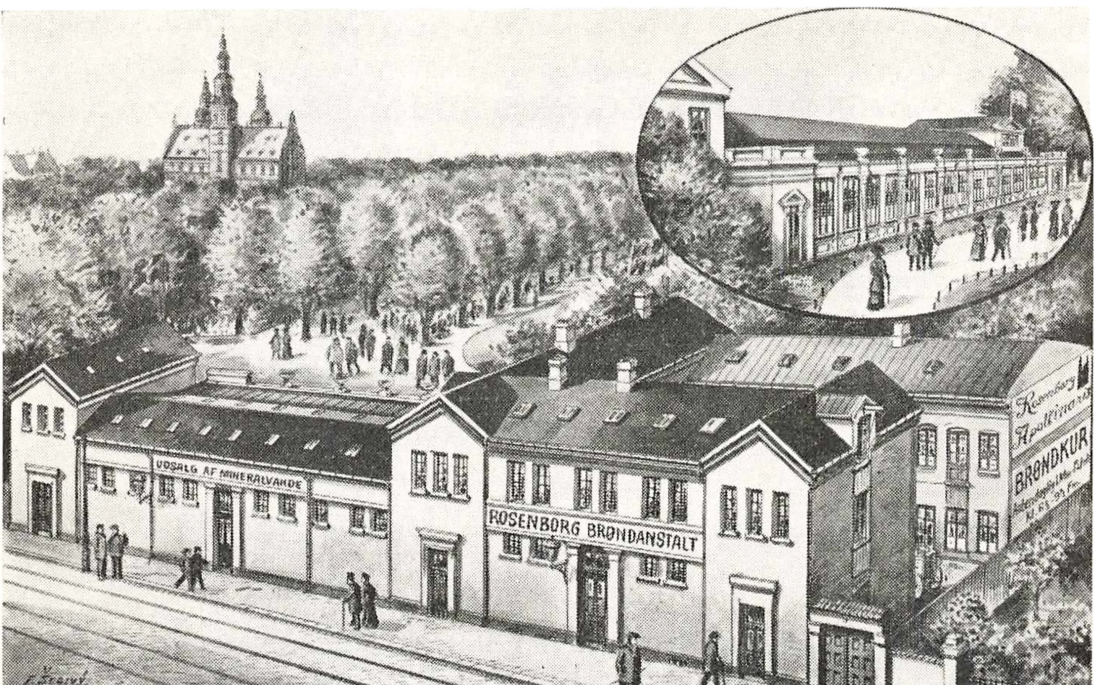
Rosenborg Brøndanstalt, drawing by Franz Šedivý, 1905.

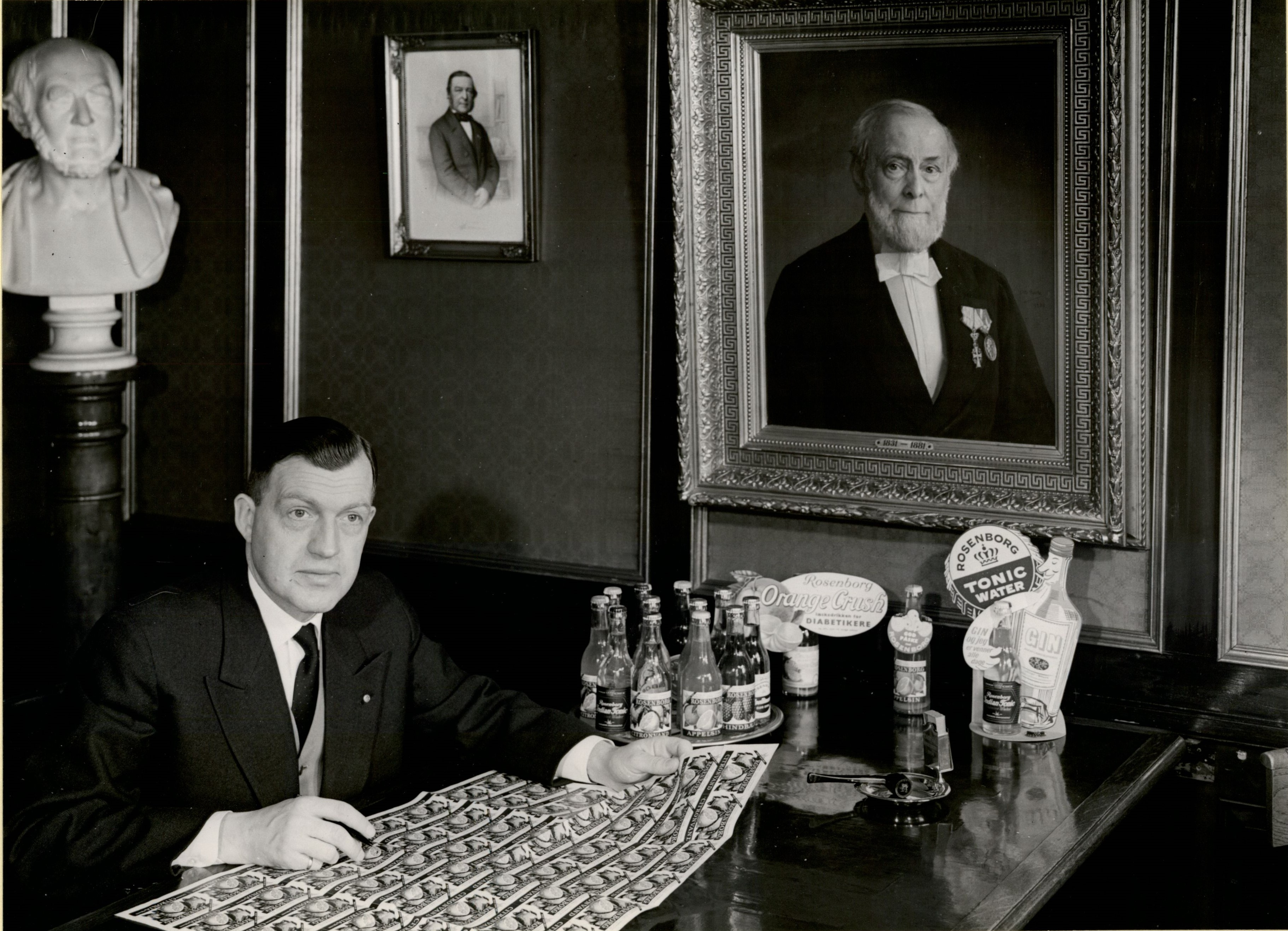
Eigil Andreasen in his office in Rosenborg Brøndanstalt. The painting on the wall is Otto Bache's portrait painting of E.A. Nørregaard. The bust is Herman Wilhelm Bissen's portrait bust of Ole Bang.

The idea for Rosenborg Brøndanstalt was conceived by professor Ole Bang. For some time, he had been interested in mineral water's medicinal properties. He raised the issue on the board of Tysernsten Sea Baths which had been established at Rysensten Bastion in 1724, The idea was met with support, both from the other board members and among the shareholders. In 1831, the board of directors handed in a formal application to establish the production of artificial mineral water in Copenhagen. Bang signed the application, Jonas Collin, Theodor Suhr, c. M. Lütken and Peder Mandrup Tuxen. The enterprise was initially created as a subsidy of Rysensten Sea Baths with the same statutes and board. The intention was to construct it on the same site. Still, Tuxen managed to persuade Frederick VI to contribute to the project with a strip of Rosenborg Garden in Gothersgade. The young chemical engineer E. A. Nørgaard was engaged as chief technical officer. He made a study trip to Berzelius’ installation in Stockholm. The technical equipment was ordered from the College of Advanced Technology's workshop. The buildings were built to a design by royal building inspector Jørgen Hansen Koch in 1833.

The popularity of the institution peaked in the 1880s. The mineral spa attracted some 700 guests a year, while the mineral water factory produced two to three million quarter bottles a year which were sold through pharmacies across the country. The product range included mineral water, limonade and tonic water.

In 1929, Rosenborg Brøndanstalt acquired the mineral water factory Sødring & Co. in Østerbro. The two companies' activities were moved to a new factory at Bispevej 25 in Bispebjerg the same year.

The company was in 1950 headed by Svend Sørensen (1908–). Board members were professor Carl Faurholt (1890–), director L. Tholstrup (1896–) and lawyer J. C. Bang (1913–).
