= Niels Ditlev Riegels =

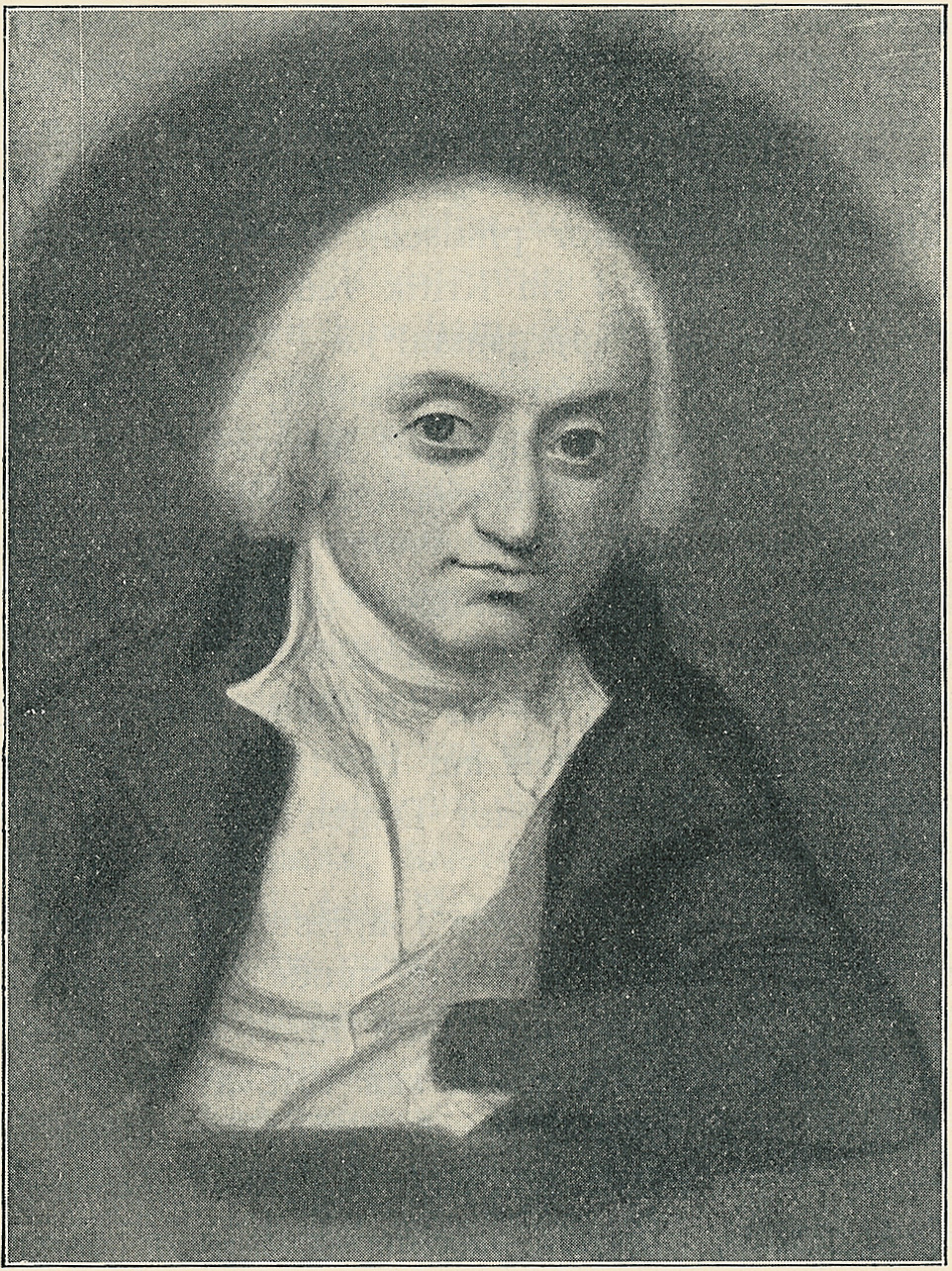
Niels Ditlev Riegels. Black/white reproduction of a painting by Jens Juel.

Niels Ditlev Riegels (also Riegelsen) (27 June 1755 – 24 August 1802) was a Danish historian, journalist and pamphleteer.

Niels Ditlev Riegels was known for his extensive authorship that was extremely critical of the Danish society and institutions. He was influenced by the radical enlightenment ideas of the French and English thinkers. The American historian H. Arnold Barton has characterised Riegels, along with Michael Gottlieb Birckner, as being one of "the most original thinkers" of the radical group of authors in Denmark in this period.

== Biography ==
The father of Niels Ditlev Riegels, Hans Riegelsen, was a learned merchant who had traveled widely and had a degree in philology. His mother, Bodil Birgitte Flindt, hailed from a family of landed proprietors. After having been home tutored by his father, who himself had unfulfilled dreams of a professorship, Niels Ditlev Riegels went to the University of Copenhagen in 1770.

At Copenhagen, Riegels studied theology, and he was known amongst his professors as having a rebellious and inquisitive mind. Despite several years of study, some of them spent at the University of Göttingen and University of Kiel, he never achieved his degree. Instead, he concentrated on the study of church history and published several small tracts in Latin before finally undertaking the task of writing an authoritative history of the church in Danish, of which the first volume was published in 1781. Perhaps on account of this, he was hired as tutor of the pages at the court of Queen dowager Juliane Maria. In this position he clandestinely participated in the coup against the ruling faction, one of whom was the Queen dowager herself. The coup was affected 14 April 1784, with the Crown Prince Frederick taking power alongside the Foreign minister Andreas Peter Bernstorff. Riegels was dismissed with a handsome pension of 1200 Danish rigsdaler for his efforts in the coup, yet he soon became a bitter opponent of the new government, mainly because he was not selected for the post of royal historiographer. From then on, he turned his authorship into a weapon against the ruling circles and everything connected to them. Despite the royal pension that he continued to receive until his death, he did not feel any obligations towards the new rule. He published a stream of pamphlets, books, journals and articles, most of these containing unrelenting criticism of the aristocracy, the church, the academic world and a wide variety of matters concerning how the government handled affairs.

== Writings ==
The beginning of Riegels' critical authorship can be traced to the third volume of his Fuldstændig Kirkehistorie ("Complete History of the Church, 1781–86) from 1786. Whereas the preceding volumes conformed to the official interpretation of the Scriptures, the third volume changed considerably in tone. It was a defense of Arianism and other heretical sects that had been suppressed during the late antiquity, creating parallels to contemporary times and how Riegels perceived the lack of tolerance in the Danish church. Many of Riegels' works were published anonymously, including the journal Kiøbenhavns Skilderie ("Image of Copenhagen", 1786–1790), which contained vivid eyewitness accounts of the sordid conditions of the inmates of the penitentiaries, poor houses and insane asylums of Copenhagen. From these experiences he campaigned for a reform of the insane asylum called Pesthuset (later St Hans), with the effect that the donations poured in, though the needed reforms did not take place until long after Riegels' death. Thanks to the deliberate laxity of the post-1784 government, the restrictive censorship laws of Ove Høegh-Guldberg were rarely enforced; yet, one exception was in 1790 when Riegels was fined 200 rigsdaler for his Julemærker fra Landet og Byen ("Weather forecast from the Country and from the City") which had in effect called for an institution of a General Assembly of the Estates.

Riegels had meanwhile moved to Falster where he had married and bought a farmstead. Since his university days, he had shown an interest in the natural sciences, which amongst other things led to him writing "Forsøg til chirurgiens historie" ("An attempt at the History of Surgery", 1786. Latin version in 1788 De Fatis faustis et infaustis Chirurgiae for which he received honorary medals from Catherine II of Russia, Gustav III of Sweden and the Prussian minister Ewald Friedrich von Hertzberg). He had also begun studying animal anatomy, an interest he pursued by dissecting various farm animals as well as practicing as an unofficial veterinary. He published several Latin papers on his findings and corresponded with physicians around the world, among others the American Founding Father Benjamin Rush.

He had not, however, relinquished his critical authorship. The 1790s saw the publication of several voluminous historical works, amongst them Forsøg til Femte Christians Historie ("An attempt at the History of Christian V of Denmark", 1792), Udkast til Fierde Friederichs Historie efter Høyer ("Outline of the History of Frederick IV of Denmark according to Andreas Hojer", 2 vols., 1795–1800) and Smaa historiske Skrifter ("Minor Historical Works", 3 vols, 1796–1798, containing "A Life of Christian VI of Denmark") which was as critical as his earlier works.

Another interest of Riegels' was the theory of education. He wrote a series of articles on this subject around 1788-1789, inspired by John Locke and Jean-Jacques Rousseau among others. In 1800, he moved to Sorø where he opened a school based on these theories, and died 2 years later aged 47 of a seizure in 1802.

== Sources ==
- H. Arnold Barton, Scandinavia in the Revolutionary Era 1760-1815, University of Minnesota Press, 1986. ISBN 0-8166-1393-1.
- Morten Petersen, Oplysningens Gale Hund - en biografi om Niels Ditlev Riegels, Aschehoug, 2003. ISBN 87-11-11643-9.
