= Michael Gottlieb Birckner =

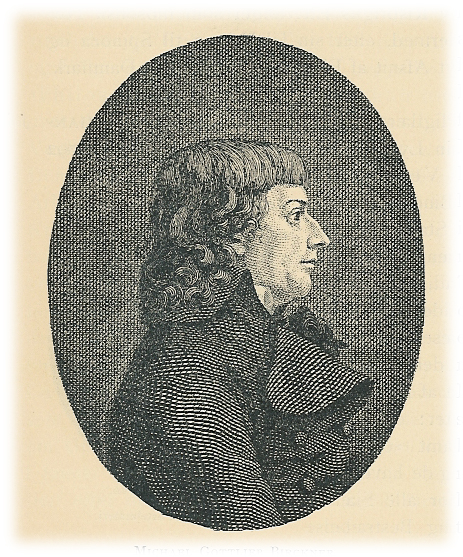
Michael Gottlieb Birckner

Michael Gottlieb Birckner (21 August 1756 – 1 December 1798) was a Danish priest and philosopher.

Birckner especially explored the subject of Freedom of Speech. The American historian H. Arnold Barton has characterised Birckner, along with Niels Ditlev Riegels, as being "one of the most original thinkers" of the radical group of authors in Denmark in this period. The Danish jurist Peter Germer in his book The Nature of Freedom of Speech (Ytringsfrihedens Væsen, 1973) shows that Birckners ideas was akin to ideas that Scottish-American philosopher Alexander Meiklejohn proposed in his Free Speech and Its Relation to Self-Government (1948).

== Biography ==
Michael Gottlieb Birckner was born in Copenhagen. At age three, he lost his mother Anna Marie (born Wiborg), and half a year later his father, brickmason Johan Michael Birckner, died. The city mortician took in the orphan, and in due time Birckner graduated from the city's Latin school in 1772. He achieved his theological degree in 1784. He had also spent his time at the university studying philosophy and philology, and he especially excelled in modern languages, he spoke German like a native and he wrote verses in English. He wanted a position as a priest, but he disliked the parlors of the rich and powerful, so he did not achieve a call until 1790. The position was as a German minister on the isolated island of Föhr which was part of the kingdom of Denmark-Norway at the time.

Before Birckner left the capital he had become a proponent of the philosophy of Immanuel Kant, which at that time was becoming popular in Denmark. But he was also under the influence of the radical French anti-clergy rationalism. He had published an article in the influential Danish periodical Minerva with the title An answer to the question: Should the nobility be suppressed? (July 1790). His answer to the question in the title was affirmative, provided that the privileges of nobility is an injustice and that the burgher can become "that which at present only the nobility is, without upsetting society as a whole". The article was soon translated into German and a reviewer of the Göttingische gelärdes Anzeigen (1792, p. 1899) praised it highly.

== Stay at Föhr ==
Birckners stay at Föhr did not turn out to be as desolate as he and his friends had feared. He passed his time with studies, social visits and a pursuit to "form a young man into a productive citizen". The inhabitants of the island was pleased by his "philosophical" preachings which he held every third Sunday. He did express regret at not being within easy reach of the literary means of the capital, but he learned to pass his time thinking instead. It became his habit to first think a subject matter through in his mind before reading what others had written about it. He especially worked on the problem about the freedom of press and its limits, which among other things the recent conviction of the satiric poet Peter Andreas Heiberg had incurred in Danish debate. In his solitude he expressed his thoughts on the matter in writing and the first of his many treaties on the subject was published in the Minerva in March 1791.

== Chaplain ==
The following year he was surprised to learn that his friends had petitioned on his behalf for the chaplaincy in Korsør. In the beginning, he was not pleased with the transition to the small provincial town in Zealand because he had to preach twice every Sunday instead of once every third Sunday. But after making the move, little by little his sentiments changed. He regularly was present by the dinner table of the vicar Frederik Plum, who later became bishop of Fyn, and Birckner found company with which to share his spiritual and philosophical sentiments. It was at the Plums that he met Henriette Christine Hornemann, the daughter of vicar Jacob Hornemann, sister of the philosopher Christian Hornemann, and in 1795 he married this gifted young woman.

The journey to his new position had incurred a coughing sickness which over time became very serious. His income was very low, and he often suffered from want so badly that he at one time considered giving up the chaplaincy in favour of a position as a teacher and letting his wife contribute to the household by letting her serve as a chambermaid.

== Struggle for freedom of the press ==
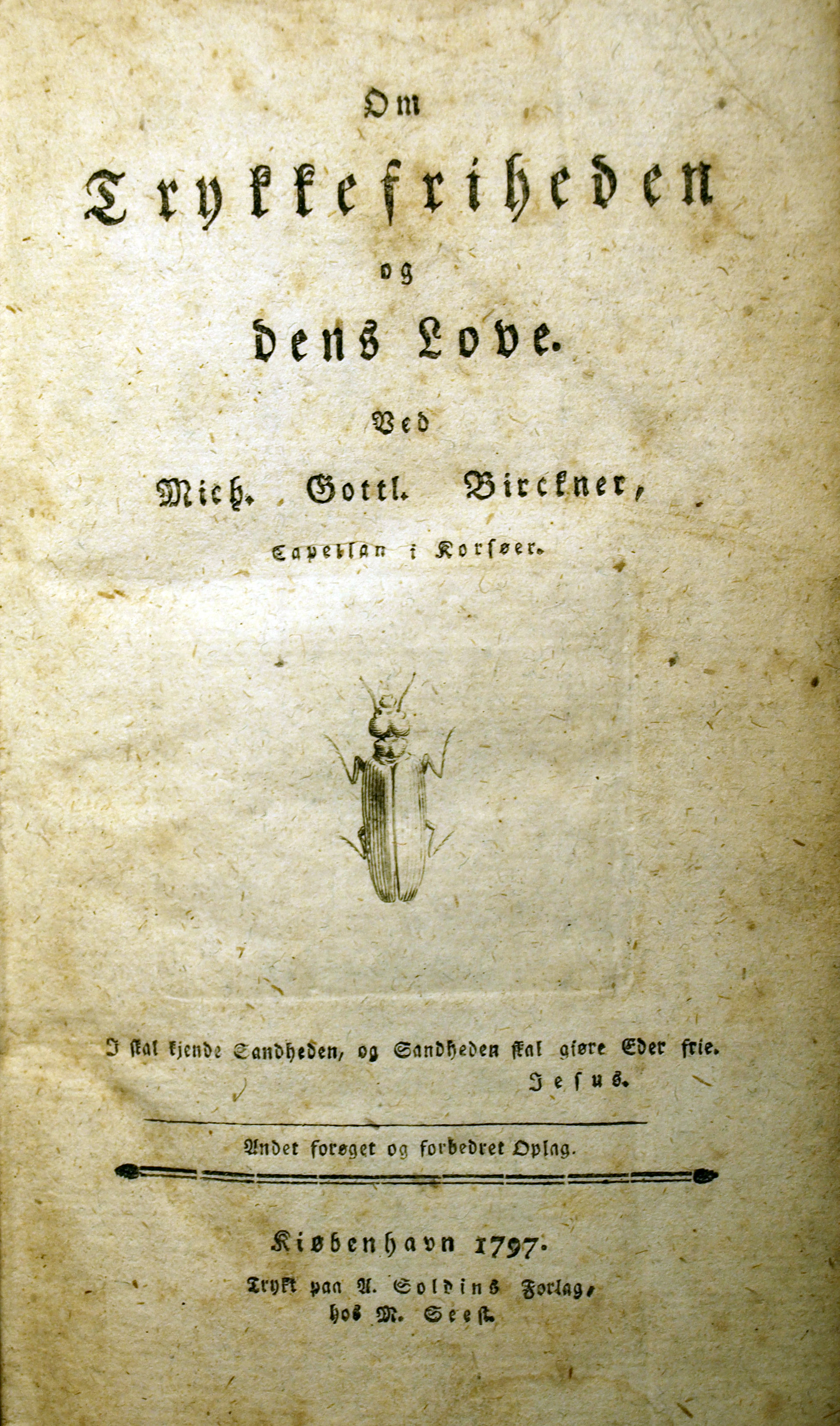
The titlepage to the second and extended edition of Birckners On the Freedom of Press and its Laws from 1797.

But neither his sickness nor his poverty prevented him from continuing his philosophical endeavours. When the bishop of Zealand Nicolai Balle Edinger had reported the poet Malthe Conrad Bruuns recently published book The Catechism of the Aristocrats (Aristocraternes Catechismus, 1796) to the authorities for infringing the press laws, Birckner anonymously published a small tract which criticised the bishop for playing the part of head of police instead of minding his ecclesiastical pursuits.

However his real struggle for freedom of the press was not carried out anonymously. He had already previously shown that the Danish laws regarding this subject did not allow for a complete freedom of the press. It was to achieve this goal that he published his major work On the Freedom of the Press and its Law ("Om Trykkefriheden og dens Love", 1797).

In this book he claims the importance of freedom of press as a powerful means of putting ideas into circulation and thereby enlighten the monarch of things that he would otherwise have been ignorant of. He also writes about it being a "revolution from above", when a "noble and patriotic" man, "brimming with feelings for the general good of man", at once appear among the powerful and without restraint "sacrifices his own splendor and absolutism". These words were aimed at the reigning crown prince Frederick, who had shown considerable influences from the tolerant enlightenment ideas in his early years on the throne.

But Birckner does not only demand freedom to write about the affairs of government, he also demands freedom of speech in matters of religion. He shows that the way to achieve insight into the "moral truths" can only happen by discussing it in the open. However Birckner does propose some limits on the freedom of press, he does not think it should be allowed to publicly call for rebellion, that is urging the people to overthrow the constitution of the state or in other ways oppose the actions of the government with physical force. Neither, Birckner says, should it be allowed to defame the private affairs of a man in his home, something which has no public interest and it violates the private sphere of the individual.

The book became a bestseller in Denmark-Norway. A second revised and improved edition appeared the same year, and a third printing was made for the first volume of the Collected Works of Birckner (a work which had 2.100 subscribers at the beginning of its publication, a very high figure in Danish literary history). Furthermore, he translated the book into German and it was printed in the German periodical Beiträge zur Veredlung der Menschheit, 2. vol., 1. part, 1797, and the same year published as a stand-alone work under the title Ueber die Preszfreiheit und ihre Gesetze, von dem Verfasser selbst aus dem Dänischen übersetzt, durchgesehen und herausgegeben von C.J.R. Christiani, Kopenhagen und Leipzig.

These ideas met opposition from several contemporary writers. Some thought Birckner went too far in his support of free speech, while others thought there should be no limits whatsoever. This prompted Birckner to publish his Further Reflections on the Freedom of Press and its Laws ("Videre Undersøgelser om Trykkefriheden og dens Love") the following year (1798). His response is especially aimed at the criticism posed by professor Johan Frederik Vilhelm Schlegel. Only at one point in this book does he change his stance from his previous work, and that is only "half unwillingly" he thinks that writers who "with their filthy imagination attempts to awaken impure desires in his readers", these individuals should be sentenced "a fitting punishment". His "half unwillingness" for this stems from the fact that he sees "what the result would be, of such a power administered by the judges of geniuses, and how easily such a power can be abused most savagely... And yet, all art and beauty be damned, if it misleads just a single person to stray from the path of virtue".

== Death ==
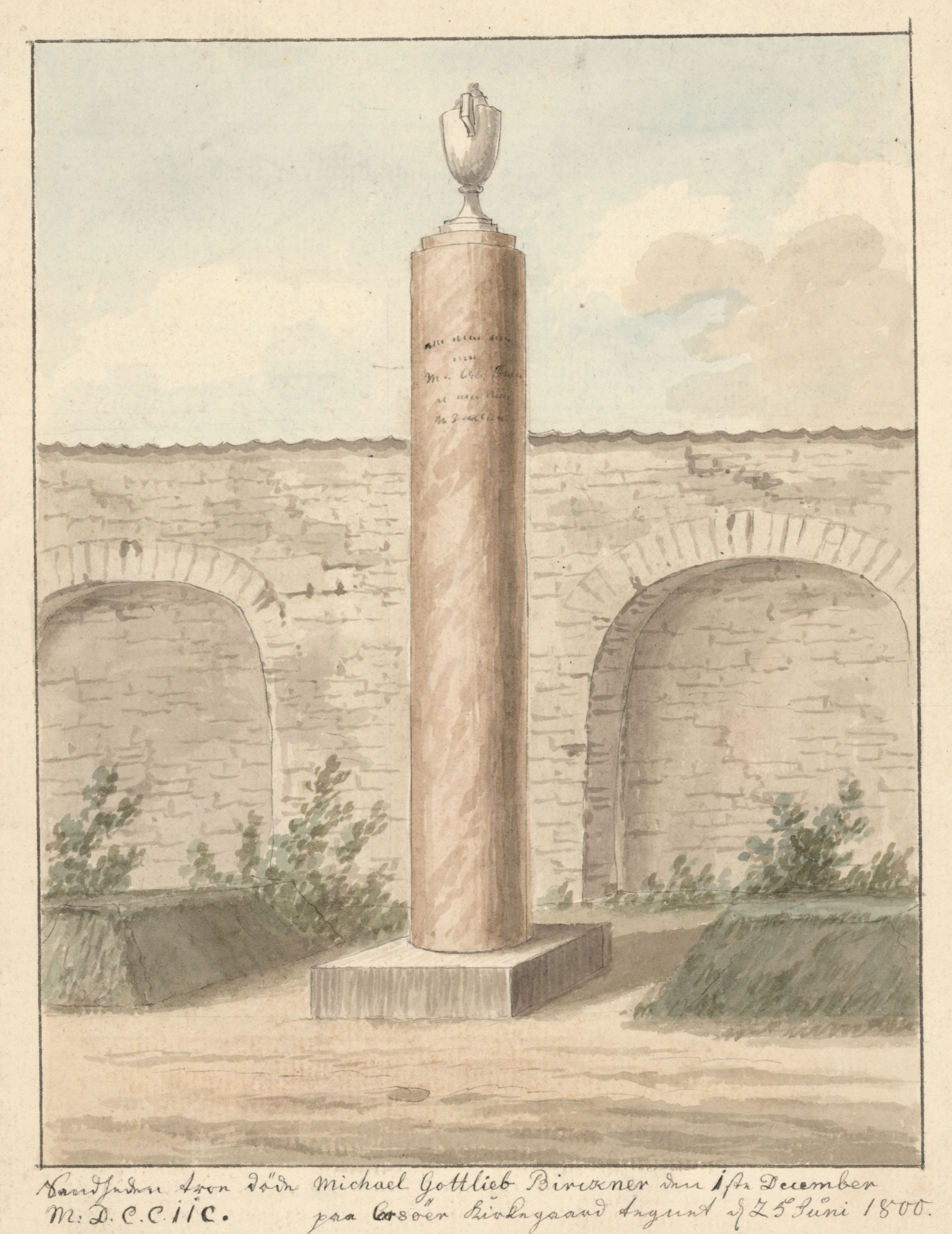
Memorial erected by Birckner 's widow next to St. Paul's Church with economic support from Jonas Collin.

His struggle for freedom of speech was not looked upon favorably in government circles. Nevertheless, he was appointed vicar of Vemmelev and Hammershøj on the 28 November, 1798, an appointment that would have meant the end of his poverty. But this royal grace came too late, his illness had become lethal and he died the 1st of December the same year. His contribution to Danish literature was first acknowledged after his death. His friends praised his character and 2100 subscribers signed up for the first edition of his collected works. Furthermore, they collected 2500 rigsdaler that was donated to his grieving widow and children.

== Collected works ==
Birckner had already begun working on a collected edition of his works prior to his death. This collection was to include all his writings except the two anonymous tracts against bishop Balle. He did manage to publish three volumes of this collection, and the fourth volume was published in 1800 edited by Anders Sandøe Ørsted and prefaced by an account of the last days of Birckner written by dean Frederik Carl Gutfeld (Samlede Skrifter, 4 vols., 1797-1800).

== Sources ==
- H. Arnold Barton, Scandinavia in the Revolutionary Era 1760-1815, University of Minnesota Press, 1986. ISBN 0-8166-1393-1.
