= Sugar-baker =

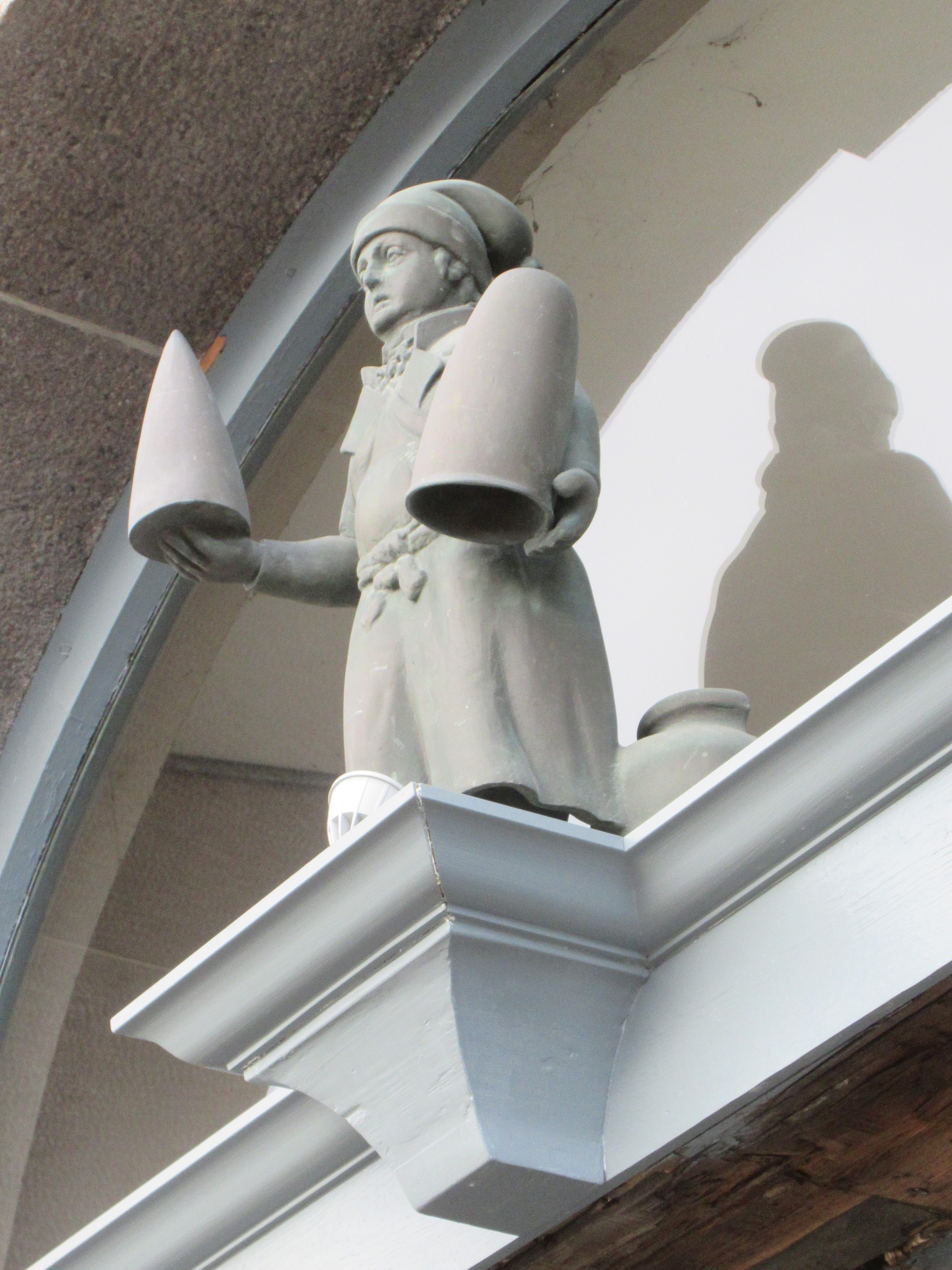
A sugar-baker, holding a sugarloaf in one hand and a sugar tin in the other, seen above the gate of a former sugar house at Nyhavn 11 in Copenhagen, Denmark

A sugar-baker was the owner of a sugar house, but also for those who worked in the sugar house, a factory for the refining of raw sugar from Barbados or Jamaica. Sugar refining would normally be combined with sugar trading, which was a lucrative business. The architectural historian Kerry Downes gives an example of one sugar baker's house in Liverpool being estimated to bring in £40,000 a year in trade from Barbados.

== Process ==
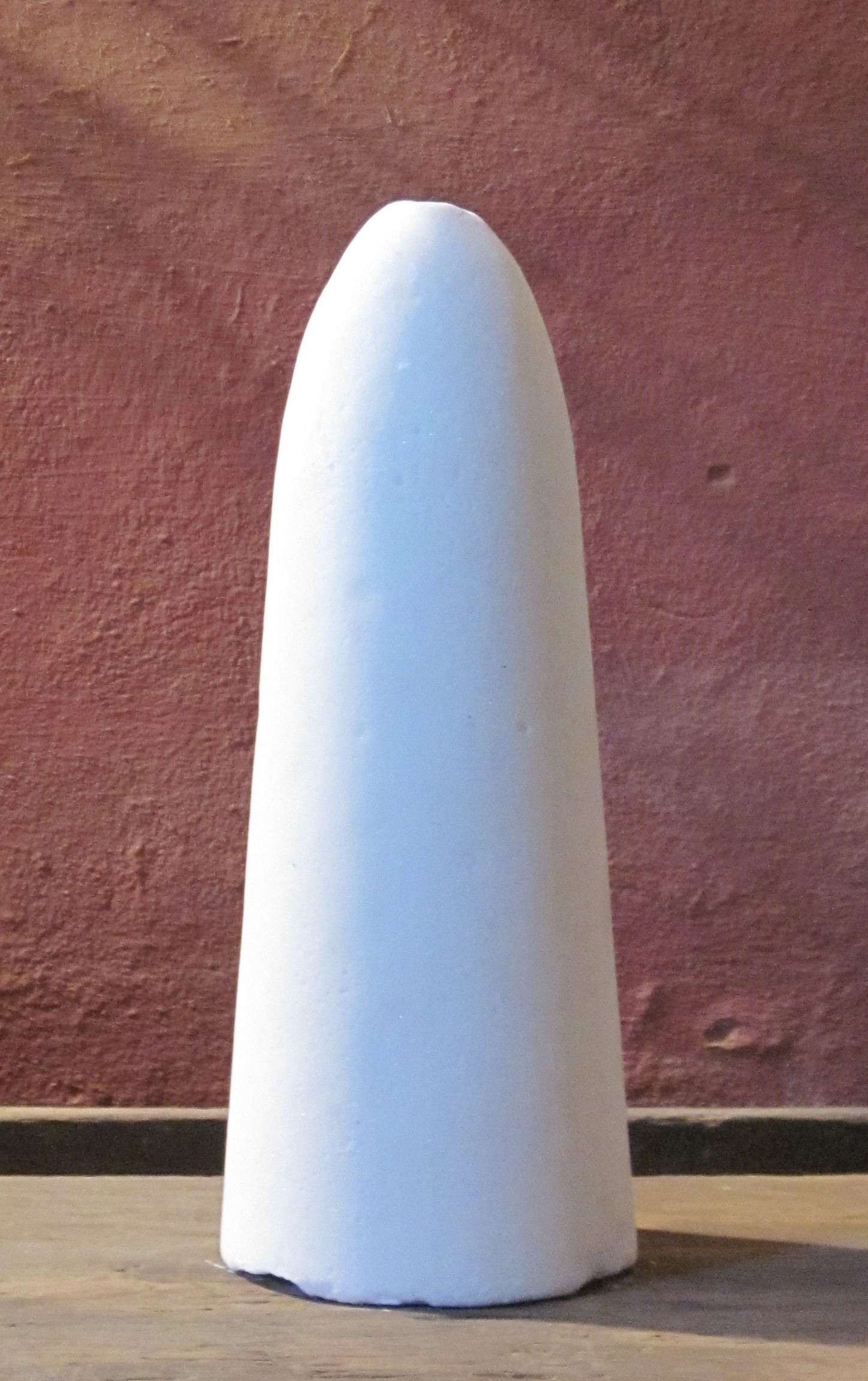
Finished sugarloaf

Sugar from the West Indies was imported in the form of muscovado, a soft brown sugar containing a proportion of molasses. Refinement was a multi-stage process: in the first stage the brown sugar was several times dissolved in water, mixed with lime and evaporated. The lime neutralized the naturally acidic sugar solution, causing impurities such as plant albumin, gums and waxes, to precipitate. After the final evaporation the sugar was placed in a clay mould, in the conical shape of the sugarloaf, and baked. The last stage was to cover the open end of the mould with a cap of wet clay. The moisture from this percolated slowly through the sugar, carrying with it any final impurities but without dissolving the sugar. When the cap had dried the mould was inverted and the loaf removed.

== Sources and external links ==
- Kerry Downes. Sir John Vanbrugh: A Biography (London: Sidgwick and Jackson, 1987)
- "Industries: Introduction"—A History of the County of Middlesex: Volume 2: General; Ashford, East Bedfont with Hatton, Feltham, Hampton with Hampton Wick, Hanworth, Laleham, Littleton (1911), pp. 121–132. (Date accessed: 31 March 2006)
- "Sugar Refiners & Sugarbakers"—A database of some of those involved in the sugar refining industry, mainly in the UK, 16th to 20th century. (Date accessed: 6 September 2008)
