= Christen Niemann Rosenkilde =

Danish actor and writer (1786–1861)

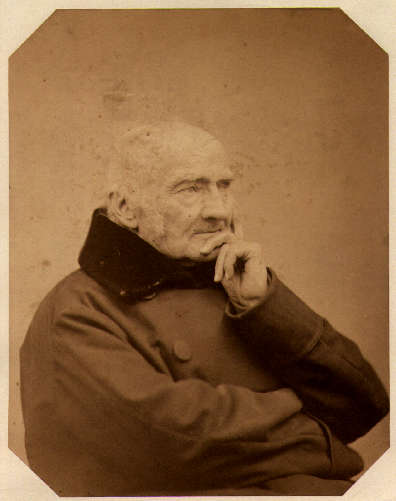
Christen Niemann Rosenkilde

Christen Niemann Rosenkilde (8 January 1786 – 12 November 1861) was a Danish actor and writer.

== Early life ==
Rosenkilde was born on 8 January 1768 in Slagelse, the son of bookbinder Lars Rosenkilde (1758–1808) and Henricha Lund (c. 1749–1819). He matriculated from Slagelse Latin School 1804. He later worked as a private tutor before being employed as a clerk (kordegn) at the Church of Our Lady in Aarhus and as assistant teacher (hører) at the parish's public school. In 1812, he became cantor at Aarhus Cathedral. He was also promoted to head teacher at the local poor school.

== Acting career ==
Tosenkilde was a skilled violinist. His introduction to acting was through the club Polyhymnias' amateur theatre performances. Rosenkilde made his debut at the Royal Danish Theatre on 19 March 1816 as Balozi in C. Schall's singspiele De tre Galninger. His last performance at the Royal Danish Theatre was on 7 September 1861 as Sivert Posekigger in Ludvig Holberg's The Political Tinker. Rosenkilde and N. P. Nielsen were the two first actors to receive the Knight's Cross of the Order of the Dannebrog.

== Writings ==
In 1818–1824, Rosenkilde published the weekly magazine Brevduen.In 1825–26, he worked as co-editor of Kjøbenhavns Morgenblad. He translated plays and adapted opera librettos. He had his debut as a playwright withVennernes Fest (1826), a vaudeville set during the Battle of Copenhagen, which played 21 times with himself in one of the roles. His next play, Den dramatiske Skrædder (1828), an attempt to create a modern version of Holberg's The Political Tinker, was a huge fiasco. Other writings include some satirical short stories and letters. He embarked on writing his memoirs but only got to his childhood. His writings were published posthumously in two volumes as Efterladte Skrifter (1877) by Peter Hansen.

== Personal life ==
Rosenkilde married on 7 May 1811 in Aarhus to Maren Falck Christensen, (1786-1852). She was the daughter of skipper and later merchant Jørgen Christensen (1750–1808) and Maren Falck. They were the parents of actor Adolph Rosenkilde, photographer Georg Rosenkilde and actress Julie Sødring.

Rosenkilde died on 12 November 1861. He is buried at Copenhagen's Garrison Cemetery.
