= Julie Sødring =

Danish actor and autobiographer (1823–1894)

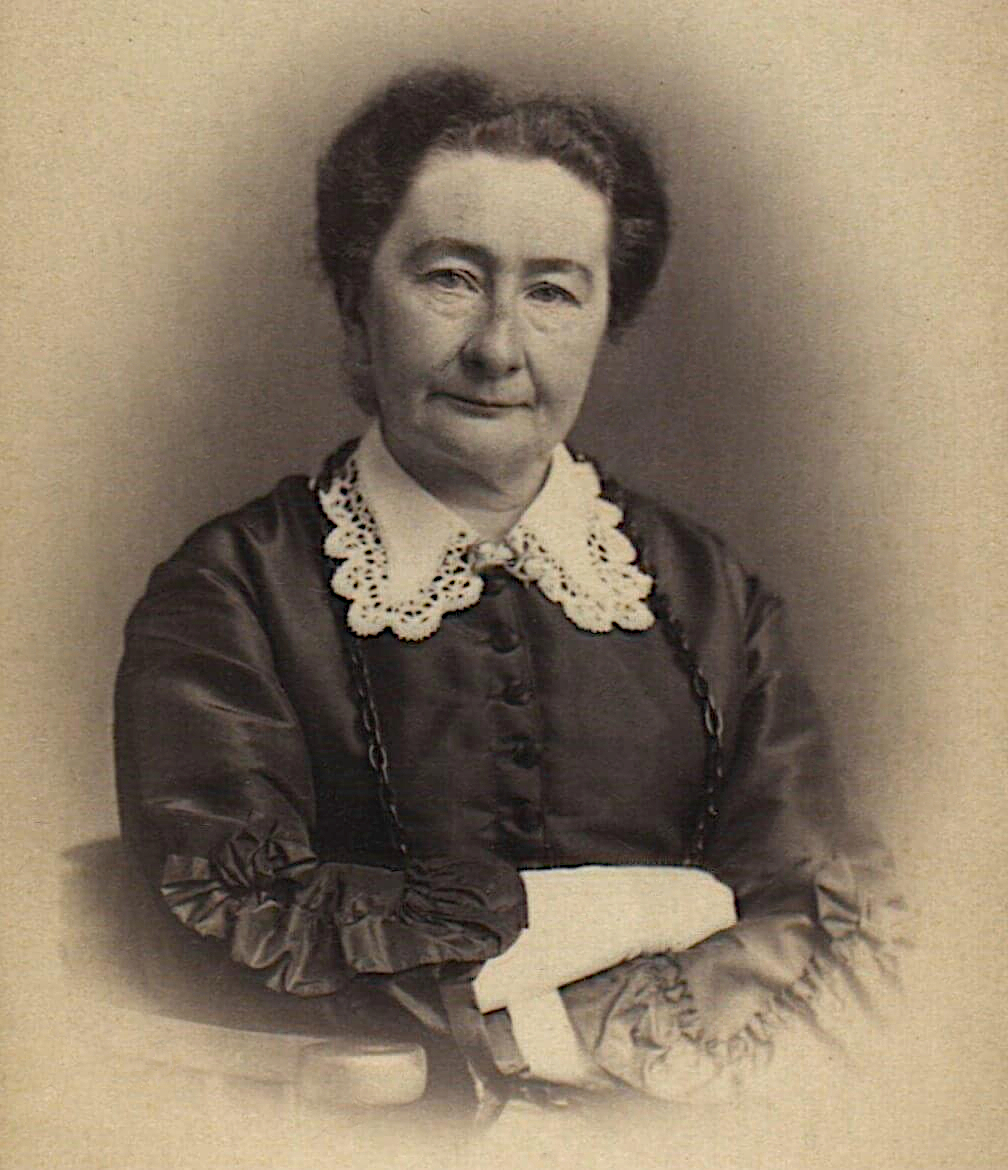
- Born: 19 July 1823; Copenhagen, Denmark
- Died: 17 April 1894 (aged 70)
- Occupation: Actress
- Spouse: Christopher Hansen Sødring (m. 1849)
- Children: 5
- Writing career
- Years active: 1843–1875

Julie Weber Sødring née Rosenkilde (19 July 1823 – 17 April 1894) was a self-taught Danish actress who made her debut in 1843 as Madam Rust in Henrik Hertz's comedy Sparekassen. She was engaged by the Royal Danish Theatre in 1847 where she played roles in plays by the four H's: Holberg, Heiberg, Hertz and Hostrup, often those of older women. Although she never took leading roles, she became popular with her audiences. Sødring retired at the age of 51, after which she recounted her biography to her youngest son Marius who published it in two volumes as Erindringer (1894–95).

== Early life and family ==
Born in Copenhagen on 19 July 1823, Rosenkilde was the daughter of the actor Christen Niemann Rosenkilde (1786–1861) and his wife, Maren née Falck Christensen. She was the couple's fifth child. The family lived in a small apartment on Adelgade. When she was six, they moved to Østerbro (Østerbrogade No. 44-46). In 1843, they moved to an apartment at Nyhavn 11. When her father discovered she was a talented imitator of two elderly aunts, he encouraged her to learn theatrical roles of older women as a basis for her debut.

In May 1849, Julie married the Norwegian-born mineral water manufacturer Christopher Hansen Sødring (1822–1881) with whom she had five children: Rose Cecile (1850), Christen (1852), Johanne Louise (1854), Christopher (1856) and Marius Frederik Carl Adolph (1858).

== Career ==
As was the practice at the time, Sødring prepared three roles for her debut, receiving help from the established actresses Anna Nielsen, Johanne Luise Heiberg and Henriette Jørgensen. As a result, in 1843, she performed the old spinster in Le domino noir, Madam Rust in Henrik Hertz's Sparekassen, followed in 1844 by old Madam Buurman in Peter Andreas Heiberg's De Uadskillelige.

Sødring became well known for her roles as spinsters or elderly wives in Ludvig Holberg's plays or in Danish comedies. Thanks to her subdued approach and lack of make-up, she brought her characters to life, often effectively emphasizing her presentations with comic satire. Choosing her roles herself, she became associated with plays by the four H's: Holberg, Heiberg, Hertz and Hostrup, Plagued increasingly by illness, she retired from the stage in 1875 at the age of 51.

Julie Sødring died in Copenhagen on 27 April 1894. With the assistance of her youngest son Marius, her memoirs Erinfringer were published in two volumes (1994–95).

Julie Sødrings Vej in harlottenlund is named after her.
