= Lakajgården =

Building complex in Copenhagen, Denmark

Coordinates: 55°40′18″N 12°31′38″E

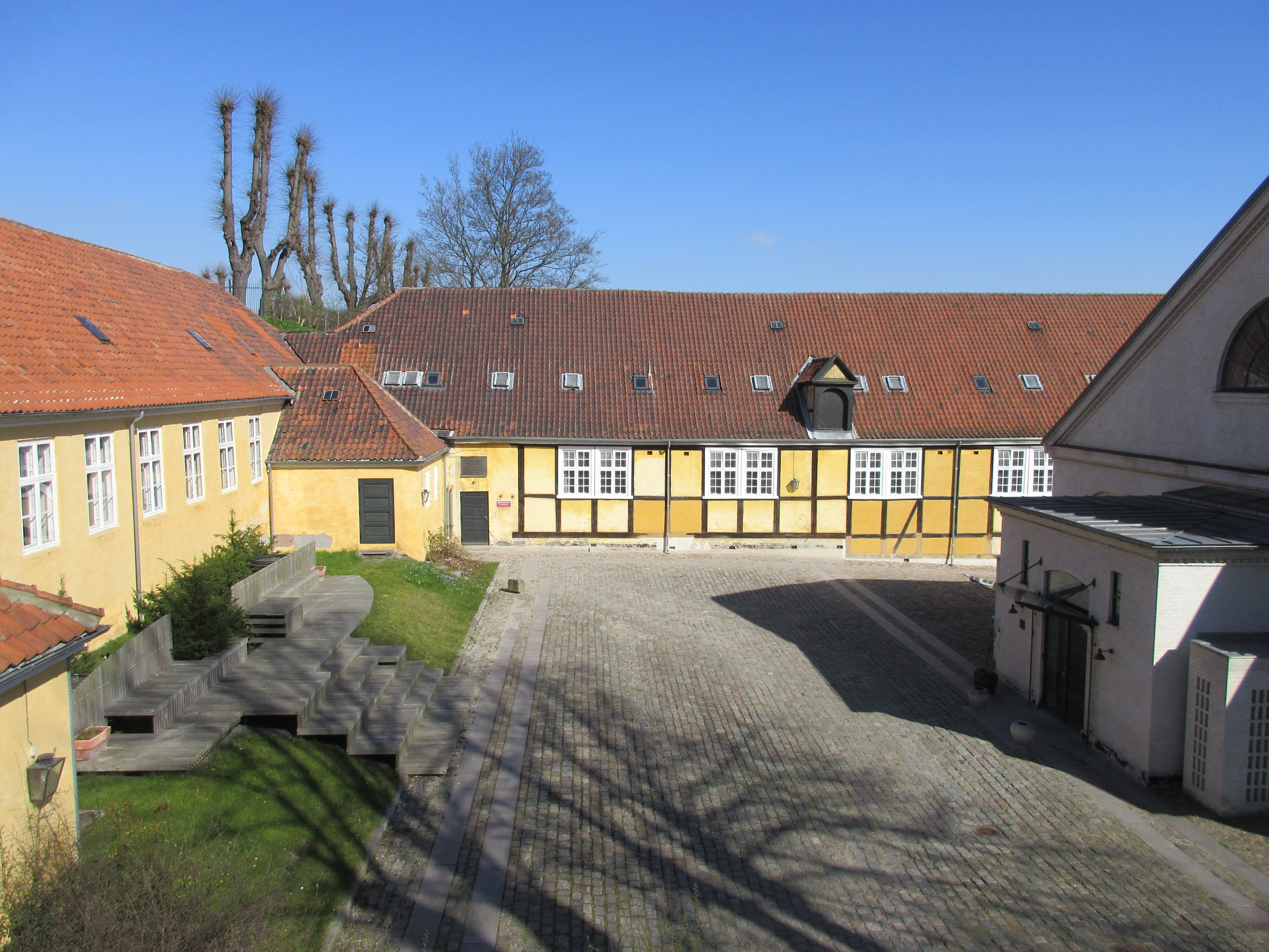
Lakajgården

Lakajgården (literally "The Lackey Complex") is a complex of early 18th-century buildings located on Roskildevej in the Frederiksberg district of Copenhagen, Denmark. Located adjacent to Frederiksberg Palace, a former royal summer residence, it was originally built as stables, kitchen facilities and residential quarters for lackeys. It is a three-winged complex of low yellow buildings with red tile roofs and white windows and cornices. It has been in use by the Royal Danish Military Academy that now occupies Frederiksberg Palace since 1868. The buildings are listed on the Danish Registry of Protected Buildings and Places. A new riding hall was built on the central courtyard of the complex in the late 19th century and has now been converted into an auditorium. It is not listed.

== History ==
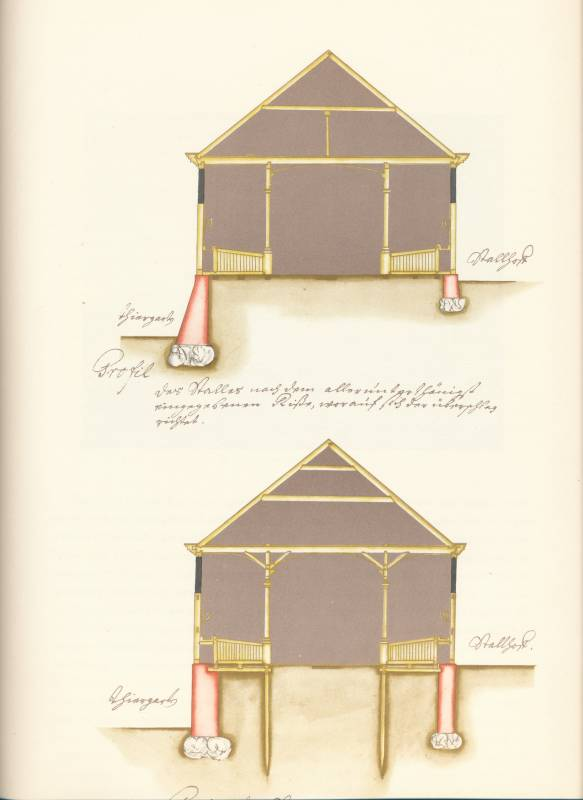
Rendering for the stables

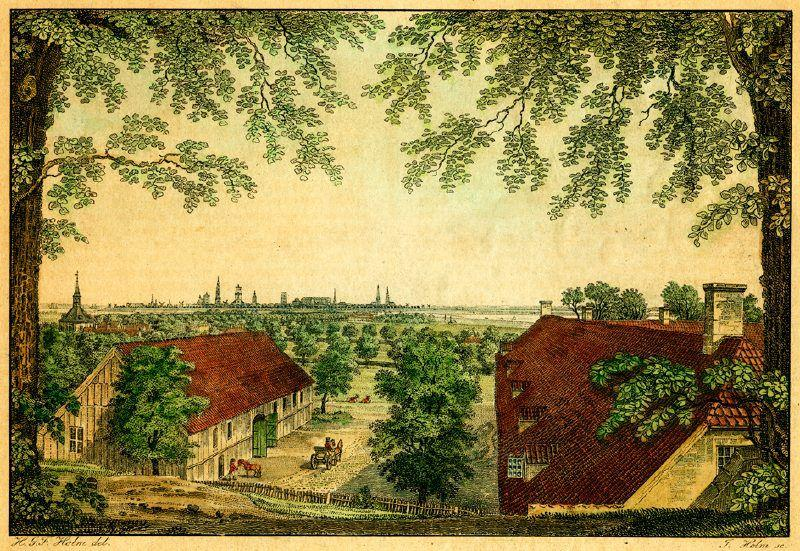
Lakajgården seen from Frederiksberg Palace on a drawing by H. G. F. Holm from c. 1823

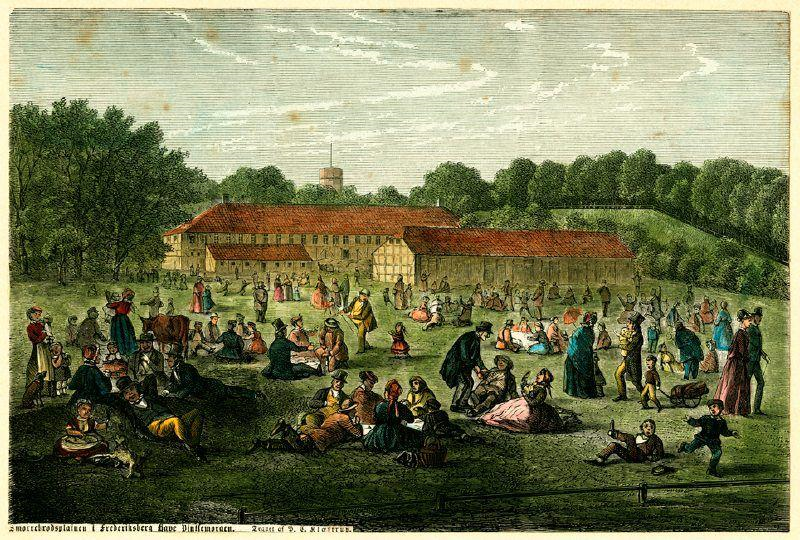
Lakajgården seen from the picknick lawn on a drawing by P. C. Klæstrup, 1868

Frederiksberg Palace was completed on a local hilltop in 1703. Lakajgården was built on an adjacent site lower down on a hill to provide residential quarters for lackeys as well as new kitchen facilities and stables. The kitchen had originally been located in the basement of the palace, but moving it to a separate building reduced the risk of fires. The Lakajgården site was dug down into the hill to provide level ground for the construction, and a tunnel was constructed between the complex and the palace. The stables had room for 64 horses and the wagon house had room for four carriages.

Lakajgården was built on lower ground just east of the palace in the 1720s to a design by Johan Conrad Ernst. The complex was dug into the hill to keep it from spoiling the views to and from the palace.

Lakajgården was taken over by the Royal Danish Military Academy along with the palace in 1868. The kitchen wing was converted to a laboratory. Two thirds of the Stables Wing was converted into a drill house in 1870. The rest of the stables remained in use as stables for horses until 1974.

== Architecture ==
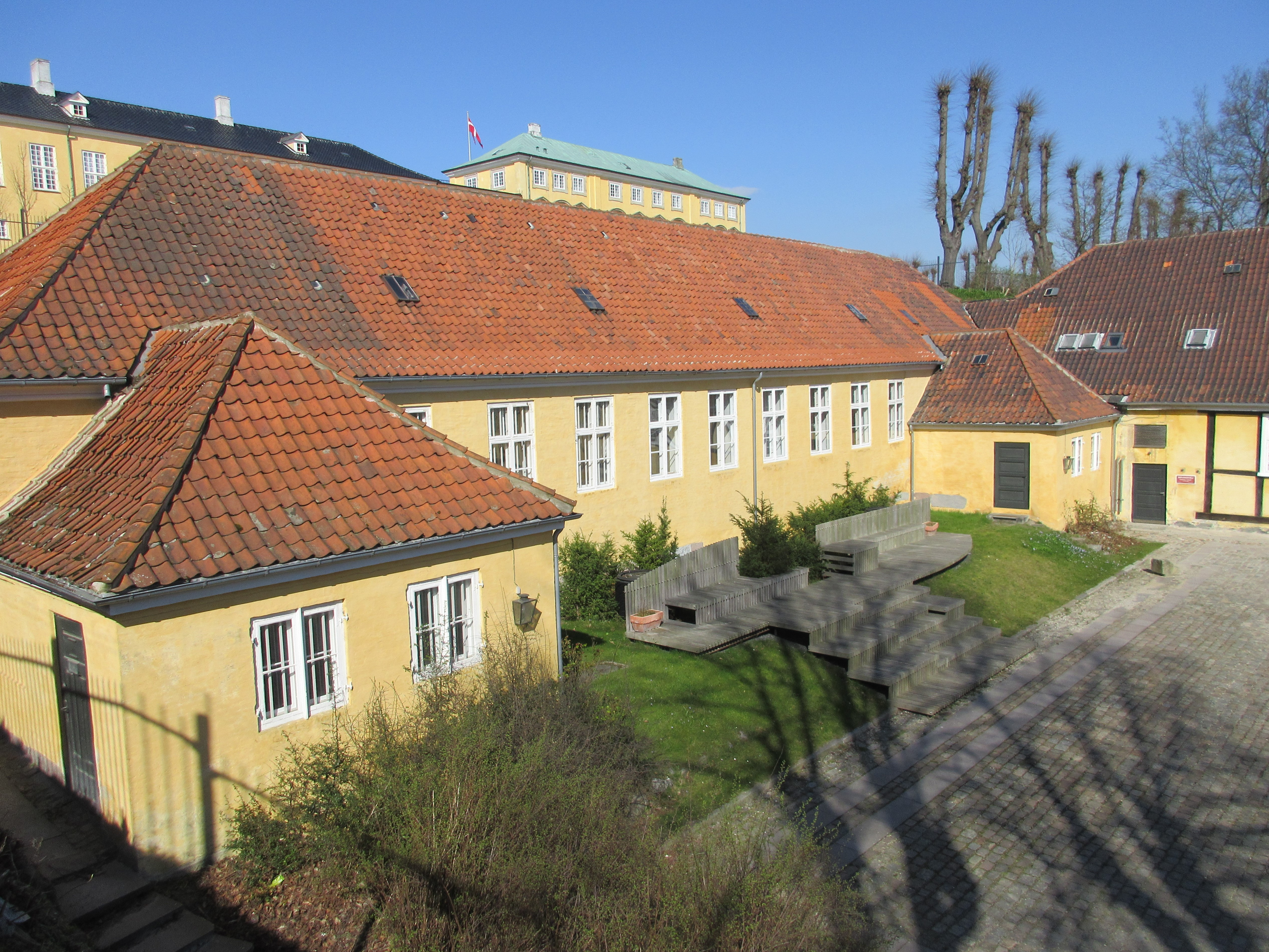
The eastern end of the north wing seen from Roskildevej

Lakajården is a three-winged complex surrounding a courtyard that is open to the south facing Roskildevej. All three wings have yellow finishing on the exterior walls, hipped or half-hipped red tile roofs, and white windows and cornices.

The west wing is the former kitchen and is therefore also known as the Kitchen Wing or Laboratory Wing. It is one storey, built from brick and has a hipped roof. A small, slightly lower appendix projects from the east side of the building at each end. These are the remains of an extension which originally ran in the full length of the building but where the central part was removed in 1870.

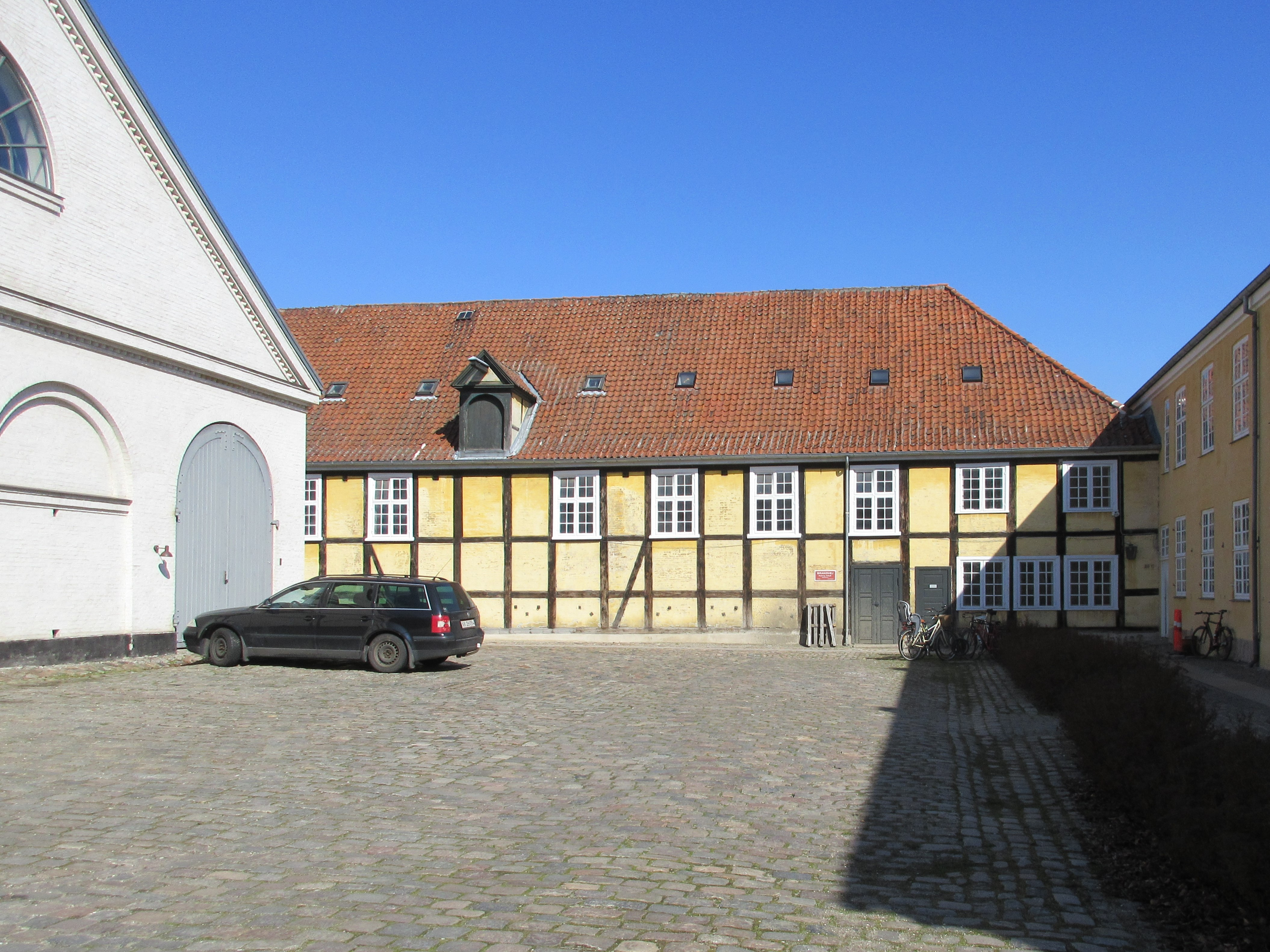
The eastern end of the north wing seen from Roskildevej

The long north wing is the former stables. The building has black-painted, exposed timber framing, but the timber framing has partly been removed on the two gables. The roof is half hipped at its eastern end and is hipped at its western end. The surviving part of the stables is located in the eastern end of the building. Its interior contains wooden columns with faux marbling.

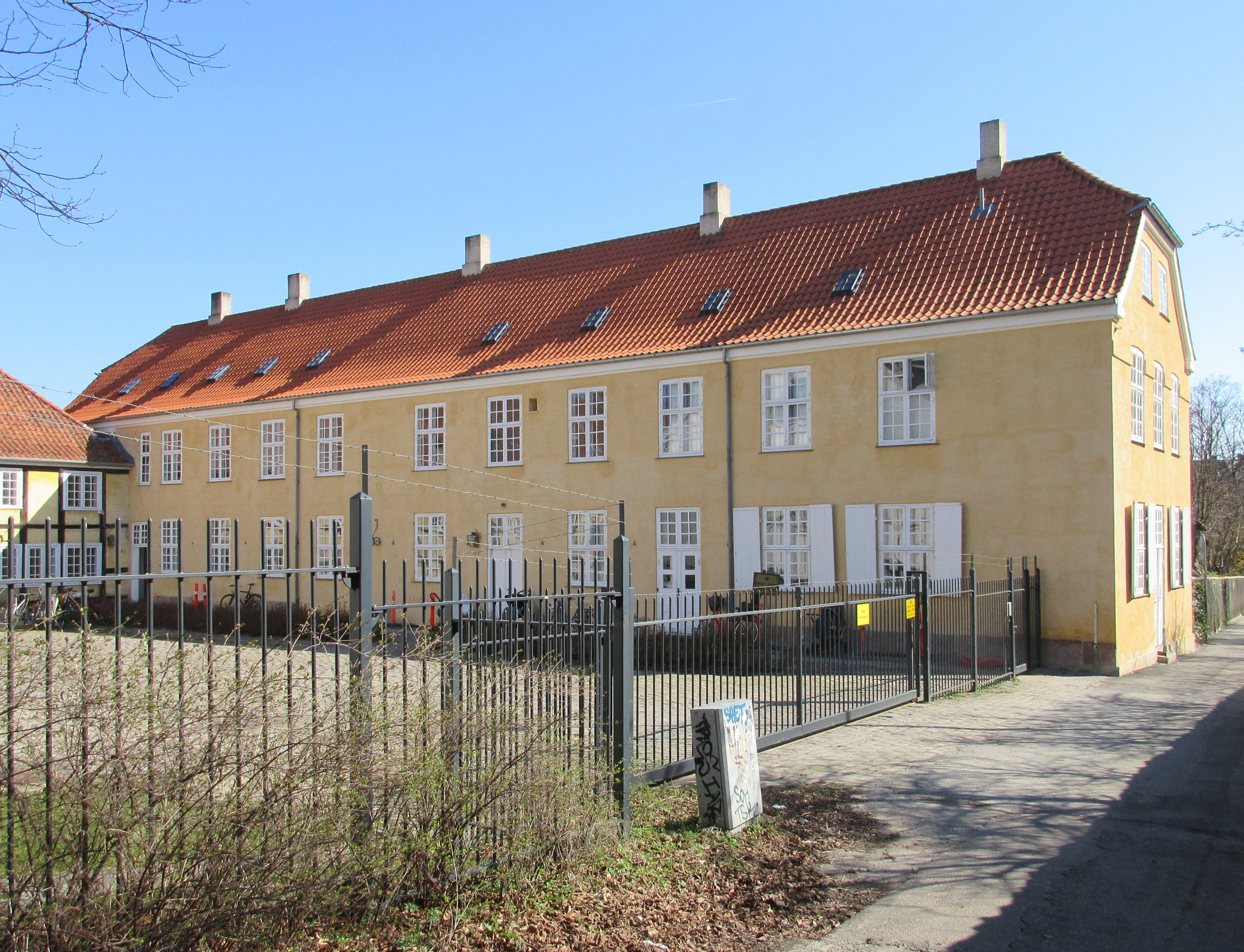
The eastern Residential Wing

The east wing is built in brick and has a half hipped tile roof. It is built in two storeys to the west and three storeys to the east as a result of the sloping terrain. The roof is half hipped. The ground floor was originally used as a carriage house with room for four carriages while the low upper floor contained a corridor with 27 rooms for lackeys and other personnel. The upper floor was heightened when the building was converted to exclusively residential quarters at the beginning of the 19th century. The two gates in the western facade were also removed at this point.

The tunnel that links the Lakajgården site with the palace is barrel vaulted and has white-washed walls. It was renovated in 2012 after suffering from moisture problems for years.

== Today ==
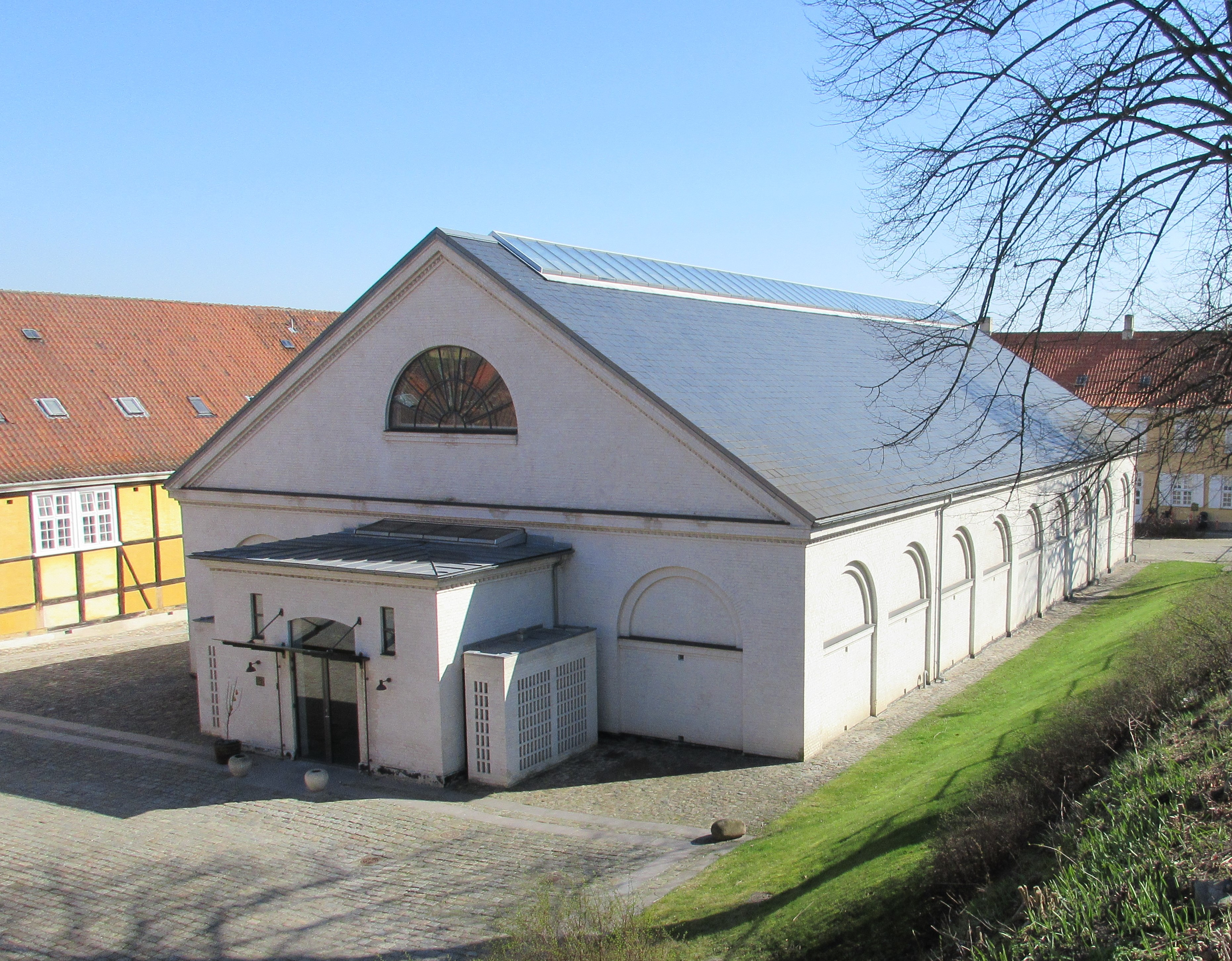
The former riding hall that was converted into an auditorium in 2007-09

The Laboratory Wing is now used as a fitness center. The western end of the Stables Wing is now used as a gym hall while the stables in the eastern end of the building remain intact but are no longer used for stabling of horses. The attic, formerly used for storing horse feed, has been converted into locker rooms. The Residential Wing (Lackey Building) contains six apartments. A gardens is located on the east side of the building.

The former Riding Hall was adapted for use as an auditorium and conference centre by E+N Arkitektur in 2007–09. The conversion received a diploma from Frederiksberg Municipality in 2009.
