= Listed buildings in Frederiksberg Municipality =

This list of listed buildings in Frederiksberg Municipality provides a list of listed buildings in Frederiksberg Municipality, Denmark.

== The list ==
Listing name	Image	Location	Coordinates	Description	
4. Maj Kollegiet		Frederiksberg Bredegade 13B, 2000 Frederiksberg	55°40′41.23″N 12°31′43.17″E	Three-winged hall of residence from 1941 designed by Hans Hansen	
Allégade 4		Allegade 4, 2000 Frederiksberg	55°40′30.93″N 12°31′58.39″E	Residential building with side wing from c. 1850	
Allégade 6 : Møllmanns Landsted		Allegade 6A, 2000 Frederiksberg	55°40′30.83″N 12°31′52.64″E	Two-storey residential building from 1794, part of the house row on Allégade, rebuilt in 1852	Ref
Allégade 6 : Møllmanns Landsted		Allegade 6D, 2000 Frederiksberg	55°40′30.83″N 12°31′52.64″E	One-storey, Baroque-style house with Mansard roof from 1753, probably designed by Philip de Lange and situated in the courtyard behind Allégade 6A	Ref
Allégade 8 A		Allegade 8A, 2000 Frederiksberg	55°40′32.58″N 12°31′59.14″E	Residential building from 1866 designed by J. E. Lampe	
Bakkehuset		Rahbeks Alle 23, 1801 Frederiksberg C	55°40′26.9″N 12°31′54.88″E	L-shaped building from c. 1764 possibly designed by Johan Christian Conradi with later alterations and memorial to Kamma and Knud Lyne Rahbek from 1833 designed by G. F. Hetsch and Hermann Ernst Freund	
Brøndsalen		Pile Alle 4, 2000 Frederiksberg	55°40′6.44″N 12°31′55.52″E	Building from c. 1880	
Det grønne Funkishus		Guldborgvej 25, 2000 Frederiksberg	55°41′11.26″N 12°31′37.89″E	Functionalist apartment building from 1932 designed by Hans Dahlerup-Berthelsen	
Det grønne Funkishus		Nordre Fasanvej 78, 2000 Frederiksberg	55°41′11.14″N 12°31′36.35″E	Functionalist apartment building from 1932 designed by Hans Dahlerup-Berthelsen and the front gardens with hedging	
Dronning Olgas Vej 17		Dronning Olgas Vej 17, 2000 Frederiksberg	55°41′16.69″N 12°32′15.55″E	House from 1887 designed by Niels Rasmussen and S. F. Schougaard and garage from 1911	
Dronning Olgas Vej 19		Dronning Olgas Vej 19, 2000 Frederiksberg	55°41′16.91″N 12°32′14.83″E	House from 1887 designed by Niels Rasmussen and S. F. Schougaard	
Duevej School		Duevej 63, 2000 Frederiksberg	55°41′28.07″N 12°31′42.89″E	Primary school from 1906 designed by Valdemar Schmidt: Main building, gymnastics hall, schoolmaster's house and schoolyard with associated walls	
Duevej School		Duevej 63, 2000 Frederiksberg	55°41′28.07″N 12°31′42.89″E	Primary school from 1906 designed by Valdemar Schmidt: Main building, gymnastics hall, schoolmaster's house and schoolyard with associated walls	
Duevej School		Duevej 63, 2000 Frederiksberg	55°41′28.07″N 12°31′42.89″E	Primary school from 1906 designed by Valdemar Schmidt: Main building, gymnastics hall, schoolmaster's house and schoolyard with associated walls	
Duevej School		Duevej 63, 2000 Frederiksberg	55°41′28.07″N 12°31′42.89″E	Primary school from 1906 designed by Valdemar Schmidt: Main building, gymnastics hall, schoolmaster's house and schoolyard with associated walls	
Frederiksberg Allé 104		Frederiksberg Alle 104, 1820 Frederiksberg C	55°40′29.79″N 12°31′58.43″E	Building from 1871 designed by Johan Schrøder	
Frederiksberg Åndsvageanstalt		Rahbeks Alle 21, 1801 Frederiksberg C	55°40′6.92″N 12°31′58.55″E	Former mental health institution from 1860 designed by Ferdinand Meldahl	
Frederiksberg Courthouse		Howitzvej 32, 2000 Frederiksberg	55°40′47.48″N 12°31′43.58″E	Courthouse from 1910–21 designed by Hack Kampmann and completed by Kaj Gottlob as well as the plaza in front of the building	
Frederiksberg Courthouse		Howitzvej 30, 2000 Frederiksberg	55°40′49.14″N 12°31′36.58″E	Part of the north colonnade and the whole of the south colonnade	
Frederiksberg Palace and Lakajgården		Roskildevej 28B, 2000 Frederiksberg	55°40′19.56″N 12°31′29.93″E	Frederiksberg Palace: Former royal summer residence originally built between 1699 and 1702 by Wilhelm Friedrich von Platen and Johan Conrad Ernst but greatly expanded and altered in 1708–09; the slightly lower wings flanking the courtyard from 1733–38 designed by Lauritz de Thurah; the gate house from 1704, probably designed by Johan Conrad Ernst, altered in 1829 by Jørgen Hansen Koch	
Frederiksberg Palace and Lakajgården		Roskildevej 26, 2000 Frederiksberg	55°40′16.97″N 12°31′35.11″E	Lakajgården: The west wing of a three-winged complex from the 1720s probably designed by Johan Conrad Ernst and their cobbled surroundings	
Frederiksberg Palace and Lakajgården		Roskildevej 26A, 2000 Frederiksberg	55°40′16.43″N 12°31′39.94″E	Lakajgården: The north wing of a three-winged complex from the 1720s probably designed by Johan Conrad Ernst and their cobbled surroundings	
Frederiksberg Palace and Lakajgården		Roskildevej 26, 2000 Frederiksberg	55°40′16.97″N 12°31′35.11″E	Lakajgården: The east wing of a three-winged complex from the 1720s probably designed by Johan Conrad Ernst and their cobbled surroundings	
Frederiksberg Park		Frederiksberg Runddel 1A, 2000 Frederiksberg	1663	Laurierhuset	Ref
Frederiksberg Park		Frederiksberg Runddel 3A, 2000 Frederiksberg	1744	Laurierhuset	Ref
Frederiksberg Park		Frederiksberg Runddel 1, 2000 Frederiksberg	1870	Chinese Tea House: Pavilion from 1799– built in Chinese style to designs by Andreas Kirkerup.	Ref
Frederiksberg Park		Frederiksberg Runddel 1, 2000 Frederiksberg	1802	Apis Temple: Roman-style "temple" pastiche from 1802 designed by Nicolai Abildgaard	Ref
Frederiksberg Park		Søndre Fasanvej 73, 2000 Frederiksberg	1724	The Pheasantry: Former pheasantry from 1723 designed by Johan Cornelius Krieger	Ref
Frederiksberg Park		Søndre Fasanvej 73, 2000 Frederiksberg	1724	The Pheasantry's Shed	Ref
Frederiksberg Park		Søndre Fasanvej 75, 2000 Frederiksberg	1801	Swiss Cottage: Thatched cottage from 1801 designed by Nicolai Abildgaard	Ref
Frederiksberg Rectoy		Pile Alle 1A, 2000 Frederiksberg	55°40′26.5″N 12°31′56.19″E	Rectory from 1825 with later extension	Ref
Frederiksberg Station		Solbjergvej 6, 2000 Frederiksberg	55°40′51.85″N 12°31′54.8″E	Station building from 1864 designed by V. C. H. Wolf	
Frederiksberg Station		Solbjergvej 8, 2000 Frederiksberg	55°40′51.85″N 12°31′53.36″E	Toilet and storage building with attached walls from 1870 designed by V. C. H. Wolf	
Frederiksberg Station		Solbjergvej 10, 2000 Frederiksberg	55°40′51.82″N 12°31′52.43″E	The station master's house from 1870 designed by V. C. H. Wolf	
H. C. Ørsteds Vej 54		H.C. Ørsteds Vej 54A, 1879 Frederiksberg C	55°40′58.79″N 12°33′2.35″E	Four-storey building with post office in the ground floor and apartments on the upper floors from 1939 designed by Edvard Thomsen and Christen Ostenfeld	
Hansen's Family Garden		Pile Alle 10, 2000 Frederiksberg	55°40′21.55″N 12°31′53.32″E	Half-timbered building from c. 1800	
Hassagers Kollegium		Frederiksberg Bredegade 13A, 2000 Frederiksberg	55°40′41.1″N 12°31′46.47″E	House from 1806 designed by J. Boye Junge	
Københavns Sygehjem		Rolighedsvej 23, 1958 Frederiksberg C	55°41′4.62″N 12°32′35.67″E	Hospital complex from 1857–59 by H. C. Stilling consisting of a main wing on Rolighedsvej and three lateral wings on its rear of which the central one is from 1877–78	
Lorry		Allegade 5, 2000 Frederiksberg	55°40′31.51″N 12°31′54.12″E	Riises Landsted: Neoclassical country house from 1860	
Lorry		Allegade 7, 2000 Frederiksberg	55°40′32.63″N 12°31′54.08″E	Building	
Lorry		Allegade 9, 2000 Frederiksberg	55°40′33.35″N 12°31′54.34″E	Building originally from the 18th century but greatly altered	
Lorry		Allegade 11, 2000 Frederiksberg	55°40′33.89″N 12°31′54.48″E	Building from 1881	
Ludvigs Minde		Allegade 22A, 2000 Frederiksberg	1790	Four-winged residential complex from 1790: The main wing	Ref
Ludvigs Minde		Allegade 22C, 2000 Frederiksberg	1790	Four-winged residential complex from 1790: The southern rear wing	Ref
Ludvigs Minde		Allegade 22F, 2000 Frederiksberg	1790	Four-winged residential complex from 1790: The central rear wing	Ref
Ludvigs Minde		Allegade 22G, 2000 Frederiksberg	1790	Four-winged residential complex from 1790: The northern rear wing	Ref
Materialgården		Frederiksberg Runddel 3D, 2000 Frederiksberg	55°40′30.83″N 12°31′52.64″E	South and east wing of three-winged complex from the late 18th century with later alterations, the cobbled courtyard and the wall along the north side of Ref	
Materialgården		Frederiksberg Runddel 3D, 2000 Frederiksberg	55°40′30.83″N 12°31′52.64″E	West wing of three-winged complex from the late 18th century with later alterations, the cobbled courtyard and the wall along the north side of Ref	
Møstings Hus		Andebakkesti 5, 2000 Frederiksberg	55°40′42.25″N 12°31′39.7″E	House from 1801, moved to the current site in 1977	Ref
Målerhuset		Dirch Passers Allé 802, 2000 Frederiksberg		House from 1895	Ref
P. Andersen's Watertower		P. Andersens Vej 17, 2000 Frederiksberg	55°40′54.32″N 12°31′27.97″E	Water tower from 1877 designed by Vilhelm Tvede	Ref
Pile Allé 2		Pile Alle 2, 2000 Frederiksberg	55°40′28.1″N 12°31′55.4″E	Corner building from 1863 with later alterations and wall along the south side of Frederiksberg Runddel	Ref
Pile Allé 6–8		Pile Alle 6, 2000 Frederiksberg	55°40′22.73″N 12°31′53.12″E	Half-timbered house from c. 1800	Ref
Rolighed		Rolighedsvej 21, 1958 Frederiksberg C	55°41′6.35″N 12°32′31.26″E	Main building from	
Rolighed		Rolighedsvej 21, 1958 Frederiksberg C	55°41′6.35″N 12°32′31.26″E	Intermediate building to the west of the courtyard	
Rolighed		Rolighedsvej 21A, 1958 Frederiksberg C	55°41′6.35″N 12°32′31.26″E	Two-winged building to the northwest of the courtyard	
Rolighed		Rolighedsvej 21D, 1958 Frederiksberg C	55°41′6.35″N 12°32′31.26″E	Untermediate building to the southwest of the courtyard	
Rolighed		Rolighedsvej 21E, 1958 Frederiksberg C	55°41′6.35″N 12°32′31.26″E	Untermediate building to the east of the courtyard	
Rolighed		Rolighedsvej 21G, 1958 Frederiksberg C	55°41′6.35″N 12°32′31.26″E	Untermediate building to the east of the southeast of the courtyard	
Rolighed		Rolighedsvej 21H, 1958 Frederiksberg C	55°41′6.35″N 12°32′31.26″E	Untermediate building to the east of the northeast of the courtyard	
Royal Veterinary and Agricultural University		Bülowsvej 17, 1870 Frederiksberg C	1858/95	The original three-winged main building (with the pergola) from 1856–58 designed by Gottlieb Bindesbøll, the fourth wing on Bülowsvej from 1895 designed by Johannes Emil Gnudtzmann and the central courtyard	Ref
Royal Veterinary and Agricultural University		Grønnegårdsvej 8, 1870 Frederiksberg C	1858	Detached wing from 1856–58 designed by Gottlieb Bindesbøll	Ref
Royal Veterinary and Agricultural University		Grønnegårdsvej 10, 1870 Frederiksberg C	1858	Detached wing from 1856–58 designed by Gottlieb Bindesbøll	Ref
Royal Porcelain Factory: Director's House		Porcelænshaven 7, 2000 Frederiksberg	55°40′39.39″N 12°31′26.33″E	House from 1905 designed by Anton Rosen	Ref
Schønbergsgade 15		Schønbergsgade 15, 1906 Frederiksberg C	55°40′32.53″N 12°33′6.24″E	Apartment building from 1857 designed by H. C. Stilling	Ref
Søndermarken: Norwegian Cottage		Roskildevej 25, 2000 Frederiksberg	55°40′13.42″N 12°31′36.58″E	Log cabin from 1787	
Store Godthab		Godthåbsvej 79B, 2000 Frederiksberg	c. 1770	Former country house from c. 1770 with courtyard	Ref
Store Godthab		Godthåbsvej 79A, 2000 Frederiksberg	c. 1850	Barn from c. 1850	Ref
Store Godthab		Godthåbsvej 79A, 2000 Frederiksberg	1792	Gardener's house from 1792	Ref
Vodroffsvej 2 A–B		Vodroffsvej 2A, 1900 Frederiksberg C	55°40′27.36″N 12°33′18.71″E	V-shaped, functionalist apartment building in five and six storeys from 1930 designed by Kay Fisker and C. F. Møller	Ref
Vodroffsvej 8		Vodroffsvej 8, 1900 Frederiksberg C	1865	House from 1865 designed by J. W. Frohne	Ref
Vodroffsvej 10		Vodroffsvej 10, 1900 Frederiksberg C	1865	House from 1865 designed by J. W. Frohne	Ref
Vodroffsvej 10		Vodroffsvej 10, 1900 Frederiksberg C	1882	Studio building from 1882 designed by Johan Schrøder	Ref
Vordroffsvej 31: Gymnastikhuset		Vodroffsvej 51, 1900 Frederiksberg C	55°41′28.05″N 12°31′42.88″E	L-shaped corner building from 1898 designed by Peder Vilhelm Jensen-Klint, including the bicycle shed, the courtyard and the entrance gate	
