= Ludvigs Minde =

Listed building in Frederiksberg, Denmark

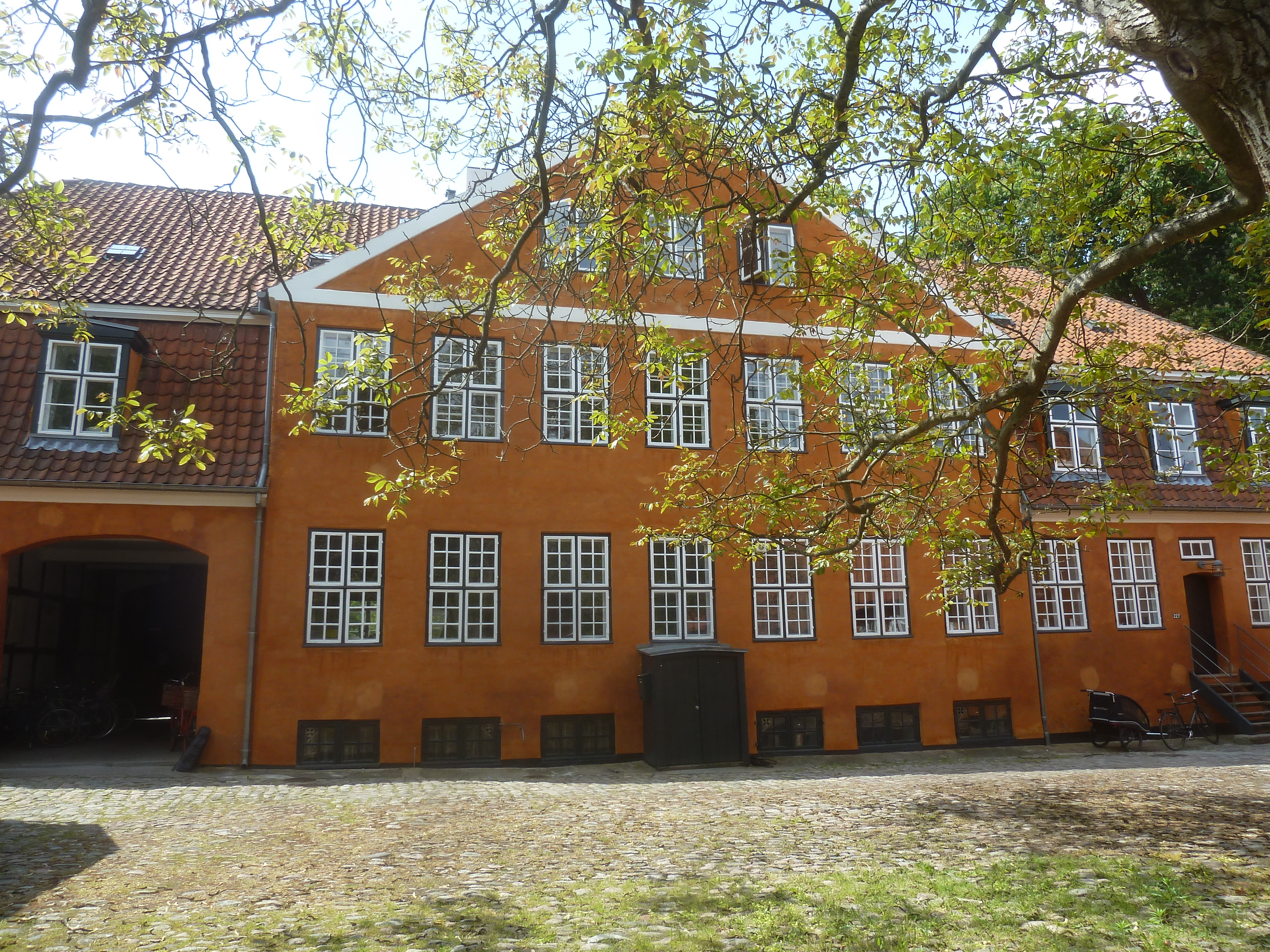
- Ludvigs Minde viewed from the garden.
- Interactive map of the Ludvigs Minde area

General information
- Location: Frederiksberg, Copenhagen, Allégade 22, 2000 Frederiksberg, Denmark
- Coordinates: 55°40′37.31″N 12°32′1.46″E
- Completed: 1770

Ludvigs Minde is a historic house situated on Allégade (No. 22), close to Frederiksberg Town Hall, in Frederiksberg, Copenhagen, Denmark. The building was listed on the Danish registry of protected buildings and places in 1918. Constructed in 1770, it is the oldest of the heritage-listed buildings that line the eastern side of Allégade.

== History ==
=== Johan Jørgen Berner ===
The building was constructed by surveyor Johan Jørgen Berner in 1770. In 1767, he had become one of the first two state-employed land surveyors in the country (the other was Christian Westenholdt). In 1777, he became responsible for supervising the work of the other land surveyors, with the title of chief land surveyor.

In early 1769, Berner bought the first of two properties at the site. Since 1751, it had been the site of a textile manufactory, "Den Dannebergske Klædefabrik"), started by Johan Danneberg and later continued by his son Frederik Danneberg. Due to the son's bankruptcy, it was now sold by forced auction. Berner paid 2050 Danish rigsdaler for the property. In December of the same year, Berner also bought the neighboring property to the north, from Mathias Hulegaard, for 2700 rigsdaler. Gulegaard had also managed Bakkehuset on behalf of Johan Christian Conradi. The two estates had a combined area of just over 90 tønder land. Berner merged the two farms into a single property, demolished the existing buildings and embarked on the construction of two new houses. On their completion, he moved into the southern house (now Ludvigs Minde). Part of the building complex was let out to well-to-do citizens from Copenhagen in the summer time. The northern house (now demolished) was more simple than the southern one.

Berner's neighbour to the north was one of his friends, Johan Andreas Winckler, a gardener, who was married to a relative of his wife. Two of their other friends were Frantz Hunæis, Frederiksberg's physician, and Joachim Conrad Oehlenschläger, Adam Oehlenschläger's father, who served as steward of Frederiksberg Palace. Adam described the entourage and the social life that surrounded the building in his memoirs. Hunæus referred to Berner as "The Admiral" and the others as captains. Correspondingly, Berner's house was referred to as "The Admiral Ship", while the others' houses were referred to as frigates.

Berner died in 1794. His widow stayed in the house for years.

=== Frantz Hunæus ===
In 1803, Berner's widow sold the property to Frantz Hunæus for 18,000 rigsdaler. As part of the arrangement, she got an apartment in the southern building for the rest of her life. Hunæus was born at Frederiksberg as the son of the local sognefoged. He later served as a ship surgeon in the navy, and then as garrison surgeon in the Danish West Indies, before returning home to open a medical clinic in his home town.

Hunæus continued his old friend's practice of letting rooms out to summer guests from Copenhagen. His guests included Anders Sandøe Ørsted and his wife Sofie Ørsted, as well as Niels Treschow. The latter's third wife was the sister of numismatist Ole Devegge, who also frequented the premises.

=== Changing owners, 1809–1861 ===
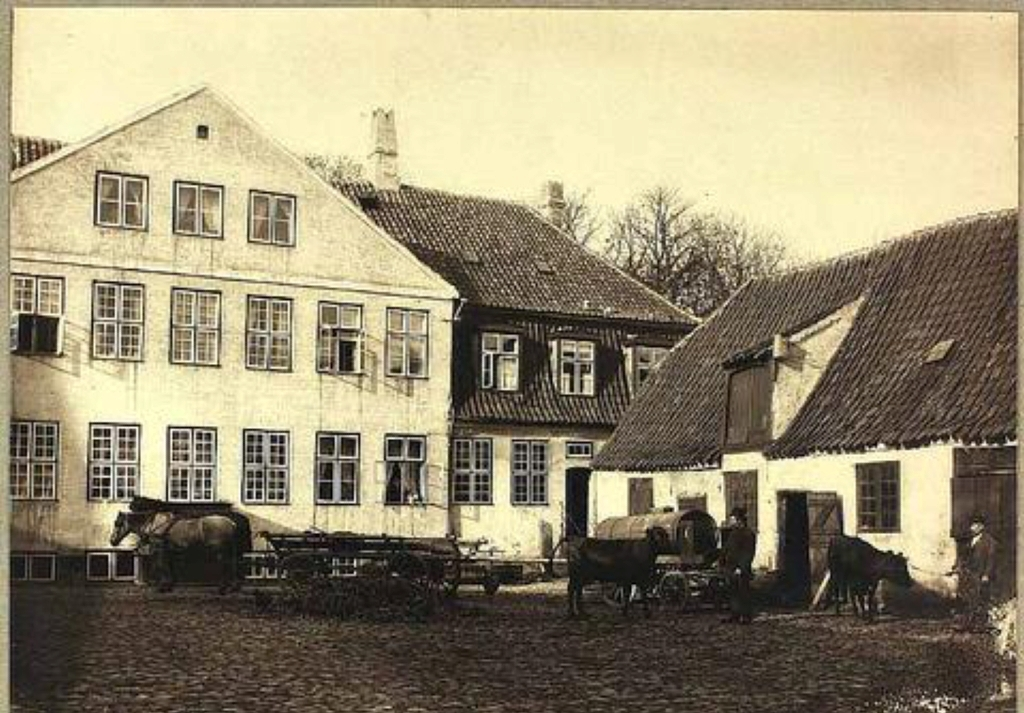
Ludvigs Minde viewed from the courtyard

In 1808, shortly before to his death, Hunæus sold the property for 27,000 rigsdaler to sugar manufacturer Christian Frederik Fiedler. In the same year, Fiedler bought Basnæs Manor on the southern part of Zealand. In July 1809, he sold the two houses on Allégade to artillery captain Johan (Hans) Frederik Uldall (1775–1836), but kept much of the attached land (the Godthåb and Forhåbningsholm lots). As a replacement, Yldall bought another farm, Teglgården, making him one of the largest landowners in Frederiksberg. In 1836, Uldall sold Berner's old property to the farmer Johan Rasmussen.

=== Reeberg family ===
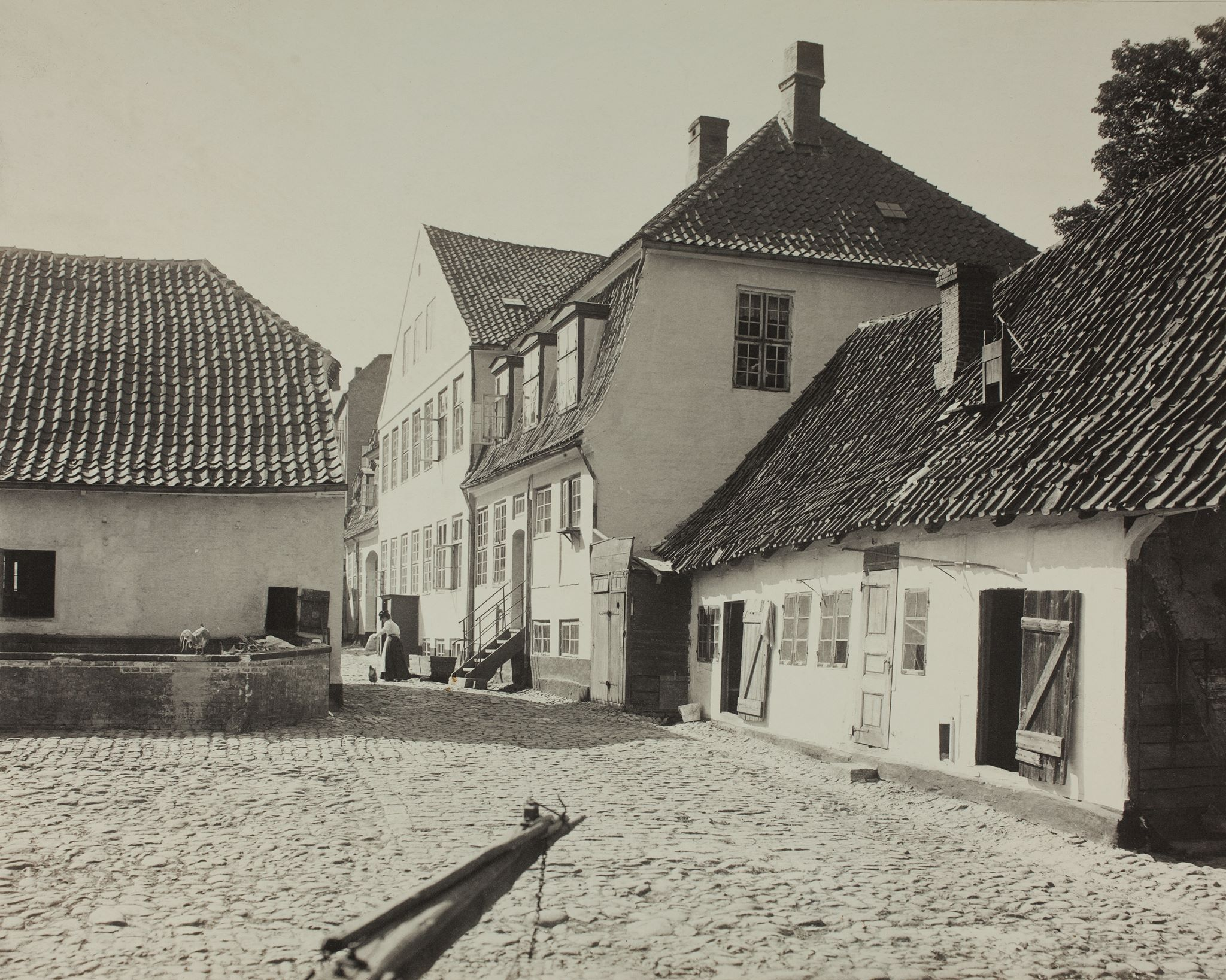
Ludvigs Minde in 1899

In 1861, Rasmussen ceded the property to his son-in-law Nicolai Bredahl Reeberg. After his death, it was passed to his two sons Ludvig Ernst Reeberg (1847–1912) and Alfred Theodor Reeberg (1850–). In 10+4, Ludvig Ernst Reeberg became the sole owner of the property. He endowed the estate to Brødrene Reebergs Legat for bankrupt estate owners. In 1913, when the grant inherited the building, it gave it the name Ludvigs Minde in remembrance of its founder.
