= Chinese Tea House (Frederiksberg) =

Listed building in Frederiksberg, Denmark

The Chinese Tea House
- Det kinesiske lysthus
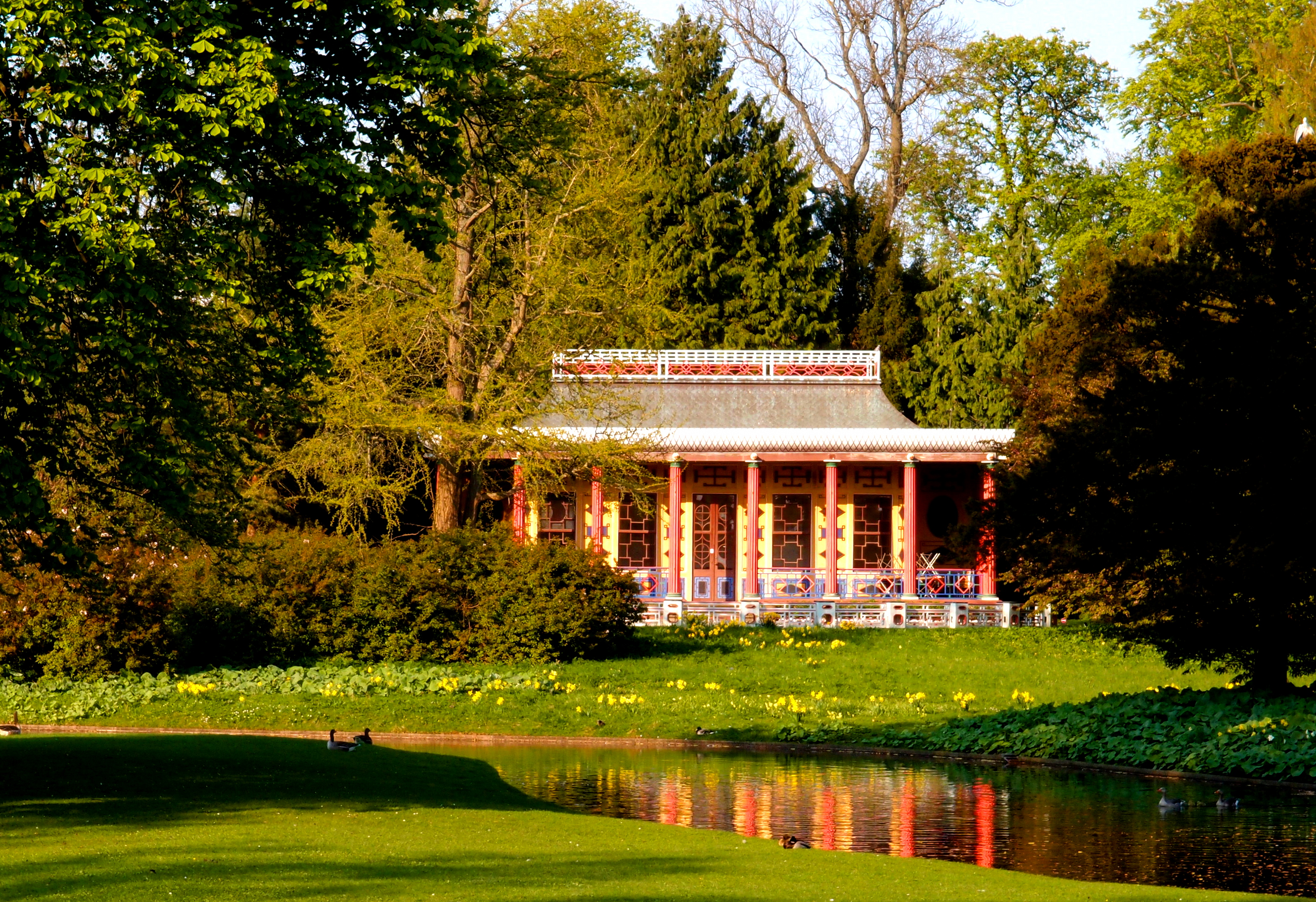
- Interactive map of the The Chinese Tea House area

General information
- Location: Frederiksberg, Copenhagen, Denmark
- Coordinates: 55°40′31.94″N 12°31′39.07″E
- Construction started: 1799
- Completed: 1801

Design and construction
- Architect: Andreas Kirkerup

The Chinese Tea House is a Chinese-inspired pavilion in Frederiksberg Gardens, Copenhagen, Denmark. The building was constructed in 1800–01 to designs by court carpenter Andreas Kirkerup. It stands on a small artificial island which can be reached by way of a matching Chinese style bridge. It was listed on the Danish register of protected buildings and places in 1973.

== History ==
The park of Frederiksberg Palace was originally laid out in the Baroque style. In the 1790s, as fashion changed, the park was adapted into an English landscape garden. P. Petersen created a new garden plan in 1795. He created a typical English-style landscape garden with winding lawns, lakes, canals and spinneys as well as grottos, temples, pavilions and summerhouses. The final result may well have been based on Johan Ludwig Mansa's book on English-style gardening written in 1798.

Andreas Kirkerup was charged with designing a "Chinese" tea house for one of the four artificial islands. The Chinese Tea House was a request from Crown Prince Christian. Kirkerup had already designed Chinese-style pavilions for a number of other parks, including Liselund on Møn, Dronninggård at Søllerød and Classen's Garden (Classens Have) in Østerbro outside Copenhagen. The one at Liselund was created for Antoine de Bosc de la Calmette. The design seems to have been based on some of Calmette's own drawings from a journey to Germany. Especially a drawing of the Chinese House in Potsdam seems to have served as inspiration. In 1798, Calmette went on another journey abroad. One of Calmette's drawings from this later journey seems to have served as inspiration for Kirkerup's design of the Chinese Tea House in Frederiksberg Gardens. Another source of inspiration was William Chambers book on Chinese architecture.

The construction was overseen by Nicolai Abildgaard. He requested a number of modifications. He was also responsible for choosing the colours and most of the interior decorations.

In 1803, it was necessary to repair the building due to Subsidence. The building was refurbished in the 1840s, 1890 and 1982–90.

== Art and furnishings ==
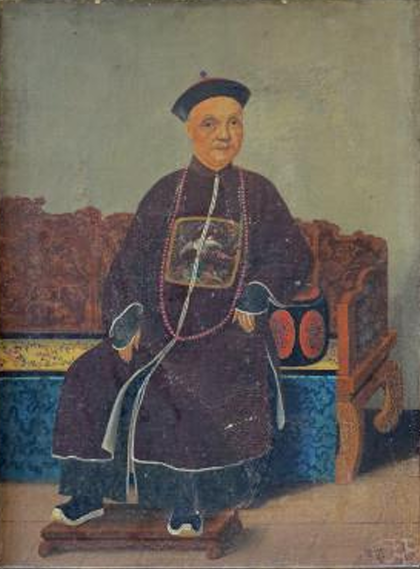
Portrait painting of Quionqua.

The Chinese Tea House contained a hall, two cabinets, a kitchen and lavatory. The only window in the lavatory was in the shape of a half moon and was made of red glass. The furniture consisted partly of copies of Chinese furniture as well as a set of genuine Chinese bamboo furniture acquired through the Asiatic Company.

A copy of a portrait painting of the Chinese merchant Quionqua was for many years on display in the building. The original painting was a gift to supercargo Pierre Mourier. Mourier's son Charles had the painting copied and presented the copy to the king as a gift.

== Gallery ==
=== Andreas Kirkerup's sketches ===
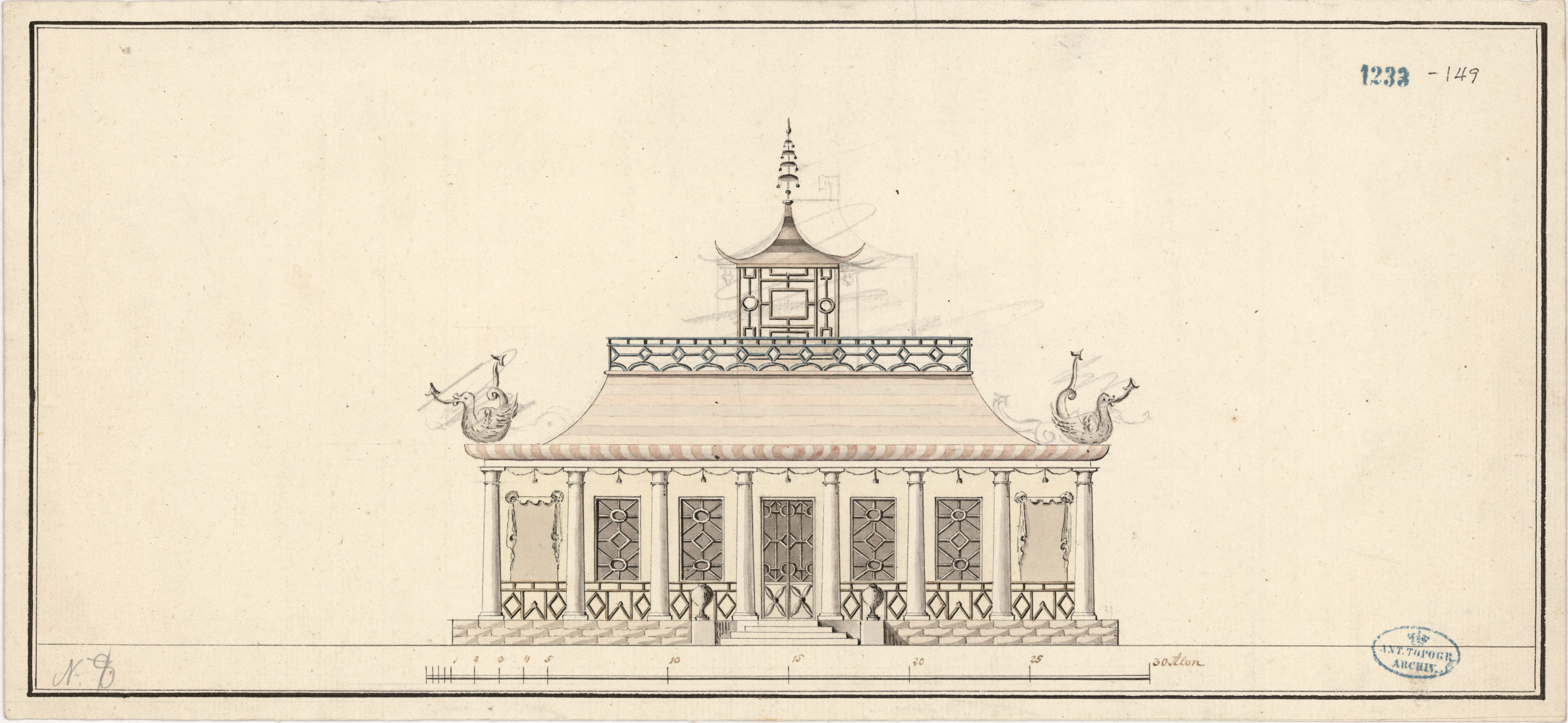
One of Kirkerup's sketches.

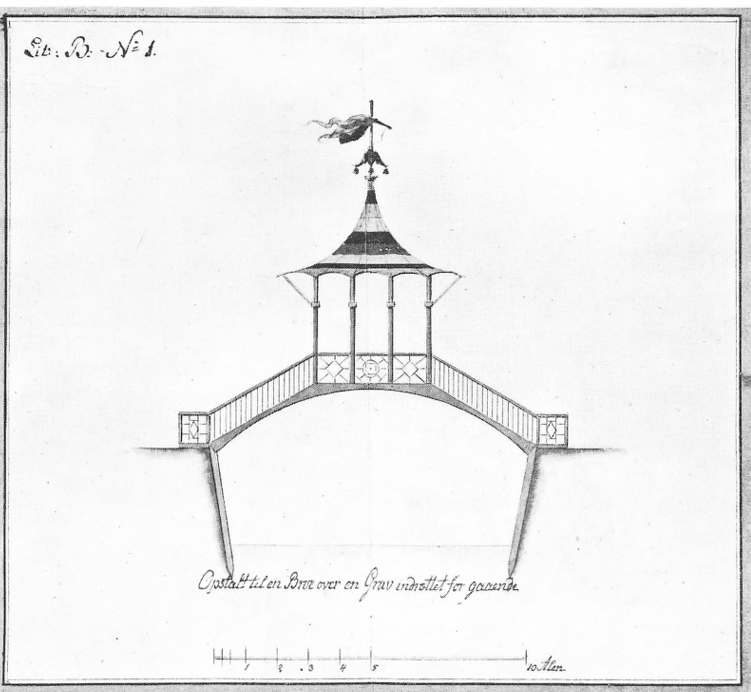

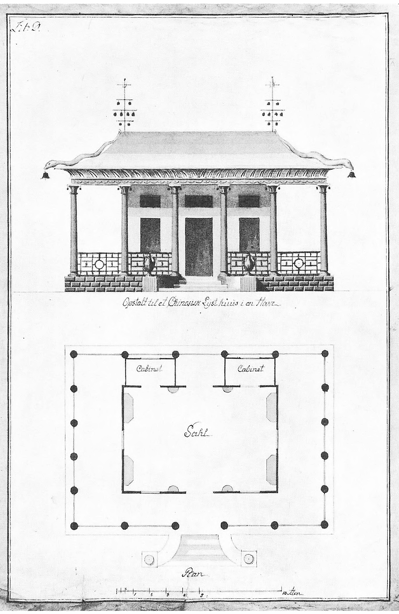

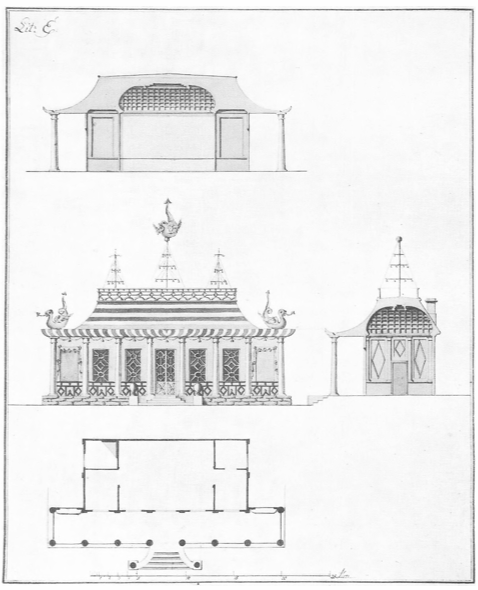

=== Other depictions ===
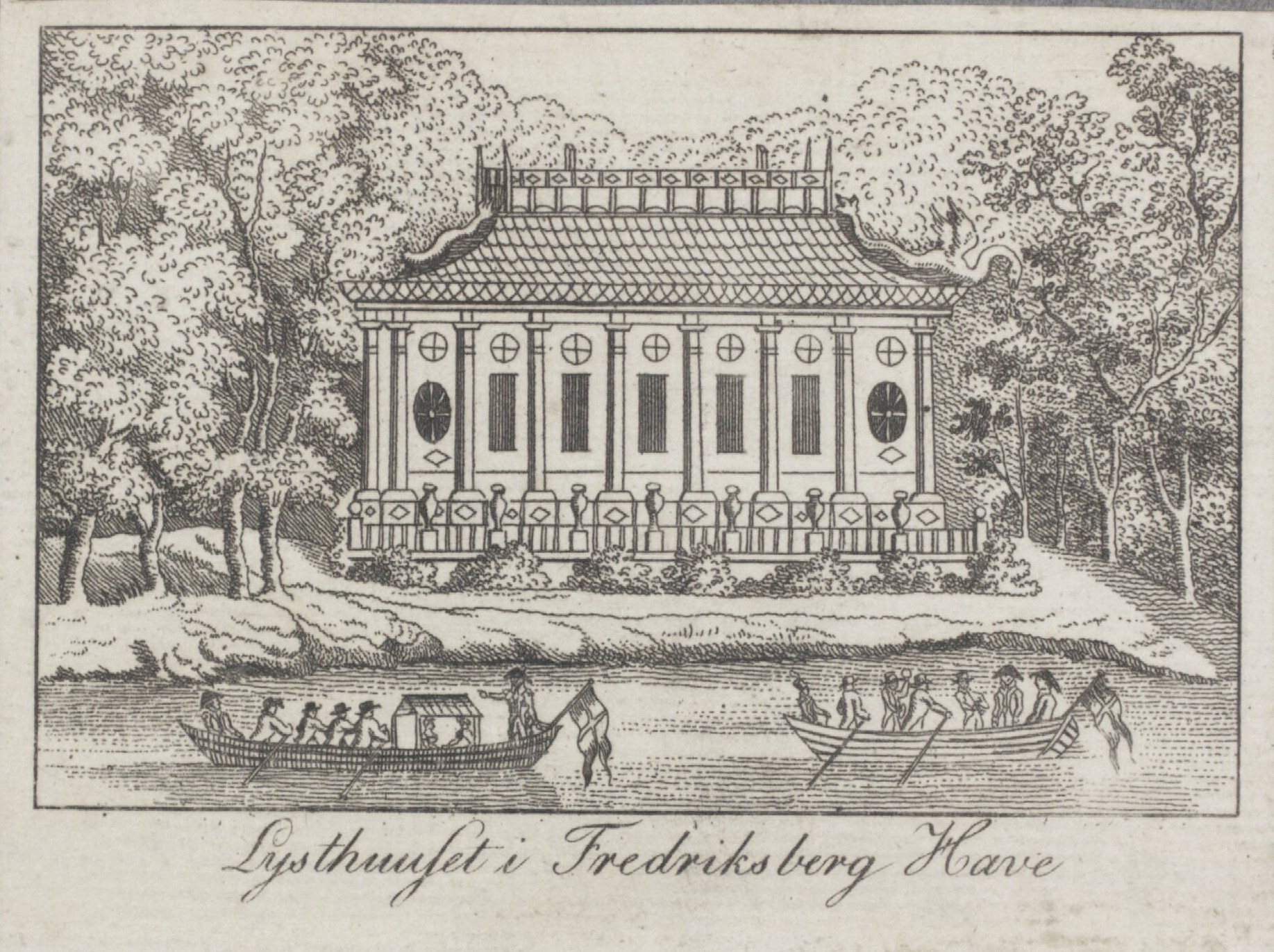

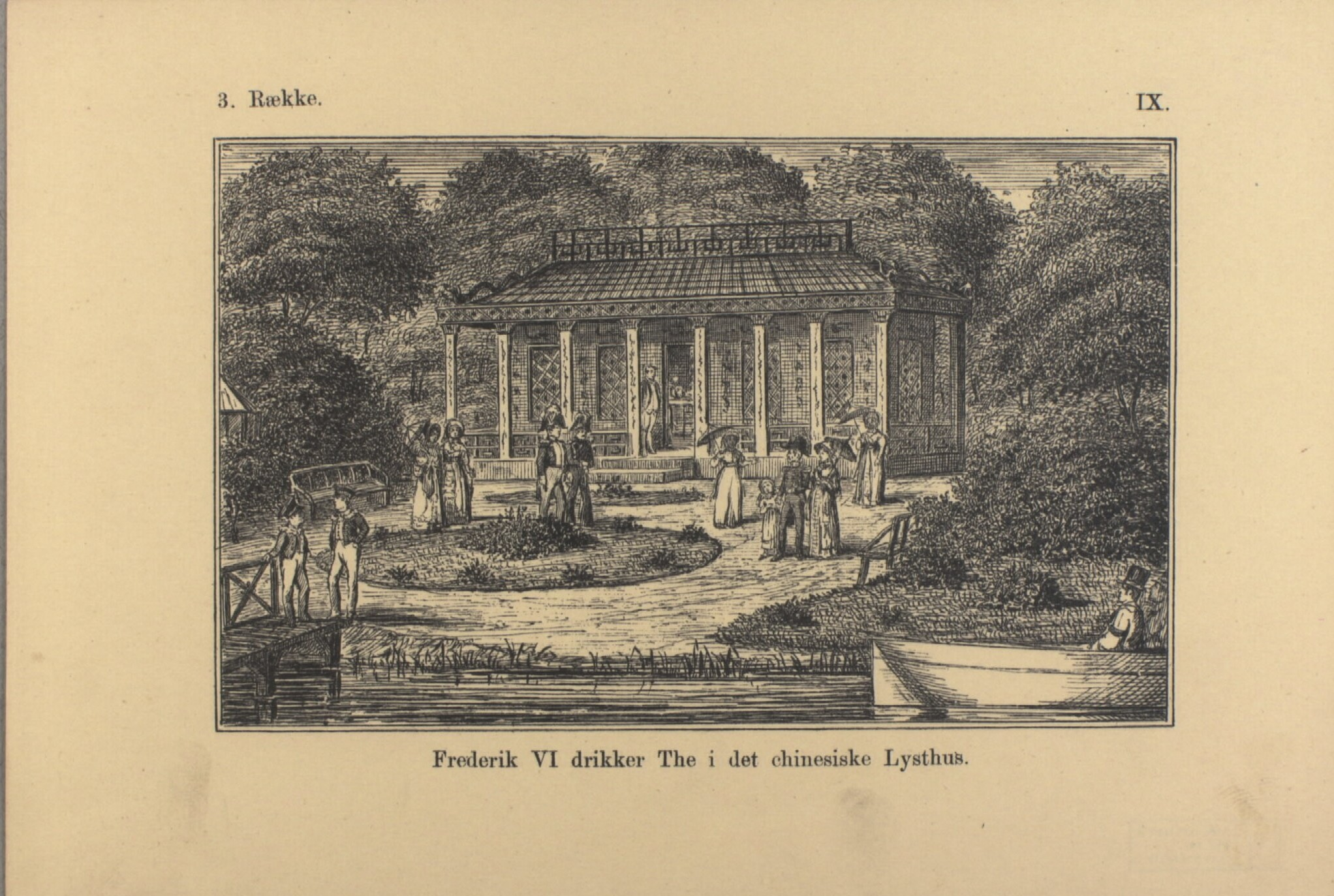

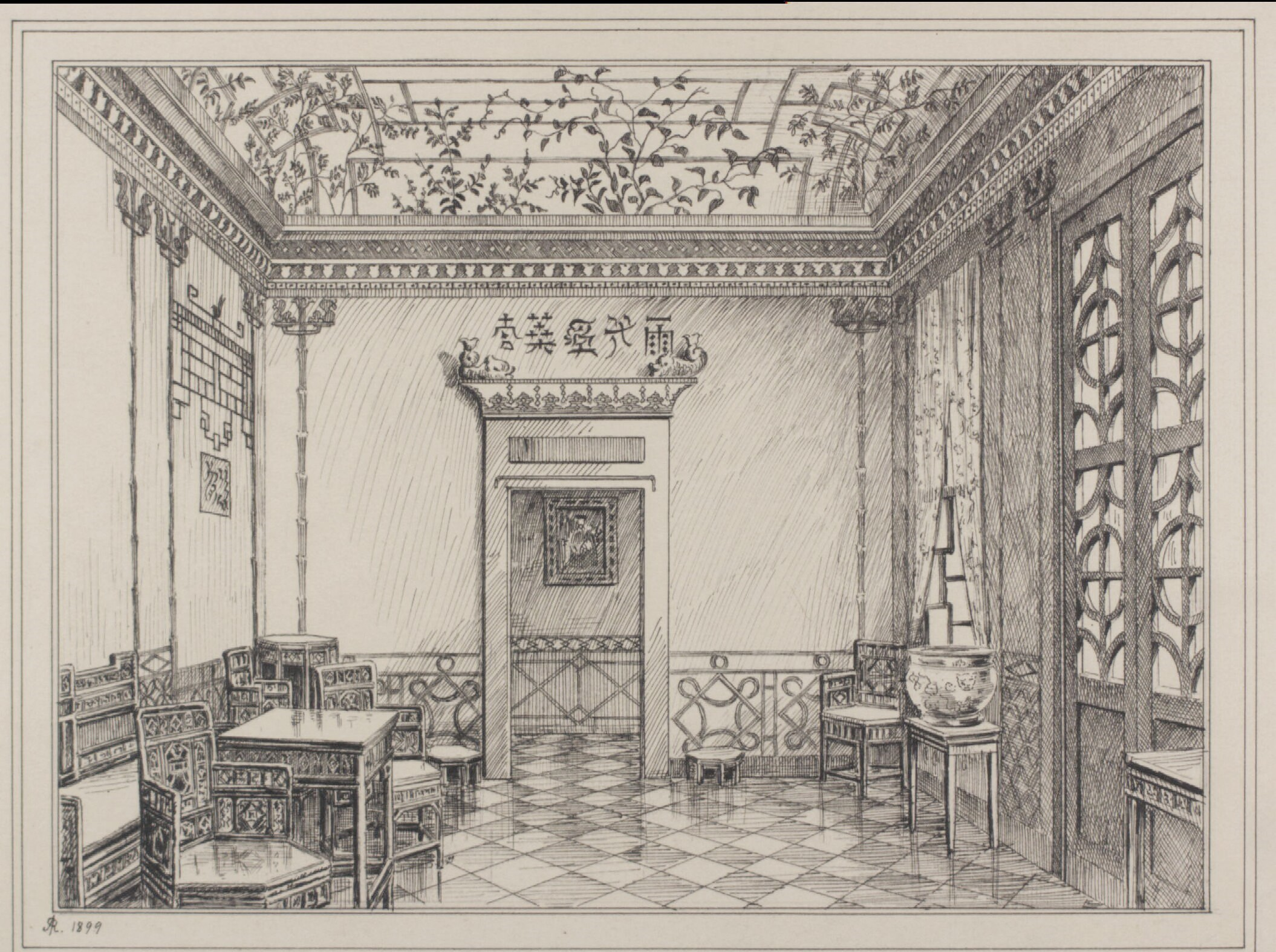
Drawing of the interior from 1899.
