= Frederiksberg Town Hall =

Town hall in Copenhagen, Denmark

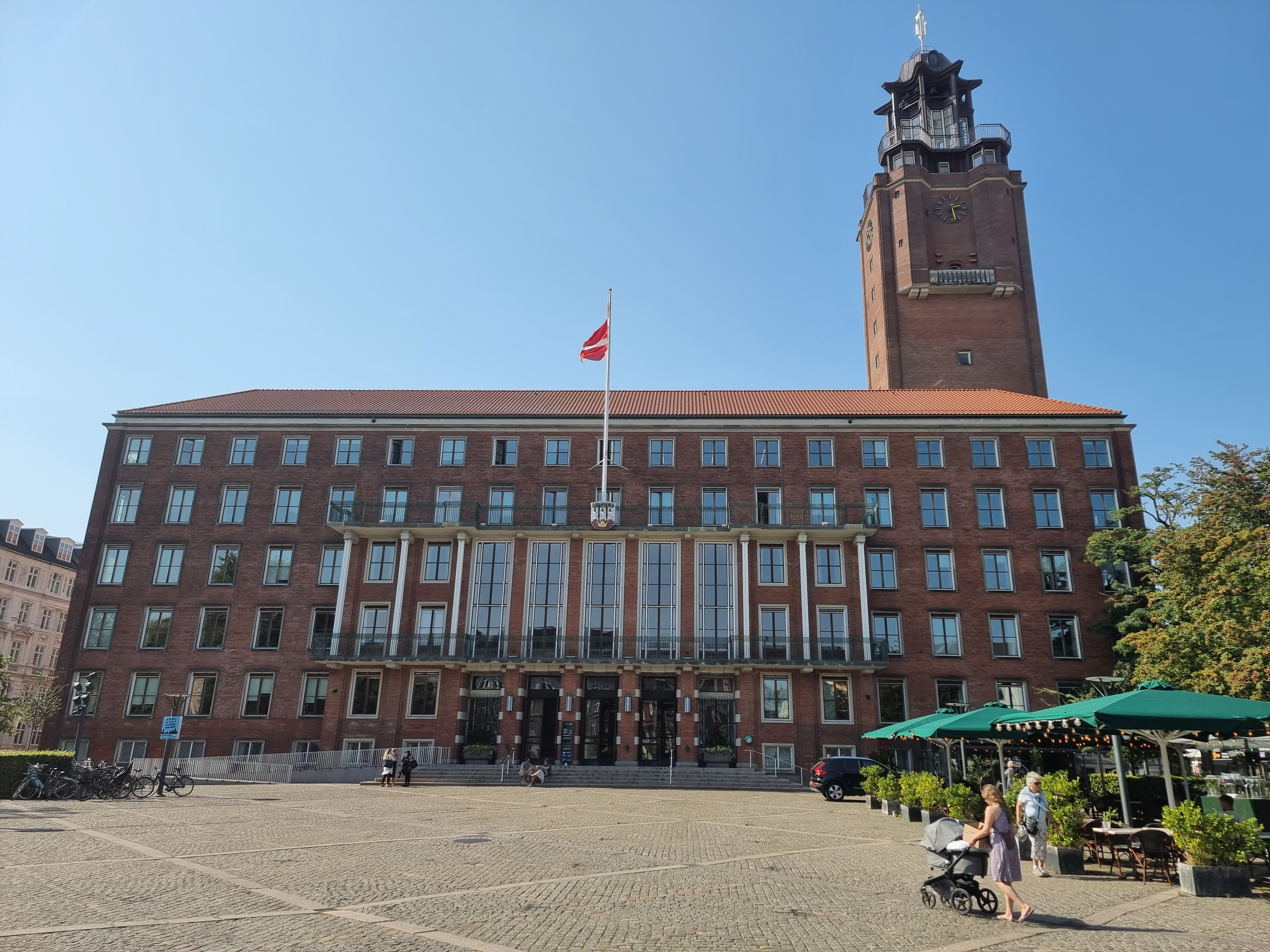
- Frederiksberg City Hall in 2024

- Location within Copenhagen

General information
- Location: Frederiksberg, Denmark
- Coordinates: 55°40′41.45″N 12°31′53.61″E
- Construction started: 1942
- Completed: 1953

Design and construction
- Architect: Henning Hansen

Frederiksberg Town Hall (Danish: Frederiksberg Rådhus) is the administrative center of Frederiksberg Municipality, an independent municipality located in inner Copenhagen, Denmark.

== History ==
Before 1852, Frederiksberg was a rural community with a population of about 3000 and was thus lacking in major administration facilities. In 1852, nearby Copenhagen lifted regulations, restricting construction outside the city's ramparts. This led to massive growth in urban development for the surrounding areas, resulting in Frederiksberg becoming an independent municipality in 1858.

In the early days, the municipal council met in a room in the back of the Poorhouse on Allégade 14. Eventually, in 1863, the council staff relocated to a newly completed poorhouse and hospital on Lampevej (now Howitzvej) street.

The municipal council remained on Lampevej until 1870 when they had to seek other accommodation due to the expanding needs of the poorhouse they had been occupying. Due to this, the council staff rented Smallegade no. 1 for four years, until 1874, when the School on Lampevej was completed. Several of the school's classrooms were used by the municipal council and repurposed into a meeting room, committee rooms, and office space for the municipal administration. This arrangement, while a significant improvement over the previous accommodations, would still prove insufficient for the needs of the rapidly growing Frederiksberg.

By 1886, the school rooms used by the municipal council proved too small for their needs. Fortunately, as the fire department was looking to relocate from its current joint police and fire station located on Pile Allé, it was decided that in connection with the new fire station, a dedicated administration building would be built on the corner of Howitzvej and Falkonér Allé.

This new building was constructed in a Neo-gothic style, in order to fit in with the structures surrounding it. It housed the fire department as well as a courthouse and office space for Birket and the local municipal government of Frederiksberg, which had a population of 75,000 by the year 1900.

As the population continued to grow during the first part of the 20th century, the old building became increasingly insufficient for the requirements of the now much bigger administration. At around the turn of the century, the municipal administration was subdivided into independent administrations, such as the Treasury and Accounting, Tax Administration, Housing and Property, Engineering, Building Inspectorate, City Planning, and the Welfare and Social Office departments. This allowed the Welfare and Hospital Service were able to move to the newly built hospital on Nordre Fasanvej in 1903. Despite this, the Building situated between Howitzvej and Falkonér Allé was still too cramped, proven by proposals from the municipal government in 1896 and 1907 for a new municipal building. Eventually, Birket and the fire station both relocated in 1921 and 1932 respectively, yet the building was still too cramped for the ever-increasing needs of the local government. This led to the municipal council needing to rent numerous premises around the city to cope with the increased workload.

In 1936, an architectural competition was announced to construct an entirely new city hall. The winner was Henning Hansen, who presented a five-story complex to replace the now old and cramped municipal building. Despite being the winner of the competition, this project was ultimately never realized.

Eventually, the municipality's architectural department presented its plans regarding an eventual new administration building in 1941. However, when their work was deemed unsatisfactory, Henning Hansen was once again asked to design a building for a new town hall, but this time with a plot of land between Bredegade and Smallegade - which was used by the rejected architectural department project.

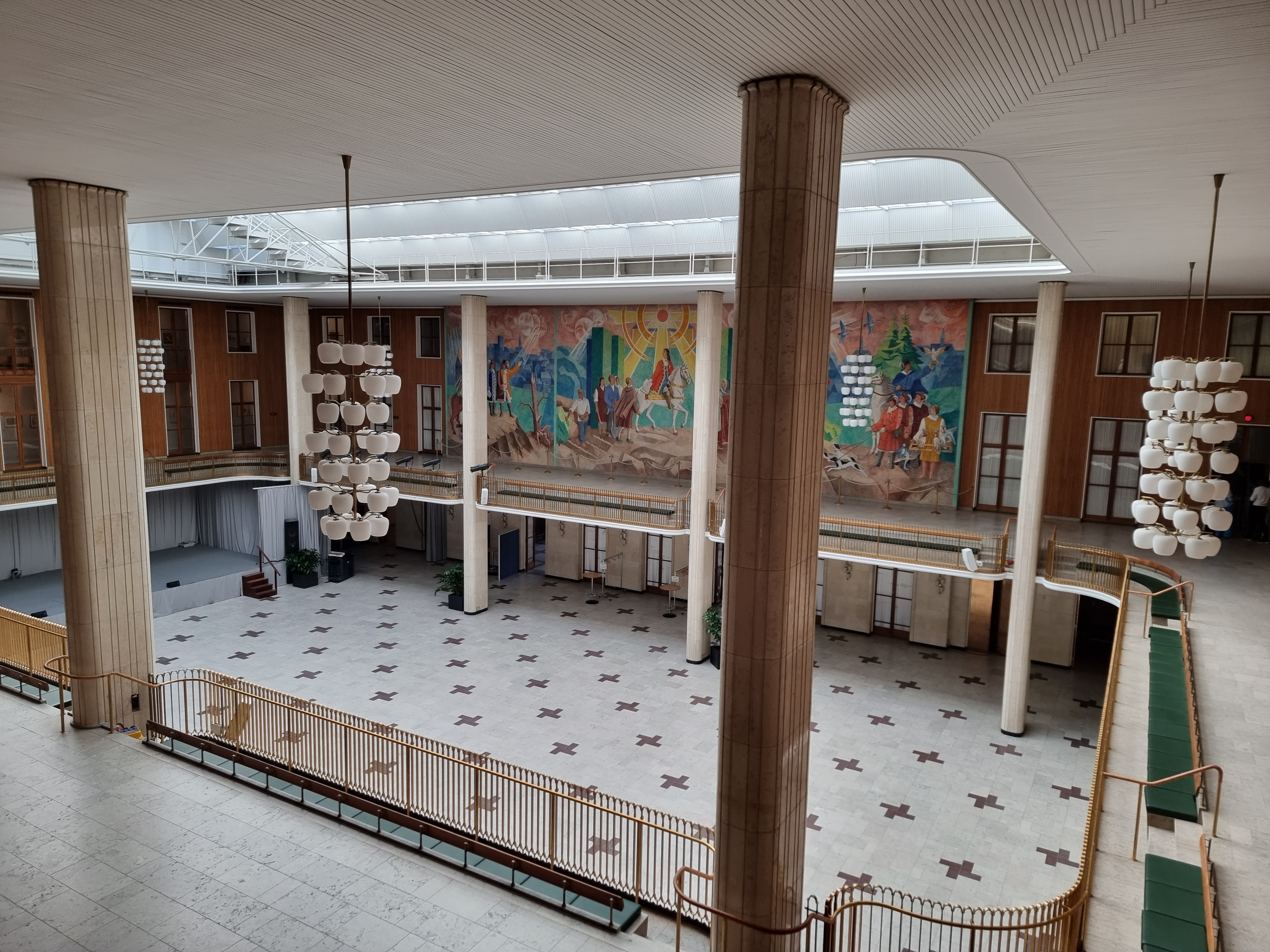
_{“Frederik den III overdrager ladegårdsjorden til bønder fra Amager”} as seen from the second floor of the building.

Work on the new City Hall started in 1942, with the plot of land being cleared and the foundations for the new building being laid. However, due to a shortage of materials across Denmark during the later years of the German occupation of the country, the project stalled, with virtually no work being done on the building from 1944 up to 1949.

After Henning Hansen died in 1945, Carl H. Nimb and Helge Holm took over responsibility for completing the building. The new Town Hall was eventually inaugurated on the 9th of May, 1953.

On the same year that the Town Hall was officially opened, the painting “Frederik den III overdrager ladegårdsjorden til bønder fra Amager” ("Frederik III Hands Over the Farmstead Land to Farmers from Amager") by Jais Nielsen was painted.

== Architecture ==
The building is 60 meters wide and 120 meters long, with the tower rising to 70 m above the street level.

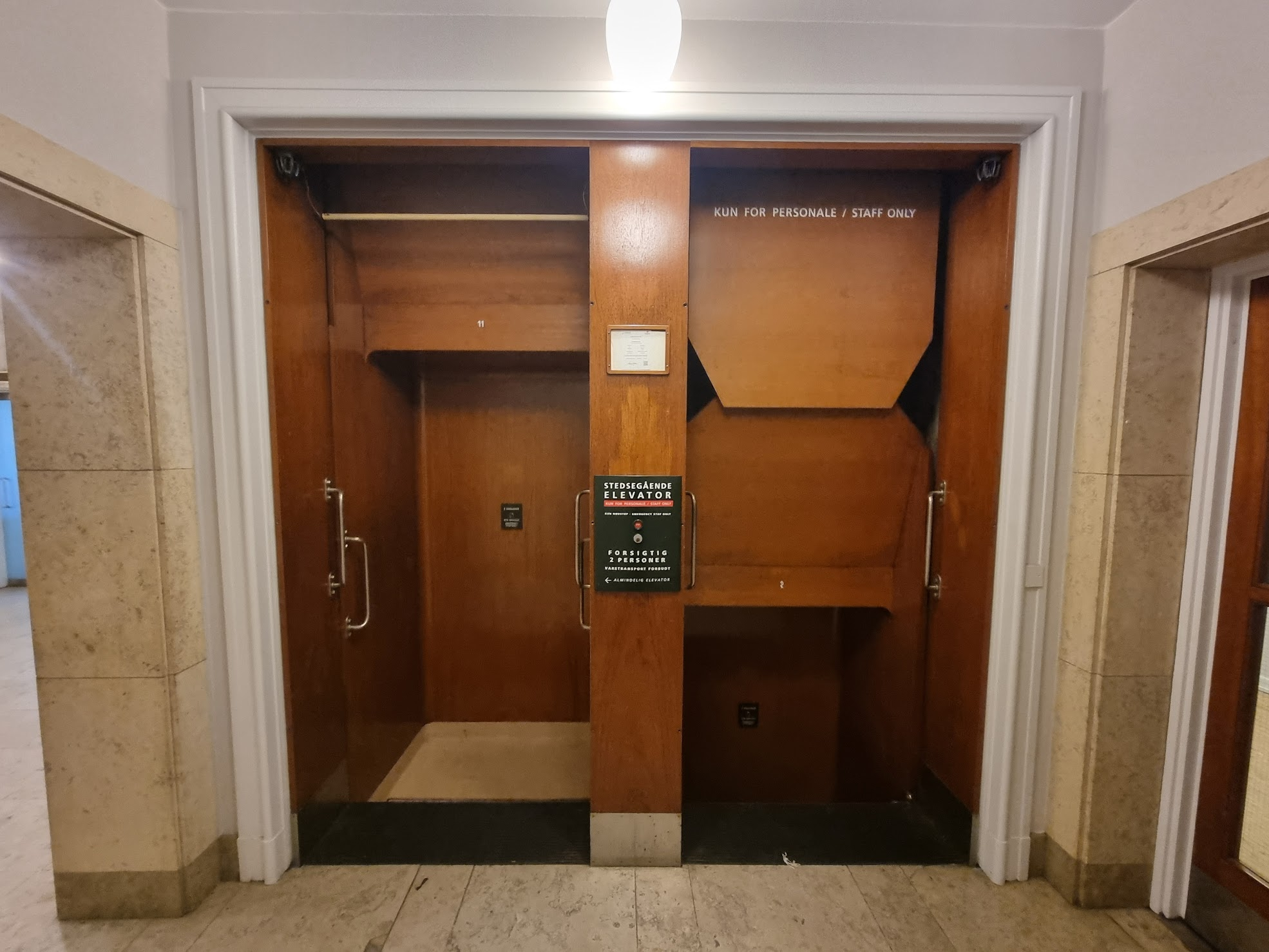
The Paternoster lift inside the Town Hall

The building, in addition to offices, contains the Town Hall auditorium, grand ceremonial hall, Wedding Room, and an assembly hall used by the city council. The municipal archives are located in the basement.

Notably, the Frederiksberg Town Hall also has a Paternoster elevator within it. That type of passenger lift has been stopped from production since the 1970s, and has seen scarce use due to concerns about passenger safety due to its continuous mode of operation. As a consequence, the Paternoster lift in the building is reserved for personnel of the Town Hall itself.

== Town Hall Square ==
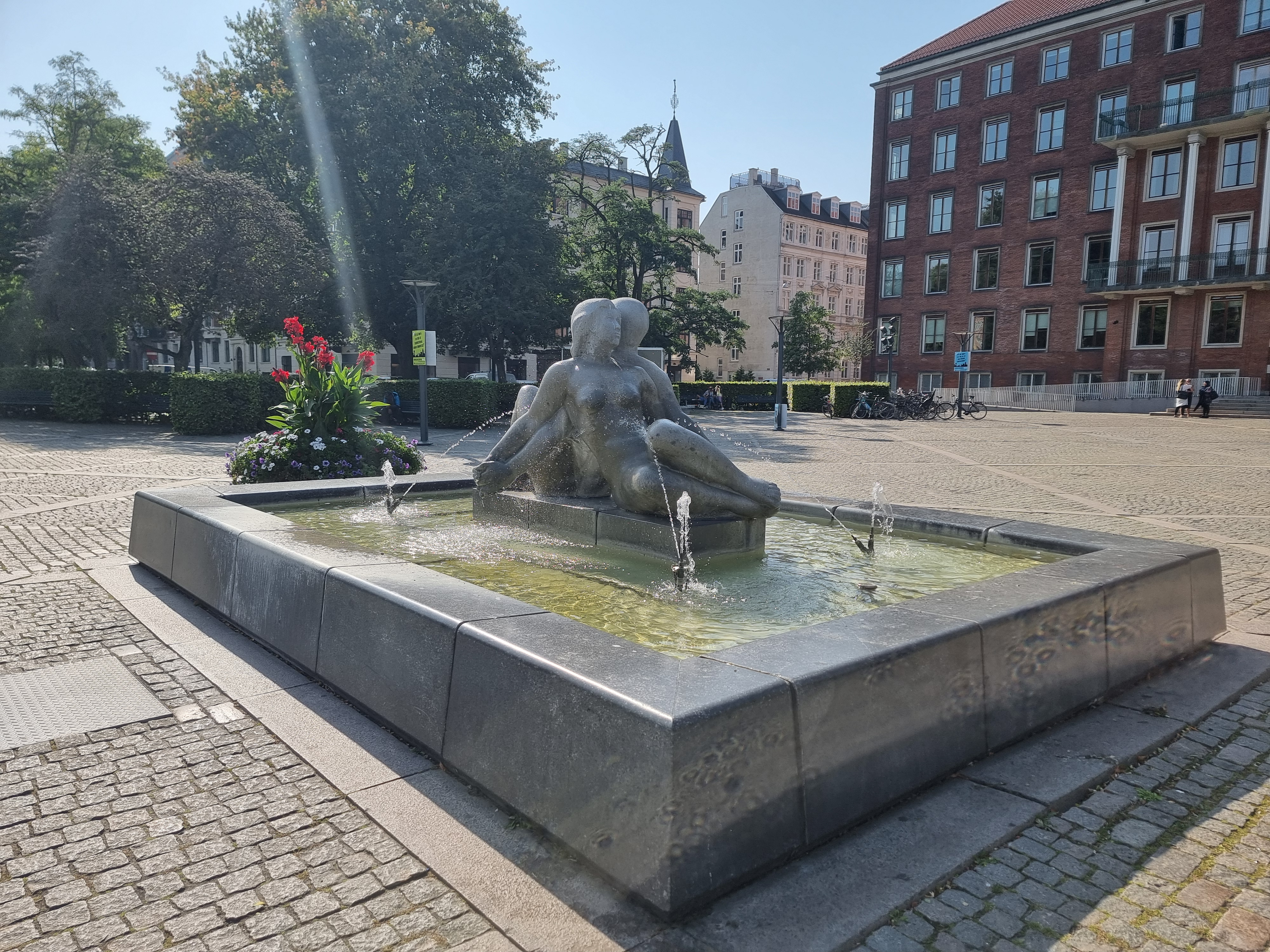
Anker Hoffmann's fountain, in front of the city hall.

A new plaza in front of the town hall was established in connection with its inauguration.

In 1960, a small fountain, designed by Anker Hoffmann, was constructed in the square. It depicts two young people sitting back to back.

To the northern side of the plaza, there is an area for restaurant and bar businesses, while to the south there is a small green area with benches

== See also ==
- List of mayors of Frederiksberg Municipality
