= List of mayors of Frederiksberg Municipality =

This is a list of mayors of Frederiksberg Municipality, Denmark

The first person in Frederiksberg Municipality with a title of mayor was elected in 1919.

Before 1919, political leaders in the area held the titles "Formand for sogneforstanderskabet" (1841 - 1867) and "Sognerådsformand" (1867 - 1919). Both of these terms have similar meanings, roughly translating to "parish council chairman".

The title "Formand for sogneforstanderskabet" was superseded by "Sognerådsformand" in 1867, and in 1970 replaced by alternative titles such as mayor.

== List ==
Name	Term of office		Political Party
Povel Povelsen	1842	1843	Society of the Friends of Peasants (Bondevennernes Selskab)
Harald Raasløff	1847	1851	
Ernst Emil Rosenørn	1858	1861	Right (Højre)
N.F. Jespersen	1861	1862	(Died in office)
R.C. Stæger	1862	1872	
N.F. Schlegel	1872	1891	Right, (Died in office)
Frederik Asmussen	1891	1896	Right
E.M. Jacoby	1896	1908	
Niels Petersen	1908	1909	Danish Social Liberal Party (Det Radikale Venstre)
Marius Godskesen	1909	1936	Until 1915: Right From 1915: Conservative People's Party (Det Konservative Folkeparti)
Vilhelm Fischer	1936	1948	Conservative People's Party
Aksel Møller	1948	1950	Conservative People's Party
Arne Stæhr Johansen	1950	1954	Conservative People's Party
Aksel Møller	1954	1958	Conservative People's Party
Arne Stæhr Johansen	1958	1978	Conservative People's Party
John Winther	1978	2001	Conservative People's Party
Mads Lebech	2001	2009	Conservative People's Party
Jørgen Glenthøj	2009	2019	Conservative People's Party
Simon Aggesen	2019	2021	Conservative People's Party
Michael Vindfeldt	2022	-	Social Democrats (Socialdemokratiet)
