= Frederiksberg Municipality =

Frederiksberg Municipality Frederiksberg Kommune (Danish)
- Municipality
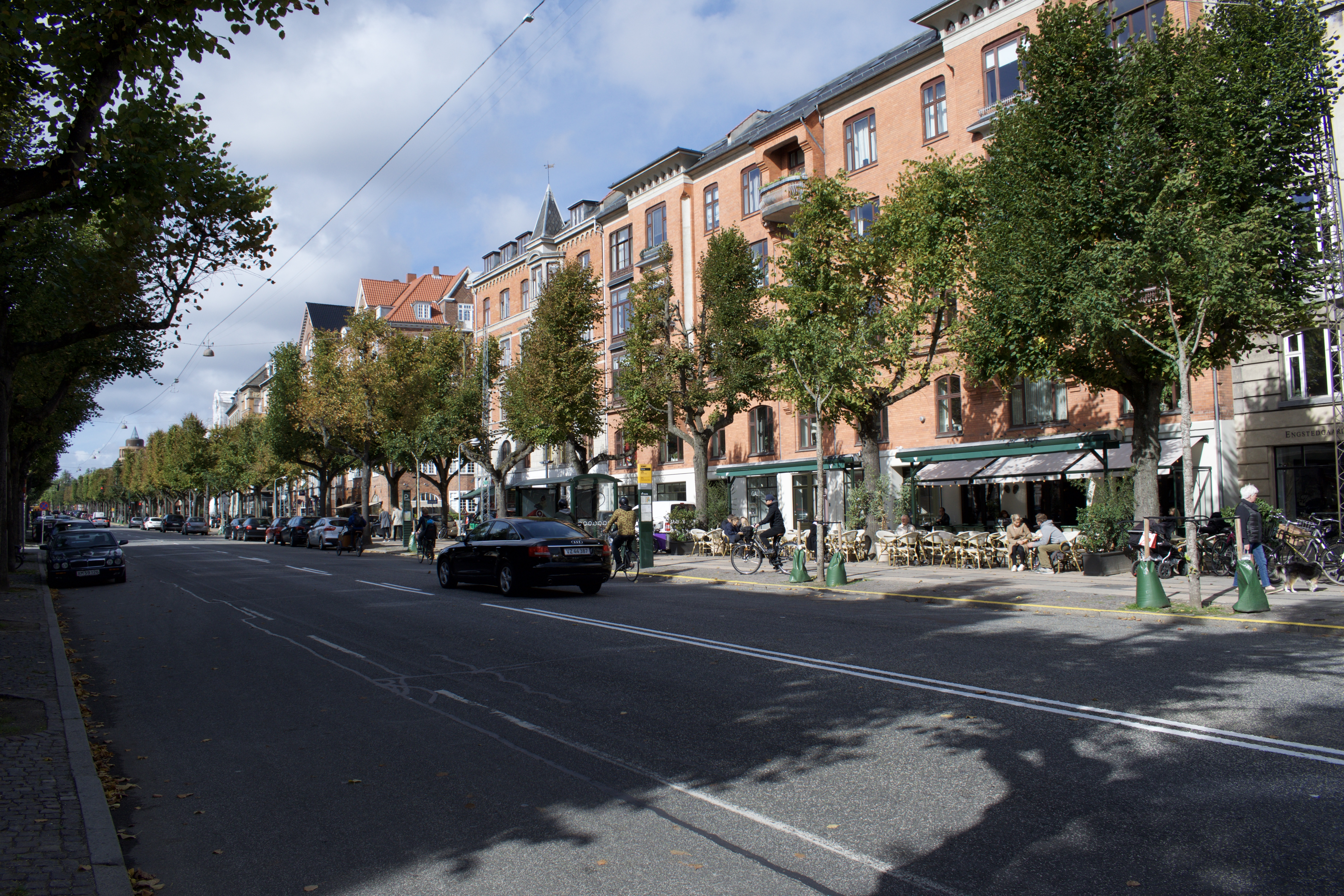

- Coat of arms

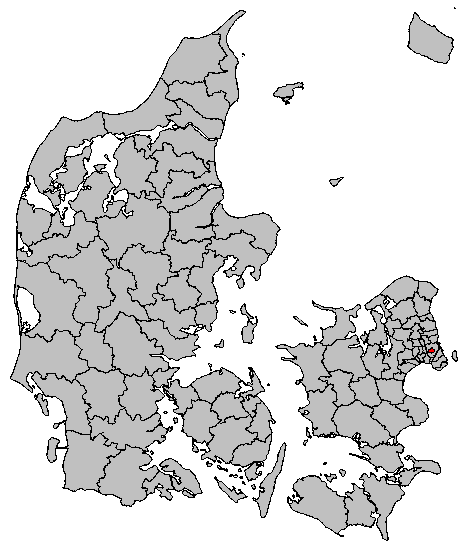
- Coordinates: 55°40′40″N 12°32′00″E
- Country: Denmark
- Region: Hovedstaden
- Seat: Frederiksberg

Government
  - Mayor: Michael Vindfeldt

Area
  - Total: 8.7 km^{2} (3.4 sq mi)

Population (1 January 2026)
  - Total: 106,150
  - Density: 12,000/km^{2} (32,000/sq mi)
- Time zone: UTC1 (CET)
  - Summer (DST): UTC2 (CEST)
- Postal code: 2000
- Website: www.frederiksberg.dk

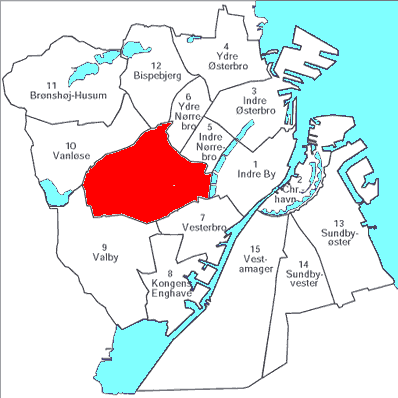
Locator map in Copenhagen

Frederiksberg Kommune is a municipality (Danish, kommune) on the island of Zealand (Sjælland) in Denmark. Part of the Capital Region of Denmark and the city of Copenhagen, it is an enclave surrounded by Copenhagen Municipality. The municipality, co-extensive with its seat, covers a total area (land and water) of 8.71 km^{2} (3.36 square miles; 871 hectares) according to the Municipal Key Figures and has a population of 106,150 (1 January 2026) making it the smallest municipality in Denmark area-wise, the seventh most populous, and the most densely populated. Its mayor is Michael Vindfeldt from the Social Democrats serving from 1 January 2022.

The city of Frederiksberg is the only town in the municipality, and is therefore the site of its municipal council.

Frederiksberg is located as an enclave within the municipality of Copenhagen, the national capital. The municipality was originally situated west of Copenhagen, but after a number of smaller municipalities were merged with Copenhagen in 1901, it became surrounded by Copenhagen.

Frederiksberg was one of the three last Danish municipalities not belonging to a County—the others being Copenhagen and Bornholm. On 1 January 2007, the municipality lost its county privileges and became part of Region Hovedstaden (i.e. the Copenhagen Capital Region).

Frederiksberg municipality was not merged with other municipalities as the result of nationwide Kommunalreformen ("The Municipal Reform" of 2007).

== Politics ==
=== Municipal council ===
As of the 2026-2029 term of office Frederiksberg's municipal council has increased its council to 31 members, elected every four years.

Below are the municipal councils elected since the Municipal Reform of 2007.

Election	Party									Total seats	Turnout	Elected mayor
Election	A	B	C	F	I	O	V	Ø	Å	Total seats	Turnout	Elected mayor
2005	5	2	13	2			1	2		25	64.7%	Mads Lebech (C)
2009	6	1	12	4			1	1		25	64.2%	Jørgen Glenthøj (C)
2013	4	2	10	2	1	1	2	3		25	70.3%	Jørgen Glenthøj (C)
2017	4	3	11	1	1		1	3	1	25	71.2%	Jørgen Glenthøj (C)
2021	5	3	13	1			1	6		25	73.4%	Michael Vindfeldt (A)
2025	7	3	11	2	1		2	5		25	73.2%	Michael Vindfeldt (A)
Data from Valg.dk 2005, 2009, 2013 2017 2021 and 2025

=== Mayors ===
Start	End	Title/Education	Name	Party
1842	1843	Etatsråd	Povel Povelsen	Society of the Friends of Peasants
1847	1851	Assessor	Harald Raasløff	
1858	1861	Godsejer	Ernst Emil Rosenørn	Højre (1848-1866)
1861	1862	Justitsråd	N.F. Jespersen	Died
1862	1872	Etatsråd	R.C. Stæger	
1872	1891	Justitiarius	N.F. Schlegel	Højre (1881). Died
1891	1896	Lawyer (Supreme Court)	Frederik Asmussen	Højre
1896	1908	Dr.med.	E.M. Jacoby	
1908	1909	Overretssagfører	Niels Petersen	Danish Social Liberal Party
1909	1936	Overretssagfører	Marius Godskesen	Højre; from 1915: Conservative
1936	1948	Direktør	Vilhelm Fischer	Conservative People's Party (Denmark)
1948	1950	Statsrevisor	Aksel Møller	Conservative People's Party (Denmark)
1950	1954	Branddirektør	Arne Stæhr Johansen	Conservative People's Party (Denmark)
1954	1958		Aksel Møller	Died
1958	1978		Arne Stæhr Johansen	
1978	2001	Vicedirektør	John Winter	Conservative People's Party (Denmark)
2001	2009	Chefjurist	Mads Lebech	Conservative People's Party (Denmark)
2009	2019	Seniorproduktchef	Jørgen Glenthøj	Conservative People's Party (Denmark)
2019	2021	Lawyer	Simon Aggesen	Conservative People's Party (Denmark)
2022		Lawyer	Michael Vindfeldt	Social Democrats

== Main sights ==
- Frederiksberg Campus (University of Copenhagen)
- Frederiksberg Gardens
- Frederiksberg Hospital
- Frederiksberg Palace
- Frederiksberg Town Hall
- Copenhagen Business School
- Copenhagen Zoo
- Royal Danish Military Academy
- Church of the Deaf
- Listed buildings in Frederiksberg Municipality

== Twin towns – sister cities ==
Frederiksberg is twinned with:

- Bærum, Norway
- Hafnarfjörður, Iceland
- Hämeenlinna, Finland
- Qeqertarsuatsiaat, Greenland
- Tartu, Estonia
- Tórshavn, Faroe Islands
- Uppsala, Sweden

== Notable residents ==
- Claes Bang, actor (Taxa, Dracula)
- Anna Karina, French-naturalized Danish actress, director, model, writer and singer (born in Frederiksberg)

== Gallery ==
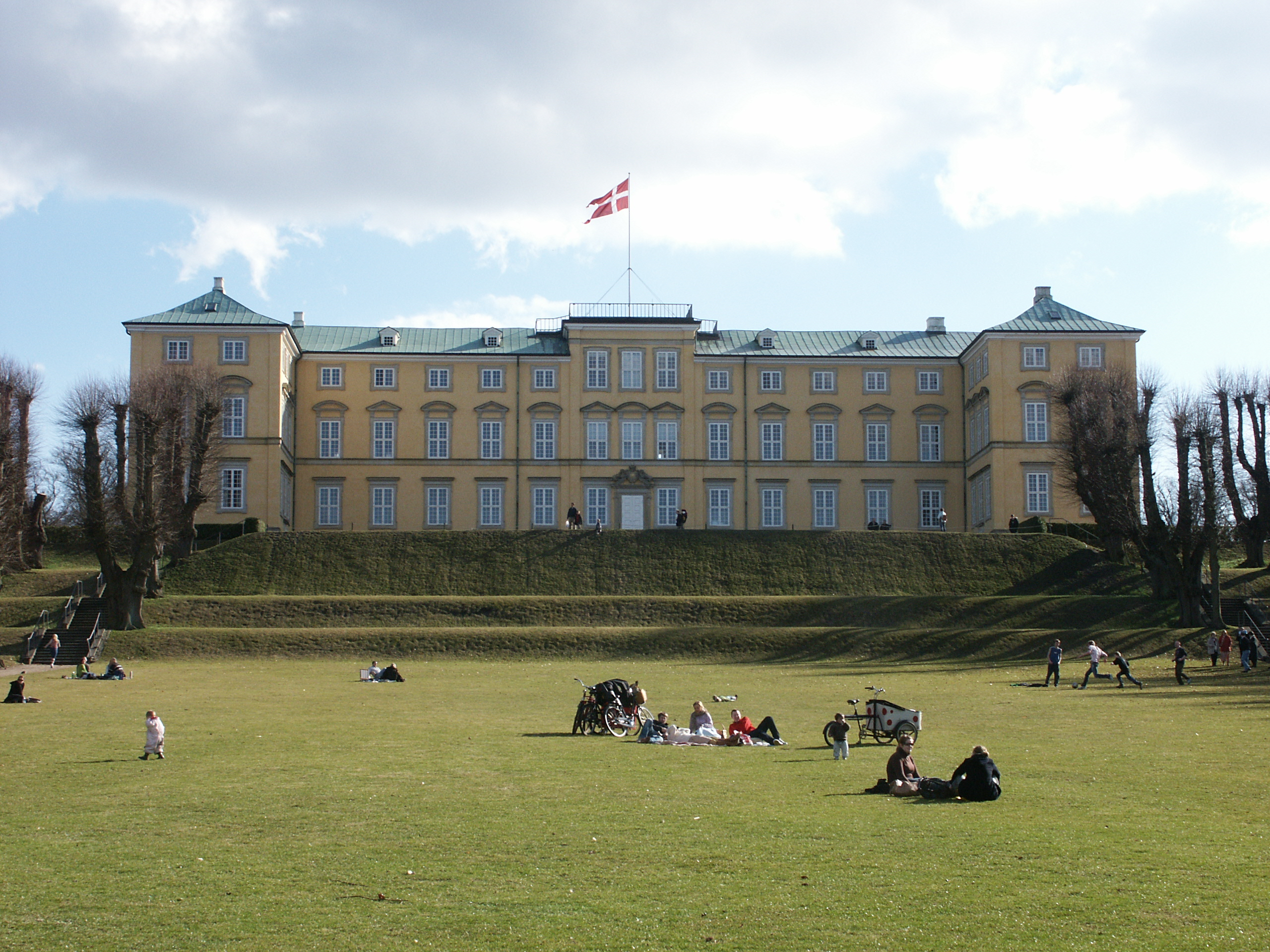
Frederiksberg Palace

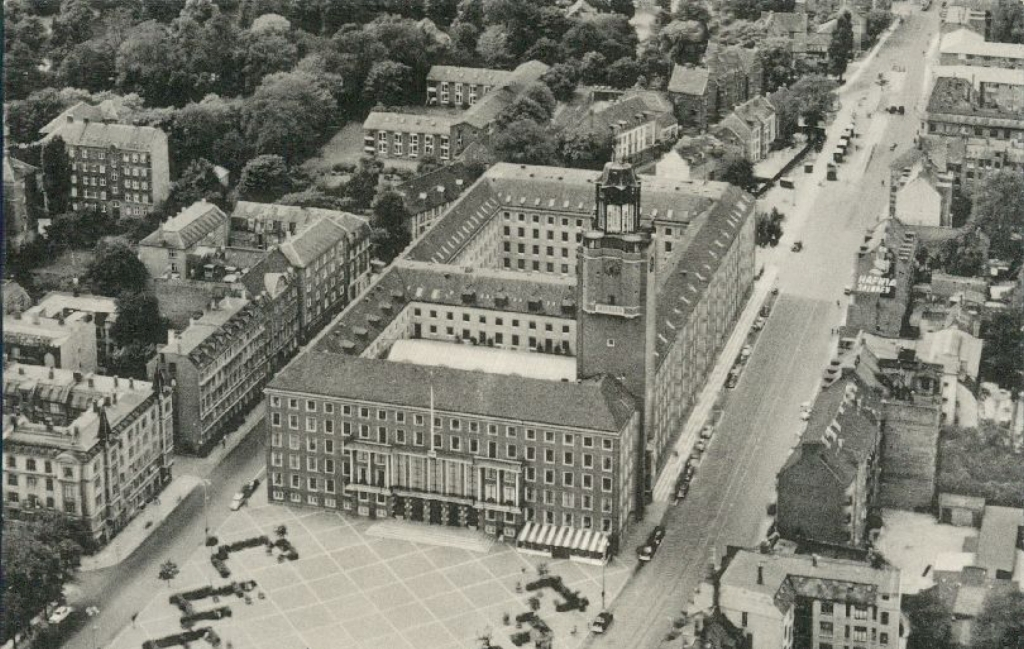
Frederiksberg Town Hall

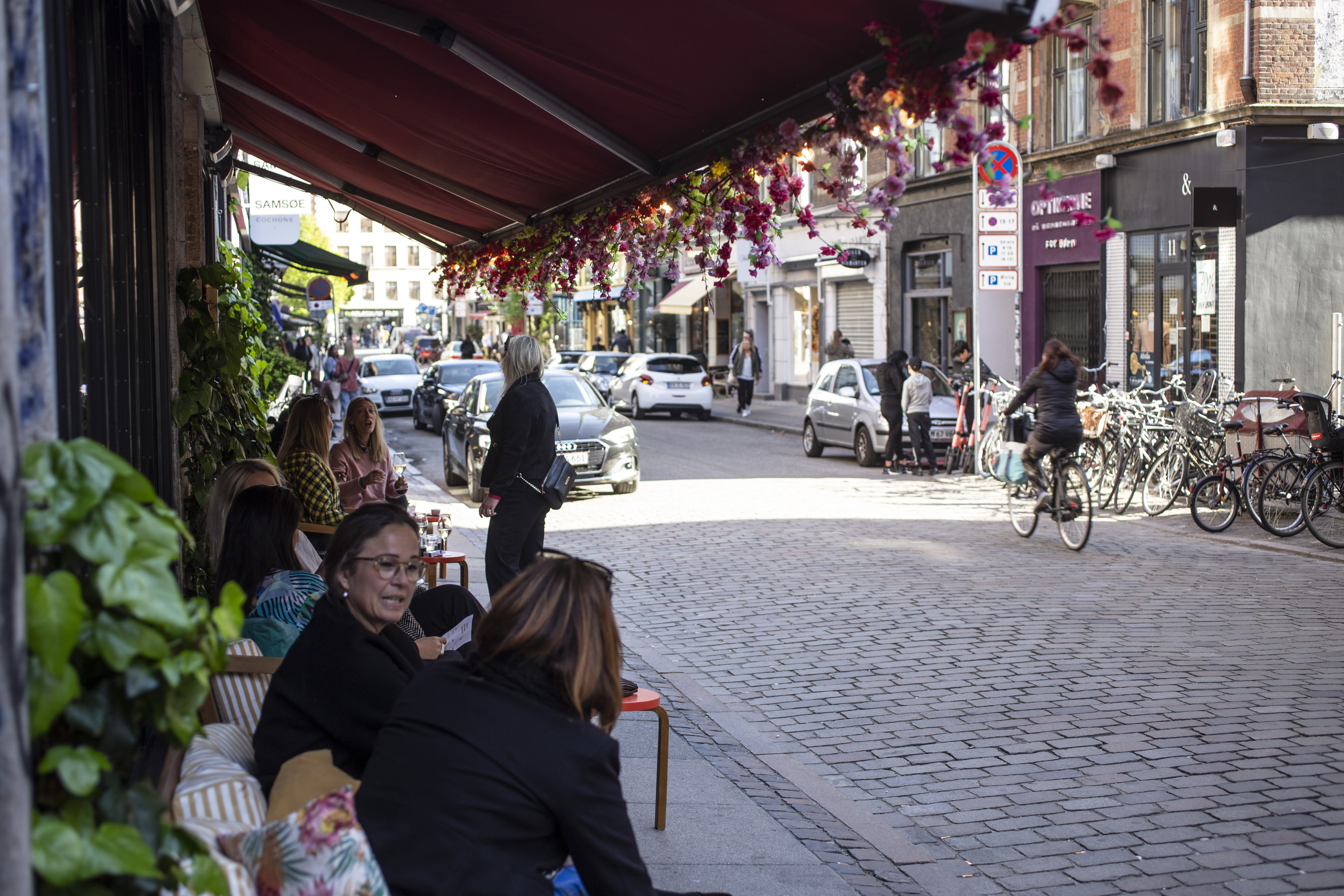
A café on Værnedamsvej

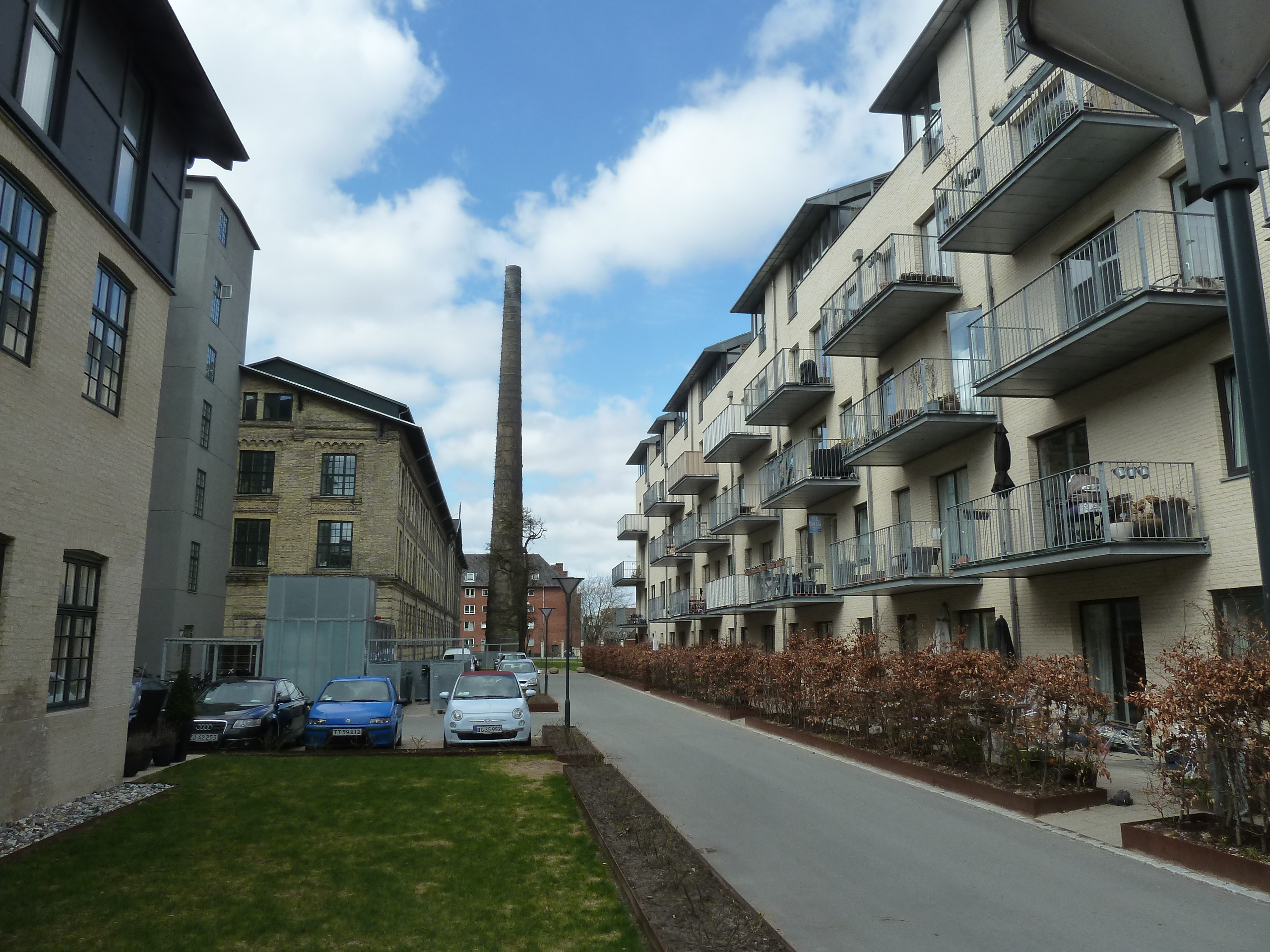
The grounds of the former porcelain factory now house residential units

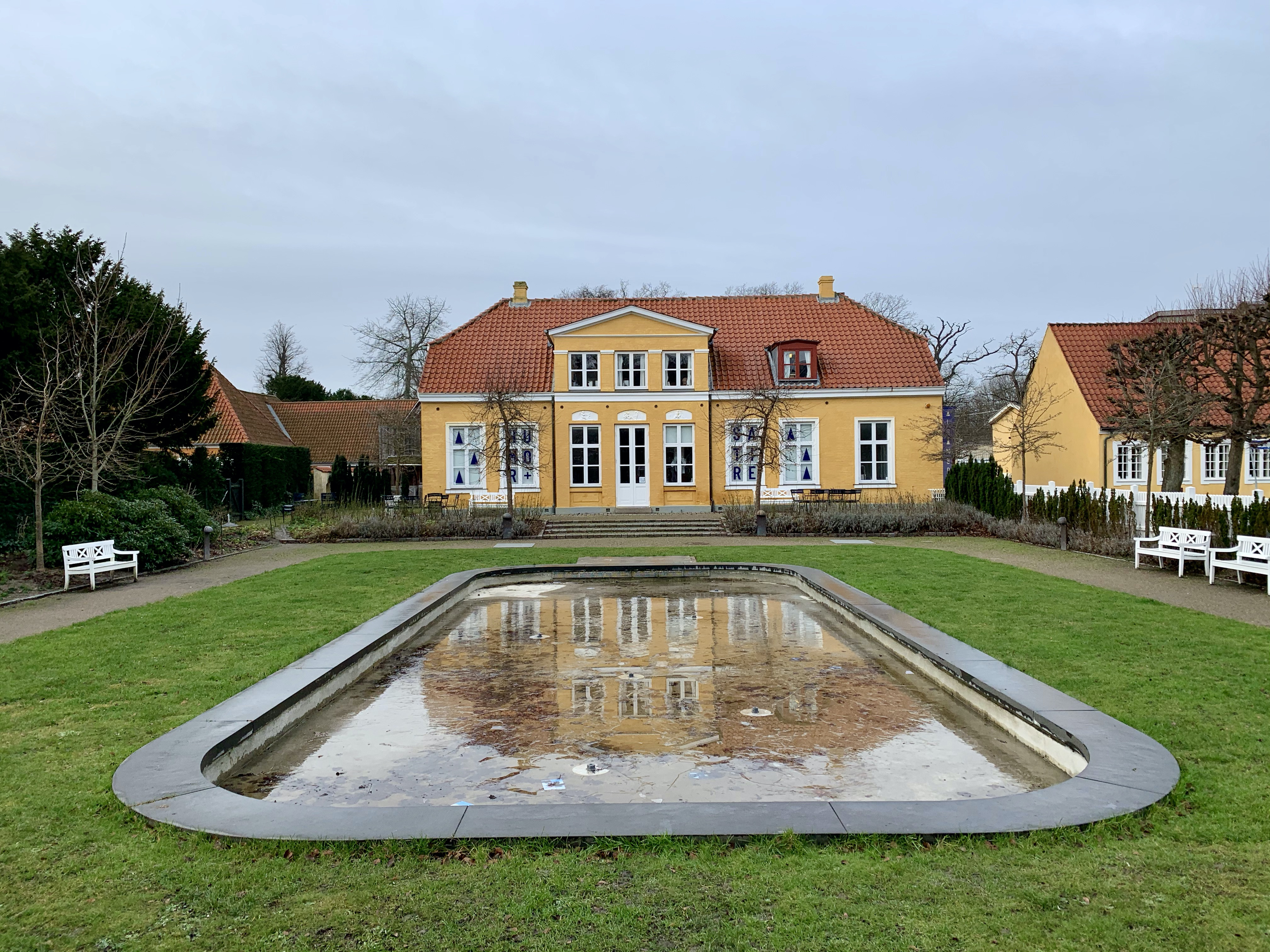
The Alhambra museum

== See also ==
- Frederiksberg station
