= Royal Danish Military Academy =

Danish military academy

- Hærens Officersskole
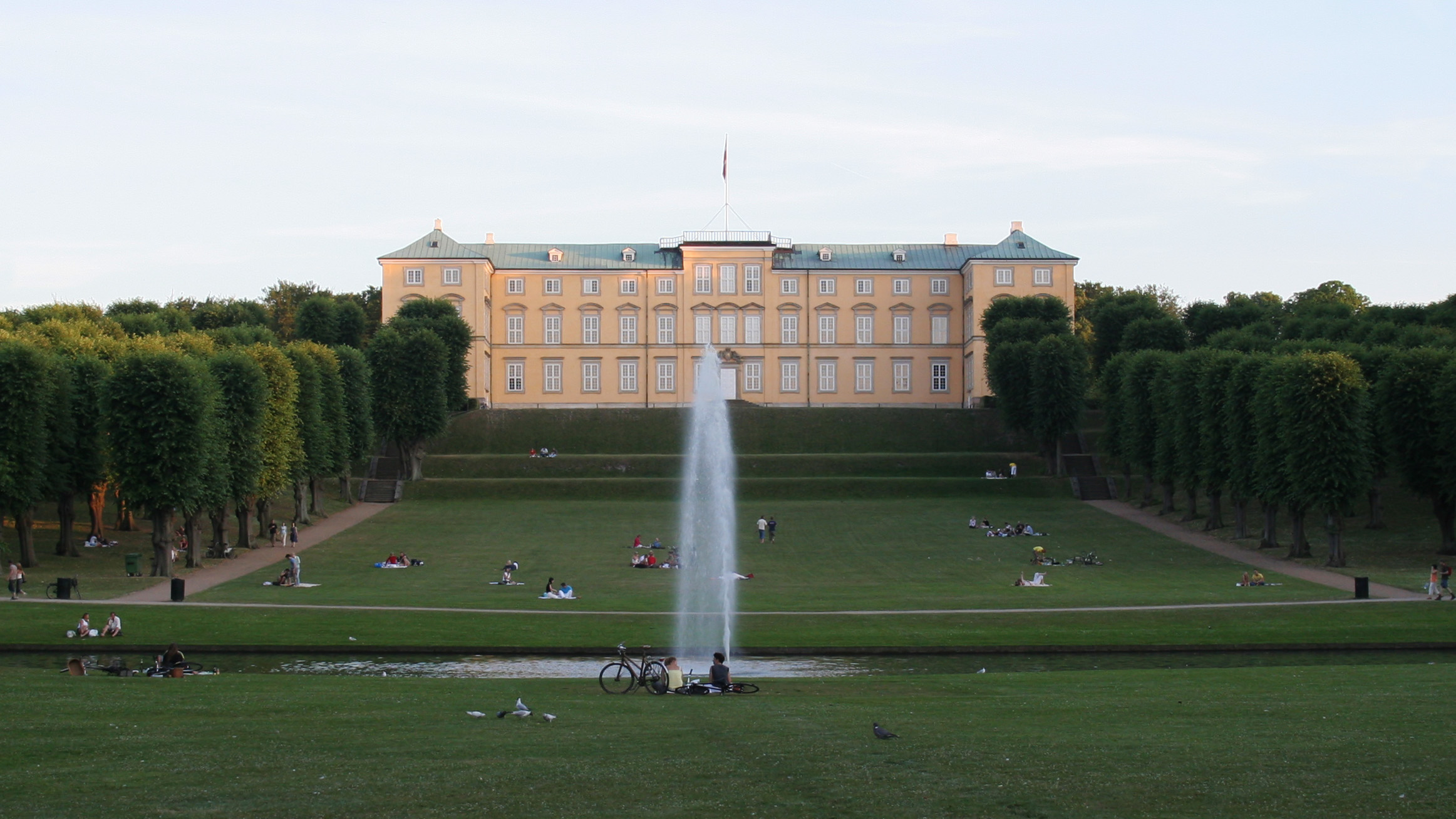
- Frederiksberg palace seen from Frederiksberg Park
- Former names: Landkadetakademiet
- Motto: Ingenio et Armis (Latin)
- Motto in English: With wisdom and weapons
- Type: Army academy
- Established: 1713; 313 years ago
- Affiliations: Danish Defence
- Academic affiliations: Royal Danish Defence College
- Officer in charge: Colonel Thor Hilton
- Location: Copenhagen, Denmark; 55.672129°N 12.525295°E
- Campus: Frederiksberg Palace
- Website: Official website

The Royal Danish Military Academy (Danish: Hærens Officersskole) educates and commissions all officers for the Royal Danish Army. The Military Academy function was initiated in 1713 by request of King Frederick IV on inspiration from the Naval Academy.

== Location ==
The academy has, since 1869, been located at Frederiksberg Palace in central Copenhagen.

== Other Danish officer academies ==
- Navy: The Royal Danish Naval Academy located at Svanemøllens Barracks in Copenhagen.
- Air force: The Royal Danish Air Force Academy located at Svanemøllen Barracks in Copenhagen.
- Emergency Management Agency: The Emergency Management Officers School located at Bernstorff Palace in Gentofte
