= Frederiksberg Palace =

Coordinates: 55°40′18″N 12°31′30″E

- Frederiksberg Slot
- Frederiksberg palace seen from Frederiksberg Gardens (2022)

- Location within Denmark

General information
- Type: Palace
- Architectural style: Baroque
- Location: Copenhagen, Denmark
- Construction started: 1699
- Completed: 1735

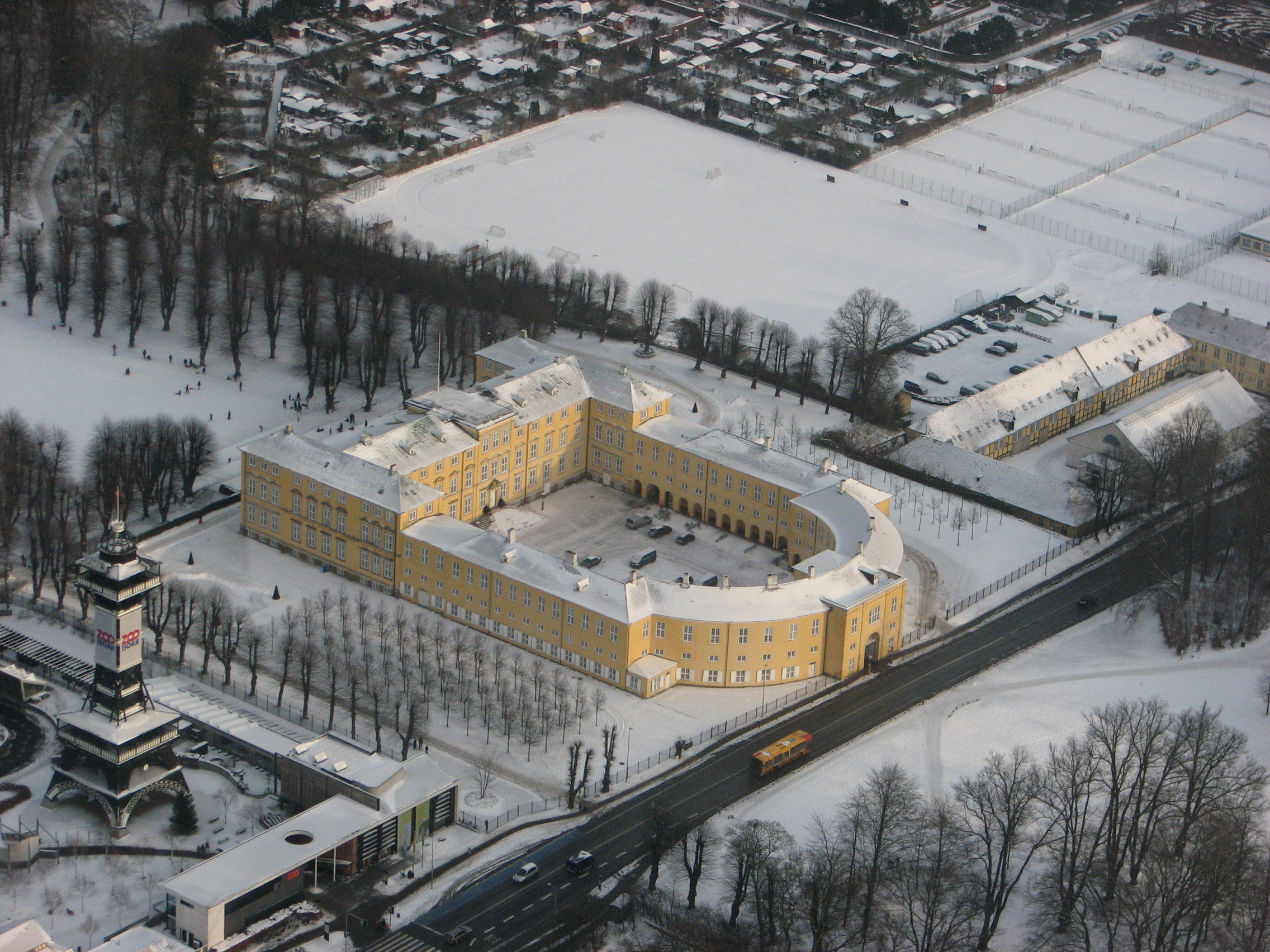
An aerial view during winter

Frederiksberg Palace (Danish: Frederiksberg Slot) is a Baroque residence, located in Frederiksberg, Denmark, adjacent to the Copenhagen Zoo. It commands a view over Frederiksberg Gardens, originally designed as a palace garden in the Baroque style. Constructed and extended from 1699 to 1735, the palace served as the royal family's summer residence until the mid-19th century. Since 1869, it has housed the Royal Danish Military Academy.

== Style and history ==
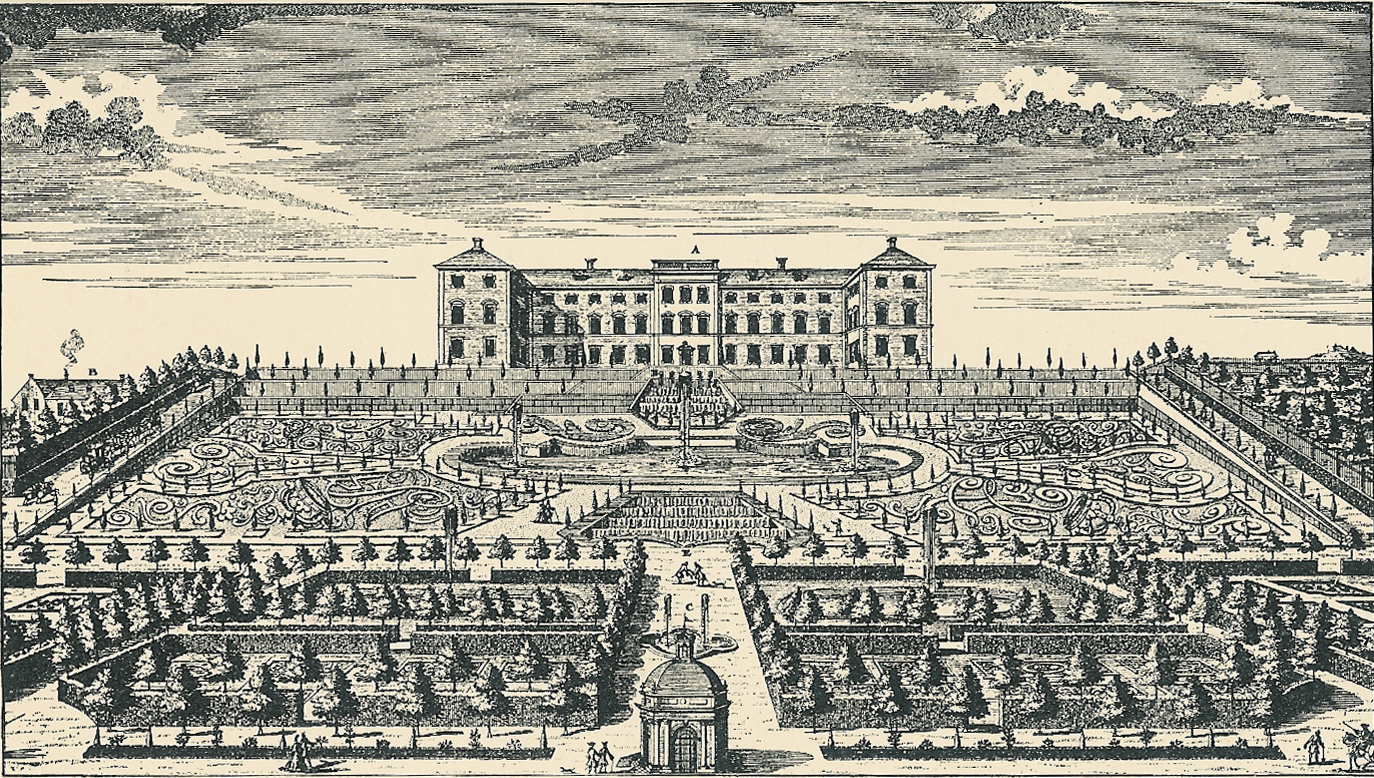
Frederiksberg Palace in 1718 with the original Baroque garden

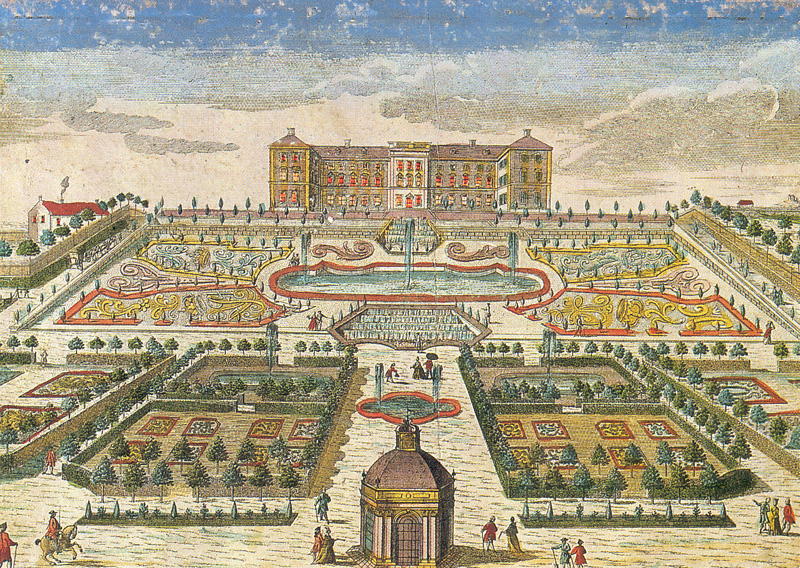
Frederiksberg Palace in about 1750

As crown prince, Frederick IV had broadened his education by travelling in Europe. He was particularly impressed by the architecture in Italy and, on his return to Denmark, asked his father, Christian V, for permission to build a summer palace on Solbjerg as the hill in Valby was then known.

The original building, probably designed by Ernst Brandenburger, was completed in 1703 for Frederick IV as a small, one-storey summer residence. The first major extension, when it was converted into a three-storey H-shaped building, was completed in 1709 by Johan Conrad Ernst, giving the palace an Italian Baroque appearance. It was Lauritz de Thurah who executed the third and final extension from 1733 to 1738 when the palace received extensions to the lateral wings encircling the courtyard.

Frederick IV spent many happy years at the palace. In 1716, he received the Russian czar Peter the Great at Frederiksberg Palace and in 1721, shortly after the death of his first wife, Queen Louise, he married his mistress Anne Sophie Reventlow there. Christian VII who was married to the English princess Caroline Matilda also spent some time in the palace. Their son, who was to become Frederick VI, loved the palace and lived there both as crown prince and as king.

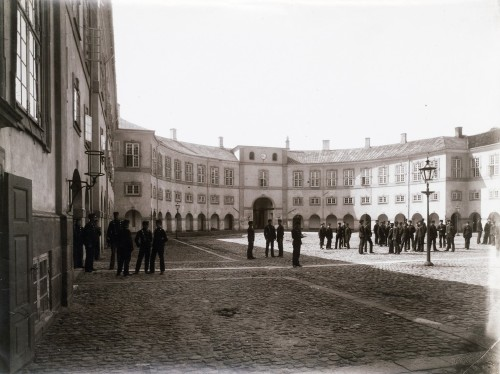
Students from the officer's academy in the courtyard, c. 1895

After Frederick VI's dowager wife Queen Marie died at the palace in March 1852, the building lay empty and fell into disrepair. In 1868, it was transferred to the War Ministry and the following year it became the Officers Academy.

The building has twice undergone significant restoration work, first from 1927 to 1932 and later from 1993 to 1998.

== Chapel ==
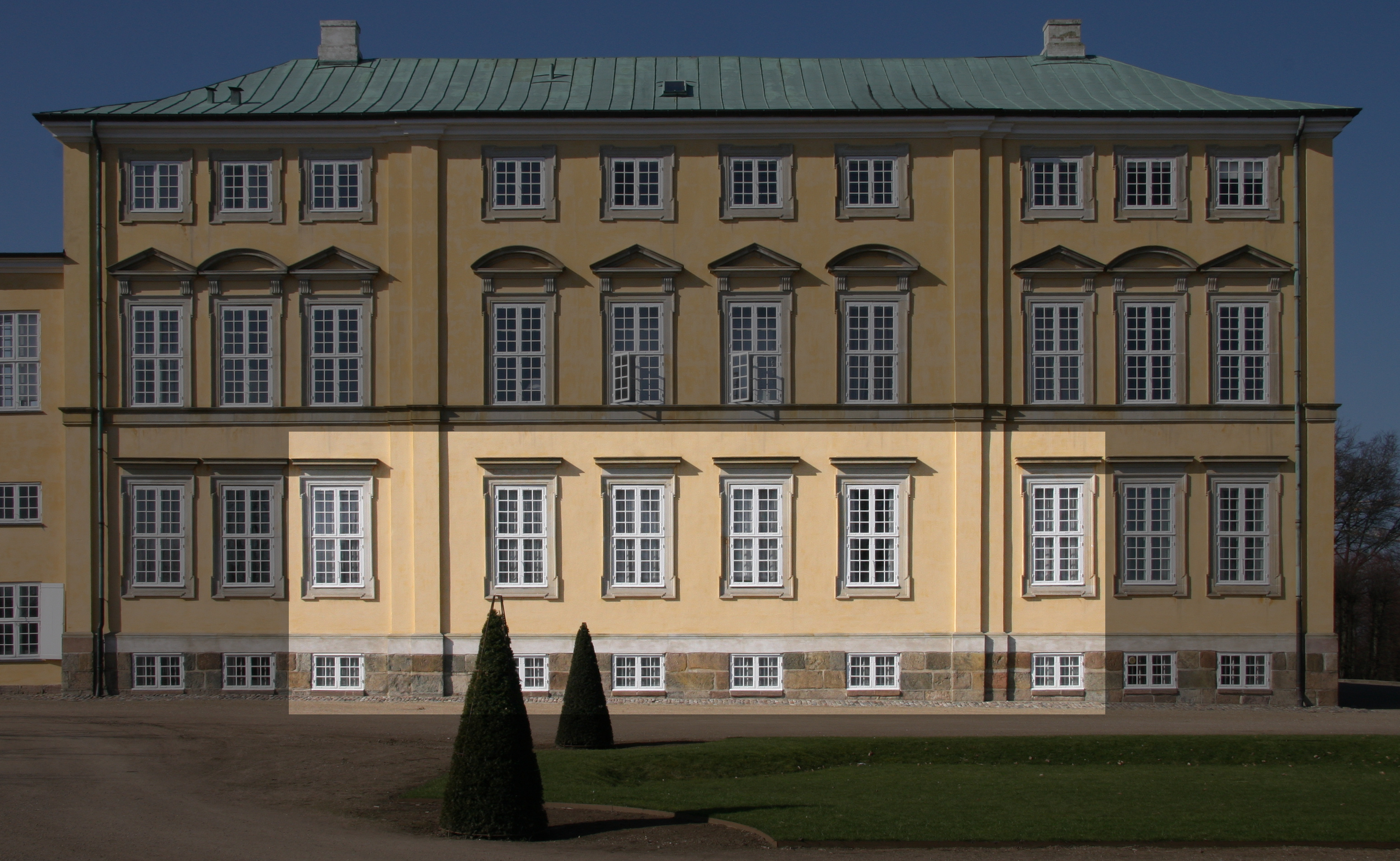
The highlighted windows show the location of the chapel in the east wing

During the construction of the original palace building, it was decided that there should be a chapel in the east wing. This probably explains why there is no indication of the chapel from the outside. It actually covers the space behind the six central windows on the ground floor.

Wilhelm Friedrich von Platen and Ernst Brandenburger designed the chapel in the Baroque style. It was inaugurated on 31 March 1710. When the palace was taken over by the Officers Academy, the chapel's furnishings, including the impressive pulpit, were transferred elsewhere. However, they were returned in the 1930s and can still be seen there today.

The palace and the chapel can be visited. They contain imposing stucco work, ceiling paintings, an elegant marble bathroom with a secret access staircase, and the Princesses' pancake kitchen. In 1854, British MP S. M. Peto gave an altar window to the King of Denmark for the chapel; the window was designed by sculptor John Thomas and executed by Ballantine and Allan of Edinburgh.

Since 1932, the chapel has been used as the local parish church.

== The park ==
The palace overlooks Frederiksberg Gardens which dates back to the first palace in 1703. At that time, it was designed by H.H. Scheel with the assistance of garden architect J.C. Krieger as a strictly symmetrical Baroque garden with waterfalls and rows of linden trees along the palace terrace.

From 1795 to 1804, it was redesigned by Peter Pedersen as an English landscape garden with the winding paths, lakes, islands and canals which can be seen today. It was during this period that the Chinese Summerhouse (Andreas Kirkerup, 1801) and the Apis Temple (N.A. Abildgaard, 1804) were added.

== See also ==
- List of Baroque residences
- List of castles and palaces in Denmark
- Tourism in Denmark
