= Rahbek =

Rahbek is a surname. Notable people with the surname include:

- Kamma Rahbek (1775–1829), Danish artist, salonist, and lady of letters
- Knud Lyne Rahbek (1760–1830), Danish literary historian, critic, writer, poet, and magazine editor
