= Christian Molbech =

Danish historian, writer, and theater director

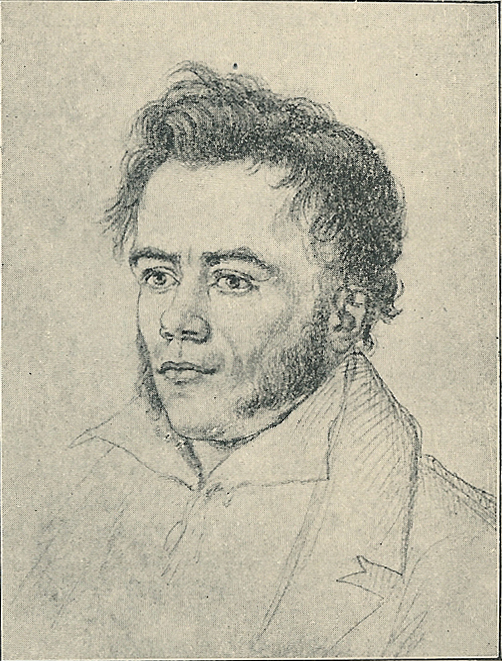
Christian Molbec drawing by A. Jensen

Christian Molbech (8 October 1783 – 23 June 1857) was a Danish historian, literary critic, writer, and theater director. He was a professor of literature at the University of Copenhagen and was the founding editor of Historisk Tidsskrift

== Early life and education ==
Christian Molbech was born and raised at Sorø on the island of Zealand in Denmark. He was the son of professor at Sorø Academy Johan Christian Molbech (1744–1824) and his wife Louise Philippine Friederike Tübell (1760–1829). He graduated from Sorø Academy in 1802.

== Career ==
Molbech was employed at the Royal Danish Library in 1804. He was thus never formally trained as a historian. In 1829 he succeeded Knud Lyne Rahbek as professor of literature at the University of Copenhagen. He also functioned as the director of the Royal Danish Theatre from 1830 to 1842.

In 1839 he participated in the founding of the Danish Historical Society (Den danske historiske Forening). In 1840, he was founder and first editor of Historisk Tidsskrift, which is the oldest still published scientific historical journal in the world.

Molbech also wrote various philological works, including "The Danish Dictionary" (Dansk Ordbog) 1828–1833 and the "Danish Dialect Dictionary" (Dansk Dialektleksikon) 1833–1841. Om public Bibliotheker (1829) was a pioneering work in library science.

Furthermore, he wrote the "Historical Annals for Enlightenment and Education in the History of the North, specifically the History of Denmark" (Historiske Aarbøger til Oplysning og Veiledning i Nordens, særdeles Danmarks Historie I-III) in 3 volumes between 1845 and 1851, which was meant as a reference work for historians and which was groundbreaking in the establishment of the chronology of Danish history.

== Personal life ==
Molbech met Johanne Christine Langberg (April 1793 - 24 July 1879) at Bakkehuset in Copenhagen which was owned by Knud Lyne Rahbek and his wife Kamma Rahbek. They married on 23 October 1820. She was the daughter of dispachør and later justitsråd Knud Engelbreth Langberg (1760–1833) and Birgitte Marie Jacobsen (c. 1769–1829). They were the parents of poet Christian Knud Frederik Molbech (1821–1888).

Christian Molbech was a member of the Royal Danish Academy of Sciences and Letters and was made a Commander First Class of the Order of the Dannebrog in 1853. He died in Copenhagen and was buried at Sorø Gamle Kirkegård.

== Other Sources ==
- Morten Borup (1954) Christian Molbech (Copenhagen: Rosenkilde & Bagger)
