= Frederiksberg Åndsvageanstalt =

Former hospital in Denmark

Coordinates: 55°40′07″N 12°31′59″E

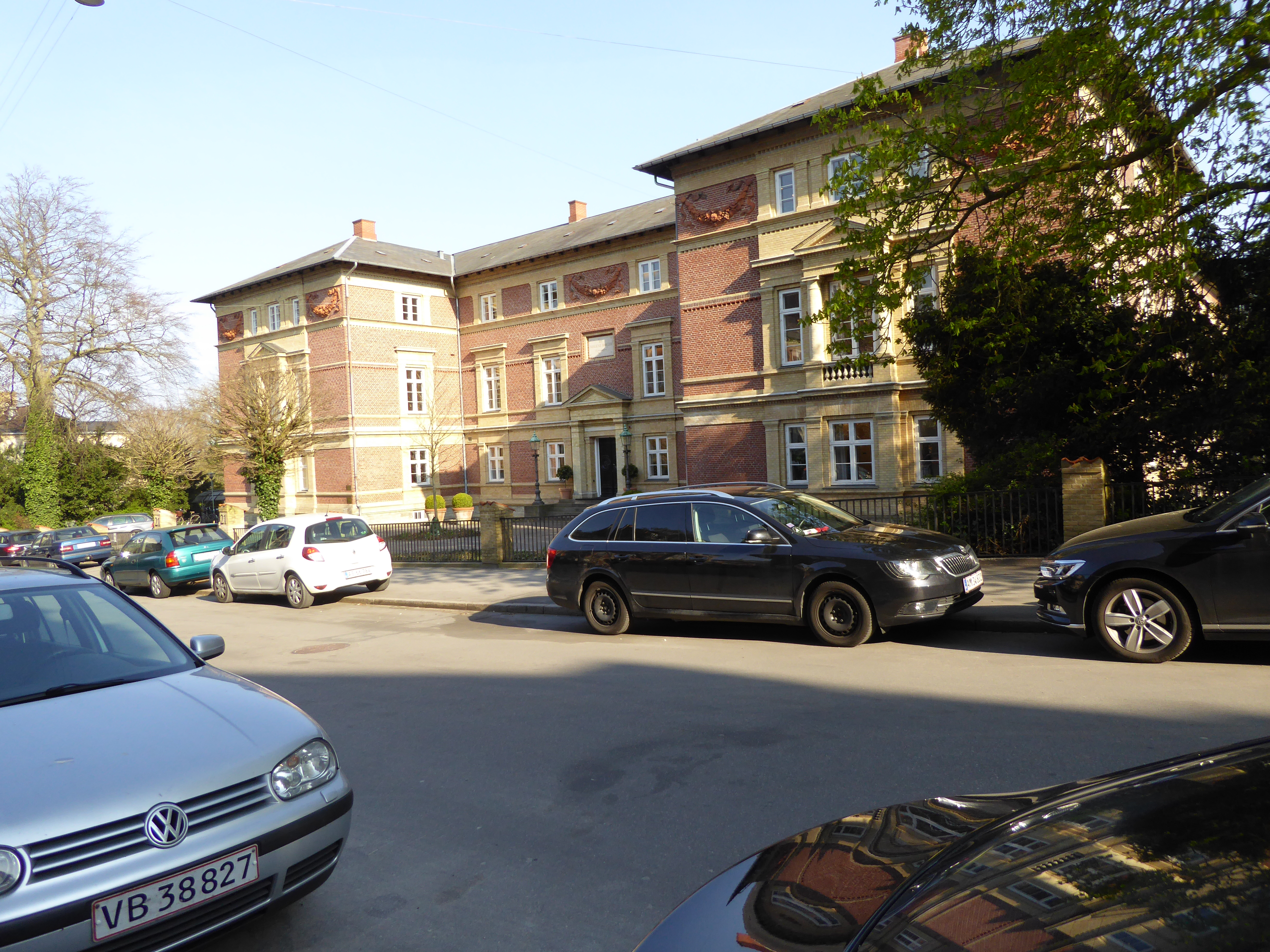
Frederiksberg Åndsvageanstalt

Frederiksberg Åndsvageanstalt is a former mental health treating institution for children located on Rahbeks Allé in the Frederiksberg district of Copenhagen, Denmark. It was founded in 1855 and moved to Ebberød in Birkerød in 1970. Its old main building (Rahbeks Allé 21) from 1860 was designed by Ferdinand Meldahl and is listed. It now houses the clothing brand By Malene Birger. Another building (Bag Elefanterne 8) has been converted into a daycare. The buildings are located adjacent to the former Carlsberg brewery site, which is under redevelopment into a new, dense neighborhood.

== History ==
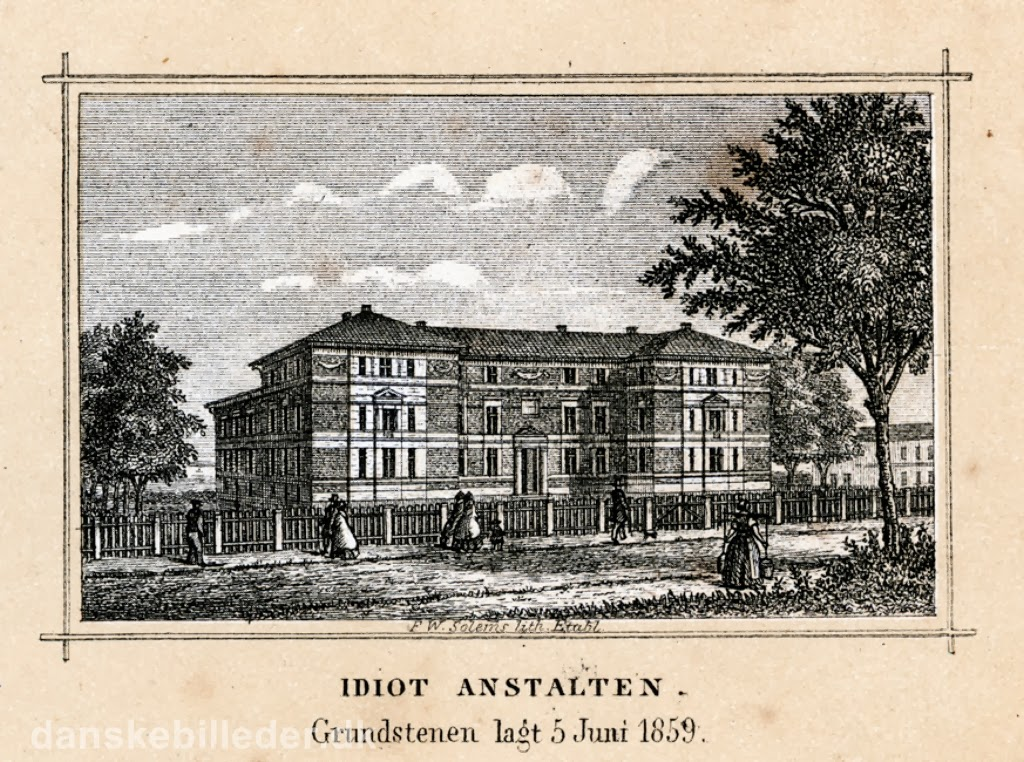
Frederiksberg Åndsvageanstalt

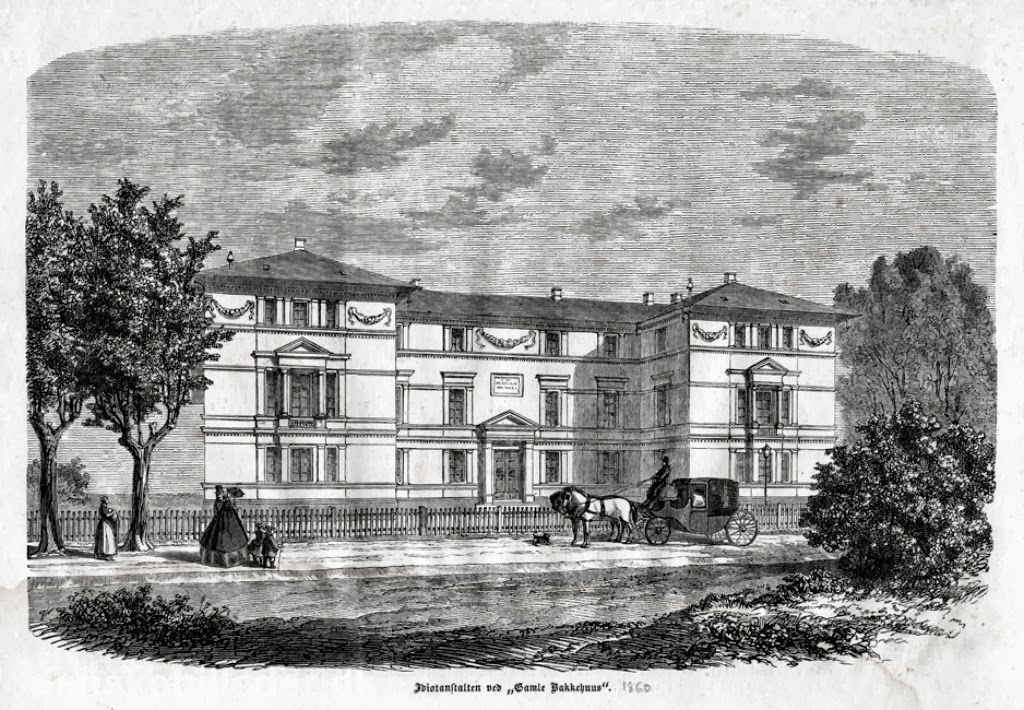
Frederiksberg Åndsvageanstalt

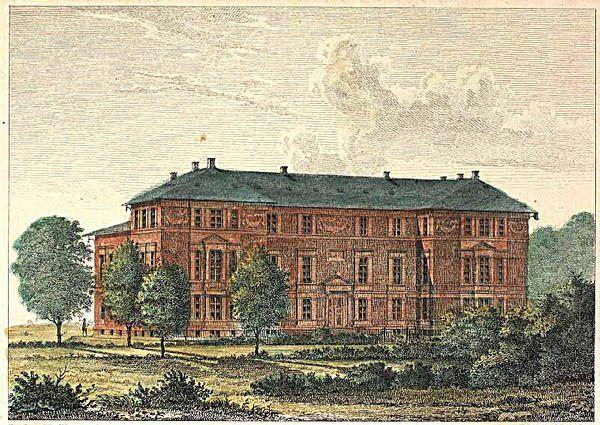
Frederiksberg Åndsvageanstalt, c. 1870

Helbredelsesanstalten for idiotiske Børn, also referred to as Idiotanstalten, was founded in 1855 and originally based in the nadkacent property Bakkehuset. Its new building was built 1859–1860 to design by Ferdinand Meldahl.

The institution later changed name to Frederiksberg Åndsvageanstalt and moved to Ebberød in Birkerød in 1970 and the building was listed in 1976. It was used by Carlsberg Group until 2008 and for a while housed its subsidiary DanBrew.

== Architecture ==
The building has an H-shaped floor plan. It is built in red and yellow brick in a Historicist style inspired by Italian Renaissance architecture. Facade decorations include terracotta reliefs of laurel wreaths.

== Today ==
It has later been rented out to smaller companies, including the By Malene Birger clothing company. Another building was purchased by Copenhagen Municipality in 2013 and converted into a daycare.

== See also ==
- Listed buildings in Frederiksberg Municipality
