= Saint Tropez (brand) =

Danish fashion brand

Saint Tropez is a Danish fashion brand. It is now owned by DK Company.

== History ==
Saint Tropez was founded by Niels-Henrik Henriksen in 1984. The company was acquired by IC Companys with effect from 1 January 2002. In January 2019, IC Group sold Saint Tropez to DK Company.

== Organisation ==
Sofie Lindahl-Jessen replaced Hans-Petersen as CEO of Saint Tropez in 2017. She came from a position as Executive Vice President for Sales and Brand Communication at Republic of Fritz Hansen. Anna Juul Jepsen has been design manager since 2016.

== Distribution ==
Saint Tropez operates 38 Saint Tropez stores in Denmark (2017). Products are also sold as wholesale and through online sale to consumers.

=== Saint Tropez stores ===
- Aarhus
- Copenhagen
  - City centre (Vimmelskaftet 43, Købmagergade 42 and Magasin du Nord)
  - Amager (Amagerbrogade 46 and Copenhagen Airport)
  - Frederiksberg (Frederiksberg Centret)
  - Glostrup (Glostrup Storcenter)
  - Greve Strand (Waves)
  - Herlev (Herlev Torv)
  - Kongens Lyngby (Lyngby Storcenter and Magasin Lyngby)
  - Østerbro (Østerbrogade 68)
  - Rødovre (Rødovre Centrum)
  - Vesterbro (Fisketorvet)
- Esbjerg
- Frederikssund
- Gilleleje
- Køge
- Kolding
- Helsingør
- Hillerød
- Næstved
- Odense
- Ringsted
- Roskilde
- Vejle
