= Vestergade 24 =

Building in Copenhagen

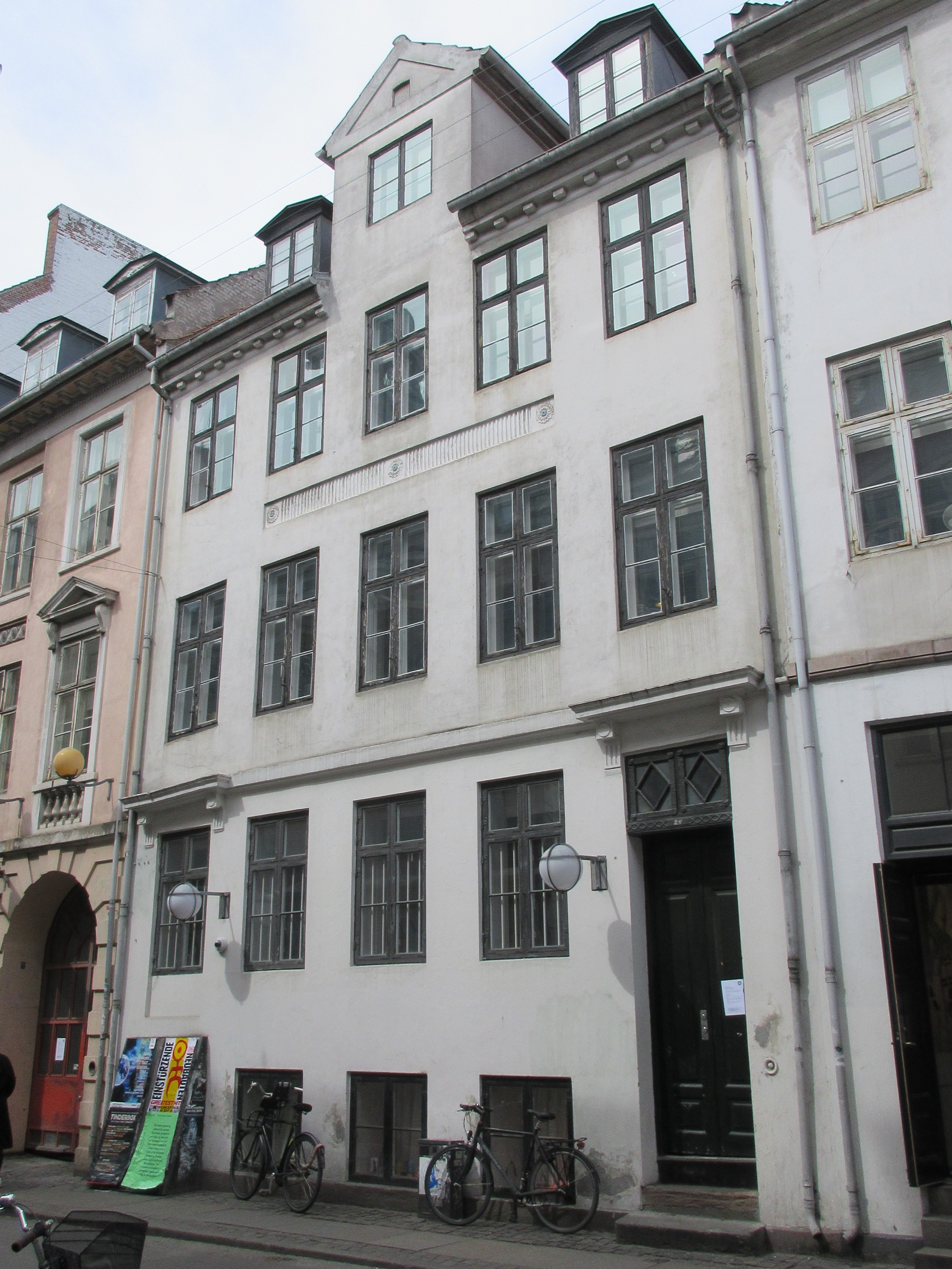
- Interactive map of the Vestergade 24 area

General information
- Location: Copenhagen, Denmark
- Coordinates: 55°40′37.88″N 12°34′9.01″E
- Renovated: 1797

Vestergade 24 is a Neoclassical property in the Latin Quarter of Copenhagen, Denmark. It is now part of the newspaper Politiken's headquarters, The building was listed on the Danish registry of protected buildings and places in 1959.

== History ==
The previous building at the site was destroyed in the Copenhagen Fire of 1795. It had housed a distillery managed by Andreas Johannes Spendrup.

The current building was constructed for a tavernkeeper named Nicolaj Berthelsen in 1796–97. It was later acquired by distiller M. Birk before being sold to tavernkeeper H. O. Hark, and then to tavernkeeper Hans Olsen. The brændevin that was produced in the side wing was served to customers in the front wing or sold as retail. The upper floors of the building contained a few rental dwellings. The tenants were mainly members of the lower middle class but a professor named Wolff was registered as a tenant in 1809 .

Hans Olsen's widow managed the tavern until 1857. The building was then sold to the cashier at the Casino Theatre G. Christian Nicolaysen. He died in 1860 but his widow kept the building for the next almost 40 years. It was after her death acquired by one of her tenants, P. Chr. Hansen, who lived on the third floor. The tavern was located in the basement. The ground floor was in the last decades of the 19th century let out to clockmaker C. Weistrup. The first floor was after Mrs. Nicolaysen's death let to a tobacco merchant and later to a moneylender. The trading firm C. J. Thuesen was for a while based on the second floor. The tavernkeeper lived on the third floor. The bar in the basement was in the 1920s called Centralhallen.

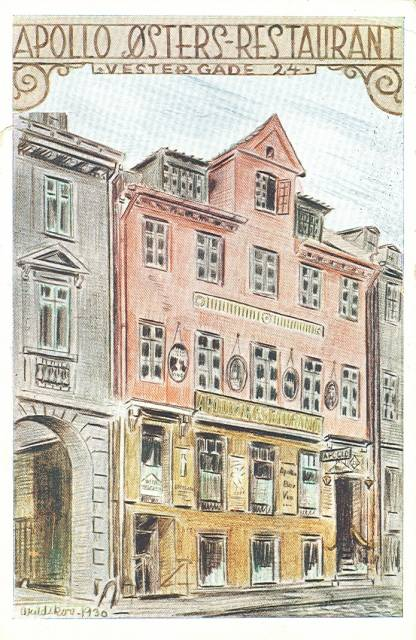
The Apollo Oysters Restaurant at No. 24

The building was in circa 1925 acquired by bank manager Seidel and managing director Nielsen. The name of the bar in the basement was in the early 1930s changed to Stafetten. An oysters restaurant named Apollo opened in the ground floor. It relocated to the first floor in the mid 1930s while the ground floor was converted into a bar under the name Kina. Apollo was in the 1940s converted into a bar and Kina was renamed Gøglervognen.

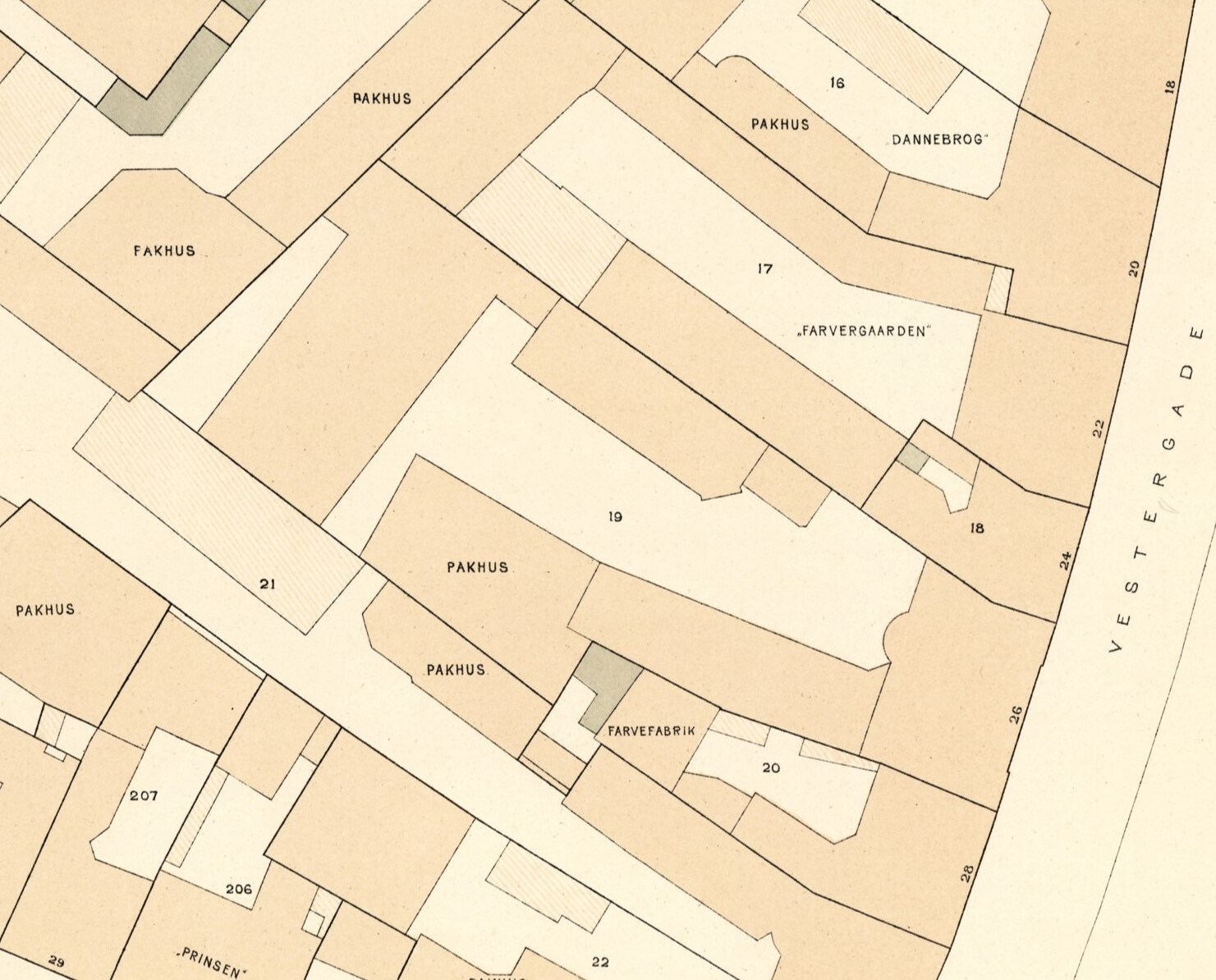
The property seen on one of Berggreen's block plans of Northern Quarter, 1886-88

Vestergade 24 was together with No. 22 and No. 26 later acquired by the hardware company Bucka & Nissen. Marcus Bucka (died 1894) and Hans Nissen (died 1902) had founded the company in Flensburg in 1849. It moved to Copenhagen in 1864 where it was first based at Frederiksholms Kanal 4 and then from 1884 in the side wing at Vestergade 26.

Bucka & Nissen sold their premises in Vestergade to Politikens Hus in 1961.

== See also ==
- Vestergade 22
