= Rahbeks Allé =

Street in Copenhagen, Denmark

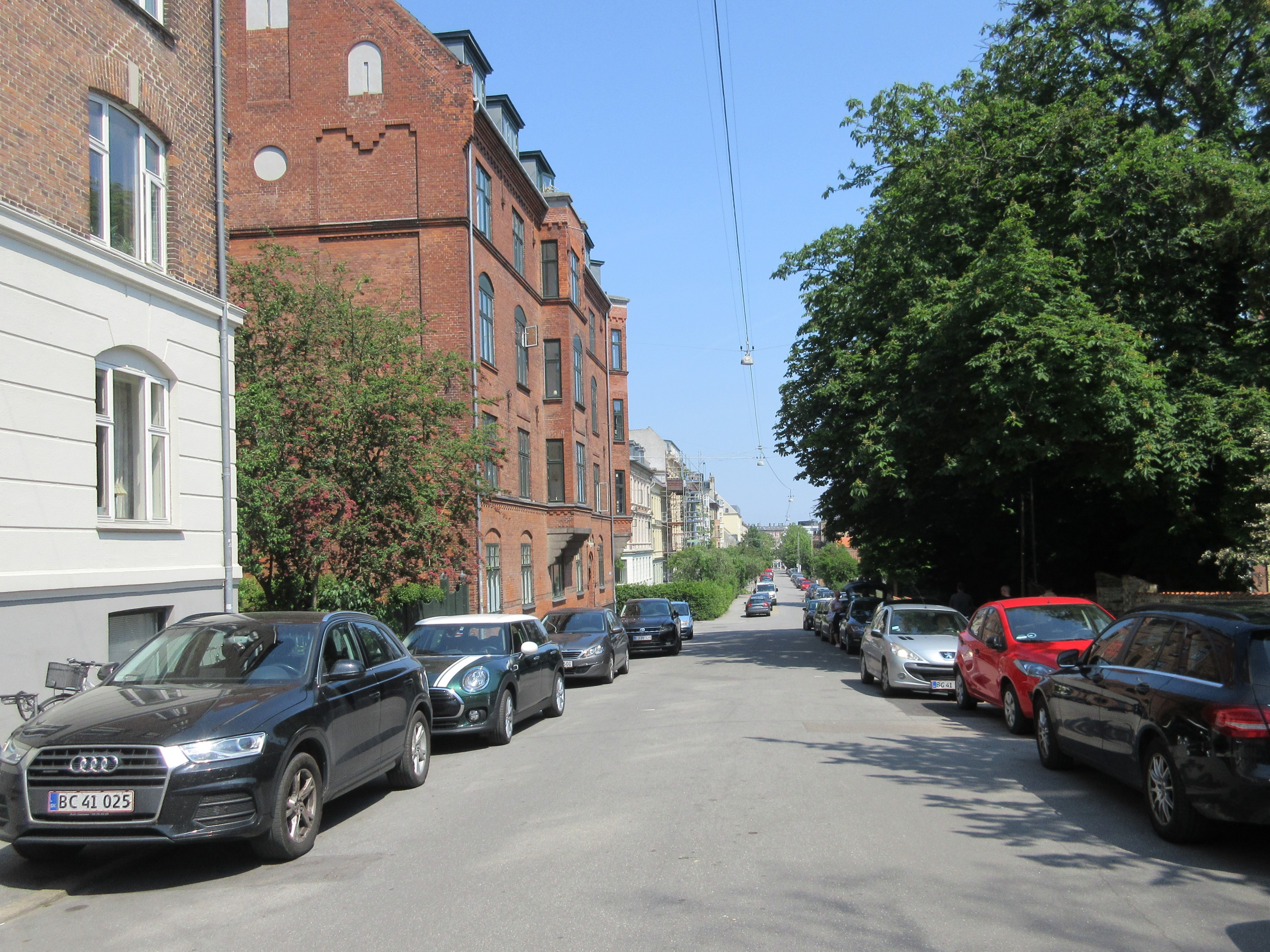
- Length: 518 m (1,699 ft)
- Location: Copenhagen, Denmark
- Quarter: Frederiksberg
- Nearest metro station: Carlsberg
- Coordinates: 55°40′9.12″N 12°32′4.92″E
- Northeast end: Vesterbrogade
- Southwest end: Pile Allé

Rahbeks Allé is a street located on the border between Frederiksberg and Vesterbro in Copenhagen, Denmark. It runs from Vesterbrogade in the northeast to the corner of Søndermarken in the southwest where it joins Pile Alle just before it turns into Valby Langgade on the border to Valby.The former Carlsberg brewery site which is under transformation into a new, dense neighbourhood is located on the south side of the street. Its north side is lined with low, mostly three-storey late-19th century apartment buildings with small front gardens.

== History ==
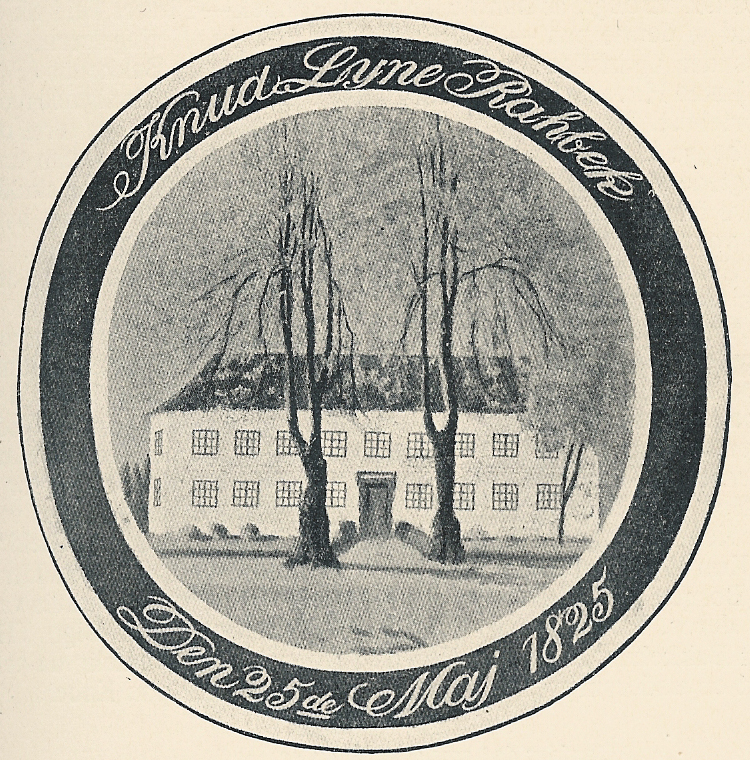
Bakkehuset on Knud Lyne Rahbek's ceremonial target from the Royal Copenhagen Shooting Society

The street is part of the old main road between Copenhagen's West Gate and Roskilde. The road made a detour by way of the village of Valby to avoid the steepest part of Valby Hill (later also referred to as Frederiksberg Hill) where Frederiksberg Palace was built in 1700. The new and shorther Roskilde Road which went through the royal gardens of Frederiksberg Palace was inaugurated in 1776.

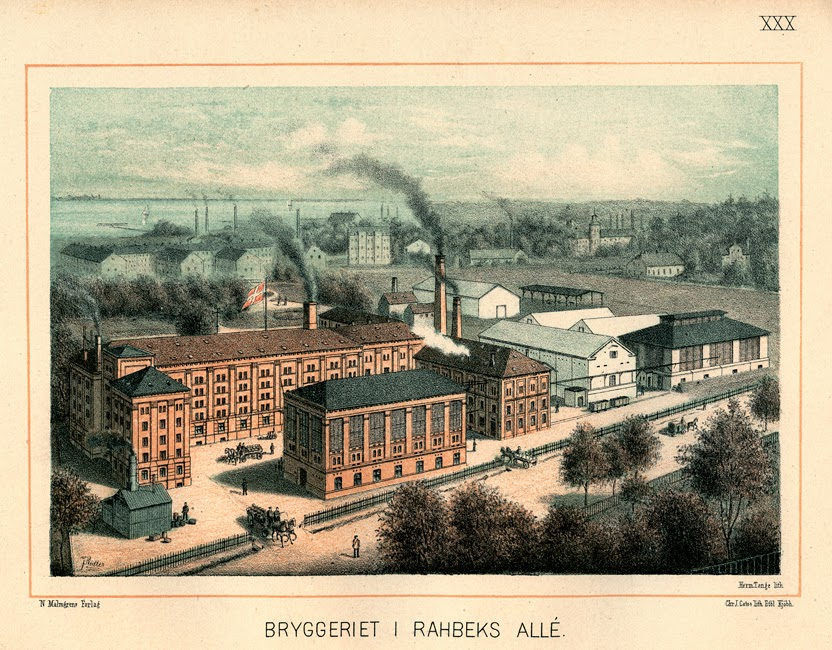
Rahbæks Allé Brewery

Several industroaæ enterprises established along the street in the second half of the 19th century. The Bing & Grøndahl opened on the corner with Vesterbrogade in 1853. A brewery known simply as Bryggeriet i Rahbeks Allé opened on a neighbouring site (Rahbeks Allé 3) in 1860. In 1892 it merged with several other local breweries under the name De Forenede Bryggerier (United Breweries). The site was taken over by Kongens Bryghus in 1923 and became part of Carlsberg Group in 1970.

== Notable buildings and residents ==
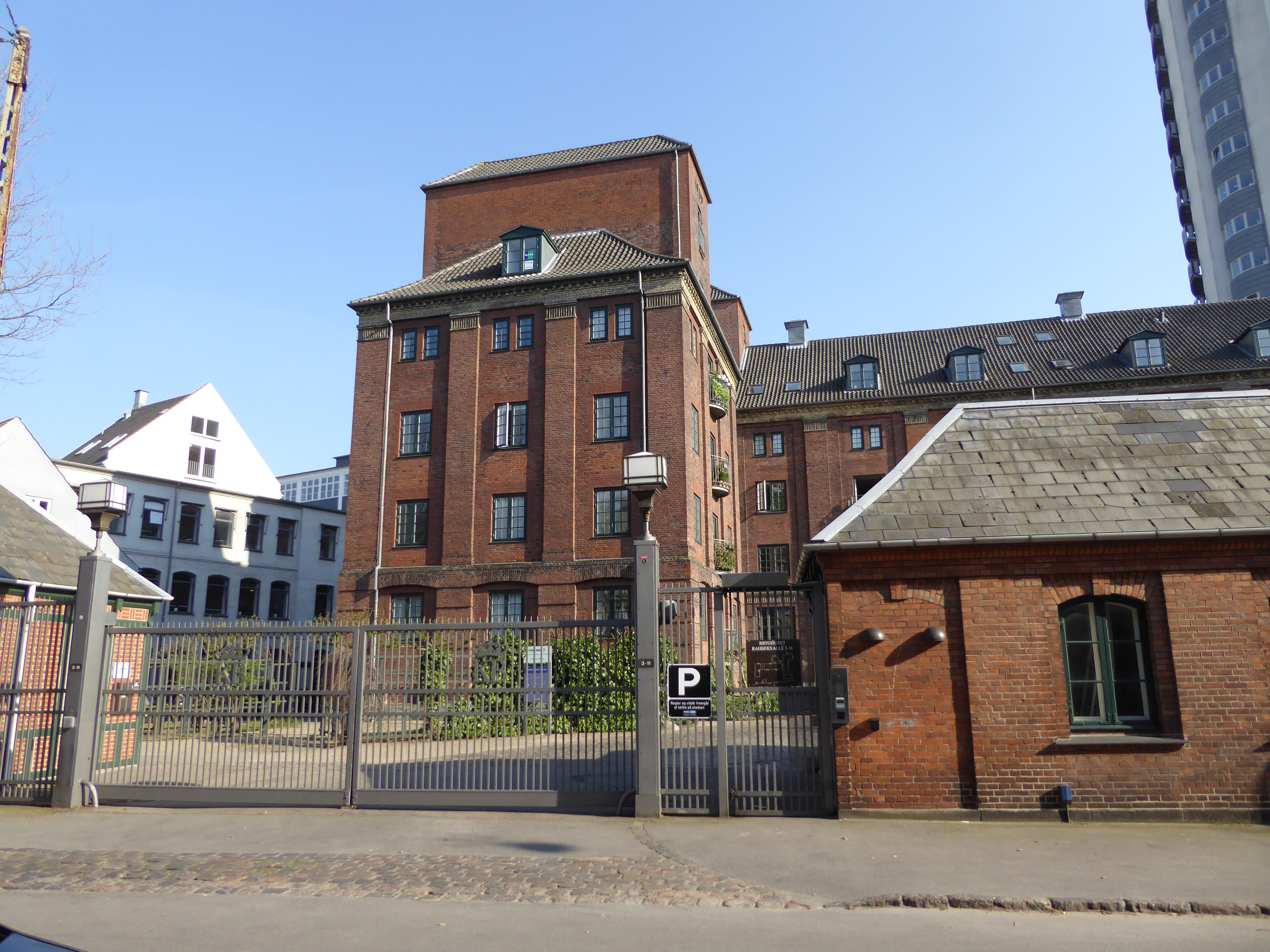
Rahbeks Allé Brewery's former buildings

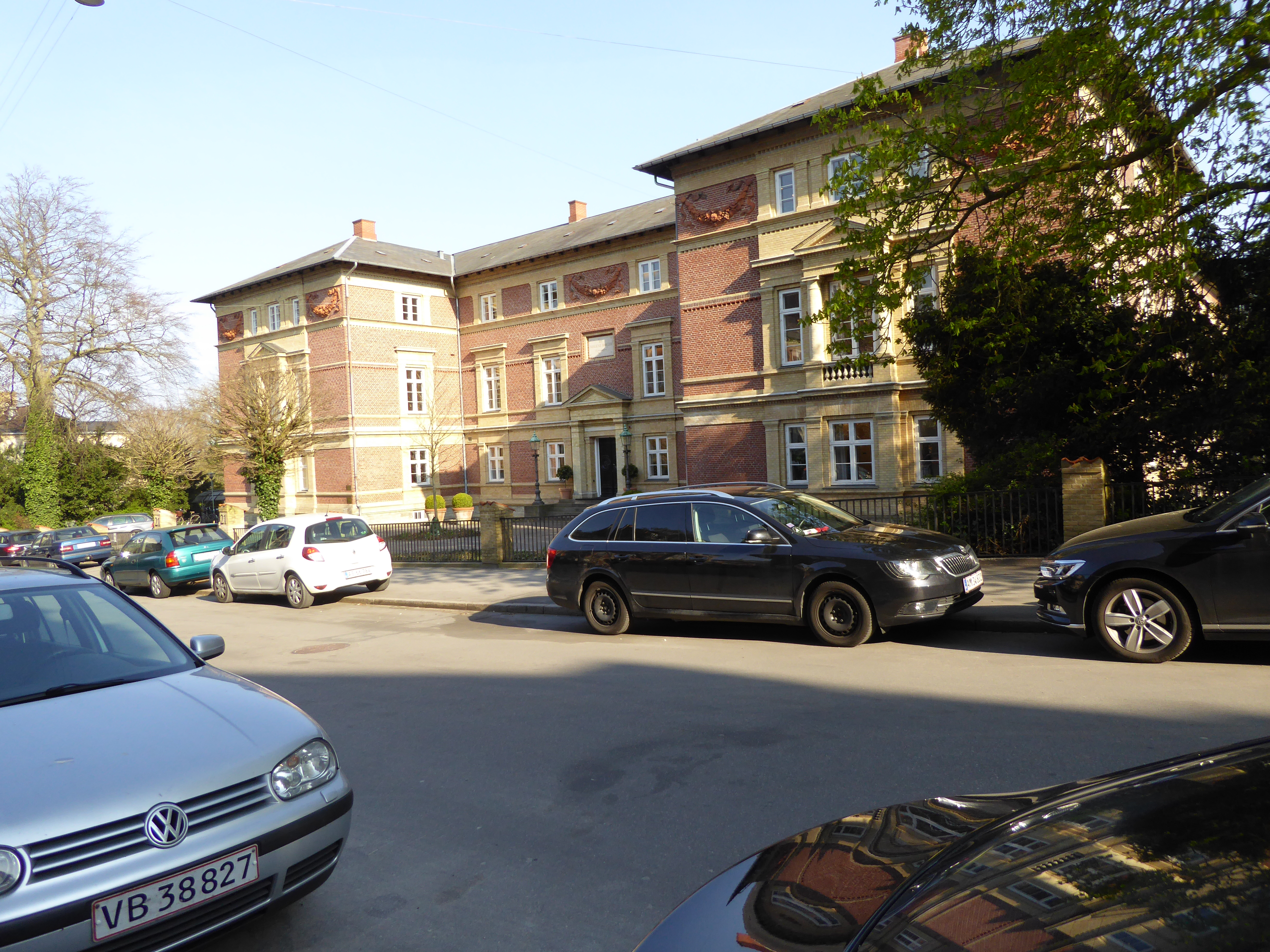
Frederiksberg Åndsvageanstalt

Bing & Grøndahl's former premises (Vesterbrogade 149), now called Bing's, has been converted into an office complex. It consists of 12 buildings and has a total floor area of approximately 35,000 square metres. It is owned by Aberdeen Asset Management and was most recently renovated in 2015.

Most of the Kongens Bryghus buildings have been converted into offices. A silo now known as the Carlsberg Silo has been converted into apartments.

No. 21 is the former Frederiksberg Åndsvageanstalt, a mental health treating institution for children built in 1860 to design by Ferdinand Meldahl. It has later been used by Carlsberg and now houses the clothing company By Malene Birger.

Bakkehuset (No. 23) now serves as a historic house museum. On the other side of the street, at No. 34, is the entrance to another historic property, Ny Bakkegård, which is now hidden in the central courtyard of a perimeter block. It was owned by prime minister Carl Christian Hall from 1840 to 1881.

== Notable people ==
- Carl Christian Hall (1812–1888), politician, lived at No. 34 in 1850 – 1856 and again in 1860 – 1888.
- Johannes V. Jensen (1873–1950), author, lived on the 4th floor at No. 2C in 1923 – 1944.
