= Ny Bakkegård =

Country house in Copenhagen, Denmark

Coordinates: 55.6689°N 12.5316°E

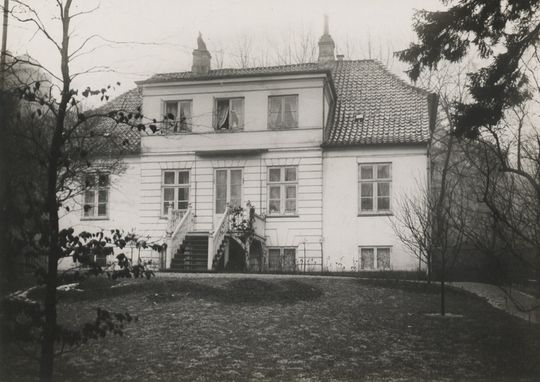
Ny Bakkegård in c. 1900

Ny Bakkegård (lit. "New Hill House") is a Neoclassical country house located at Rahbeks Allé in the Frederiksberg district of Copenhagen, Denmark. The current house was built by later prime minister Carl Christian Hall in 1840. It was originally surrounded by open countryside but has now been enclosed by a perimeter block. A statue of Hall is located in Søndermarken on the other side of Pile Allé.

== History ==
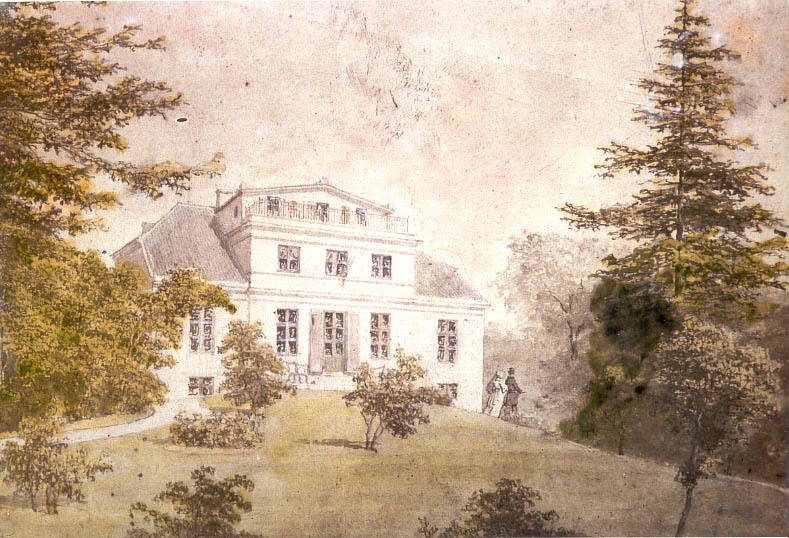
Ny Bakkegård in 1853

At the turn of the 19th century, the inn Bakkehuset was owned by Knud Engelbreth Langberg. In 1902 he constructed a new country house on the other side of the road and sold the old building to Knud Lyne Rahbæk who had lived regularly at the inn in the summer time since the 1780s. Engelbreth Langberg gave his new property the name Ny Bakkegård ("New Hill Farm") to distinguish it from Bakkegården ("The hill Farm") which from then on became known as Gammel Bakkegård ("Old Hill Farm") and would later be replaced by a new house by Carl Jacobsen.

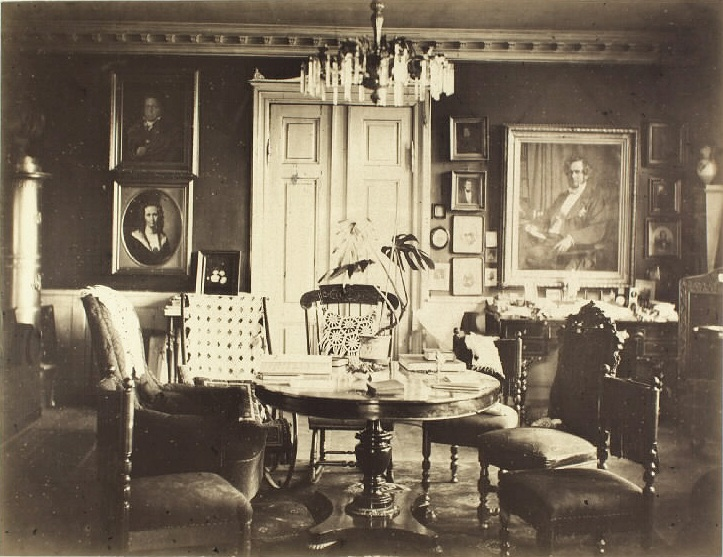
Interior from the 1880s

In 1940, the property was acquired by Carl Christian Hall who would later serve as Council President. He instantly replaced the old house with the current, Late Neoclassical building where he lived until his death in 1888. The house was the centre of an active social life with literary salons hosted by Halls wife, Augusta Marie Hall. The guests included Christian VIII and Queen Caroline Amalie, Adam Oehlenschläger, Anders Sandøe Ørsted, Hans Christian Ørsted, N.F.S. Grundtvig, Jacob Peter Mynster, Johan Ludvig Heiberg and Johanne Luise Heiberg.

== Today ==
The house was originally surrounded by open countryside but has now been enclosed by a perimeter block. It has been subject to significant alterations.

== See also ==
- List of historic houses in metropolitan Copenhagen
