= Sophie Ørsted =

Danish muse (1782–1818)

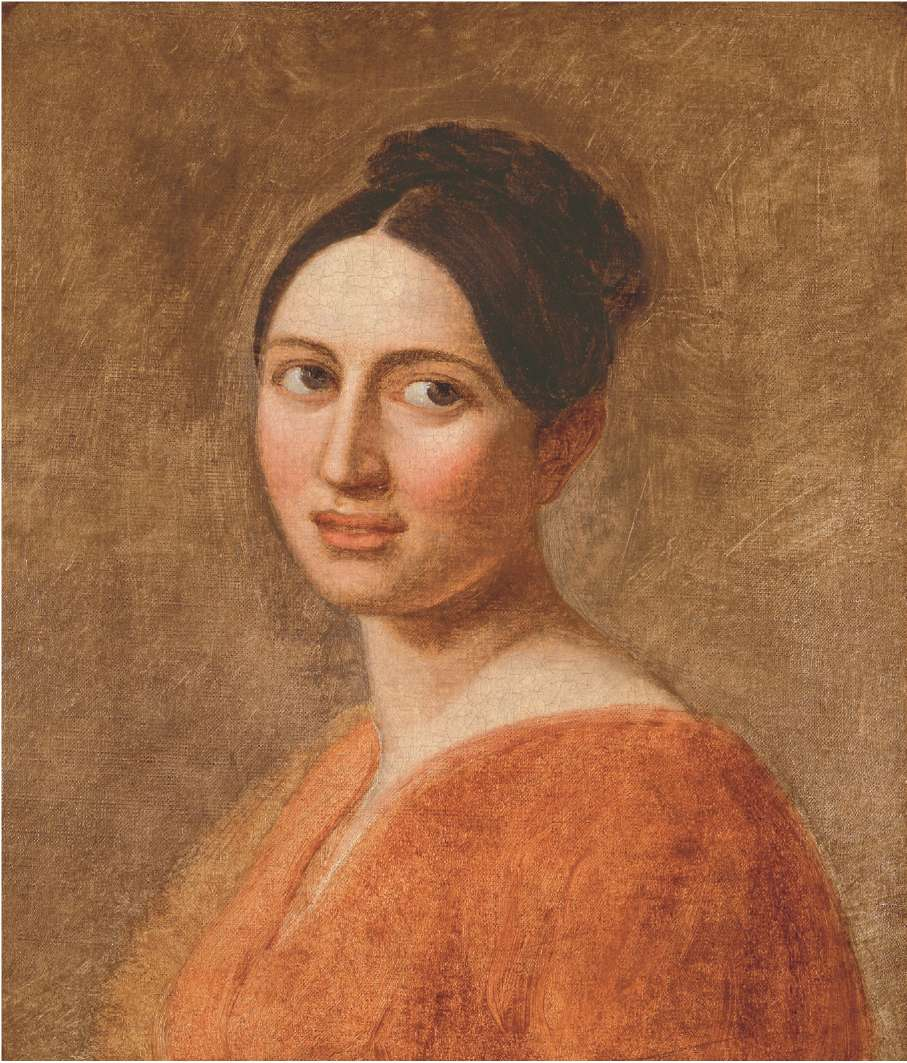
Sophie Ørsted by J.L. Lund (c. 1810)

Sophie Wilhelmine Bertha Ørsted (née Oehlenschläger; 16 July 1782 – 9 February 1818) was a Danish socialite and muse. Brought up in a literary environment in Copenhagen, she was the sister of writer Adam Oehlenschläger (1779–1850) and was married to jurist Anders Sandøe Ørsted (1778-1860). She became an inspiration for others, including the poet Jens Baggesen (1764–1826). She died of abdominal complications when she was only 35.

== Biography ==
Born in Frederiksberg Palace in the Copenhagen district of Frederiksberg, Sophie Wilhelmine Bertha Oehlenschläger was the daughter of the palace keeper and organist Joachim Conrad Oehlenschläger (1748–1827), who stemmed from the Duchy of Schleswig, and Martha Marie Hansen (1745–1800). She was brought up in the palace with her elder brother, the writer Adam Oehlenschläger who introduced romanticism into Danish literature. The two siblings benefited from the cultural interests of their father and the rather strict religious influence of their mother, participating in literature readings and play acting in both Danish and German while they were still young. They also enjoyed playing together in the extensive palace gardens. She had no formal education but her brother conveyed to her much of what he had learnt in school. When her mother died in 1800, it was she who took care of the household.

When he began to study, her brother introduced her to the Ørsted brothers; the physicist Hans Christian Ørsted (1777–1851) and Anders Sandøe Ørsted (1778–1860), a lawyer who later became prime minister. Widely recognized as a budding beauty, Sophie became engaged to Anders Ørsted in 1801 and they married on 10 July 1802. She spent a number of happy years with him in their small residence at Vestergade 22 in central Copenhagen, listening to the poetry her brother Adam had written for her and reading mainly German poetry herself. She maintained a close relationship with her brother-in-law as well as with the physician Ole Hieronymus Mynster (1772–1818) who served as chief physician at Frederiks Hospital in Copenhagen.

As a result of rather poor health and her inability to have children, Sophie Ørsted sought other distractions, especially during the lengthy absence of her husband who from 1805 to 1809 was away on a study trip. Thanks to her natural charm, she had no difficulty in encouraging young men to visit her, inviting them to replace her husband by reading contemporary literature to her, above all Goethe whom she particularly admired.

Among those who showed interest in her were the writer Andreas Christian Gierlew (1774–1845) and the entomologist Martin Christian Gottlieb Lehmann (1775–1856). In particular, she cultivated a relationship with the writer Jens Baggesen (1764–1826) who spent seven months living in her home from November 1806, as recorded in his diaries. When he left her to travel abroad, she wrote to him but her letters received no reply. He later dedicated other works to her but when he returned in 1811 she turned her back on him.

Thereafter, the philosopher Frederik Christian Sibbern (1785–1872) became a frequent visitor to Vestergade, falling hopelessly in love with Ørsted, as recounted in his Gabrielis Breve (Letters of Gabrielis). He read them to her in 1814 but first published them after her death in 1826. She showed great interest in Sibbern and shared her enthusiasm for Goethe with him in the letters she wrote when she was feeling well enough.

Sophie Ørsted died at 36 years of age in Copenhagen, after suffering from abdominal cancer. She is buried in Frederiksberg Cemetery.

== See also ==
- Kamma Rahbek
- Ida Brun
- Christine Stampe
