= Sorø Old Cemetery =

Cemetery in Denmark

Coordinates: 55°25′50″N 11°33′25″E

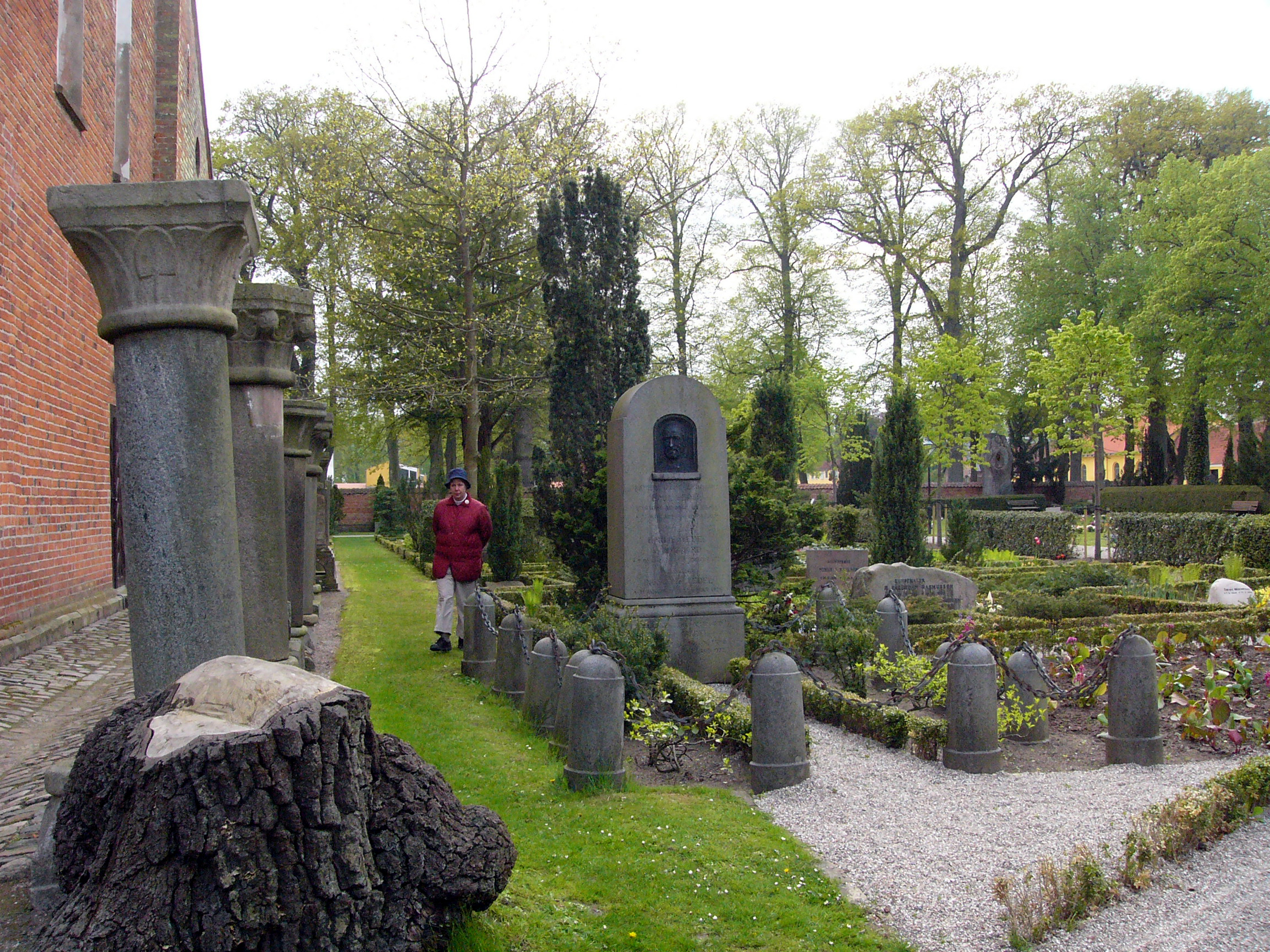
Sorø Old Cemetery.

Sorø Old Cemetery (Danish: Sorø Gamle Kirkegård), owned by Sorø Academy, is one of the oldest cemeteries still in use in Denmark.

== History ==
It opened in connection with the establishment of Sorø Abbey in the second half of the 12th century. The cemetery was expanded to four times its original size in the beginning of the 19th century. It was refurbished in 1940–1944.

== Burials ==
- Thøger Binneballe (1818–1900),architect active in Norway
- Jacob Hornemann Bredsdorff (1799–1841), polymath, natural scientist, linguist
- Bartholomæus Hoff (1840–1912), rector
- Bernhard Severin Ingemann
- Lucie Ingemann
- Carl Emil Kiellerup
- Frederik Martin
- Christian Molbech
- Carl Emil Mundt
- Siegfred Neuhaus (1879–1955), painter
- Hans Palludan Rasmussen
- Anna Sarauw
- Andreas Schytte
- Christian Ludvig Stemann
- Poul Hagerup Tregder
- Hans Ussing
- Henrik Ussing
- Palle Wodschow
