= DK Company =

Danish clothing company

- Company type: Private
- Industry: Fashion
- Founded: Ikast, Denmark, 2001
- Headquarters: Ikast, Denmark
- Number of locations: 450 retail stores in 35 countries
- Products: Clothing
- Revenue: 4.6 billion DKK
- Number of employees: 2,400
- Website: http://www.dkcompany.dk

DK Company is a clothing company based in Ikast, Denmark, with two additional divisions in Vejle and Copenhagen. Founded in 2001, DK Company has, with 2,400 employees and 450 retail stores, grown to become one of Europe's leading suppliers of fashion.

== History ==
DK Company was established in 2001 by Jens Poulsen. It maintains its own brand, Jasmin, and private label production for external fashion labels.

In 2012, DK Company acquired three divisions from BTX Group: the Young division (Blend, FQ1924, ICHI, Gestuz, and Blend She), the Modern division (Fransa, b.young, Dranella, and Veto), and the Modern division (Modern).

In 2014, DK Company acquired four brands from IC Group: InWear, Matinique, Part Two, and Soaked in Luxury.

In 2019, DK Company acquired the brands Saint Tropez, Solid and Tailored & Originals. Saint Tropez was integrated into the Copenhagen office, while Solid and Tailored & Originals were integrated into Vejle.

== Brands ==
DK Company covers 26 brands

- Atelier Rêve
- Blend
- BON'A PARTE
- b.young
- Casual Friday
- Cream
- Culture
- Fransa, and Fransa Plus Size
- FQ 1924
- Gestuz
- ICHI
- InWear
- KAFFE, and KAFFE curve
- Karen by Simonsen
- Lounge Nine
- Matinique
- My Essential Wardrobe
- Part Two
- Pulz Jeans
- Saint Tropez
- Soaked in Luxury
- Solid
- Sorbet
- Tailored Originals
- The Jogg Concept
