= Tiger of Sweden =

Clothing brand owned by Danish IC Group

Tiger of Sweden AB
- Company type: Subsidiary
- Industry: Fashion
- Founded: Uddevalla, Sweden (1903)
- Founder: Markus Schwarzmann; Hjalmar Nordström
- Headquarters: Stockholm, Sweden
- Key people: Linda Dauriz (CEO), Bryan Conway (Creative Director)
- Products: Clothing
- Parent: IC Group[1]
- Website: tigerofsweden.com

Tiger of Sweden is a clothing brand specialising in ready-to-wear fashion, footwear and accessories. Founded in 1903, the brand initially produced ready-to-wear men's suits. It now offers men's and women's fashion sold across Europe, North America and South Africa.

== History ==
Founded in Uddevalla, Sweden in 1903 by Marcus Schwarzman and Hjalmar Nordström, the brand was first known as Schwarzman & Nordström. The brand founders introduced the ready-to-wear suit to common people in Sweden.

In the 1920s, the brand introduced a suit range called “Tiger”, which became so popular that the brand was later renamed Tiger of Sweden. The brand became northern Europe's largest fashion brand in the 1930s and produced over 140,000 suits a year. Tiger of Sweden expanded internationally in the 1960s, entering both the UK and the US market. After years of successful growth, the brand launched its first womenswear collection during the 90s.

In 2019, Linda Dauriz was assigned as the brand's new CEO, and at the beginning of 2020, Tiger of Sweden appointed Bryan Conway as design director. Today Conway operates as the brand's creative director.

== Products ==
Tiger of Sweden offers ready-to-wear fashion, footwear and accessories for men and women. The brand designs in the Stockholm studio and releases four collections per year.

In 2021, Tiger of Sweden launched its first unisex suit during London Fashion Week, made from more sustainable materials, trims and dyeing techniques.

== Stores ==
Tiger of Sweden products are currently available in over 10,000 locations in Europe, North America and South Africa and has flagship stores in Stockholm, Copenhagen, Montreal, London, Paris and Berlin.
