= Thøger Binneballe =

Danish architect

- Born: 1 July 1818; Copenhagen, Denmark
- Died: 9 December 1900 (aged 82); Sorø, Denmark
- Occupation: Architect

Thøger Binneballe (1 July 1818 – 9 December 1900) was a Danish architect and master builder active in Norway.

== Early life and education ==
Binneballe was born on 1 July 1818 in Copenhagen. He trained as an architect before moving to Norway in the late 1830s.

== Career ==
Bindeballe moved to Norway in the late 1830s where he settled as a master builder in Christiania (now Oslo). He constructed several prominent buildings, including Oscarshall, the Storting building and several buildings for Rikshospitalet in Pilestredet.

Many of the buildings that he constructed were built to his own design. These included Karl Johans gate 39 (1844), the first four-storey building in the city. He also designed the building at Kirkegata 6 (1856) and a residence for a bank manager with the city's first private WC.

He was active is Association of Craftsmen in Copenhagen and became its first honorary member in 1886. He sat on several boards and commissions.

== Personal life ==
Late in his life Binneballe returned to Denmark, where he settled in Sorø. He is buried at Sorø Old Cemetery.

== Image gallery ==
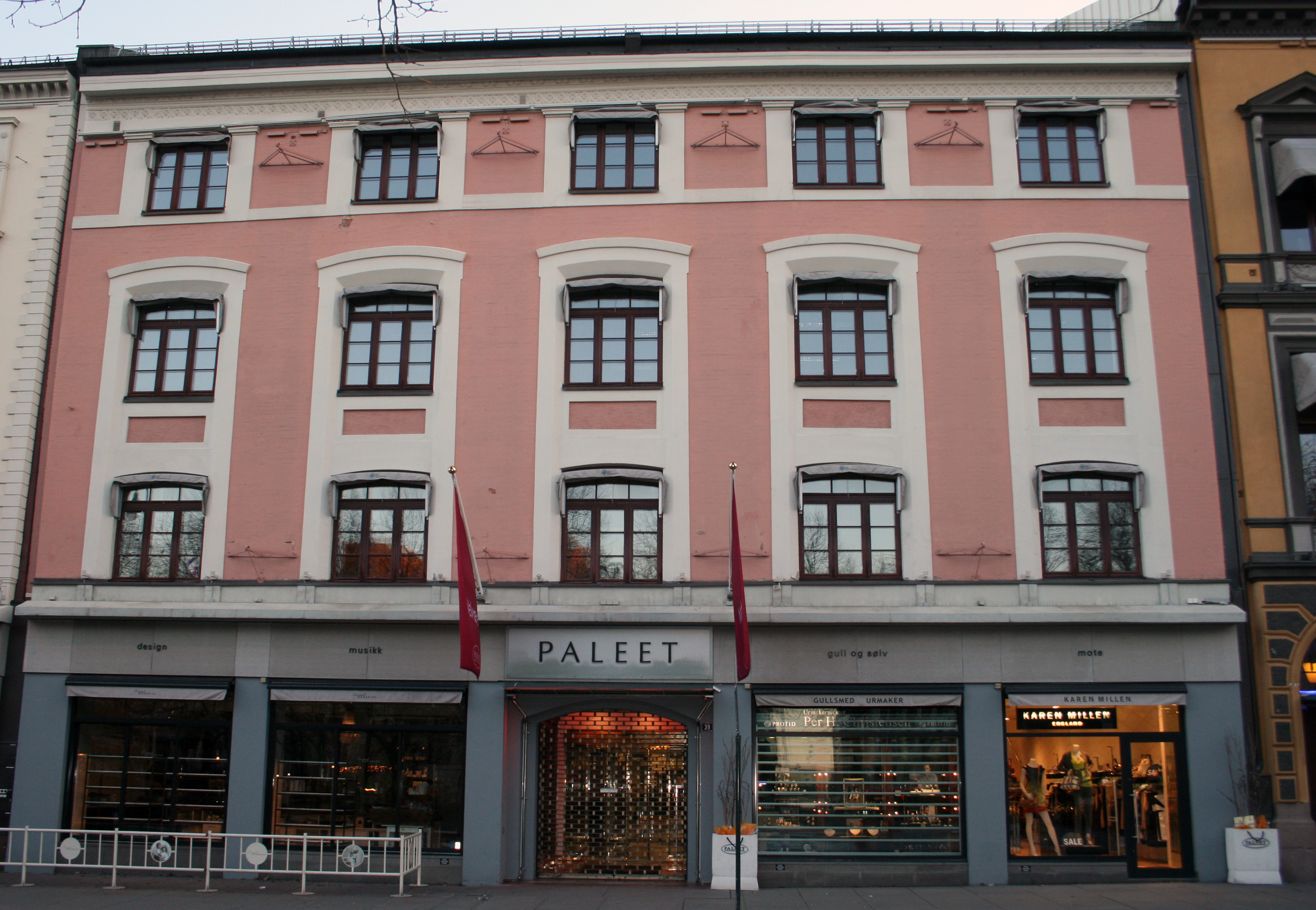
Karl Johans gate 39

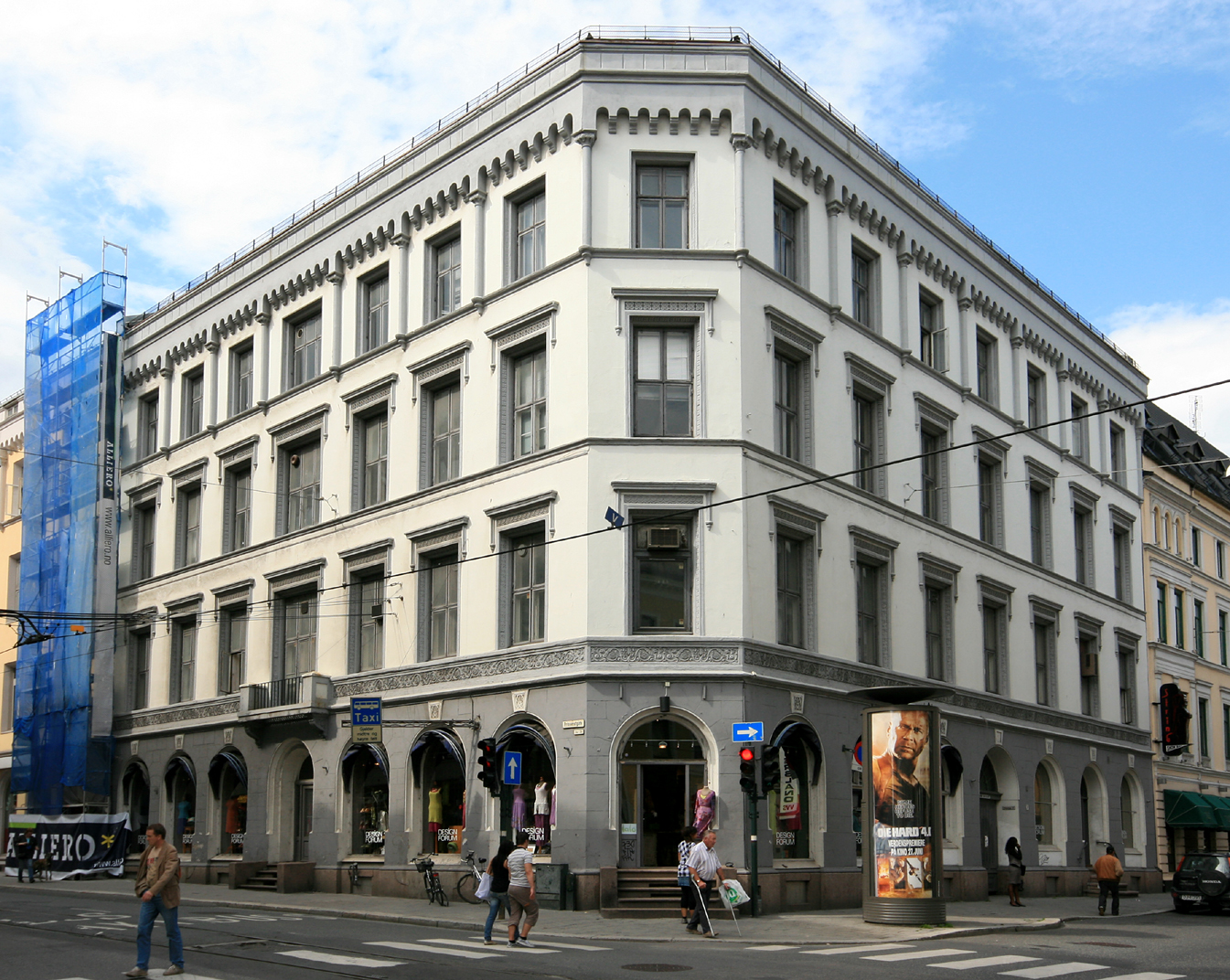
Prinsens gate 3b

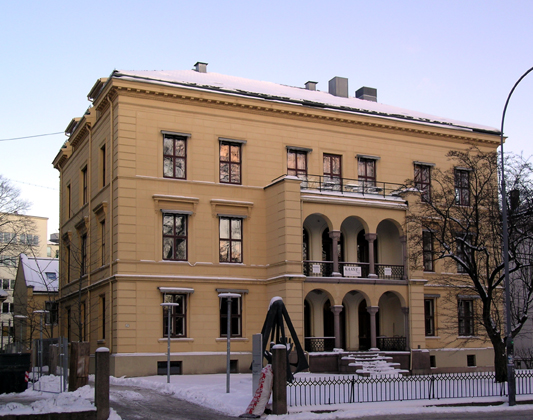
Wergelandsveien 27

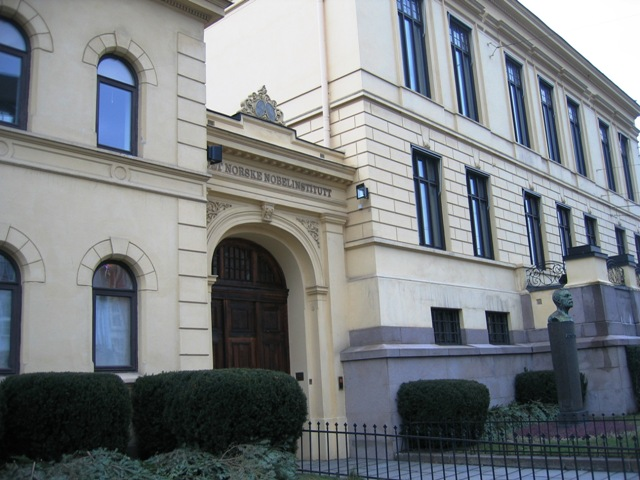
Nobelinstituttet
