= Fisketorvet =

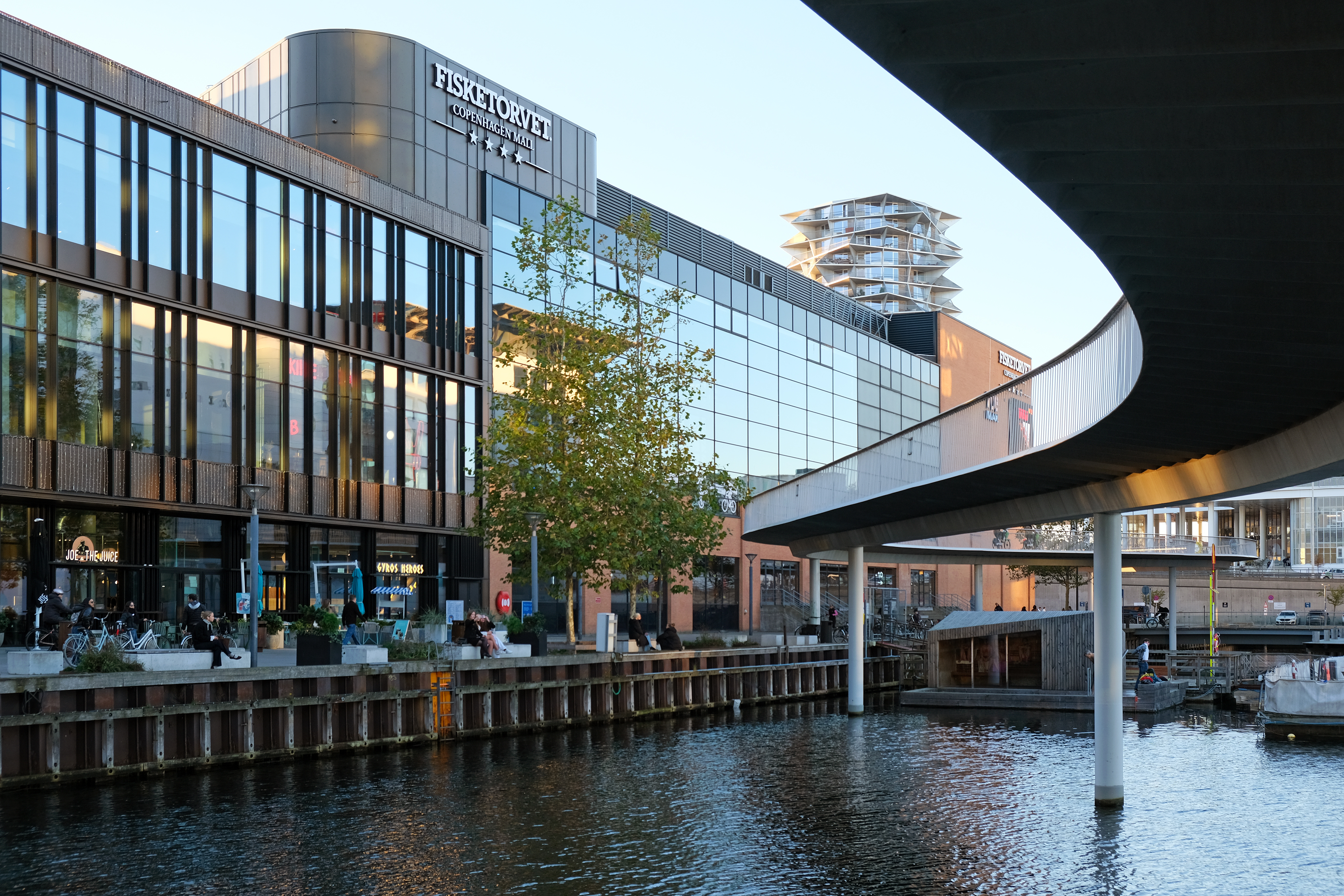
- Fisketorvet seen from Havneholmen
- Location: Vesterbro, Copenhagen, Denmark
- Coordinates: 55.6620°N 12.5615°E
- Opened: 10 October 2000
- Owner: Unibail-Rodamco-Westfield
- Architect: Kiehlers Architects
- Num. of stores: c. 120
- Floor area: 58,000 m^{2} (620,000 sq ft)
- Floors: 4
- Parking: 200+ spaces
- Website: fisketorvet.dk/W/do/centre

Fisketorvet - Copenhagen Mall is a shopping centre located on Kalvebod Brygge waterfront in Copenhagen, Denmark. It is Denmark's third largest shopping center by size.

Fisketorvet - Copenhagen Mall regularly hosts events for the guests such as:

- Fastelavn (a Danish Carnival)
- Copenhagen Cooking & Food Festival
- Holiday tickets

The centre is located at Fisketorvet Dybbølsbro station next to the harbour.

== History ==
The shopping centre takes its name after Copenhagen's old fish market which was located at the site from 1958 until 1999 when it moved to new premises in the North Harbour. The shopping centre was designed by Kiehlers Architects (Carl Gustaf Åkerström) and opened on 10 October 2000. It is owned by Unibail-Rodamco.

== Facilities ==
Fisketorvet has a floor area of 58,000 square metres with 120 stores, making it Denmark's third largest shopping centre. It also contains 15 restaurants and cafés as well as a CinemaxX cinema with 14 screens and IMAX.

Stores include:

Store type	Name
Jewelry	Carat Diamanter; Pandora
Home goods	Bahne
Electronics	Humac, Elgiganten
Clothing	H&M; Zara; Uniqlo; Selected; Superdry™ Creme Fraiche; Levi’s; Mantra; CapStore; Dressmann; Lagazelle; Tøjeksperten
Shoes	ECCO; Foot Locker; Paw Sko
Toys	BR
Luxury fashion houses	Saint Tropez
Fast food	McDonald's, Letz Sushi, Sunset Boulevard
Cell phones	Telia, Telenor, YouSee
Bags and accessories	Neye
Building materials	Silvan
Crafts	Panduro Hobby
Supermarket	Føtex, Lidl
Coffee shop	Baresso, Starbucks, Cyprus, Dalle Valle
Beauty supply	The Body Shop
Candies	Kiosk Bien
Sporting Goods	Sportmaster, Sport 24
Video Games	GameStop
Children's Furniture	Flexa
Everything for kids	ØnskeBørn
Drugs	Matas
Books	Bog & idé
