= Vestergade 22 =

Building in Copenhagen, Denmark

Coordinates: 55°40′38″N 12°34′09″E

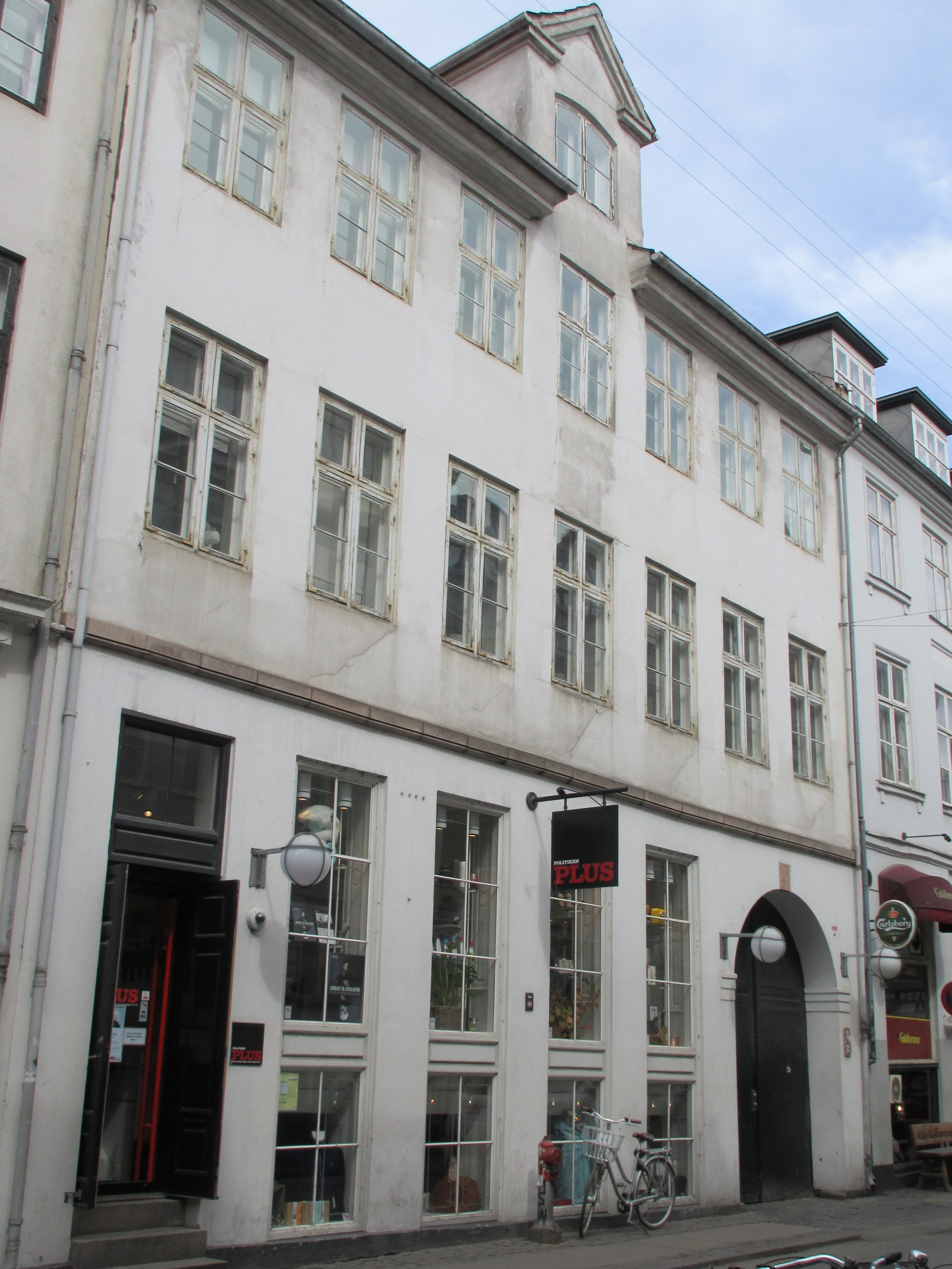
Vestergade 22

Vestergade 22 is a Neoclassical property in the Latin Quarter of Copenhagen, Denmark. The building is now part of the Politiken Hus complex. A commemorative plaque mounted on the wall of the gateway summarizes the history of the property, including the fact that Anders Sandøe Ørsted and his wife Sophie lived in the apartment on the first floor from 1805 to 1813. The building was listed on the Danish registry of protected buildings and places in 1959.

== History ==
=== 18th century ===
The previous building at the site was constructed after the Copenhagen Fire of 1728. The building was for many years owned by dyers and was therefore known as Farvergården (the Dyer's House). The owner would typically live in one of the apartments in the building fronting the street and run his dyeing business from one of the side wings. An inn also known as Farvergården opened in the other side wing.

=== 19th century ===
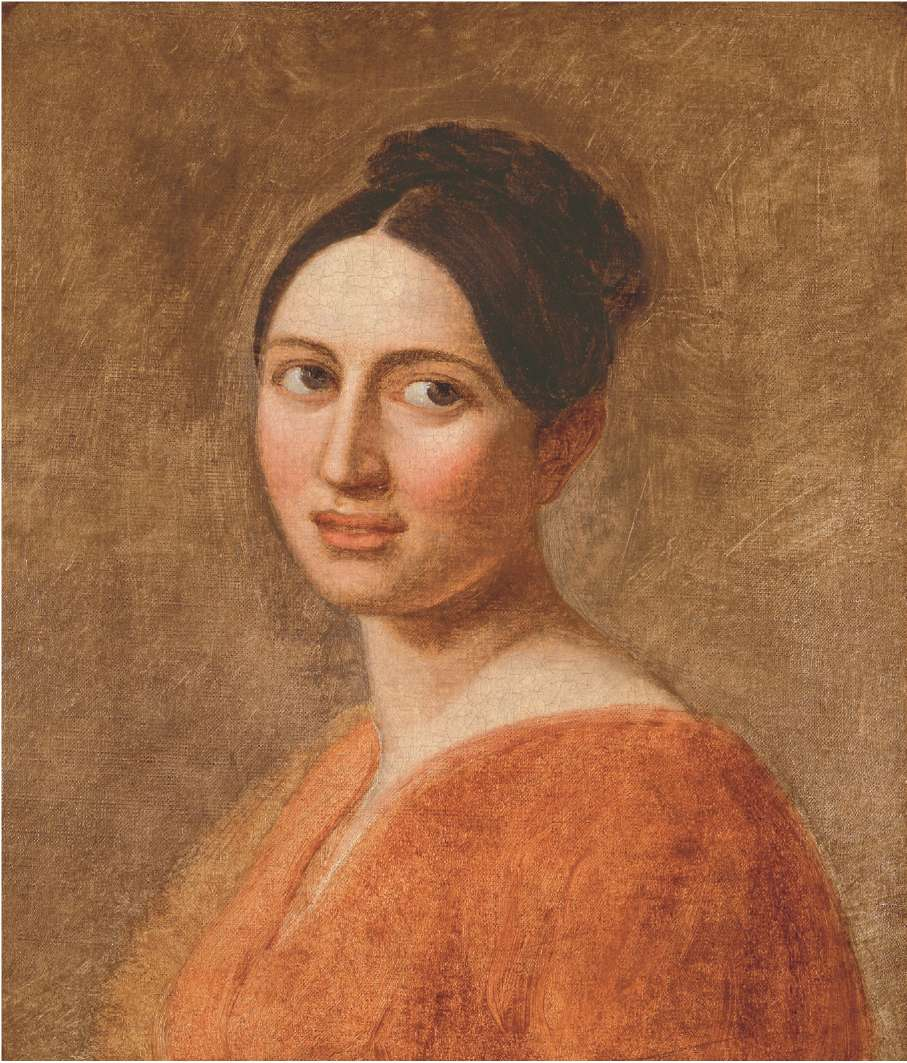
Sophie Ørsted, c. 1810

The property was at some point acquired by dyer Lars Bjørn.

The building was together with most of the other buildings in the area destroyed in the Copenhagen Fire of 1795.

The current building at the site was constructed for Bjørn in 1798–1799. It was later sold to master dyer Johann Pohlmann. The dyer's plant, the inn Farvergården and a grocer's shop was still operated from the premises. When Pohlmann retired, he sold the property to G. L. Fogh but continued to live in one of the apartments.

The young jurist Anders Sandøe Ørsted and his wife Sophie Ørsted, a sister of Adam Oehlenschläger, lived in the apartment on the first floor from 1805. The couple was part of the city's cultural elite, and their home in Vestergade played host to literary salons. Oehlenschläger's first great historical tragedy, Haakon Jrl, was read aloud at the first time at a private party in the Ørsted couple's home on 9 March by the actor Michael Rosing. Oehlenschläger, who was traveling Europe at the time, had sent the manuscript home to Anders Sandøe Ørsted's brother Hans Christian Ørsted. The guest list comprised Oehlenschläger's fiancé Christiane Heger, her sister Kamma Rahbek, their brother Carl Heger, their father Hans Heger,, Reinholdine Schönheyder and Albertine Bull.

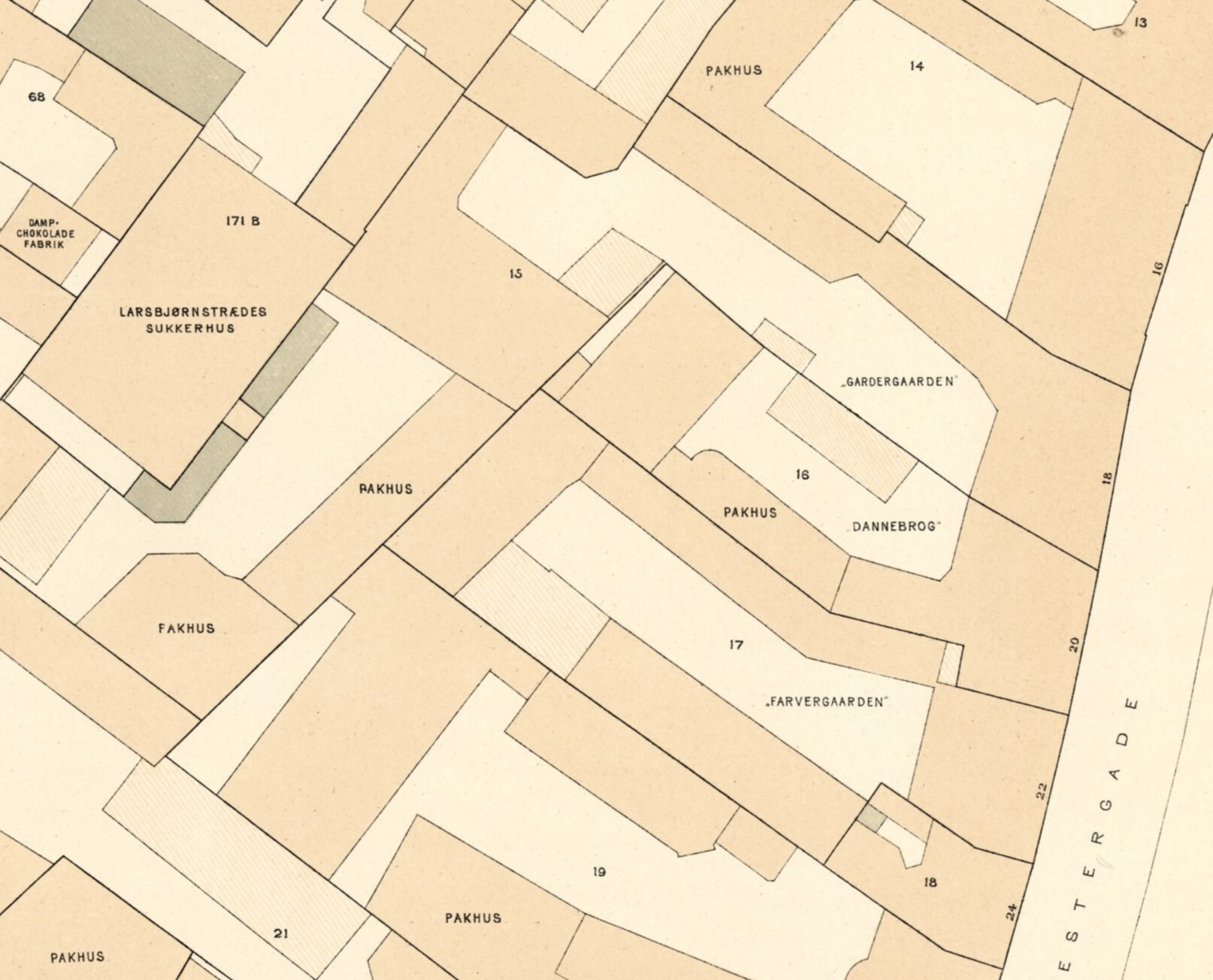
The property, seen in one of Berggreen's block plans of Northern Quarter, 1886–1888

On Fog's retirement in c. 1858, Farvergården was sold to dyer and printer H. N. Grundtvig.

The complex was later sold to two brothers named Baumgarten, whose printing business Johan Ludvig Sivertsens Bog- og Stentrykkeri (founded 1849) was then based in the side wing. In the 1890s, one of the Baumgarten brothers took over the apartment on the third floor.

=== 20th century ===
In 1900, Vestergade 22 was acquired by the hardware wholesaler Bucka & Nissen. The company had been founded by Marcus Bucka (died 1894) and Hans Nissen (d. 1902) in Flensburg, but moved to Copenhagen as a result of Denmark's loss of Schlesvig-Holstein in 1864. From 1884 it was based in the side wing of No. 26, and later also took over No. 24.

In 1861, Bucka & Nissen moved out of the city centre. Vestergade 22–26 was then sold to the newspaper publisher Politikens Hus. The company's book publisher, Politikens Forlag, was from then on based at No. 22. The building was renovated in 1967.

== Architecture ==
The building is seven bays wide, and the facade is tipped by a gabled dormer.
