= IC Group =

Danish clothing company

- Company type: Limited company
- Industry: Fashion
- Founded: 2001
- Headquarters: Copenhagen, Denmark
- Key people: Mads Ryder (CEO)
- Products: Clothing
- Revenue: DKK 2.5 billion (2013/14)
- Net income: DKK 221 million (2013/14)
- Website: www.icgroup.net

IC Group is a clothing company based in Copenhagen, Denmark.

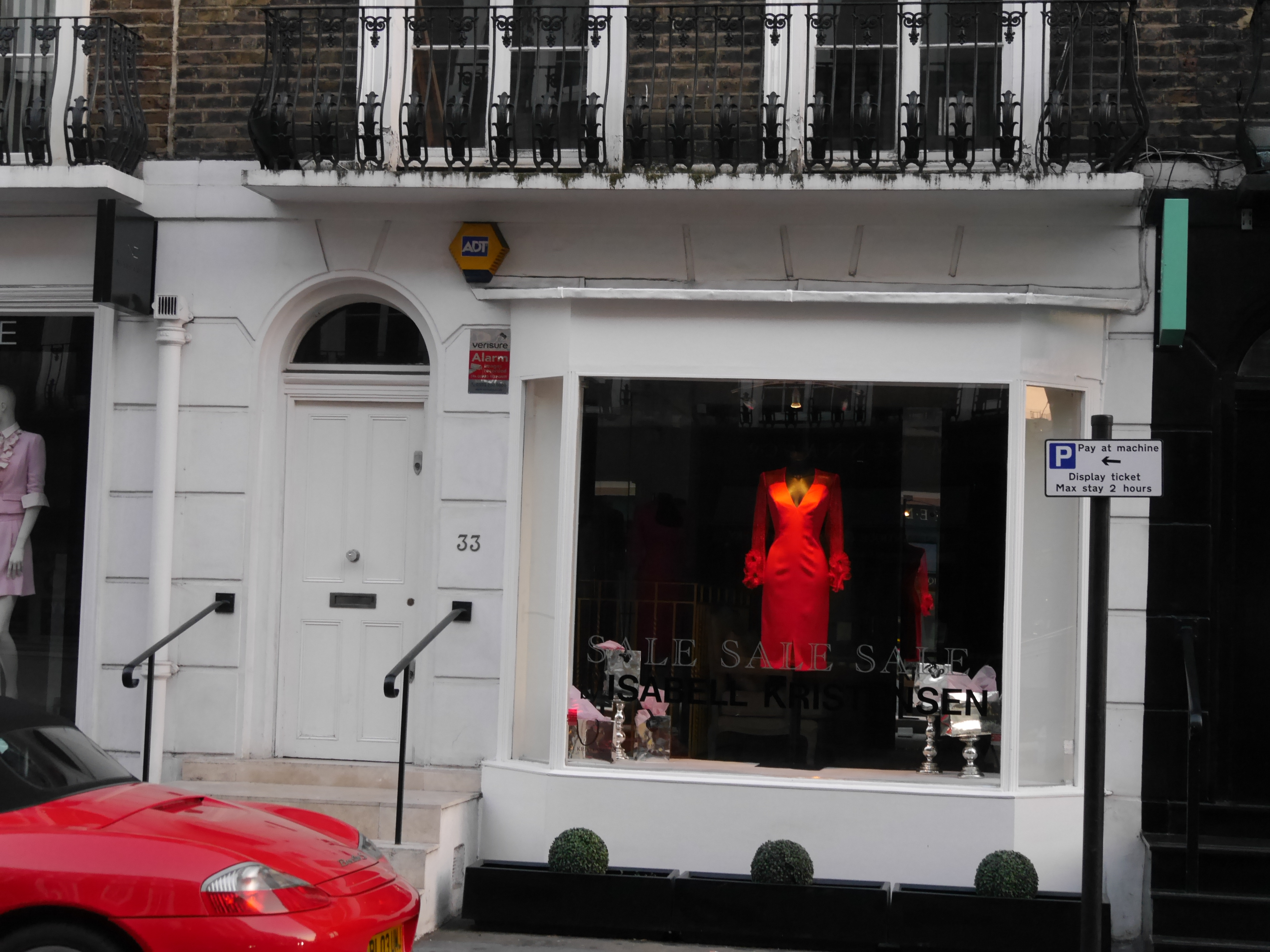
Isabell Kristensen store, 33 Beauchamp Place, London (2016)

== History ==
IC Group was founded as IC Companys in 2001 through the merger of InWear Group A/S and Carli Gry International A/S. InWear had been founded by Niels Martinsen in 1973. Carli Gry traced its history back to 1940 when Jørgen and Carli Gry opened a small shop in Copenhagen. In 1973, the company launched the clothing brand Jackpot. In 2002, IC Group acquired the brand Saint Tropez and launched the brands O by Isabell Kristensen (since 2006: Soaked in Luxury) and Designers Remix Collection. In 2003, the company acquired the brand Tiger of Sweden and launched the brand By Malene Birger as a joint-venture with the designer Malene Birger. In 2013, IC Group sold its two brands Jackpot and Cottonfield to Coop Danmark. InWear, Matinique, Part Two and Soaked in Luxury were sold in 2014 to DK Company. The company subsequently changed its name to IC Group. In June 2018, Peak Performance was sold to Amer Sports Corporation In January 2019, the IC Group announced it will be selling its Saint Tropez fashion brand to DK Company.

In May 2019, it was announced that Friheden Invest A/S, IC's main shareholder, had decided to submit an offer to purchase all company shares and therefore to take the company private. This decision comes shortly after another IC investor, Nordea Funds Ltd, cut its holding to zero.

In June 2019, the IC Group announced it will be initiating organizational changes and store closures at their Tiger of Sweden brand. The company noted that these cost-cutting measures will lead to non-recurring costs of 10 million Danish crone for the 2018/19 financial year.

== Brands ==
- By Malene Birger
- Designers Remix
- Tiger of Sweden
