= Kamma Rahbek =

Danish writer and salonist (1775–1829)

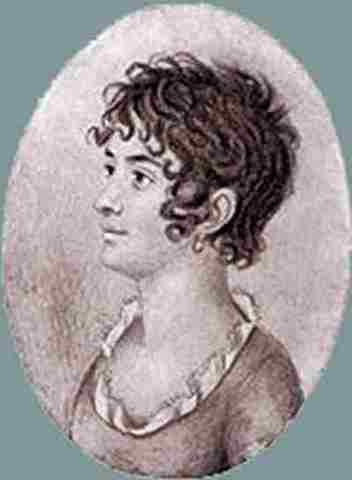
- Born: 19 October 1775; Copenhagen, Denmark
- Died: 21 January 1829 (aged 53); Copenhagen, Denmark
- Resting place: Frederiksberg Ældre Kirkegård, Copenhagen
- Occupations: Writer; lady of letters
- Known for: Salons
- Spouse: Knud Lyne Rahbek (m. 1798)
- Relatives: Adam Oehlenschläger (brother-in-law)

Karen Margrethe "Kamma" Rahbek (née Heger; 19 October 1775 – 21 January 1829) was a Danish writer, salonist and lady of letters.

== Biography ==
Karen Margrethe Rahbek was born in Copenhagen, Denmark. She was the daughter of the official Hans Heger (1747–1819) and Anne Louise Drewsen (1751–1799). She grew up in a wealthy home in Nørregade. She received a broad education and could speak several languages, including German, French, Spanish, Latin, Greek and Italian. She translated Homer and learned the piano. Her drawing lessons had been delivered by Bertel Thorvalsen, who became a noted Danish-Icelandic sculptor.

In 1798, she married Knud Lyne Rahbek (1760–1830), a writer, poet, literary historian and magazine editor.

Her salon at Bakkehuset became a cultural centre and the gathering place for the writers of the Danish Golden Age. It was considered the salon of the middle class, in contrast to those of the more aristocratic Friederike Brun and Charlotte Schimmelmann.

Among her guests were the romanticist poet and playwright Adam Gottlob Oehlenschläger, who was married to her sister Christiane (1782–1841). Other notable visitors included the poet Jens Baggesen, the muse Sophie Ørsted, the poet Poul Martin Møller, the theologian N. F. S. Grundtvig, the novelist B. S. Ingemann, the writer H. C. Andersen, the archaeologist Peter Oluf Brøndsted and the poet Johan Ludvig Heiberg. Rahbek befriended the writers of the Romantic style, while her spouse preferred the moralists.

Rahbek was also a diligent writer. Several of her letters and memories have been published. At the time, it was the fashion to write letters to friends even though one saw them several times a week, with the letters intended to be shared. Her regular correspondents included the Bishop of Zealand Jacob Peter Mynster, the novelist Christian Pram, Adolph Engelbert Boye (1784 - 1851) and the poet and librarian Christian Molbech. Mynster provided advice on her faith, whereas Molbech became too needy and she ended the correspondence.

Rahbek died in 1829 at Frederiksberg and was buried in Frederiksberg Ældre Kirkegård.

== In popular culture ==
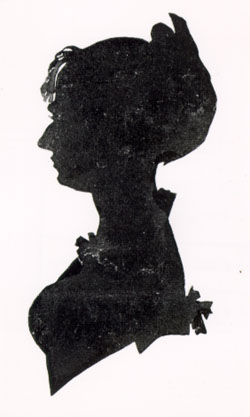
Silhouette of Kamma Rahbek

- Kamma Rahbek (Karen Lykkehus) appears in Jeg har elsket og levet, a 1940 romantic musical about the composer C. E. F. Weyse directed by George Schnéevoigt.
- She is the subject Kamma, a 2011 biographical novel by Maria Helleberg.
- Her silhouette is used as the logo for Wikipedia's Women in Red initiative.

== See also ==
- Sophia Magdalena Krag Juel Vind

== Other sources ==
- Knud Lyne Rahbek: Erindringer af mit liv (Copenhagen: Jens Hostrup Schultz) 5 volumes published between 1824-29

== Related reading ==
- Kirsten Dreyer (ed.) Kamma Rahbeks brevveksling med Chr. Molbech, 1–3 (Museum Tusculanums Forlag) 1994. ISBN 978-87-7289-245-0
- Maria Helleberg: Vilde kvinder, milde kvinder : 12 kvindeliv fra guldalderen (Lindhardt og Ringhof) 2003. ISBN 978-87-638-0344-1
- Anne E. Jensen: Kamma Rahbek 1775–1828. I anledning af 200 års dagen den 19. oktober 1975 (Bakkehusmuseet by Historisk-Topografisk Selskab for Frederiksberg) 1975
- Hans Kyrre, Knud Lyne Rahbek og Kamma Rahbek og Livet paa Bakkehuset (H. Hagerups Forlag) 1929.
- Anne Scott Sørensen, "Blomsterpoesi – om Kamma Rahbek og Bakkehuset" in Nordisk salonkultur – et studie i nordiske skønånder og salonmiljøer 1780–1850, Anne Scott Sørensen (ed.) (Odense Universitetsforlag) 1998. ISBN 87-7838-345-5.
