= Malene Birger =

Danish fashion designer

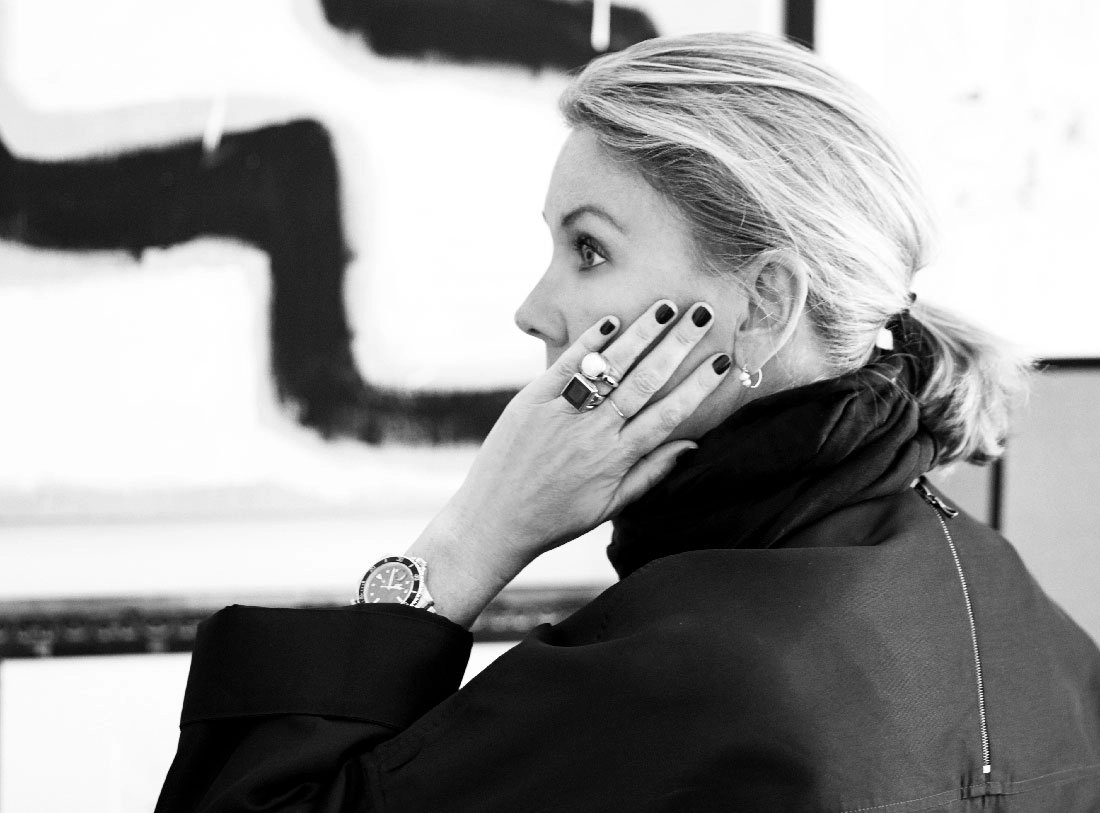
- Born: 1 December 1962 (age 63)
- Label: By Malene Birger

Malene Birger (born 1 December 1962) is a Danish fashion designer. She co-founded Day Birger et Mikkelsen in 1997 and By Malene Birger in 2003.

== Career ==
Birger graduated from the Danish Design School in 1989. She began her career in the fashion industry in 1989 as designer at Jackpot by Carli Gry. She was also the head designer of women's wear at Marc O'Polo in Stockholm.

In 1997, Birger co-founded the company Day Birger et Mikkelsen. She was the creative director of the company until leaving it in 2002. In 2003, she founded By Malene Birger in collaboration with IC Group. In 2010, Birger sold her share of the company to IC Group. She left the position as creative director in January 2014 and now runs the interior design company Birger1962.

In 2015 she founded the eponymous design consultancy Malene Birger's World. And she has recently launched a small jewellery collection GOLD&ME. In later years she has also become a successful artist creating art prints which are recognized by black and white abstract brush strokes forming shapes.

== Personal life ==
Birger lives in Mallorca. She is a Danish UNICEF ambassador. Four times a year she designed shirts and string bags to sell in order to raise a profit that can be donated to UNICEF.

== Awards ==
In the year of 2002, Birger won the Danish Design Award. She received Guldknappen in the year of 2004 from the Danish fashion magazine Alt for Damerne. In the year of 2005, she received the Scandinavian Design Award. In the year of 2008, Birger won brand of the year by Costume Norway.
