= Bakkehuset =

Coordinates: 55°40′06″N 12°31′55″E

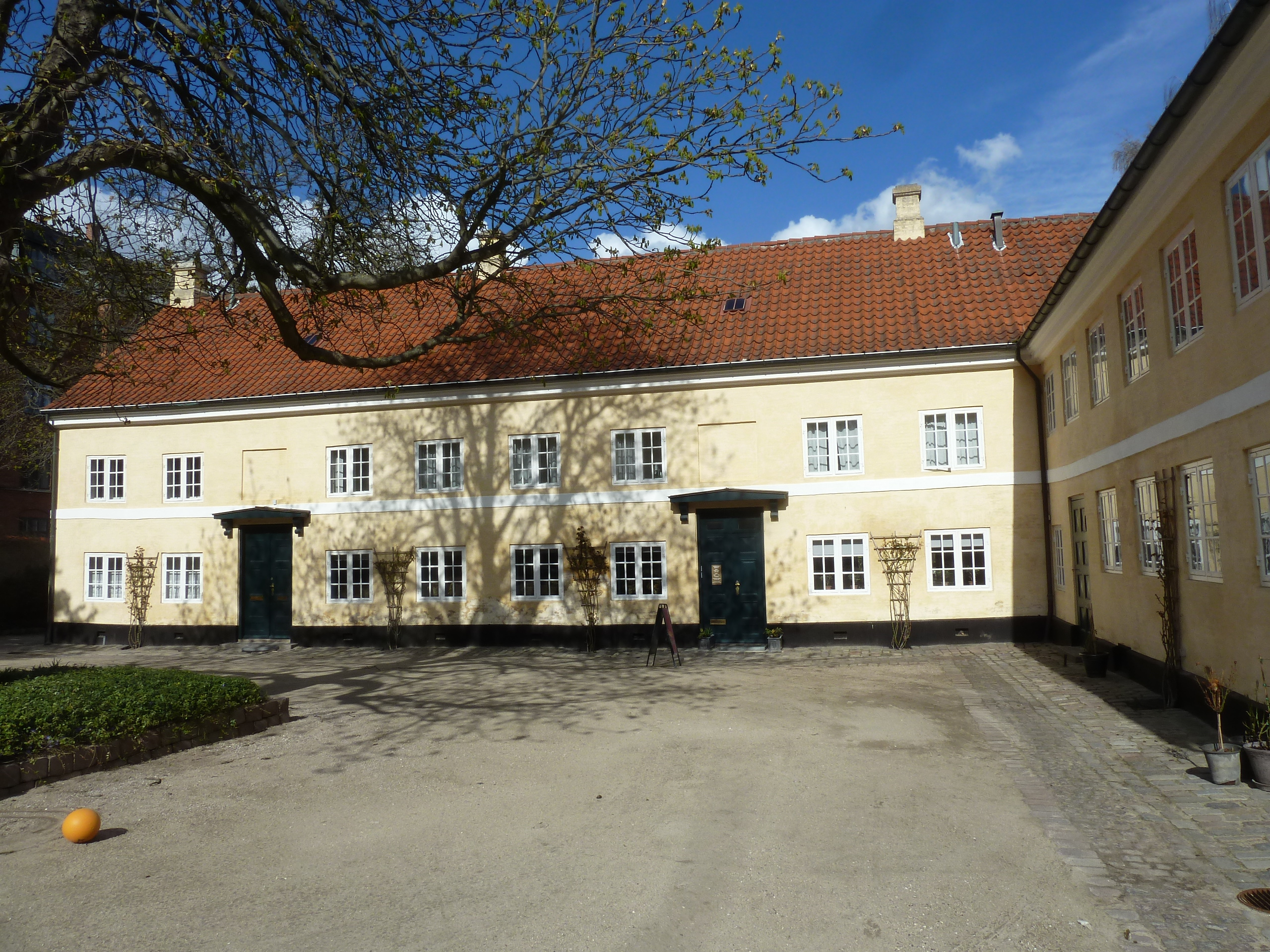
- Bakkehuset viewed from the courtyard
- Interactive map of the Bakkehuset area

General information
- Architectural style: Vernacular
- Location: Frederiksberg, Copenhagen, Denmark
- Completed: 1520s

Bakkehuset (lit. 'The Hill House') is a historic house museum on Rahbeks Allé in the Frederiksberg district of Copenhagen, Denmark. Dating from the 1520s, it has served a number of functions over the years, including as a farmhouse, inn, private home, psychiatric hospital and orphanage. It is particularly associated with the Danish Golden Age when it was owned by Knud Lyne Rahbek and his wife, Kamma Rahbek, used it as a venue for her salons.

== History ==
=== Early history ===
Bakkehuset can be traced back to the 1520s. Strategically located on the main road from Copenhagen to Roskilde, it long served as an inn. When Claus Wendorff died in 1649, his widow unsuccessfully tried to get an extension of the license to operate the inn.

A new owner, captain Claus Wendorff, obtained a new license in 1755. Former prime minister Count Johan Ludvig Holstein acquired the property in 1756. The land was conviently situated close to Frederiksberg Palace and his intention was to build a new country house at the site but the plans had still now been carried out when he died in 1763. Instead the property was taken over by his building master, Johan Christian Conradi, who completed his refurbishment of the property which still served as an inn the year after. When Conradi went bankrupt in 1777 the estate once again changed owners. Knud Lyne Rahbek was a permanent guest from 1787 until 1802 when he acquired the property and made it his private home.

=== The Rahbek years ===
==== Cultural venue ====
After the Rahbek's took over Bakkehuset, it quickly became a popular social venue for the city's literary and intellectual establishment. Among the many regular visitors were Adam Oehlenschläger, who was married to Kamma's sister Christina, Anders Sandøe Ørsted, who was married to Oehlenschläger's sister Sofie, Hans Christian Andersen, Jens Baggesen, Jens Collin, Rahbek's fellow director at the Royal Theatre—Poul Martin Møller, Bishop Mynster and Bernhard Severin Ingemann.

The maintenance of a busy social life was expensive and neither Rahbek, nor Kamma had much means to make do with. They rented out rooms to supplement their incomes, and Kamma managed to make the most out of their meagre means.

Later the house has served as a summer residence for people such as Johan Ludvig Heiberg, Johanne Luise Heiberg and N. F. S. Grundtvig.

==== Kamma's garden ====
The Bakkehuset estate included 3.5 hectares of land. Kamma enthustically, almost scientifically, established a garden with a small pond, lawns, flowers and many rare plants on the premises. It was one of the first private English style gardens to be laid out in Denmark.

=== Later history ===
One of the originally three wings was allowed to fall into despair and was ultimately demolished. For a while the building was used as a psychiatric hospital before it moved to Ebberødgård outside Birkerød. The museum at Bakkehuset opened in 1925.

== Bakkehuset today ==
The museum consists of a series of memorial rooms dedicated to some of the notabilities who have lived in the building over the years.

The building is located next to the Carlsberg area, the former industrial site of the Carlsberg Breweries, which is now under redevelopment into a new dense district in Copenhagen. A small park will be located next to the museum.

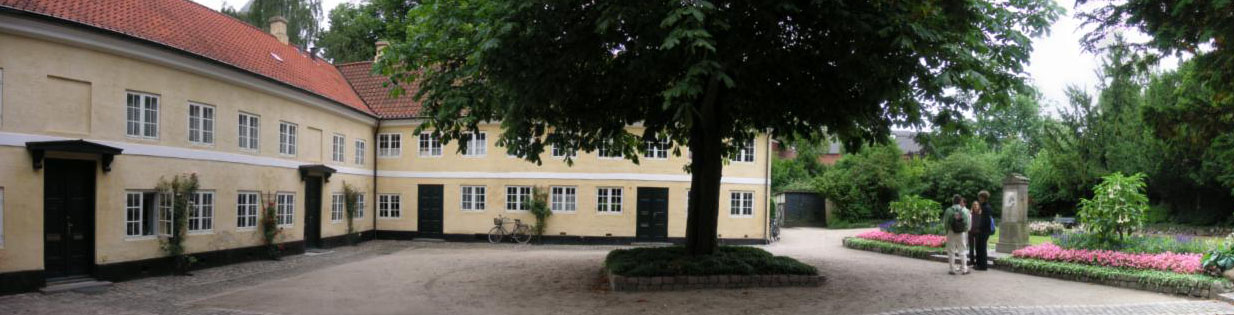
Bakkehuset panorama

== See also ==
- Store Godthåb
