= Knud Lyne Rahbek =

Danish literary historian, critic, writer, poet and magazine editor (1760–1830)

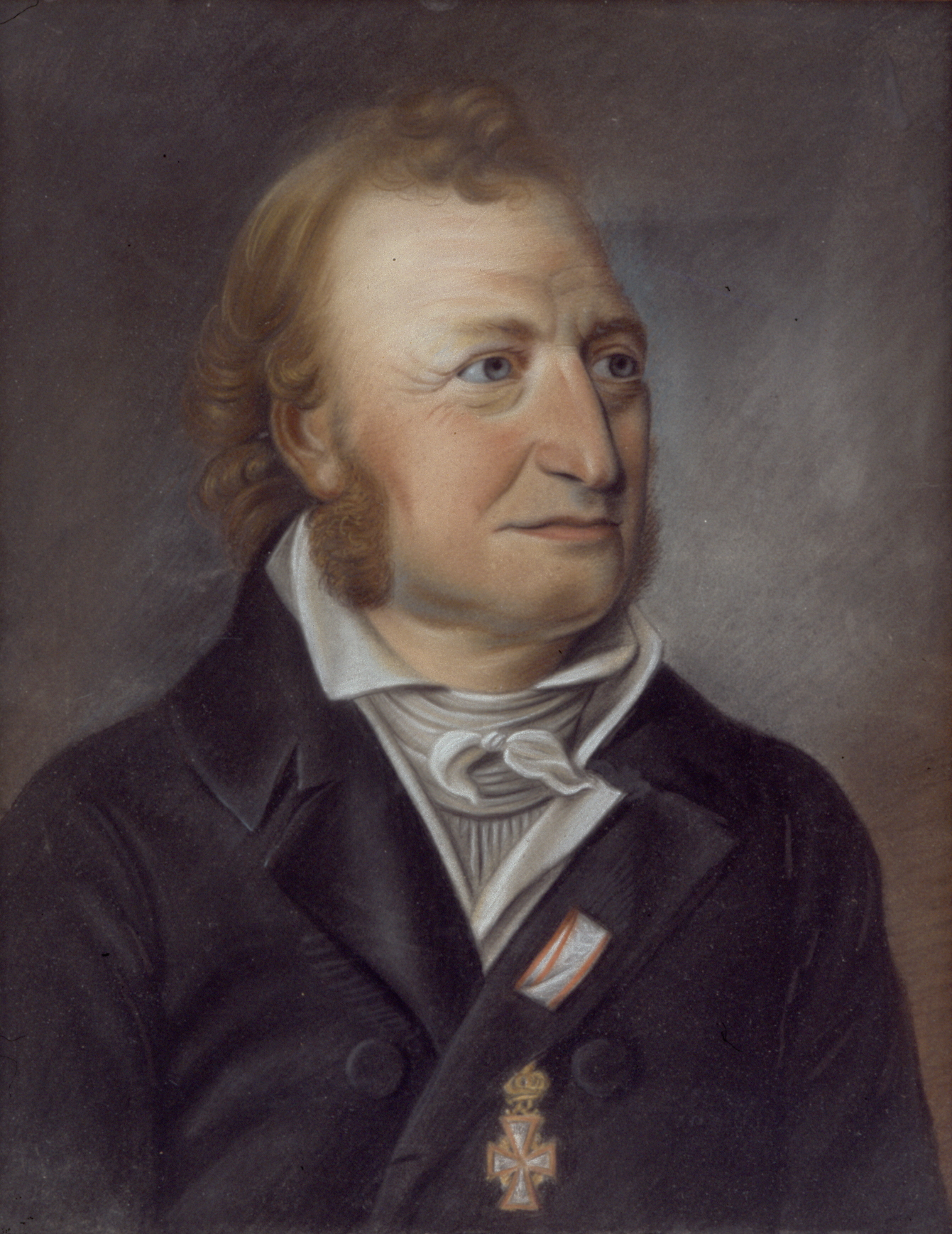
- Portrait of Rahbek made in 1815
- Born: December 18, 1760; Copenhagen, Denmark
- Died: April 22, 1830 (aged 69); Copenhagen, Denmark
- Resting place: Frederiksberg Ældre Kirkegård, Copenhagen
- Occupations: Professor; literature historian; critic; poet; editor
- Employer: University of Copenhagen
- Spouse: Kamma Heger (m. 1798; died 1829)
- Relatives: Adam Oehlenschläger (brother-in-law)

Knud Lyne Rahbek (18 December 1760 – 22 April 1830) was a Danish literary historian, critic, writer, poet and magazine editor.

He was the son of customs inspector Jacob Rahbek (1728–1795) and his wife Johanne (née Riis; 1731–1761). He became a professor at University of Copenhagen, and was its rector from 1826-1827. He was also a member of the Royal Danish Theatre's board.

== Biography ==
Knud Lyne Rahbek was the son of clergyman Jacob Rahbek. He had always wanted to become an actor. In his youth he tried out as an actor at the Royal Danish Theatre, but because of his appearance he was not selected.

Instead he turned to the role of a writer. He started out as a playwright, writing a series of semi-successful plays most notably the play The Young Darby (Den unge Darby, 1780) was a success. But the work that ensured his breakthrough was the work on the theory of acting, Letters from an Old Actor to His Son (Breve fra en gammel Skuespiller til hans søn, 1782) which especially asserts Denis Diderot's love of a mixture of moralizing and naturalism in plays.

Rahbek quickly became one of the most prominent speakers on cultural matters, and with his work as publisher and editor of the journals Minerva and The Danish Spectator (Den danske Tilskuer), he was one of the main voices of the Danish moderate Enlightenment.

Together with librarian and scholar Rasmus Nyerup he founded the Danish study of literary history with the work Contributions to a review of the art of poetry in Denmark (Bidrag til en oversigt over den danske Digtekonst (in five volumes, 1800–1828).

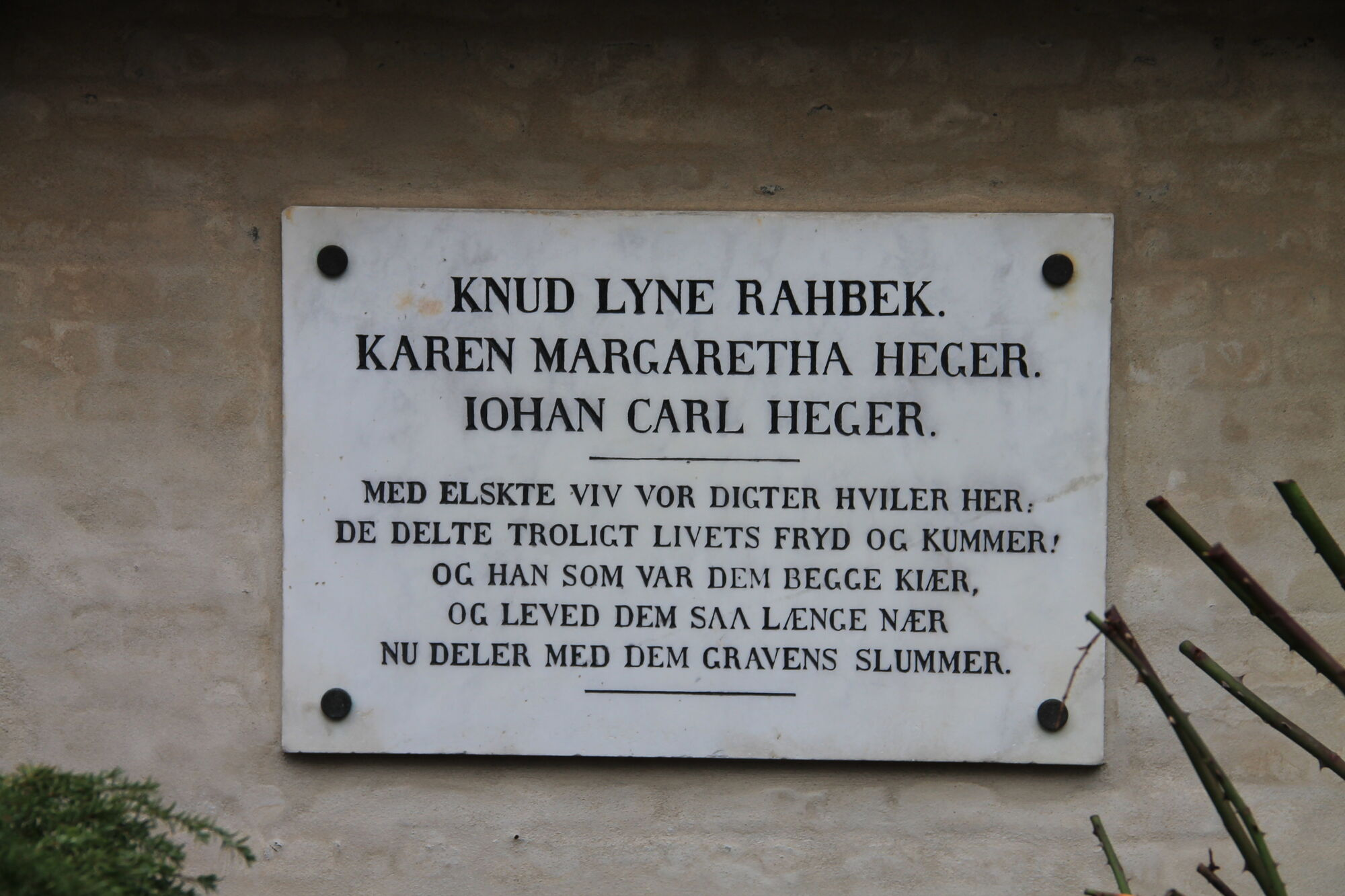
Knud Lyne Rahbek gravsten's tombstone at Frederiksberg Old Cemetery

As a prominent member of the most distinguished of the Danish clubs, most notably Drejers Klub, he wrote a number of drinking songs. He also was one of the only Danish writers of novels and short stories at the turn of the 19th century.

Together with his wife Kamma Rahbek, he held his own "court" at his home in the 17th-century inn turned private property called Bakkehuset in Frederiksberg, a suburb of Copenhagen. Almost all of the Danish writers and prominent persons visited Bakkehuset on a regular basis. Adam Gottlob Oehlenschläger, Hans Christian Andersen, Bernhard Severin Ingemann, Steen Steensen Blicher all were personal friends of the Rahbeks.

== Sources ==
- Conrad, Flemming, Rahbek og Nyerup, Studier fra Sprog- og Oldtidsforskning, Museum Tusculanum, 1979.
- Erslew, Almindeligt Forfatter-Lexicon for Kongeriget Danmark med tilhørende Bilande, København, 1847, vol. 2, s. 603-619.
- Anne E. Jensen, Rahbek og de danske Digtere, in:Frederiksberg gennem Tiderne, VII, 1960.
- Troels-Lund, Bakkehus og Solbjerg, volume 1, Gyldendal, 1971.
