= Romanticism (disambiguation) =

Romanticism was a cultural movement.

Romanticism may also refer to:

- Romanticism (journal), an academic journal established in 1995
- Romanticism: A German Affair, a 2007 book by Rüdiger Safranski

== See also ==
- Romance (disambiguation)
- Romantic (disambiguation)
