= Romance (disambiguation) =

Romance is emotional attraction towards another person and the courtship behaviors undertaken to express the feelings.

Romance may also refer to:

== Common meanings ==
- Romantic orientation, the classification of the sex or gender with which a person experiences romantic attraction towards or is likely to have a romantic relationship with
- Romantic friendship, a very close but typically non-sexual relationship between friends, often involving a degree of physical closeness beyond that which is common in contemporary Western societies
- Romance languages, a subgroup of the Italic languages
  - Romance studies, an academic discipline studying the languages, literatures, and cultures of areas that speak a Romance language

== Places ==
- Romance, Arkansas, U.S.
- Romance, Missouri, U.S.
- Romance, West Virginia U.S.
- Romance, Wisconsin, U.S.

== Arts, entertainment, and media ==
=== Comics ===
- Romance comics, genre of comics of which the central plot focuses on the romantic relationships of the main characters

=== Film ===
- Romance film, a genre of film of which the central plot focuses on the romantic relationships of the protagonists
  - Romantic comedy
  - Romantic thriller
- Romance (1920 film), silent film, directed by Chester Withey
- Romance (1930 film), starring Greta Garbo
- Romance (1936 film), an Austrian film starring Carl Esmond
- Romance (1983 film), a Bollywood film produced and directed by Ramanand Sagar
- Romance (1986 film), Italian drama film directed by Massimo Mazzucco
- Romance (1999 film), directed by Catherine Breillat
- Romance, a 2001 Indian Malayalam-language film, starring Shakeela
- Romance (2011 film), animated
- Romance (2013 film), Telugu-language comedy film directed by Darling Swamy

=== Literature ===
==== Literary genres ====
- Adventure tales
  - Gaslight romance, another name for gaslamp fantasy, featuring fantasy set at a time of approximately 19th-century technology
  - Planetary romance, a genre of science fiction consisting of adventure tales on exotic planets
  - Ruritanian romance, a genre of swashbuckling adventure novels, set in a fictional country, usually in Central or Eastern Europe
  - Scientific romance, an archaic term for the genre of fiction now commonly known as science fiction
- Chivalric romance literature, a branch of medieval and medievalist literature
- Literature of Romanticism, a movement from the late 18th century that broke away from neoclassicism and which emphasized nature, the imagination and emotions
- Hellenistic romance, or Ancient Greek romance, a modern term for the genre of the five surviving Ancient Greek novels
- Romance (prose fiction), a type of novel, especially, but not necessarily, a historical novel, and distinct from genre-fiction love romances
- Romance literature (disambiguation)
- Romance novel, a genre of novel which emerged in the 20th century, directed at women readers, that focuses on romantic love, with many sub-genres:
  - Amish romance, also known as "bonnet rippers"
  - Contemporary romance
  - Historical romance, a 20th-century genre fiction version of the historical novel
  - Paranormal romance
  - Regency romance
  - Fantasy romance

==== Works ====
- Romance (novel), a 1905 novel by Joseph Conrad
- "Romance" (poem), an 1829 poem by Edgar Allan Poe
- Romance (Mamet play), a 2005 play by David Mamet
- Romance (Sheldon play), a 1913 play by Edward Sheldon
- Shakespeare's late romances, or tragicomedies

=== Music ===
==== Albums ====
- Romance (Camila Cabello album), 2019
- Romance (David Cassidy album), 1985
- Romance (Luis Miguel album), 1991
- Romance (Ali Project album), 2006
- Romance (Dave Palmer album), 2006
- Romance (Frank Sinatra album), 2004
- Romance (Tubelord album), 2011
- Romances (Kaada/Patton album), 2004
- Romances (Luis Miguel album), 1997
- Romance (Dorso album), 1991
- Romance (Oneida album), 2018
- Romance (Fontaines DC album), 2024

==== Songs ====
- "Romance" (guitar piece), also known as "Romance Anónimo", a Spanish instrumental guitar piece of anonymous origin
- "Romance", by Claude Debussy
- "Romance", by Gordon Lightfoot from his 1983 album Salute
- "Romance", by Mike Oldfield from his album Light + Shade
- "Romance", the second movement of the suite Lieutenant Kijé (Op. 60) by Sergei Prokofiev
- "Romance", by R.E.M., originally released on the soundtrack of the 1987 film Made in Heaven
- "Romance", from the musical The Desert Song
- Romance in C major, Op. 48, for violin and orchestra by Camille Saint-Saëns
- Violin Romance No. 1 (Beethoven) in G major, Op. 40
- Violin Romance No. 2 (Beethoven) in F major, Op. 50
- "Romance" by Marc Ribot from his 1994 album Shrek
- "Romance" (Buck-Tick song), 2005 single by Buck-Tick
- "Romance" (Yoasobi song), 2021 single by Yoasobi

==== Other uses in music ====
- Romance (music), a type of ballad or lyrical song
  - Romance (meter), a metric pattern found in Spanish ballads
  - Romancero, the corpus of such Spanish ballads, or a collection of them
  - Russian romance or Russian Gypsy song, a type of sentimental art song with hints of Gypsy influence that was developed in Imperial Russia
  - Scandinavian romanser, classical art songs, equivalent to the German Lied
- Romance (band), rock band from London
- Romance Tour (disambiguation)

=== Television ===
- Romance (American TV series), 1949 American anthology series
- Romance (South Korean TV series), 2002 South Korean drama series
- "Romance" (Not Going Out), a 2017 episode

== See also ==
- A Fine Romance (disambiguation)
- A Romance (disambiguation)
- Romansa (disambiguation)
- Romantic (disambiguation)
- Romanza (disambiguation)
- Romanticism
- Romancecar
