= Romansa =

Romansa may refer to:

- Romansa (1947 film), a Filipino film starring Mila del Sol
- Romansa (1970 film), an Indonesian film starring Chitra Dewi
- Romansa, a 1979 Filipino film starring Vilma Santos
- Romansa (Cindy Bernadette album), 2012
- "Romansa", song by Nedeljko Bajić Baja from the album Zapisano je u vremenu

== See also ==
- Romanza (disambiguation)
- Romance (disambiguation)
