= Adam Oehlenschläger =

Danish poet & playwright (1779–1850)

Adam Gottlob Oehlenschläger
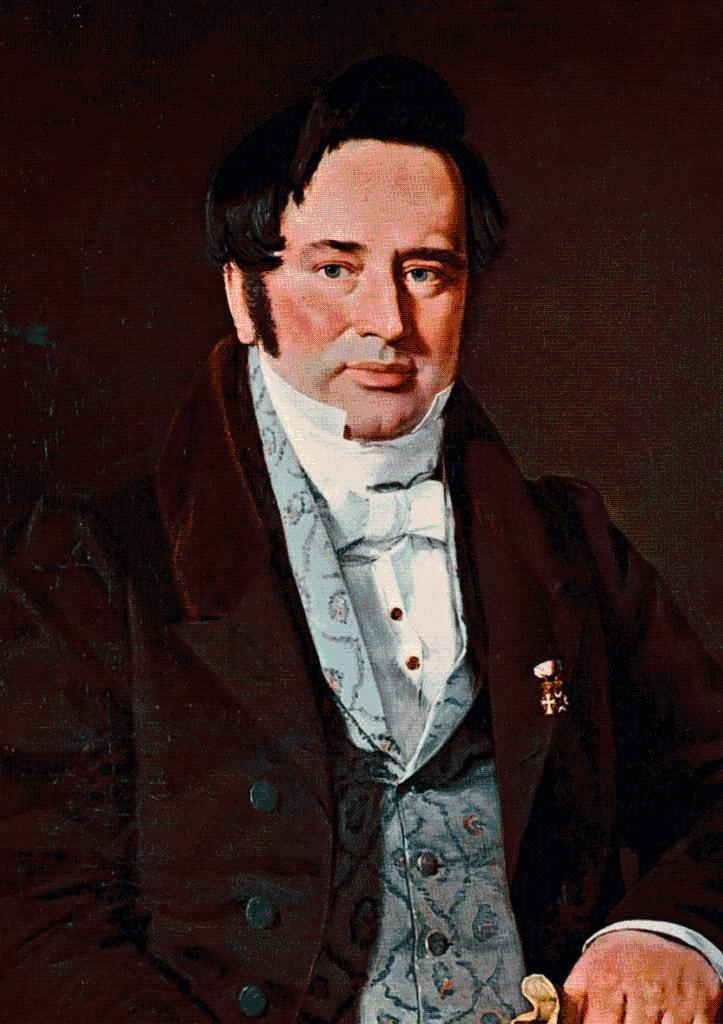
- Portrait of Adam Oehlenschläger by Christian Albrecht Jensen (1825)
- Born: 14 November 1779; Copenhagen, Denmark-Norway
- Died: 20 January 1850 (aged 70); Copenhagen, Denmark
- Resting place: Frederiksberg Ældre Kirkegård, Copenhagen
- Education: University of Copenhagen
- Occupations: Poet, playwright
- Spouse: Christiane Georgine Elisabeth Heger (m. 1810; died 1841)
- Relatives: Kamma Rahbek (sister-in-law); Knud Lyne Rahbek (brother-in-law)
- Writing career
- Notable works: Hakon Jarl hin Rige (1807) Axel og Valborg (1810); Nordens guder (1819)

Signature
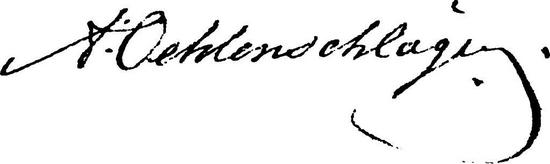

Adam Gottlob Oehlenschläger (Danish pronunciation: [ˈɛːtɑm ˈkʌtlʌp ˈøˀənˌslɛːjɐ]; 14 November 1779 – 20 January 1850) was a Danish poet and playwright. He introduced romanticism into Danish literature. He wrote the lyrics to the song Der er et yndigt land, which is the national anthem of Denmark.

== Biography ==
He was born in Vesterbro, then a suburb of Copenhagen. His father, Joachim Conrad Oehlenschläger (1748–1827) was at that time organist of Frederiksberg Church and later, keeper of the royal palace of Frederiksberg. The poet's mother Martha Marie Hansen (1745–1800) suffered from depression, which afterwards deepened into melancholy madness. (Note: One or more of the preceding sentences incorporates text from a publication now in the public domain: Gosse, Edmund (1911). "Öhlenschläger, Adam Gottlob". In Chisholm, Hugh (ed.). Encyclopædia Britannica. Vol. 20 (11th ed.). Cambridge University Press. pp. 33–34.)

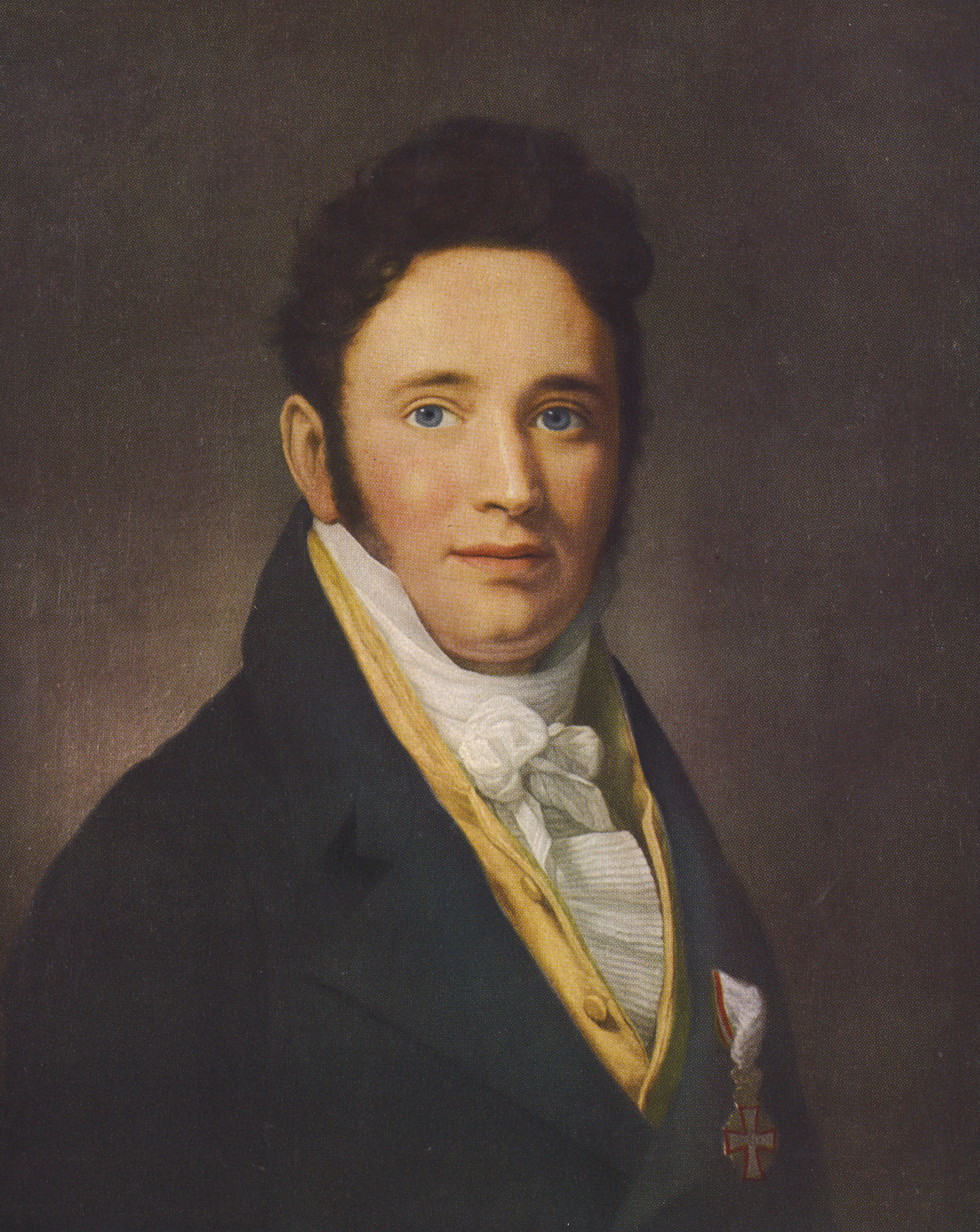
Portrait of Oehlenschläger by Friedrich Carl Gröger

Oehlenschläger and his sister Sophie Ørsted (1782–1818) were taught only to read and write, until their twelfth year. At the age of nine, Oehlenschläger began to write fluent verses. Three years later, he attracted the notice of the poet Edvard Storm (1749–1794) and as a result Oehlenschläger received an introduction into Scandinavian mythology.

Oehlenschläger was confirmed in 1795, and was to have been apprenticed to a tradesman in Copenhagen. He also entered the stage where he was offered a small position. In 1797 he made his appearance on the boards in several successive parts, but soon discovered that he possessed no real histrionic talent. Jurist Anders Sandøe Ørsted (1778–1860) who would later marry his sister Sophie, persuaded him to quit the theatre, and in 1800 he entered the University of Copenhagen. He was disturbed in his studies by the death of his mother, by his inveterate occupation with poetry, and finally by the First Battle of Copenhagen in April 1801, which, however, inspired a dramatic sketch (April the Second 1801), the first work of the kind by his pen that we possess.

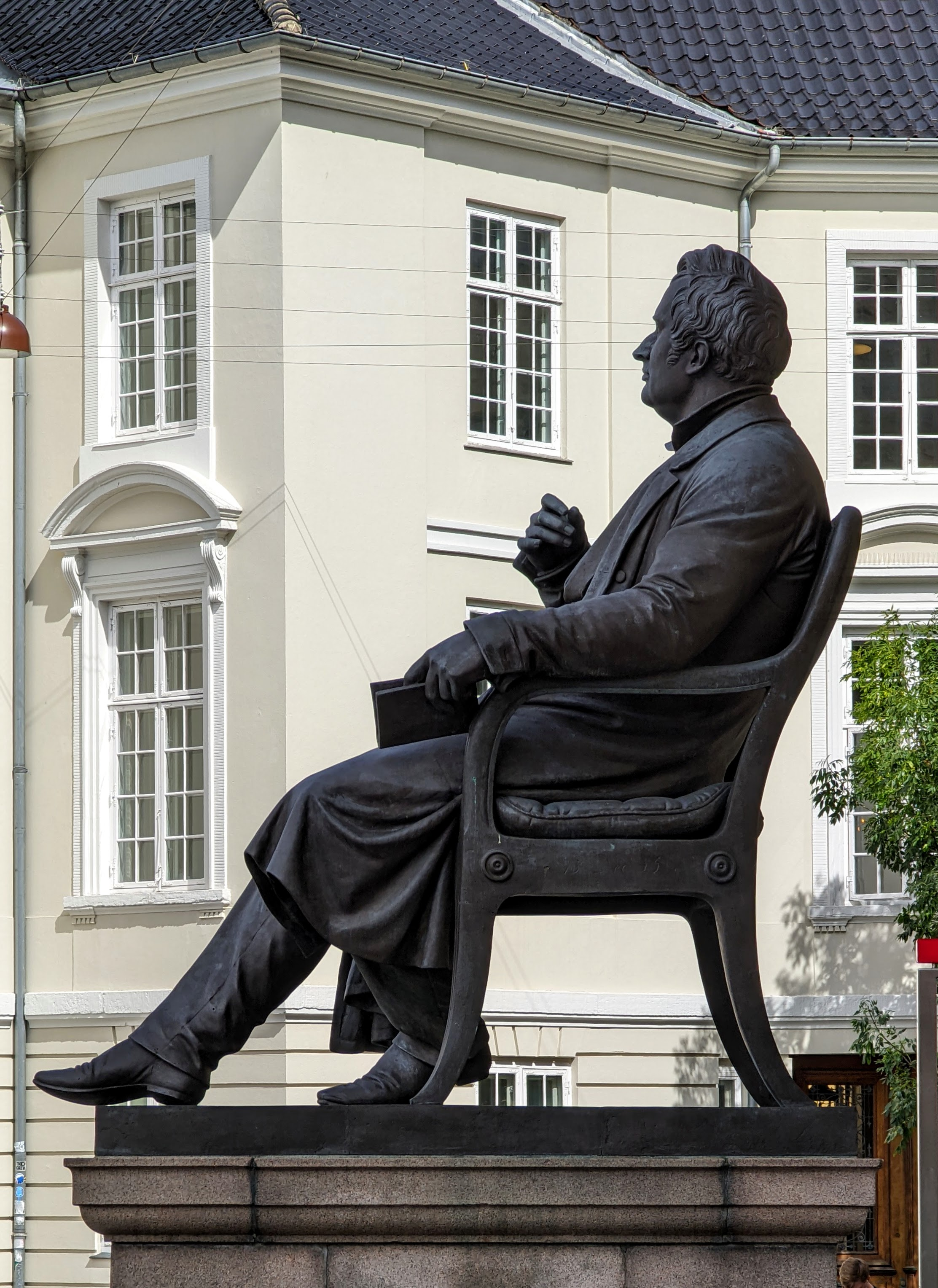
Adam Oehlenschläger statue in front of the Royal Theater, Copenhagen, by H. W. Bissen, 1861

In the summer of 1802, when Oehlenschläger had an old Scandinavian romance, as well as a volume of lyrics in the press, the young Norse philosopher, Henrik Steffens (1773–1845), returned to Copenhagen after a long visit to Friedrich Wilhelm Joseph Schelling (1775–1854) in Germany. He was full of new romantic ideas. His lectures at the university, in which Goethe and Schiller were revealed to the Danish public for the first time, created a great sensation. Steffens and Oehlenschläger met one day resulting in a conversation of sixteen hours. After Oehlenschläger returned home, he wrote at a sitting his poem Guldhornene, in a manner totally new to Danish literature. The result of his new enthusiasm speedily showed itself in a somewhat hasty volume of poems, published in 1803, now chiefly remembered as containing the piece called Sanct Hansaften-Spil.

The next two years saw the production of several exquisite works, in particular the epic of Thors Reise til Jotunheim, the poem in hexameters called Langelandsreisen, and the bewitching fantasy Aladdin (1805). At the age of twenty-six, Oehlenschläger was universally recognised, even by the opponents of the romantic revival, as the leading poet of Denmark. He now collected his Poetical Writings in two volumes. He found no difficulty in obtaining a grant for foreign travel from the government, and he left Denmark for the first time, joining Steffens at the University of Halle in August 1805. Here he wrote the first of his great historical tragedies, Hakon Jarl, which he sent off to Copenhagen, and then proceeded for the winter months to Berlin, where he associated with Wilhelm von Humboldt, Johann Gottlieb Fichte and met Goethe for the first time.

In the spring of 1806 he went on to Weimar, where he spent several months in daily intercourse with Goethe. Autumn of that year was passed with Tieck in Dresden, and he proceeded in December to Paris. Here he resided eighteen months and wrote his three famous masterpieces, Baldur hin Gode (1808), Palnatoke (1809), and Axel og Valborg (1810). Oehlenschläger had also made his own translation of Aladdin into German, adding some new material which does not appear in the 1805 edition; this revised version was published in Amsterdam in 1808. Ferruccio Busoni later used the text of this translation for the last (choral) movement of his Piano Concerto Op. 39. Later editions of Oehlenschläger's play do not contain this text.

In July 1808 he left Paris and spent the autumn and winter in Switzerland as the guest of Madame de Staël at Coppet, in the midst of her salon. In the spring of 1809, Oehlenschläger went to Rome to visit Bertel Thorvaldsen, and in his house wrote the tragedy of Correggio. He hurriedly returned to Denmark in the spring of 1810, partly to take the chair of aesthetics at the University of Copenhagen, partly to marry the sister-in-law of Knud Lyne Rahbek, to whom he had been long betrothed. His first course of lectures dealt with his Danish predecessor Johannes Ewald, the second with Schiller. From this time forward his literary activity became very great; in 1811 he published the Oriental tale of Ali og Gulhyndi, and in 1812 the last of his great tragedies, Stærkodder.

From 1814 to 1819 his admirers were engaged in a long and angry controversy with Baggesen, who represented the old didactic school. This contest seems to have disturbed the peace of Oehlenschläger's mind and to have undermined his genius. His talent may be said to have culminated in the cycle of verse-romances called Helge, published in 1814. The tragedy of Hagbarth og Signe, (1815), showed a distinct diminution of his powers. In 1817 he returned to Paris, and published Hroars Saga and the tragedy of Fostbrødrene. In 1818 he was again in Copenhagen, and wrote the idyll of Den lille Hyrdedreng and the Eddaic cycle called Nordens Guder. His next productions were the tragedies of Erik og Abel (1820) and Væringerne i Miklagaard (1826), and the epic of Hrolf Krake (1829). His last volumes were Tordenskjold (1833), Dronning Margrethe (1833), Sokrates (1835), Olaf den Hellige (1836), Knud den Store (1838), Dina (1842), Erik Glipping (1843), and Kiartan og Gudrun (1847). After his death his Recollections (1850) were published in two volumes.

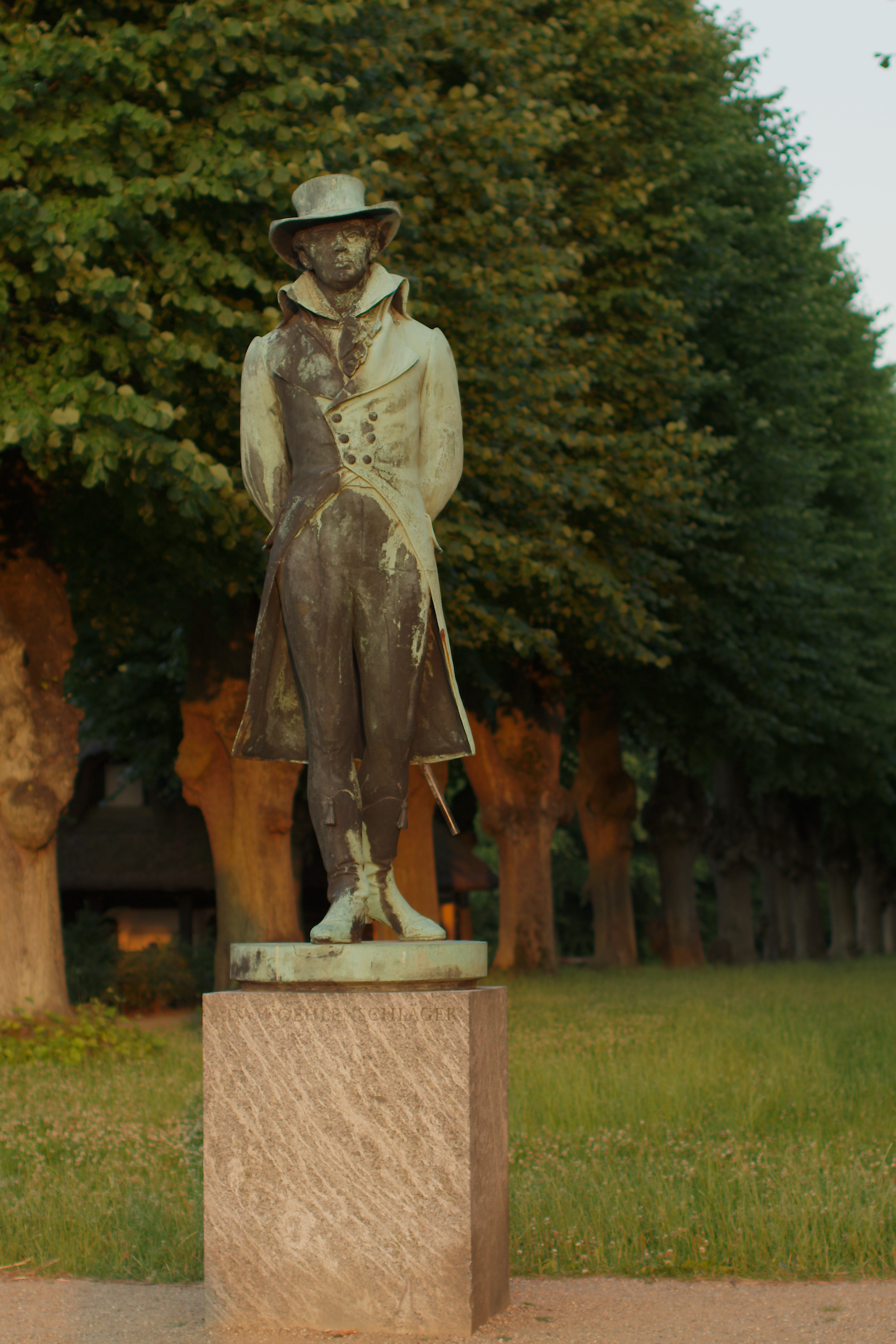
Statue of Adam Gottlob Oehlenschläger in Frederiksberg Gardens (Copenhagen)

== Personal life ==
Adam Oehlenschläger married Christiane Georgine Elisabeth Heger (1782–1841) in 1810. She was the sister of Kamma Rahbek (1775–1829), the wife of Knud Lyne Rahbek (1760–1830). Oehlenschläger died 20 January 1850 and was buried in the cemetery of Frederiksberg Church.

== Legacy ==
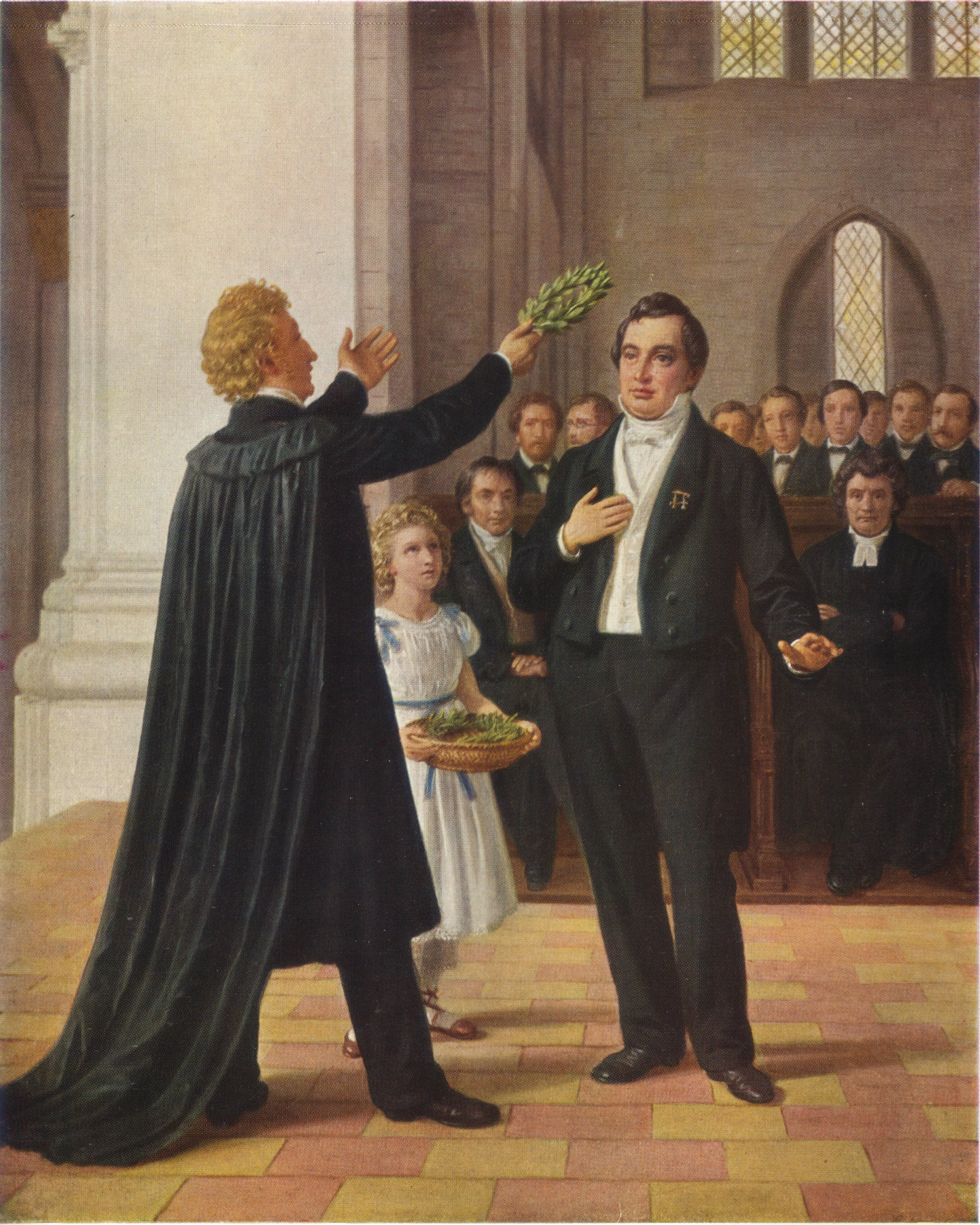
Oehlenschläger crowned with laurel by Tegner at Lund Cathedral by Constantin Hansen (1866)

Adam Oehlenschläger was one of the principal pioneers of the romantic movement in Europe. With the exception of Ludvig Holberg (1684–1754), no Danish writer before 1870 has exercised so wide an influence. His work awoke among his countrymen an enthusiasm for the poetry and religion of their ancestors. He supplied his countrymen with romantic tragedies at a time when all eyes were turned to the stage. His plays fulfilled the stage requirements of the day, and were popular beyond all expectation. He performed to an extent that his name remains to this day synonymous with Scandinavian romance.

The earliest are the best: Oehlenschlager's dramatic masterpiece being his first tragedy, Hakon Jarl. Although his inspiration came from Germany, he is not much like a German poet, except when he is consciously following Goethe; his analogy is rather to be found among English poets than his contemporaries.

== Honours ==
- In 1829 he was publicly laurel-crowned in Lund Cathedral as the "king of Nordic Poetry" and the "Scandinavian King of Song" by Esaias Tegnér, Bishop of the Diocese of Växjö (1782–1846).
- On his seventieth birthday (14 November 1849) a public festival was arranged in his honor. He was decorated by the king of Denmark as a Knight Grand Cross in the Order of the Dannebrog.

== Footnotes ==
=== Sources ===
- Beaumont, Antony (1985). Busoni the Composer. London: Faber and Faber. ISBN 0-571-13149-2.

=== Further reading ===
- Andersen, Vilhelm (1899). Adam Oehlenschläger, et livs poesi (København, Nordiske forlag).

Academic offices
| Preceded by Jens Wilken Hornemann | Rector of University of Copenhagen; 1831–1832 | Succeeded by Jens Møller |
