= Romantic =

Romantic is an adjective which primarily relates to romance. It may also refer to:

== Genres and eras ==
- The Romantic era, an artistic, literary, musical and intellectual movement of the 18th and 19th centuries
  - Romantic music, of that era
  - Romantic poetry, of that era
  - Romanticism in science, of that era
  - Romantic chess of that era
- Romance film, a genre

== Concepts ==
- Romanticization, any unrealistically positive depiction

== Books ==
- The Romantic (Gowdy novel), by Barbara Gowdy
- The Romantic (Boyd novel), 2022 novel by William Boyd

== Film & TV ==
- Romantic (film), a 2021 Indian Telugu-language romantic film
- The Romantic (film), a 2009 animated film
- The Romantics (film), a 2010 romantic comedy film
- The Romantics (TV series), a 2023 Netflix documentary series
- "The Romantic" (The Amazing World of Gumball), an episode of The Amazing World of Gumball

== Music ==
=== Classical ===
- Romantic, Anton Bruckner's 1881 Symphony No. 4
- Romantic, Carlos Chávez's 1953 Symphony No. 4
- Romantic, Howard Hanson's 1930 Symphony No. 2

=== Popular ===
- The Romantics, an American rock 'n roll band from Detroit
- Romantic (album), 2016, by Mannequin Pussy
- Romantic?, a 1990 album by the Human League
- Romantic (EP), 1988, by Chisato Moritaka
- The Romantic (album), 2026, by Bruno Mars
- "Romantic" (song), by Karyn White
- "Romantics", a song by Tove Lo from the 2017 album Blue Lips

== See also ==
- Dr. Romantic, a 2016–2017 South Korean television series
- Dr. Romantic 2, a 2020 South Korean television series
- Romance (disambiguation)
- Romantic comedy (disambiguation)
- Romantic friendship
- Romantic orientation, a person's preferred sex or gender for a romantic partner
- Romantic Symphony (disambiguation)
