= Romanza (disambiguation) =

Romanza is a 1997 music album by Andrea Bocelli, and its title track.

Romanza (Italian and Spanish, 'Romance') may also refer to:

- Romance (music), a traditional music term, including a list of compositions entitled "Romance" or "Romanza"
  - Romanza (Sephardic music)
- Romanza, a 2005 album by Liona Boyd
- Romanza, a 2011 album by Jim Brickman
- Romanza, a 2011 film directed by Michael Miner (RoboCop writer) about Frank Lloyd Wright's Eddie's House

== See also ==
- Romansa (disambiguation)
- Romance (disambiguation)
- Romanza final, a 1986 biographic film about opera singer Julián Gayarre
