= A Romance =

A Romance may refer to:

- A Romance, a painting by Santiago Rusiñol
- Middle Age: A Romance, a bestselling 2001 novel
- Possession: A Romance, a 1990 bestselling novel
- The Abbess: A Romance, a gothic novel by William Henry Ireland
- The Scarlet Letter: A Romance, an American novel

== See also ==
- Romance (disambiguation)
