= Poudre d'or =

Song composed by Erik Satie

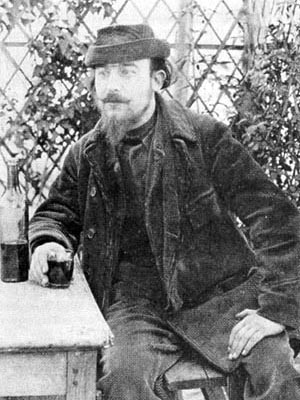
Erik Satie

Poudre d'or (Gold Dust) is a waltz for solo piano composed in 1901 by Erik Satie. It is the first notable example of his light café-concert idiom, and is still popular today. In performance it lasts about 5 minutes. Satie also created a version for small orchestra but this survives only in a fragmentary state.

== Background ==
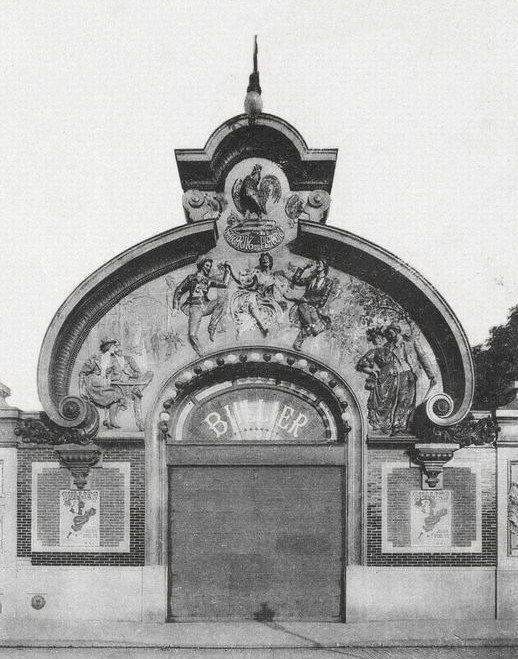
The Bal Bullier in Paris was open from 1847 to 1940.

In a letter to his brother Conrad in March 1899 Satie wrote, "As a result of being offered work of extreme lowliness (accompaniment), I have wasted valuable time but earned some money from this trade". He was describing his first forays into the realm of popular music as a pianist/arranger for entertainer Vincent Hyspa (1865–1938). Poverty had forced him into hackwork and he didn't handle the job with good grace. In the evenings friends had to lock Satie in a room to keep him sober enough to perform. Nevertheless, he immersed himself in the workaday world of the café-concert and found a more palatable option writing waltzes and valses chantées (waltz songs), ballroom staples at the time. His notebooks contain dozens of waltz strains, very few of which were published; the latter came to include Je te veux (1902) and Tendrement (1903), both classic examples of the Belle Époque valse chantée.

Poudre d'or was composed for the famous Bal Bullier in the Latin Quarter of Paris, for nearly a century one of the most popular dance halls in the city. This shows Satie venturing beyond his old stomping grounds of Montmartre to the Left Bank, to Montparnasse, which eventually became the new cutting-edge artistic center of Paris. Satie contributed to this development by basing his future activities in the area, including his latter-day education at the Schola Cantorum.

== Piano version ==
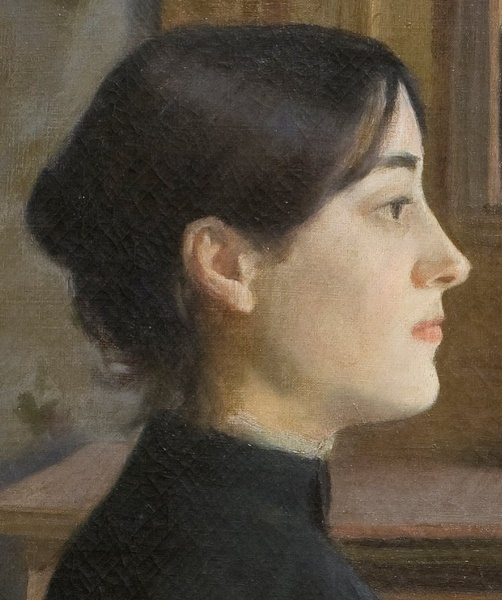
Stéphanie Nantas, dedicatee of Poudre d'or, painted by Santiago Rusiñol.

Satie dedicated Poudre d'or to his friend Stéphanie Nantas (d. 1913), a Montmartre model with whom he had posed in Santiago Rusiñol's painting A Romance (1894). This was one of only two occasions between 1894 and 1911 – the wilderness years of Satie's "serious" music career – that he felt confident enough to dedicate a work to someone. Satie and Nantas knew each other at least through 1908, but we know too little of their relationship to ascertain the personal significance of his (then) quite unusual gesture.

Poudre d'or was originally titled Pluie d'or (Gold Rain), after a waltz by Émile Waldteufel whom Satie probably used as a model. Its structure is pretty basic – a waltz and a trio, with an introduction and a coda – all built from four melodic strains. The first two strains (in D major and G major) comprise the waltz while the final two (in A major and E major) account for the trio; the waltz returns with the trio's conclusion. Simple cantabile melodies in the top voice float above a formula oom-pah-pah accompaniment, for the most part plainly harmonized. The music is warm and lyrical but, coming from Satie, quite conventional. Perhaps too conventional for the composer's taste, since at the proof stage of publication he slipped a few chromatic quirks into the harmony to stamp the work as identifiably his. Certainly most characteristic is the tongue-in-cheek coda that tells the dancers it is time to get off the floor. The waltz rhythm is halted by a series of repetitive cadential patterns that sound like a spoof of the pompous finales of some classical compositions. Satie would reuse this "never-ending coda" joke as a Beethovian parody in his humoristic piano suite Embryons desséchés (1913).

Satie registered the piano score with SACEM on March 11, 1902. It was published by the firm Baudoux that same year.

== Orchestral version ==
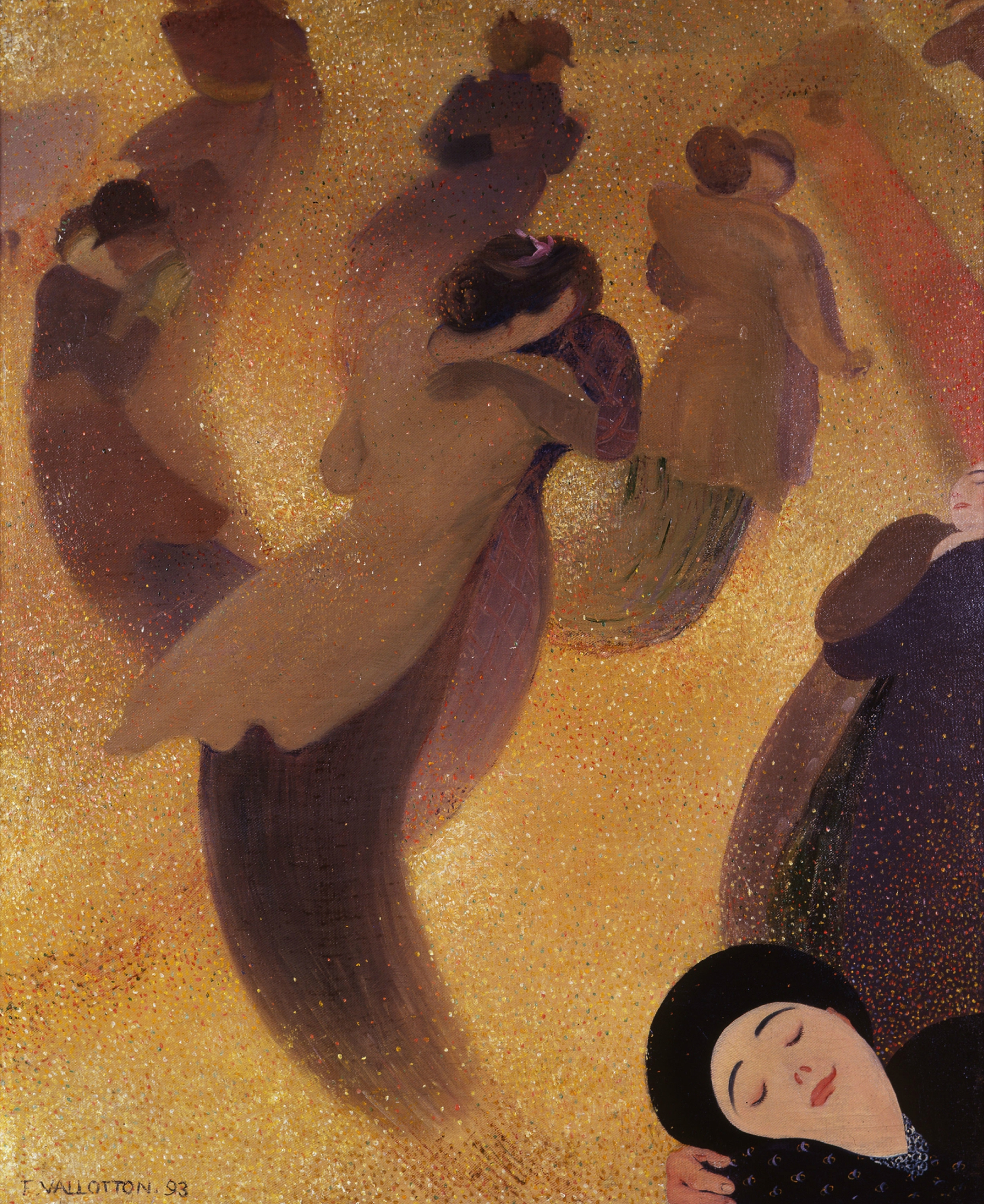
Félix Vallotton, La Valse (1893).

According to the manuscripts Satie composed the small orchestral version of Poudre d'or first, but it was a distinct work under the same title. Version 1 is a suite consisting of six melodic strains, sharing only the primary waltz theme with the four-strain piano version. The sketches of the orchestral suite are very sparse and do not convey the completed work; some parts for individual instruments have been discovered, but not enough to reconstruct a performing version of the entire piece. Satie's sketches include a page marked "Bullier" with a list of the instrumental forces available at that venue. He scored Poudre d'or for piccolo, flute, oboe, 2 clarinets in A, bassoon or tuba, 2 horns, 2 cornets in A, 3 trombones, percussion (tambourine, cymbals, bass drum), and strings.

The problems of orchestration were very much on Satie's mind when he wrote Poudre d'or, for it was around this time he abandoned his experimental tone poem for large orchestra, Le Bœuf Angora (The Angora Ox, c. 1901), as a failure. Writing and arranging dance music gave Satie opportunities to hone his technique with instrumental groupings he was familiar with and some of his "brasserie" scoring (such as for La Diva de l'Empire) shows assurance and imagination. The café-concert and the dance hall would influence Satie's mature orchestral style long after he was schooled in the art by Vincent d'Indy at the Schola. Beginning with Socrate (1919) Satie scored all his larger works for chamber ensembles of 25 to 30 players, because he favored a crisp, clear sound that suited his stripped-down creative aesthetic.

== Recordings ==
Jean-Joël Barbier (BAM, 1967), Aldo Ciccolini (twice, for Angel in 1968 and EMI in 1987), Frank Glazer (Vox, 1968, reissued 1990), Daniel Varsano (CBS, 1979), France Clidat (Forlane, 1980), Angela Brownridge (Warner Classics, 1985), Jean-Pierre Armengaud (Le Chant du Monde, 1986), Anne Queffélec (Virgin Classics, 1988), Pascal Rogé (Decca, 1989), Klára Körmendi (Naxos Records, 1994), Bojan Gorišek (Audiophile Classics, 1994), Grant Johannesen (Vox, 1994), Olof Höjer (Swedish Society Discofil, 1996), Mari Tsuda (JVC, 1997), Peter Dickinson (Olympia, 2001), Jean-Yves Thibaudet (Decca, 2003), Håkon Austbø (Brilliant Classics, 2006), Cristina Ariagno (Brilliant Classics, 2007), Alexandre Tharaud (Harmonia Mundi, 2009), Steffen Schleiermacher (MDG, 2011), Jeroen van Veen (Brilliant Classics, 2016), Stephanie McCallum (ABC, 2016), Noriko Ogawa (BIS, 2016), Duanduan Hao (Naxos, 2018), Giacomo Scinardo (Dynamic, 2018), Nicolas Horvath (Grand Piano, 2019), Marcel Worms (Zefir, 2021).
