= Axel and Valborg =

1808 tragedy by Adam Oehlenschläger

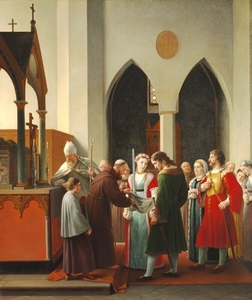
A scene from the tragedy of Axel og Valborg (1818).

Axel and Valborg (Danish: Axel og Valborg) is a tragedy in five acts by Adam Oehlenschläger. It was written in Paris in 1808 and printed in Copenhagen in 1810. There is an English translation by F. S. Kolle.

== Origin of story ==
The story is taken from a Danish romantic ballad, the last verse of which Oehlenschläger used as a motto:

May God forsake the wicked wretch
Who two like these would part
When glows a warm and mutual love
In young and virtuous heart

The ballad was well known throughout the Scandinavian countries long before Oehlenschläger's time. In Ludvig Holberg's poem “Peder Paars,” the bailiff's wife was almost drowned in a flood of tears because parts of it had been read to her.

== Plot ==
The whole action of the drama takes place in the famous Trondhjem Cathedral, in Norway, during the reign of Haakon Herdebred. Axel and Valborg are cousins who love each other. In spite of the Pope's dispensation removing the legal impediment, a scheming monk prevents their marriage.

== Reception ==
In his own generation, Oehlenschläger's Axel and Valborg was the most favored and admired of all his writings. Through it, the romantic-sentimental style of poetry gained general favor. When Baggesen, beginning his review in a critical and hostile spirit, reached the famous lines spoken by the pure and innocent Valborg, as she crowns her lover's initials with flowers: “I bid thee, my love, good morning,” he was absolutely carried away and praised the work in the highest terms.

== Selected productions ==
=== Dagmar Theatre, 1907 ===
A production of the play directed by Martinius Nielsen premiered at the Dagmar Theatre in Copenhagen on 22 November 1906. The cast consisted of :

- Adam Poulsen as Axel Thordsøn
- Alfred Møller as Biørn Gamle
- Anna Larssen as Valborg
- Axel Strøm as Erland, Erkebiskop
- Egill Rostrup as Hakon Herdebred, Norges konge
- Einar Rosenbaum as Gotfred, Vilhelms svend
- Johan Knüttel-Petersen as Fjendtlig kæmpe
- Johannes Poulsen as Vilhelm
- Knud Levinsen as Kolbein
- Martinius Nielsen as Sortebroder
- Viggo Wiehe as Sigurd af Reine
- Aage Hertel as Endrid hiin Unge
