= Doghouse =

Shelter built for dogs

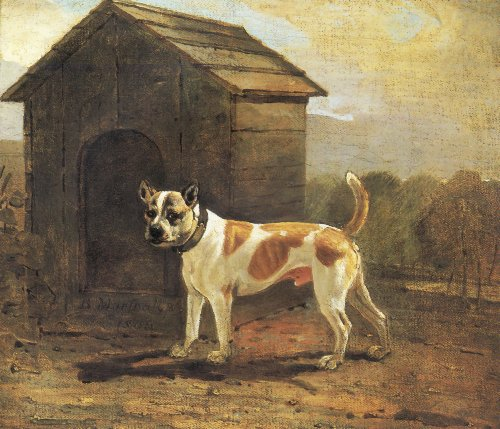
Doghouse circa 1835

A doghouse, also known as a kennel, is an outbuilding to provide shelter for a dog from various weather conditions.

== Background ==
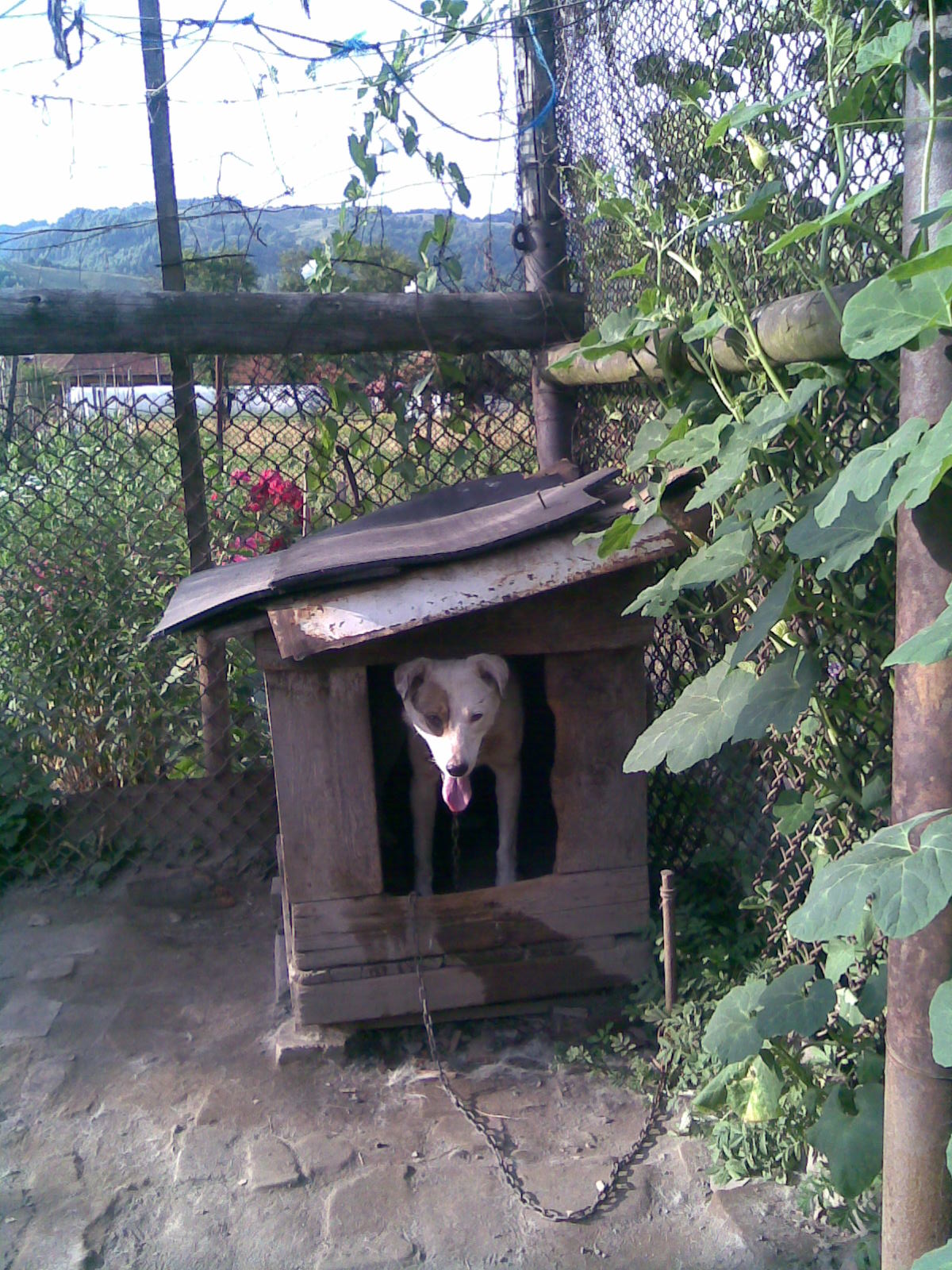
Scrap material

Humans and domesticated dogs have been companions for more than 15,000 years, beginning with the wolf and hunter–gatherers. Initially, dogs would inhabit the outdoors staying close to humans. Mud was used to construct the earliest known doghouses. Over the millennia crude doghouses were built from the scrap material that was available to owners at the particular time and place.

During the Industrial Revolution, economies of scale allowed manufactured doghouses to become a standard commercial product that could be sold to the mass market. Mass production allowed manufacturers to improve the design and quality of materials used to construct a doghouse.

During the 1800s, the animal rights movement began creating legislation for animal rights and animal welfare. This allowed the creation of organizations like the humane society and the Society for the Prevention of Cruelty to Animals (SPCA), which have set standards of care for dogs that live outdoors including a properly designed doghouse that is structurally sound, weatherproof, insulated, of adequate size and appropriate for the dog's use, at all times. Municipalities enforce legislation to protect dogs living outdoors with the animal control service.

A wide variety of materials are used to make doghouses, including: hardboard, hard wood, plywood, and plastic. Do it yourself (DIY) projects allow owners to construct the doghouse to their exact design specifications using the best possible materials for their dogs' needs. Recent advancements in technology have led to the development of smart dog houses, which offer features such as temperature control, automatic doors, and environmental monitoring. These smart shelters can automatically adjust temperature, humidity, and air quality to ensure pets' comfort, with some models also allowing remote control via mobile apps. According to a report by Research Nester, the pet tech market, which includes innovations like smart pet houses, is expected to reach a revenue of USD 37 billion by 2035, reflecting the growing demand for technology-integrated pet care solutions.

== Gallery ==
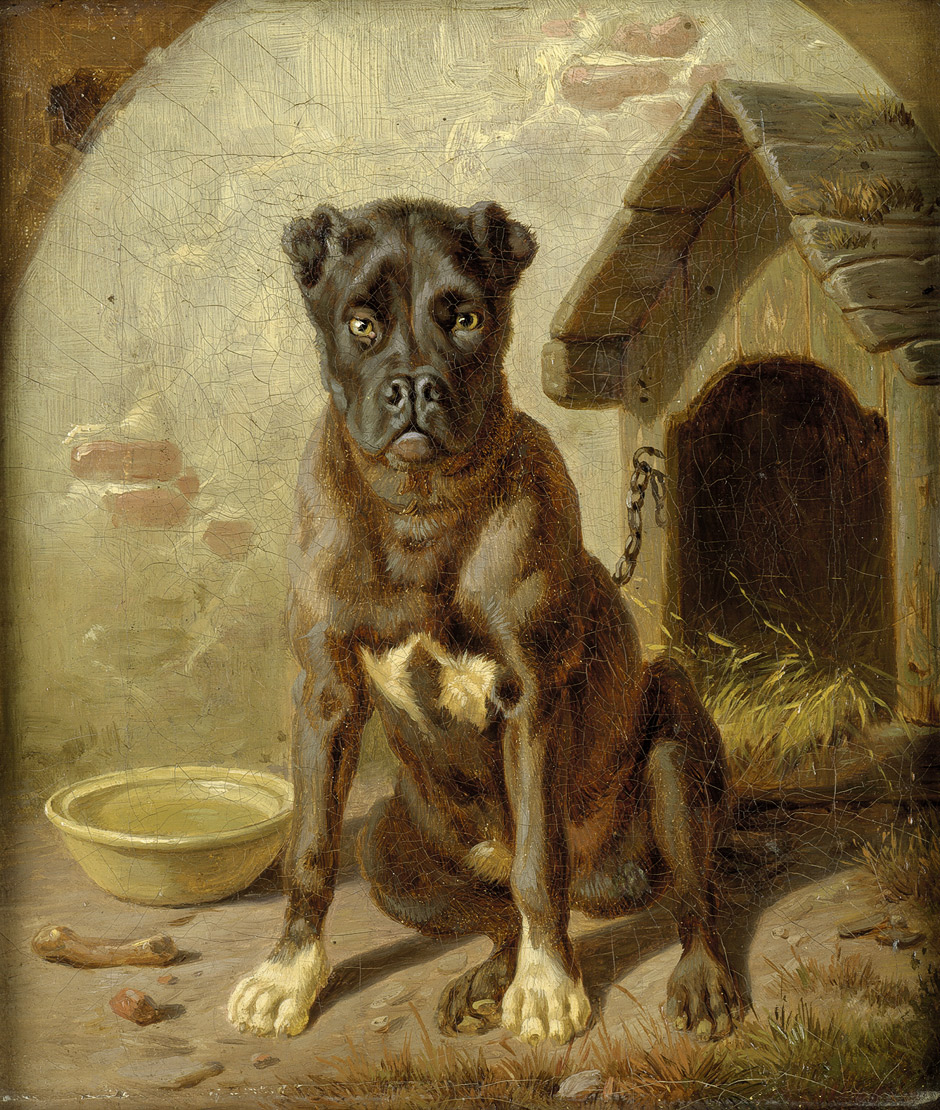

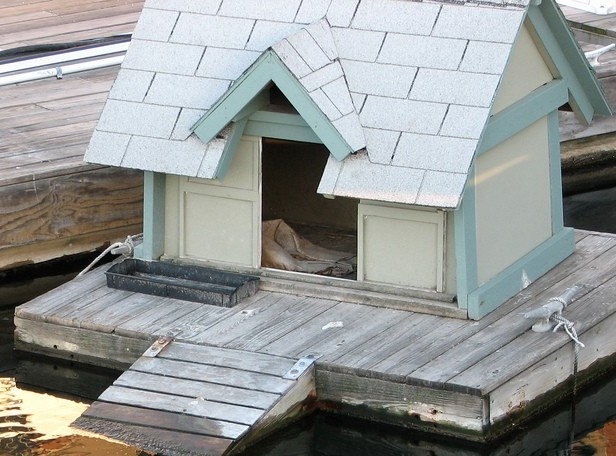

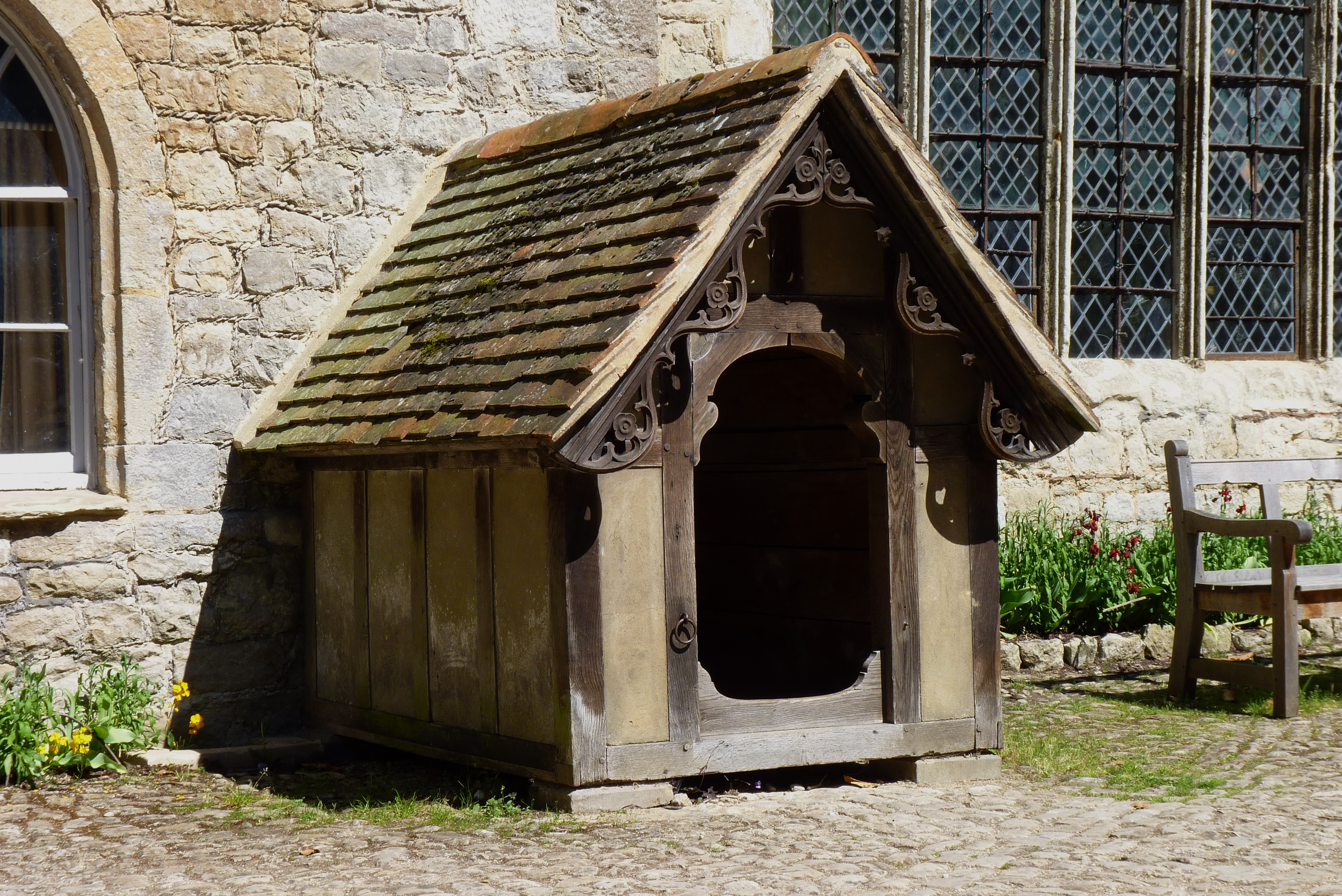

== See also ==
- Animal shelter
- Eddie's House
- Kennel
