= A Fine Romance =

A Fine Romance may refer to:

- "A Fine Romance" (song), a 1936 popular song written by Jerome Kern and Dorothy Fields
- A Fine Romance (film), a 1991 Italian comedy
- A Fine Romance (1981 TV series), a 1980s British sitcom
- A Fine Romance (1989 TV series), a 1989 American comedy-drama
- A Fine Romance, a 1984 play by William James Royce
