= Romansa (Cindy Bernadette album) =

Studio album by Cindy Bernadette
- Released: 2012
- Genre: Pop, R&B, Jazz
- Label: Platinum Records

Cindy Bernadette chronology
Miracles (2012)	Romansa (2012)	Serenata (2015)

Alternative cover

Romansa is a 2012 Indonesian-language album by Cindy Bernadette.

== Track listing ==
1. Kamulah Satu-Satunya
2. Pertama
3. Bawa Daku Pergi
4. Perawan Cinta
5. Memori
6. Tak Kan Ada Cinta Yang Lain
7. Selamanya Cinta
8. Ingin Ku miliki
