= A Romance (Rusiñol) =

1894 painting by Santiago Rusiñol

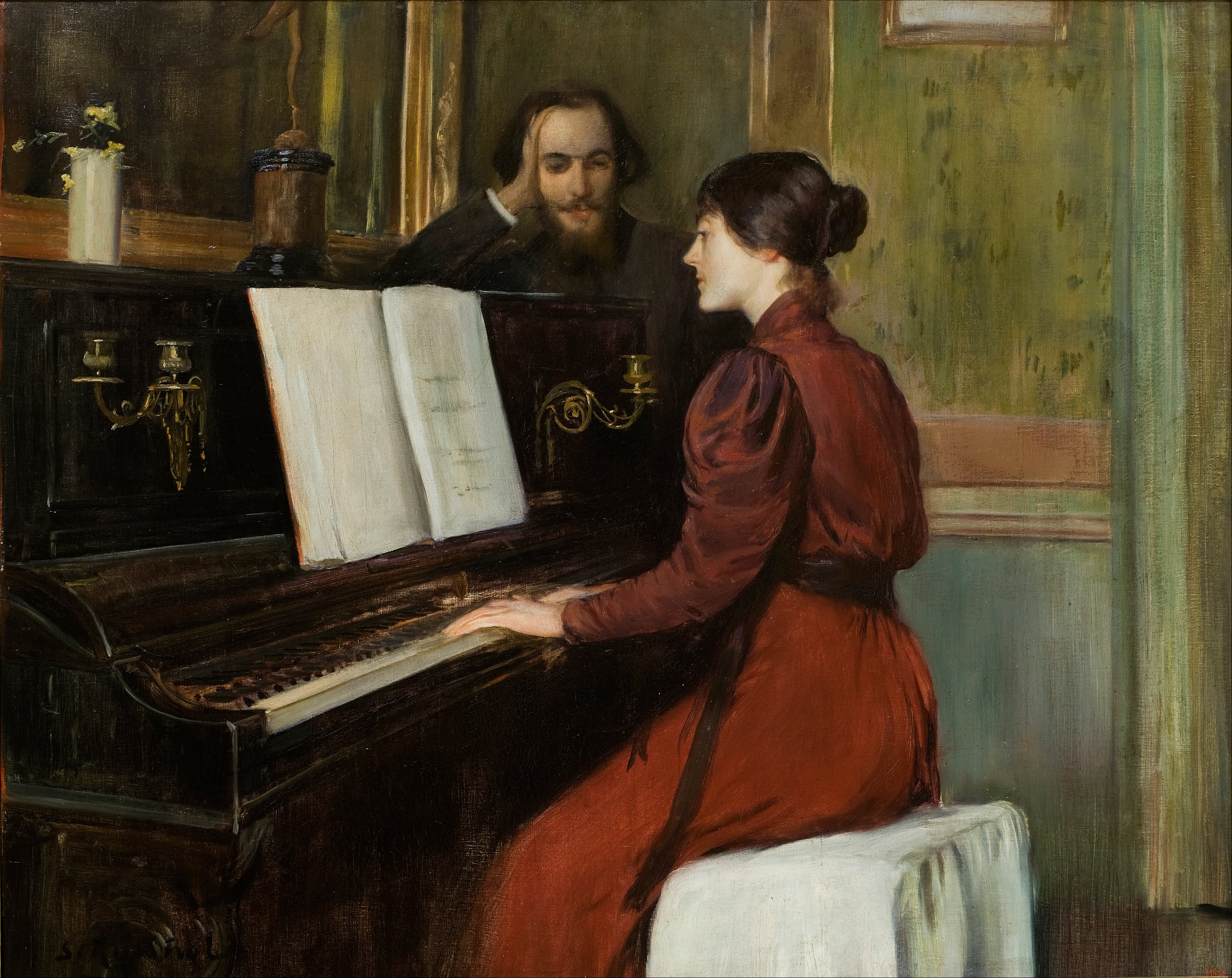
- Artist: Santiago Rusiñol
- Year: 1894
- Medium: Oil on canvas
- Dimensions: 89.5 cm × 111 cm (35.2 in × 43.7 in)
- Location: Museu Nacional d'Art de Catalunya, Room 46; Barcelona

A Romance is a genre painting by Spanish artist and author Santiago Rusiñol. Executed in Paris in 1894, it depicts French composer Erik Satie and his friend Stéphanie Nantas in a moment of intimate music making. It resides at the Museu Nacional d'Art de Catalunya in Barcelona.

Due to modern interpretations, this artwork has acquired some notoriety in Satie's iconography in the 21st Century.

== History ==
Rusiñol came from a well-to-do Catalan family and lived in Paris intermittently between 1889 and 1894, where he assimilated the influences of Post-Impressionism and the Franco-Belgian Symbolist movement. He stayed primarily near the Moulin de la Galette in the raffish arts community of Montmartre, becoming friends with Satie (whose likeness he portrayed four times) and model-turned painter Suzanne Valadon. During his 1894 Paris sojourn Rusiñol dropped his earlier bohemianism, which he admitted was a pose for his travel writing, and rented a luxurious furnished flat on the Quai de Bourbon, Île Saint-Louis. Its jade green and blue walls can be seen in several of his canvases, including A Romance.

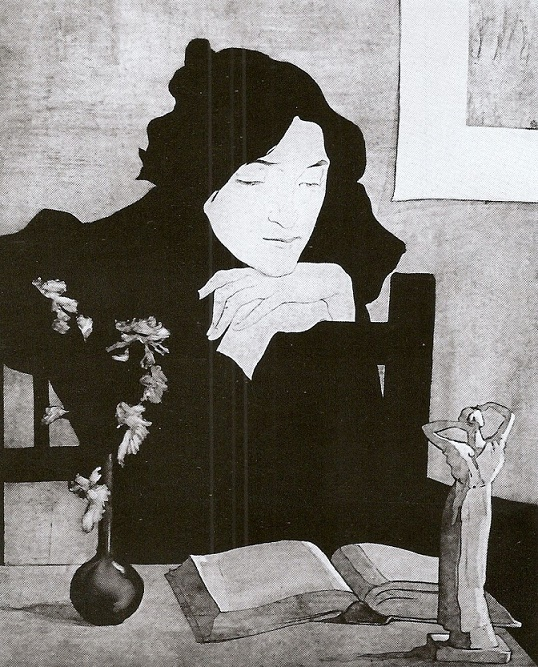
The Young Woman with Tanagra (1897), etching by Alfredo Müller. Stéphanie Nantas wearing mourning black

Stéphanie Nantas, the daughter of a music teacher, became Rusiñol's favorite model during this period. A tall, fragile-looking Parisienne with haunted eyes, she posed for Pierre Puvis de Chavannes, Ramon Casas and Alfredo Müller; in several of her known portraits and figure studies she is dressed in deuil noire, suggesting she was in mourning for a loved one. (She never married). Rusiñol painted Nantas a dozen times, in works ranging from brooding portraits with titles like Melancholy and Reverie, to the controversial La medalla and La morfina, before-and-after depictions of a woman using morphine. Rusiñol was addicted to the drug at the time but there is no real-life evidence Nantas used as well.

At first glance A Romance appears to be a conventional rendering of an already clichéd domestic image, but there is psychological and ironic subtext at play here. Despite the intimacy of the scene there is no sense of connection between the figures. Nantas focuses on the score before her with a cool stare that gives nothing away; an empty candle holder on the piano is swiveled forward as if in use, acting as a sort of barrier to keep the two at a proper distance. Satie appears lost in thought or in the music. His eyes are closed, but Rusiñol's loose handling of paint allows the reflections of light and shadow through his pince-nez to create an illusion of wakefulness. In terms of the genre the work could be a dry spoof or private joke, reinforced by the artist having two Montmartre bohemians portray a perfectly respectable young couple. "A Romance" could be a face value title or the type of piano piece Nantas is playing; or it could be an ironic allusion to Satie's affair with Suzanne Valadon, which had ended traumatically (for him) a year earlier. Rusiñol knew of the relationship but was not inclined towards humor in his art, so it's not impossible that Satie - who always needed to control his public image - proposed the idea for the painting himself.

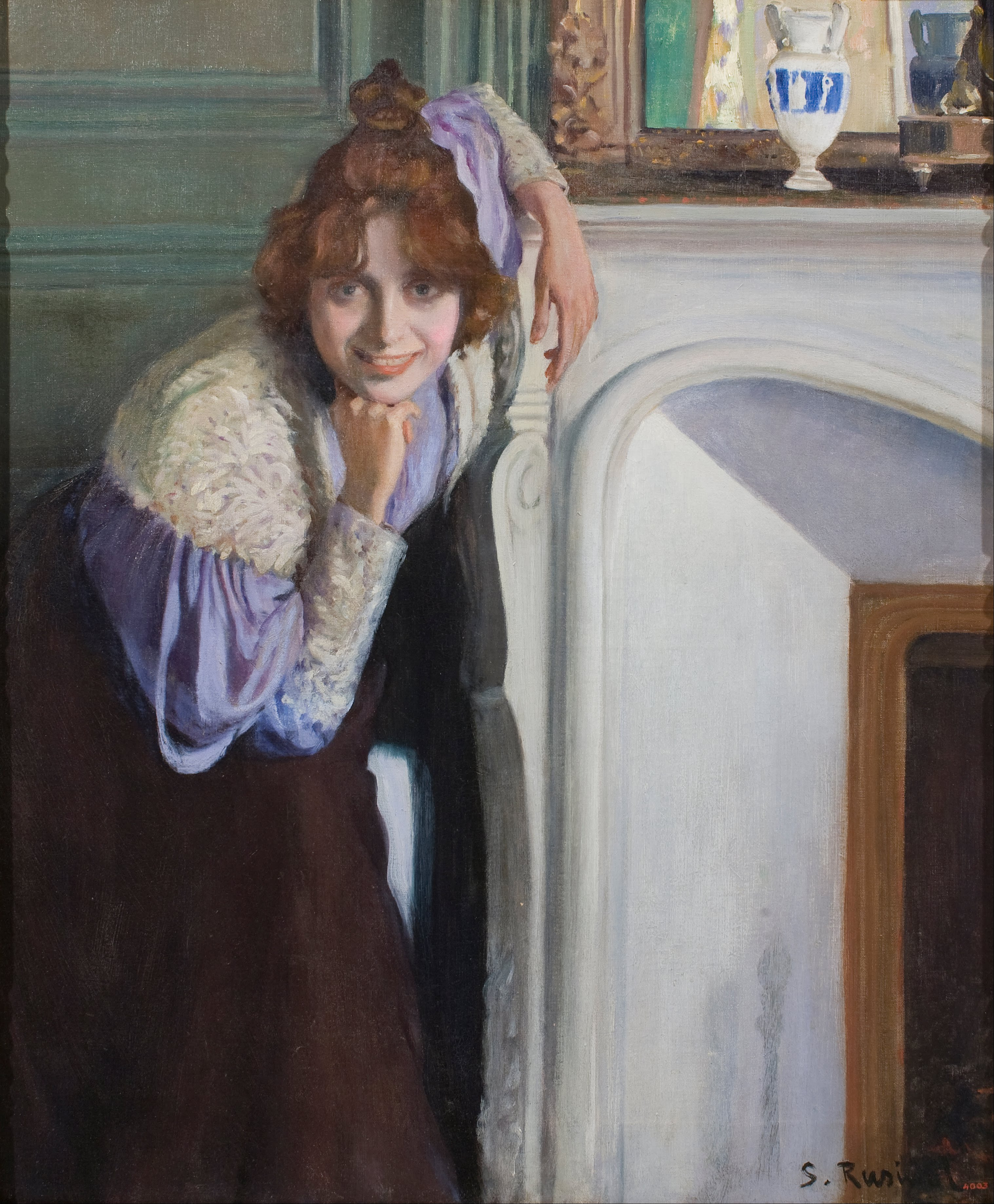
Rusiñol, The Laughing Girl (1894)

Since the 2010s some commentators have assumed that A Romance is an idealized double portrait of Satie and Valadon during their liaison. They make the connection that the artist had known and painted both parties before, but don't factor in the timeline or how Nantas can be identified through Rusiñol's contemporaneous work. Pushing further against this claim is the anonymous subject of another 1894 Rusiñol painting, The Laughing Girl. The model is a dead ringer for Valadon, from her big blue eyes and favorite style of her dark red hair, to the cheekiness of her pose. If so, Rusiñol evidently did not take sides over her leaving Satie and remained friendly with both.

Following Rusiñol's return to Spain, Satie and Nantas stayed in touch; seven years later he dedicated his waltz for piano Poudre d'or (Gold Dust, 1901) to her. From 1896 she was the companion of Italian painter Egisto Paulo Fabbri. At the wedding of painter Alfredo Müller on February 5, 1908, Satie and Nantas were among the witnesses and signed the marriage certificate side by side. Fabbri's 1910 Portrait of Stéphanie shows her still striking but visibly afflicted by the tuberculosis that darkened her last years. She died in 1913.

A Romance was well received at its first showing at the Second General Exhibition of Fine Arts in Barcelona (1894). The painting was acquired by the Barcelona City Council and eventually became part of the permanent collection of the Museu Nacional d'Art de Catalunya.

== Notes and references ==
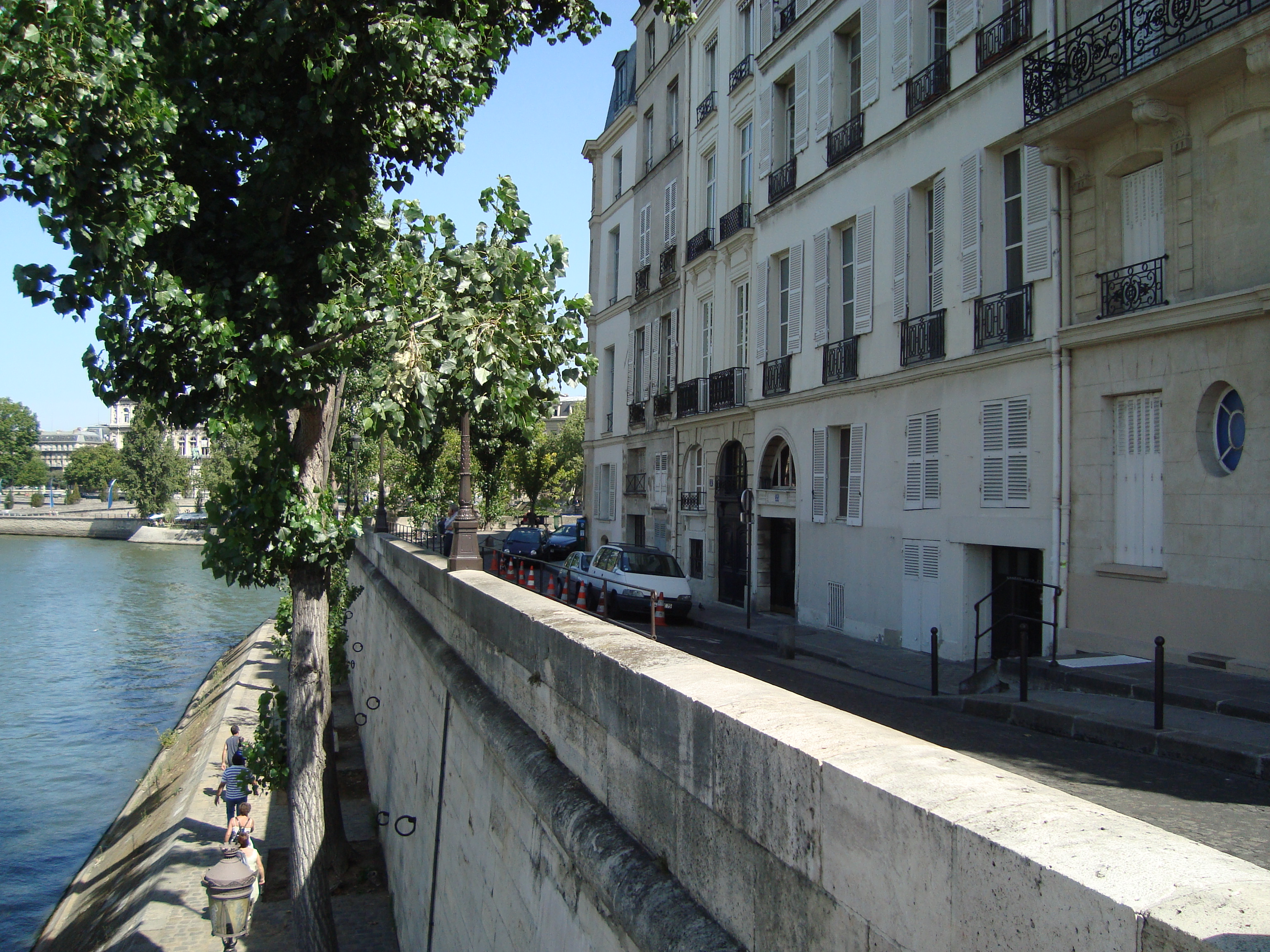
53 Quai de Bourbon (center right), Île Saint-Louis, Paris, where Rusiñol lived and painted in 1894
