= Eddie's House =

Frank Lloyd Wright-designed doghouse

- Interactive map of the Eddie's House area

General information
- Type: doghouse
- Architectural style: Pre-Usonian
- Location: Redwood Road, San Anselmo, California
- Coordinates: 37.97575°N 122.57556°W
- Completed: 1963
- Destroyed: 1973
- Client: Jim Berger

Technical details
- Floor area: 4 square feet (0.37 m^{2})

Design and construction
- Architect: Frank Lloyd Wright

Eddie's House was a doghouse designed by Frank Lloyd Wright for the Berger family of San Anselmo, California, to be used by their dog Eddie. Wright designed Eddie's House to be in keeping with the family's home, known as the Robert Berger House, which he had previously designed. The plans for the doghouse were completed by Wright in 1957, and the 4 ft^{2} (0.37 m^{2}) triangular house was built in 1963. In 1973 Eddie's House was removed and thrown away, but in 2010 Jim and Eric Berger, sons of Robert Berger, rebuilt Eddie's House from the original plans for a segment in Romanza, a documentary film by Michael Miner about Frank Lloyd Wright's architectural works in California. The doghouse is the smallest structure Wright ever designed.

== History ==
Eddie's House was a doghouse designed by Frank Lloyd Wright as an addition to the Robert Berger House. The Robert Berger House is a dwelling designed by Frank Lloyd Wright for the Berger family. Wright gave the plans to trained engineer and College of Marin professor Robert Berger to build the house on his own on Redwood Road in San Anselmo, California. It took 20 years to finish the US$15,000 house.

In 1956, Robert's 12-year-old son Jim Berger became concerned about his black Labrador Retriever Eddie staying outside in the winter, and decided he needed a doghouse to stay warm. Jim subsequently wrote a letter to Frank Lloyd Wright stating, "I would appreciate it if you would design me a doghouse which would be easy to build but would go with our house." Jim continued to explain Eddie's dimensions ("two and a half feet high and three feet long"), his dog's age ("four years old or in dog life 28 years"), and his ability to pay for the plans and materials of the doghouse with earned money from delivering newspapers along a bicycle paper route he had. Wright responded to the letter with a typed and signed note on Taliesin West stationery. The note stated that "A house for Eddie is an opportunity...but just now I am too busy to concentrate on it." Wright implored the boy to write again a year later to see if he was a little less busy.

Jim followed the suggestion laid out by Wright and a year later wrote again asking for a Frank Lloyd Wright-designed doghouse. Not long after sending out this second letter a full set of working drawings arrived in the mail for a four square foot triangular doghouse designed by Wright himself. The doghouse was to be built of scrap Philippine mahogany and cedar left over from the construction of the human-sized house it was to be situated next to. Looking back at the situation a 68-year-old Jim Berger stated:

My dog had a lot of class, and a Frank Lloyd Wright doghouse was perfect for him. I was very excited for my dog.

Jim Berger never built the doghouse and in 1963, at the age of 19, Jim joined the U.S. Army. That same year, after Jim's departure, his younger brother Eric and his father completed the doghouse. Eddie did not particularly like the new house and took to sleeping by the front door of the Robert Berger House instead, presumably because it was warmer there. "That was kind of depressing," stated Jim Berger when reflecting on the incident.

Robert Berger died in 1973 and Mrs. Berger, not seeing any value in a triangular doghouse that Eddie and the subsequent dogs they owned would not sleep in, had it hauled to the dump the same year.

In 2010, while filming a documentary about buildings designed by Wright in California, Michael Miner stumbled across the doghouse story. Miner asked Jim Berger if rebuilding Eddie's House was an option. Jim, at this point a retired woodshop teacher, said that he had wanted to rebuild the doghouse for years and this was the opportunity to do so. Over the next three months Jim and his brother Eric, a skilled cabinetmaker, were filmed by Miner rebuilding the doghouse to Wright's specification in Eric's Petaluma, California garage. Jim Berger said, in relation to the construction process, "In the letter, I said I wanted something easy to build, but this doghouse was not easy to build. It was very complicated."

The construction process is featured in Miner's documentary, Romanza, and the rebuilt doghouse also went on a publicity tour for the film. During filming, the rebuilt doghouse was placed on the side of the Robert Berger House where the original once sat. On that day it happened to be raining and Miner noticed something peculiar about the doghouse which it had in common with other Wright-designed structures: "It leaks."

== Design ==
Eddie's House is the smallest structure ever known to be designed by Frank Lloyd Wright and fits in well with the Robert Berger House. Eddie's House was constructed of the same materials as the larger house and the "small triangular hut... bowed to the hexagonal geometry of the house's hexagonal plan." The doghouse also displays many signature design elements that have come to represent Frank Lloyd Wright's architectural style. These include an entrance hidden on the rear of the house, and a large overhang on a roof with a low pitch.

When Eddie's House was actually constructed, the Berger family did not follow Wright's plans strictly. They changed the location of the door as well as not including a concrete base planned by Wright to make the doghouse portable.

== See also ==
- List of Frank Lloyd Wright works
