= Bal Bullier =

Ballroom in Paris, France

Coordinates: 48.8403°N 2.3376°E

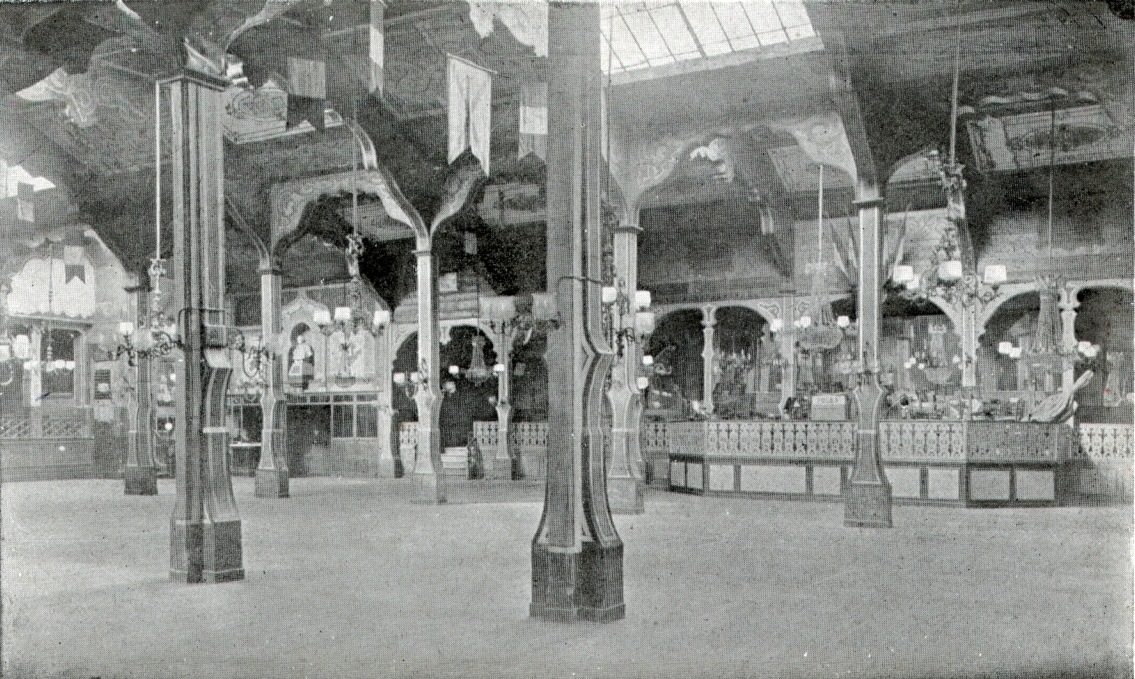
Bal Bullier

Bal Bullier was a ballroom in Paris, France, created by François Bullier in the mid-nineteenth century.

== History ==
François Bullier was an employee of La Grande Chaumière ballroom. In 1843, he purchased the Prado d'Été located 31 avenue de l'Observatoire in the 5th arrondissement of Paris. In 1847, he finished remodeling the place and opened it to the public under the name Closerie des Lilas. The ballroom was a hangout for students where they could dance, play billiards, practice archery and shooting. Bullier added an oriental touch in 1850, and a Gallic rooster in 1895 with the Latin posting "salvatit et placuit" (he saves and soothes).

The Bullier Hall was popular for dancing and drinking. The entrance fee was two francs on Thursday nights, and one franc on Saturday nights.

It closed in 1940. It was located at 39 Avenue Georges Bernanos in the district of Val-de-Grace in the 5th arrondissement, at the location of Bullier Centre CROUS.

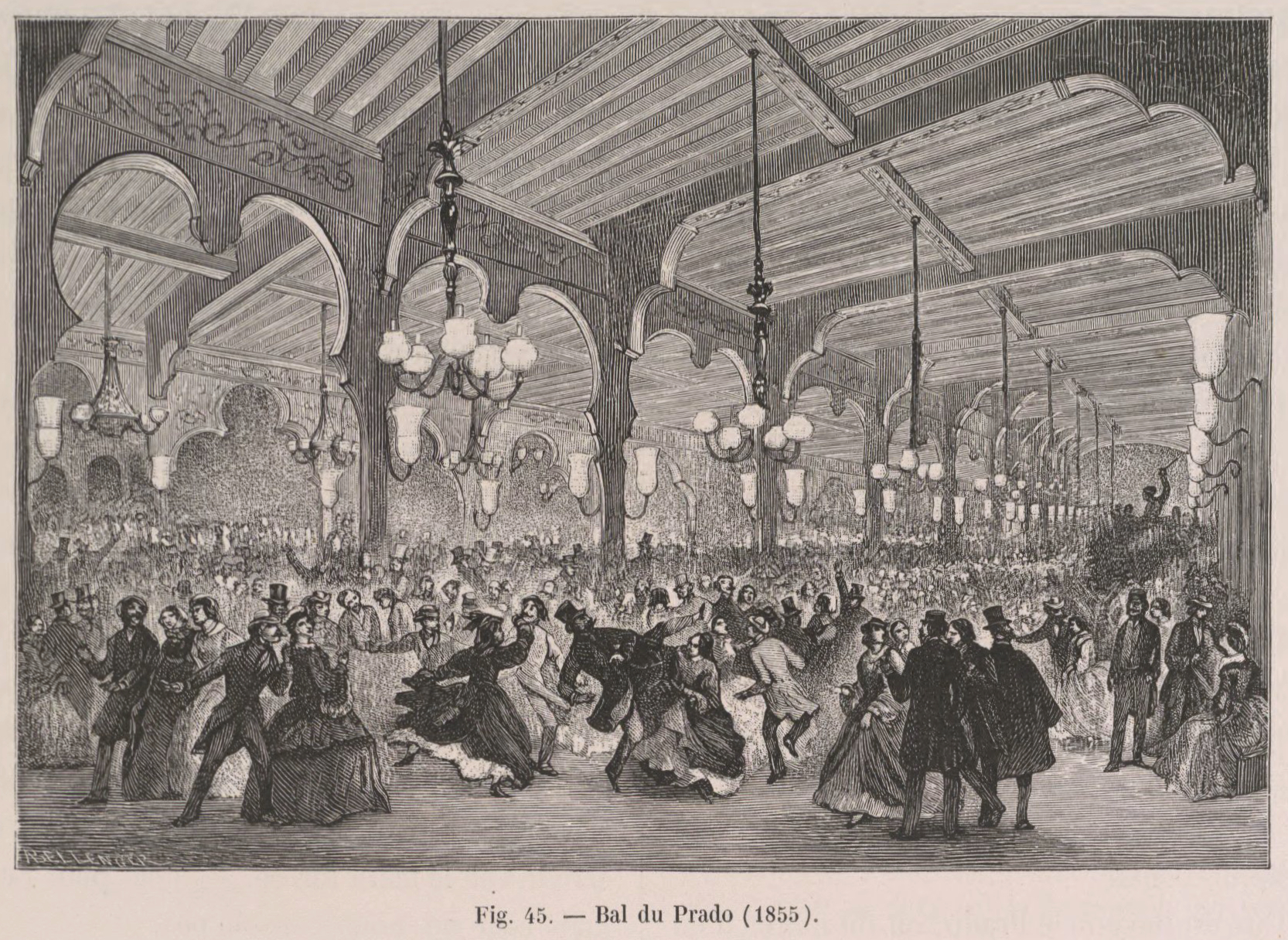
Bal du Prado by Theodor Josef Hubert Hoffbauer, 1855.

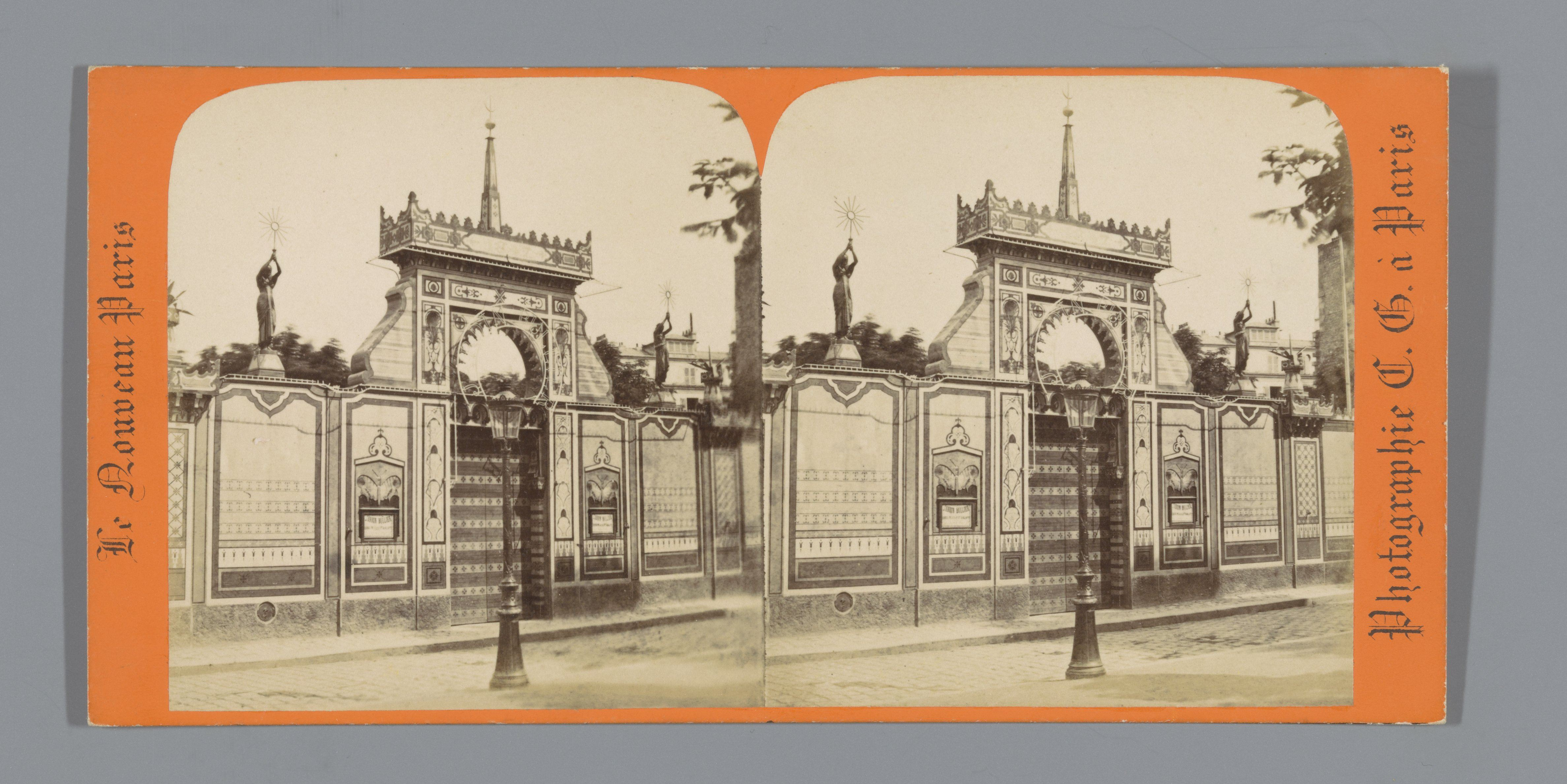
Entrance gate, 1850–1875.

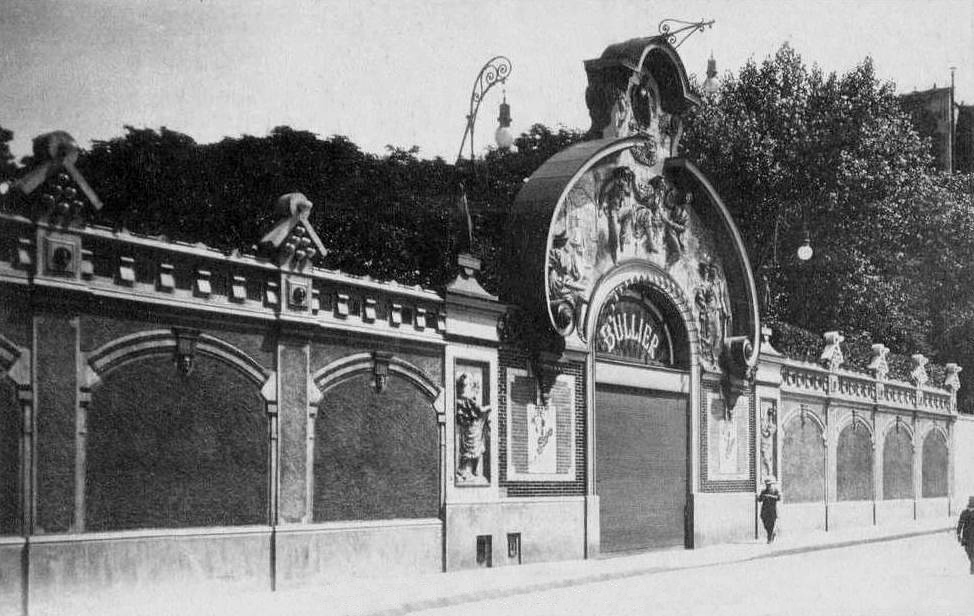
Entrance gate, circa 1914.

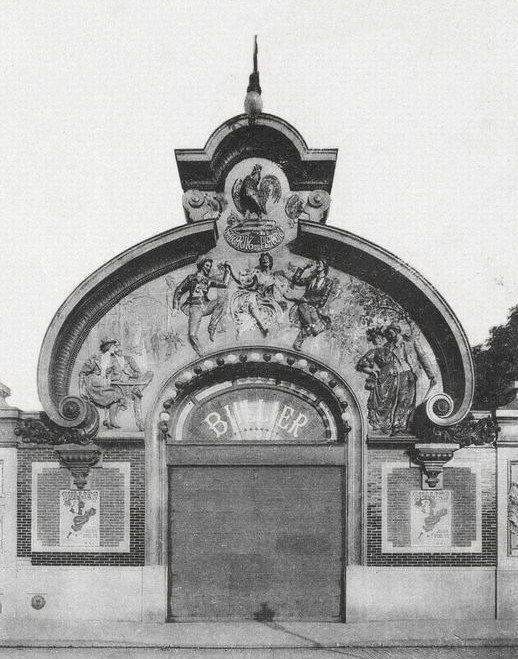
Entrance gate, circa 1930.

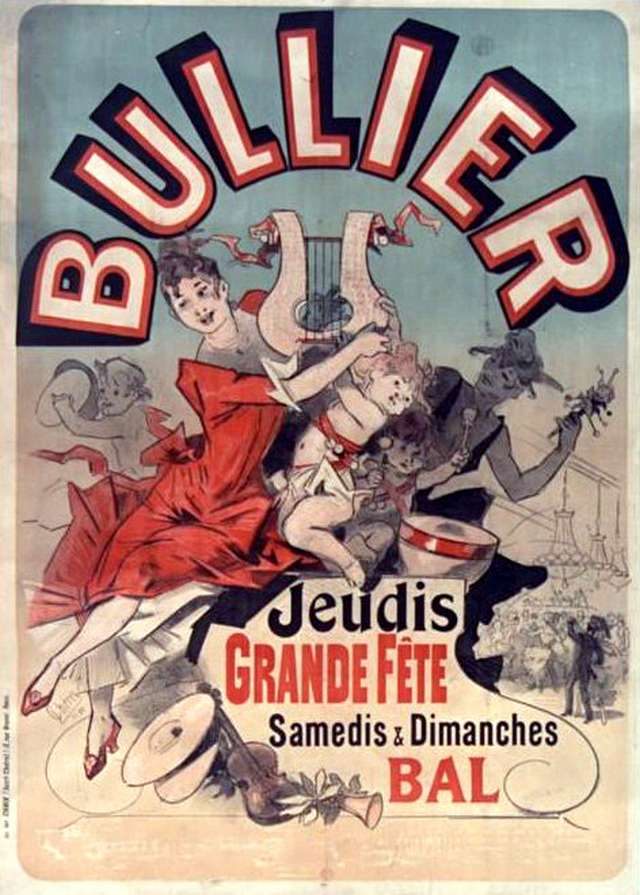
Poster of the Bal Bullier, 1888.

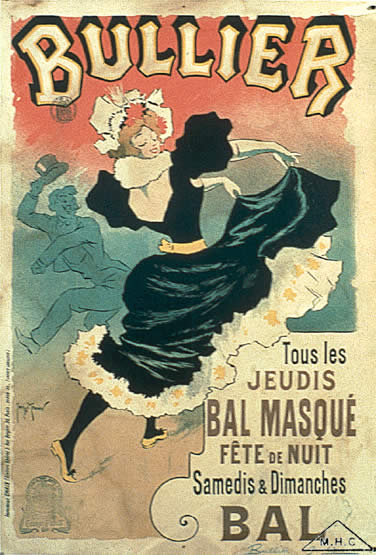
Poster of the Bal Bullier, 1894.

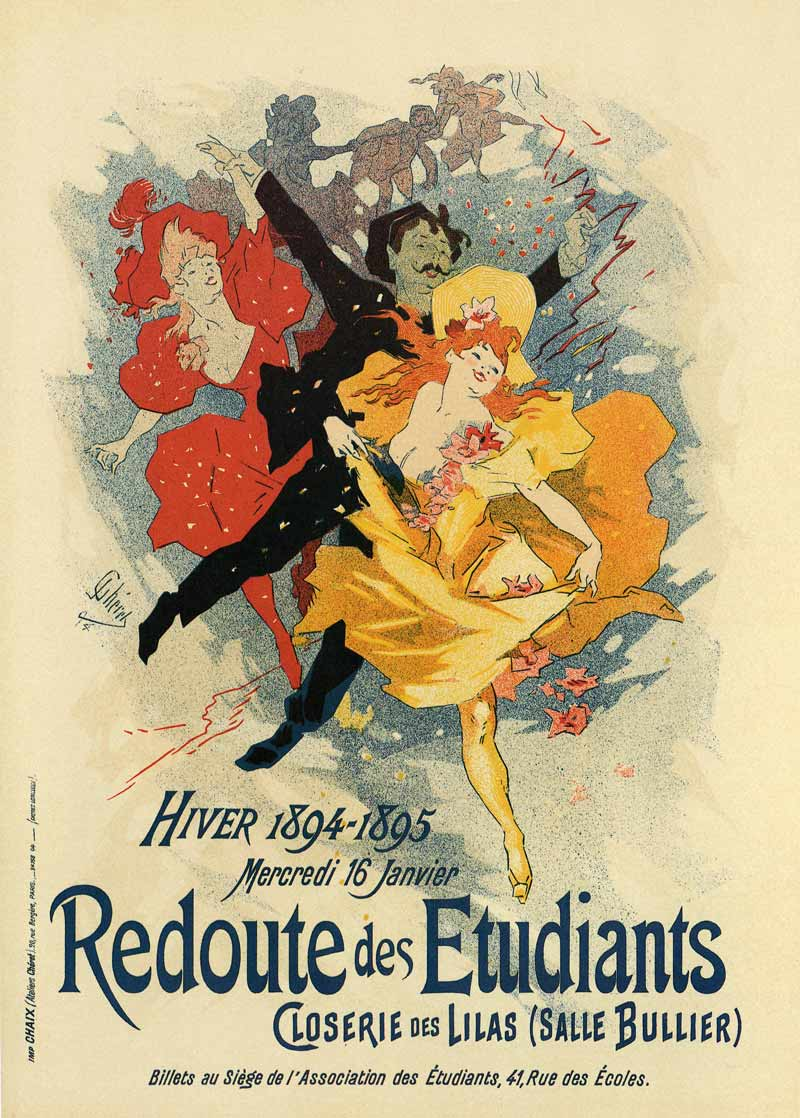
Poster of the Bal Bullier, 1894.

== In popular culture ==
Sonia Delaunay's Bal Bullier is a painting known for both its use of color and movement.

The three-act lyrical comedy La Rondine by Italian composer Giacomo Puccini, premiered in 1917 at the Monte Carlo Opera House, takes place in the second act in the Bal Bullier.

Closerie des lilas by Charles Vernier, 1847.

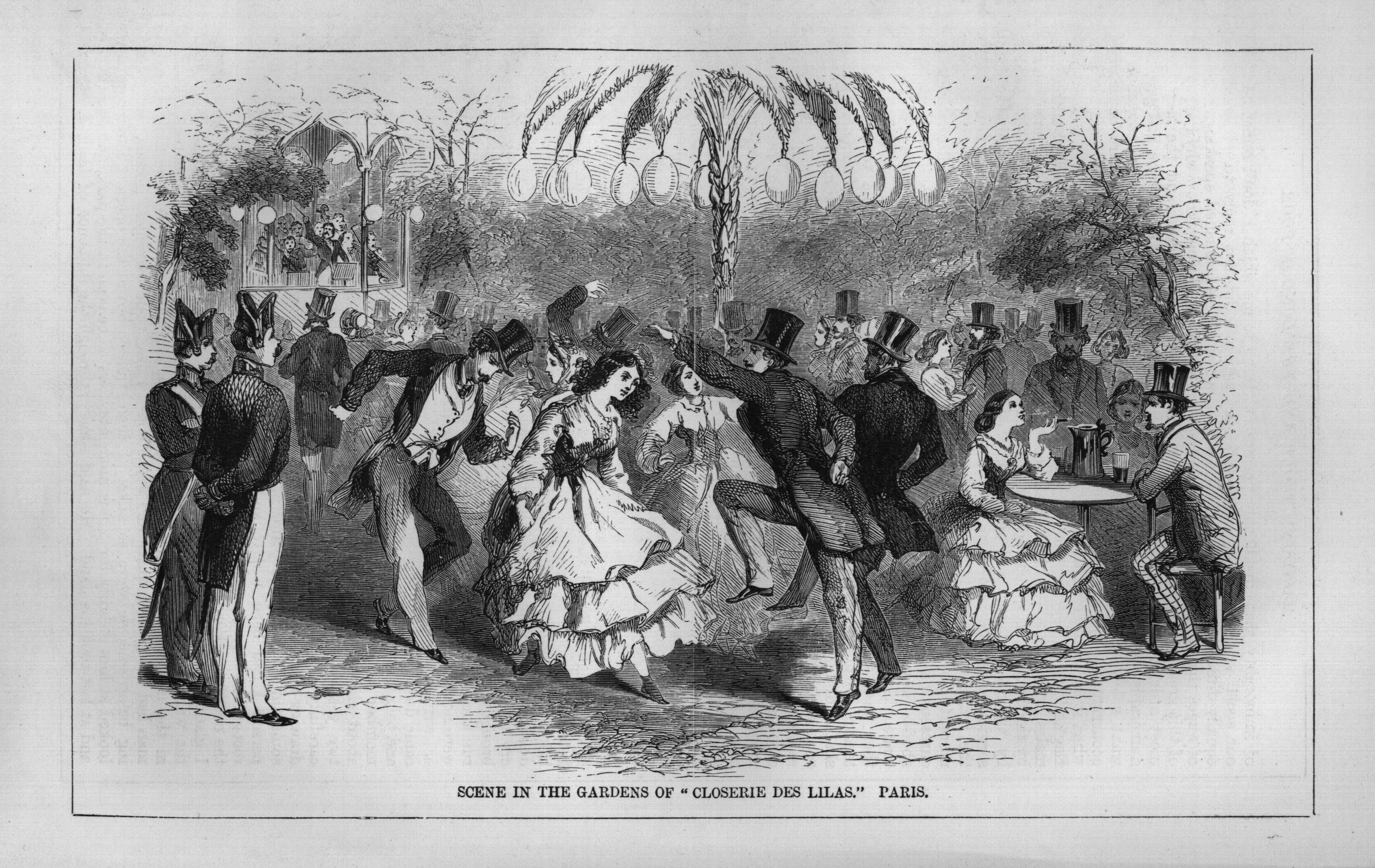
Scene in the Gardens of Closerie Des Lilas, Paris, 1851.

Le Bal Bullier by A. Provost and Auguste Bry, 1860–1869.

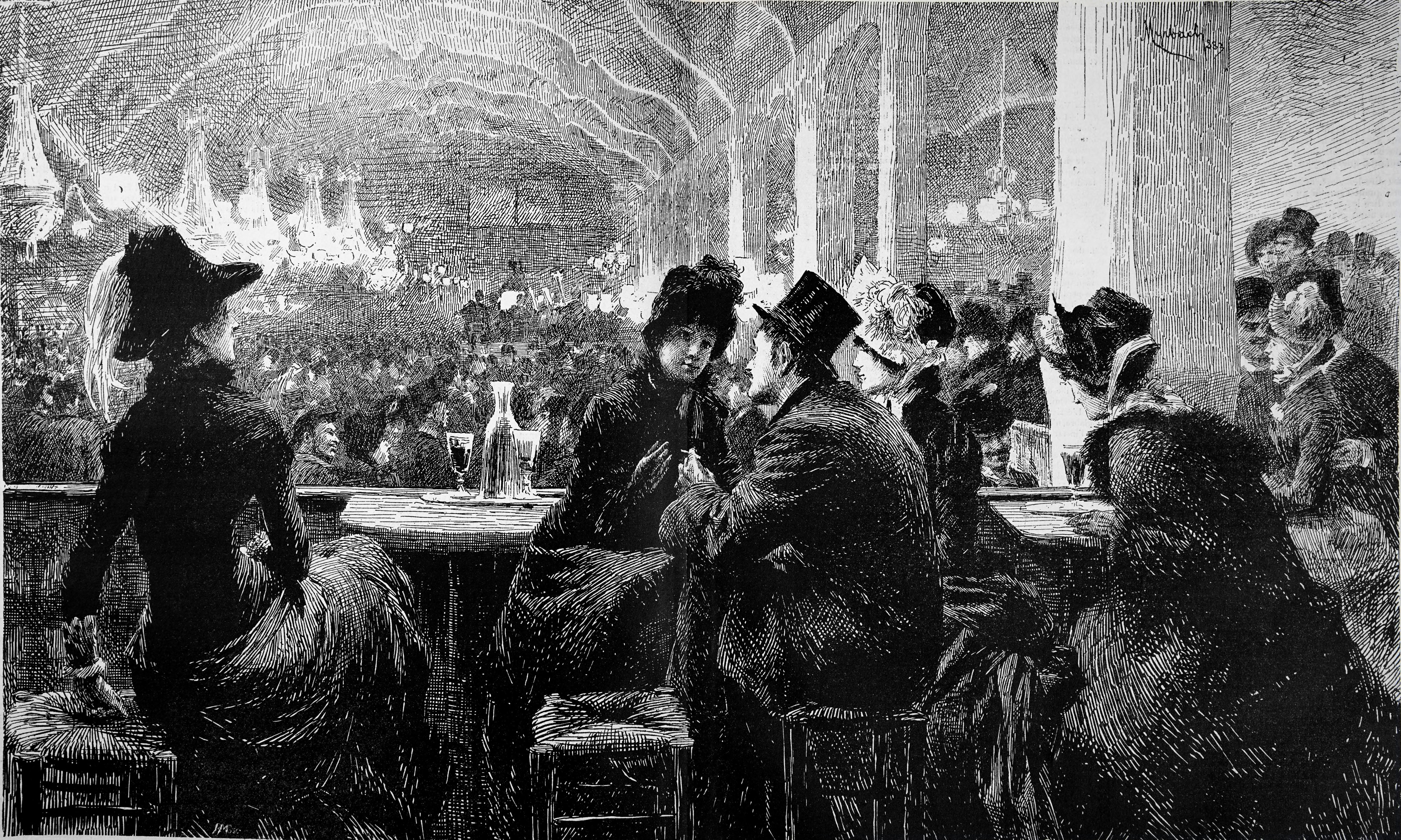
Le Bal Bullier, drawing from life by Myrbach, 1882.

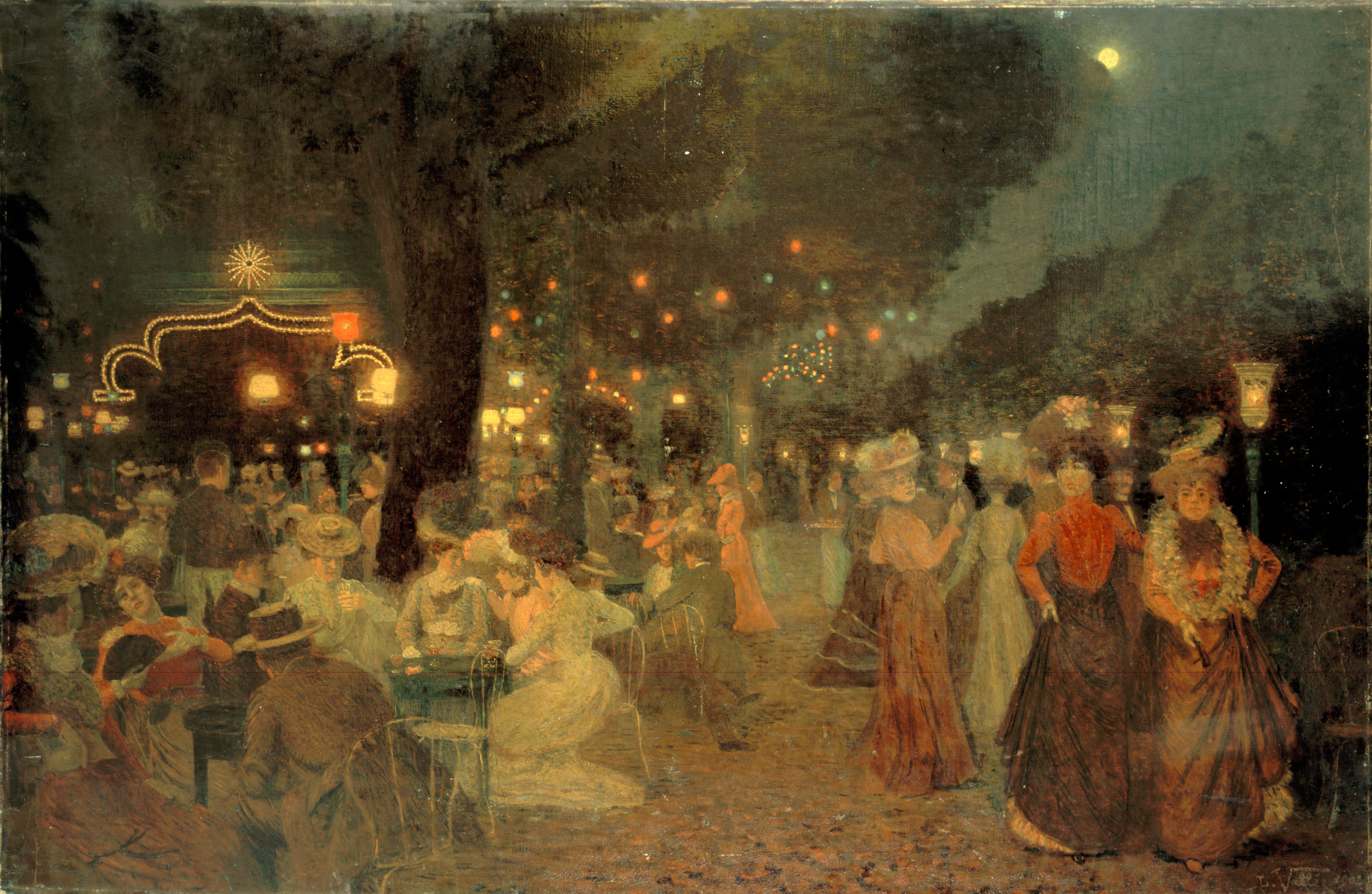
Le jardin du bal Bullier, la nuit by Ludovic Vallet, 1902.

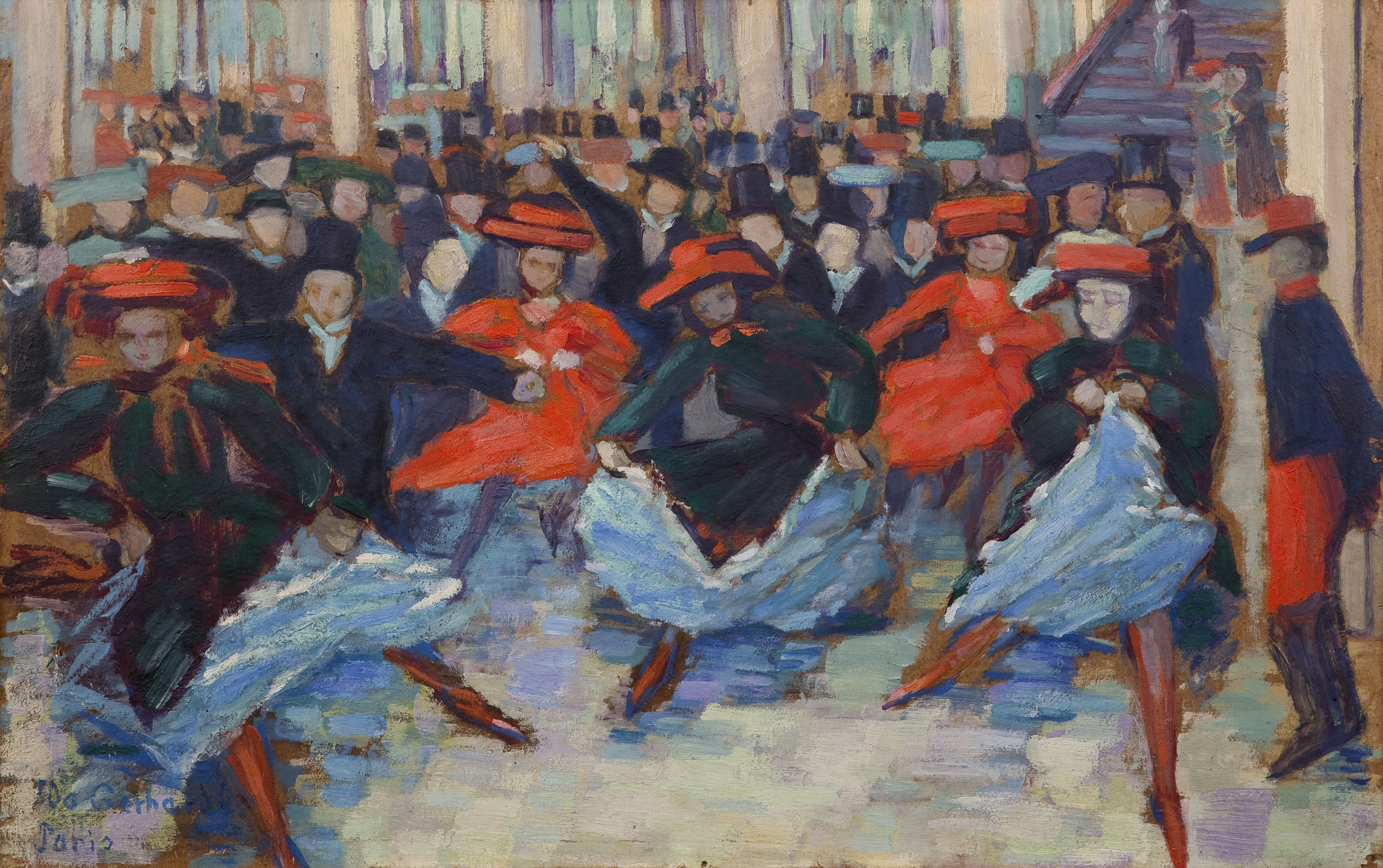
Danseuses cancan in Bullier by Ida Gerhardi, 1904.

== Bibliography ==
- Eastman, Barrett; Mayer, Frédéric (1899). Paris, 1900: The American Guide to City and Exposition (Public domain ed.). Baldwin & Eastman.
- Fitch, Noel R. (15 March 1992). Walks In Hemingway's Paris: A Guide To Paris For The Literary Traveler. St. Martin's Press. ISBN 978-0-312-07113-4.
