= Romance Tour =

Romance Tour may refer to:

- Romance Tour (Luis Miguel), 1991 tour by Luis Miguel
- The Romance Tour, 2020 tour by Camila Cabello
