= Romantic Symphony =

Among the pieces of music with the title Romantic Symphony are:

- Symphony No. 4 (Bruckner) (Romantische), WAB 104, by Anton Bruckner, 1874
- Symphony No. 4 (Chávez) (Sinfonía romántica), by Carlos Chávez, 1953
- Symphony No. 2 (Hanson), Opus 30, by Howard Hanson, 1930
