= Romantic Comedy =

Romantic comedy is a genre that blends romance and comedy.

Romantic Comedy may also refer to:

- Romantic Comedy (play), a 1979 play written by Bernard Slade
  - Romantic Comedy (1983 film), a 1983 film adapted from the play
- Romantic Comedy (2010 film), a 2010 Turkish film, also known as Romantik Komedi
- Romantic Comedy (2019 film), a 2019 documentary about romantic comedies

== See also ==
- Romedy Now, Indian television channel
