= Scandinavian romanser =

Classical art songs, equivalent to the German Lied

The Scandinavian romans, plural romanser, is a classical music art song equivalent to the German Lied, French mélodie or Russian romance.

== Term ==
The term romans is Swedish, plural romanser, and in Swedish (sv:Romans (musik)) applies also to the German Lied.
