= Rådhusstræde 15 =

Historic building in Copenhagen, Denmark

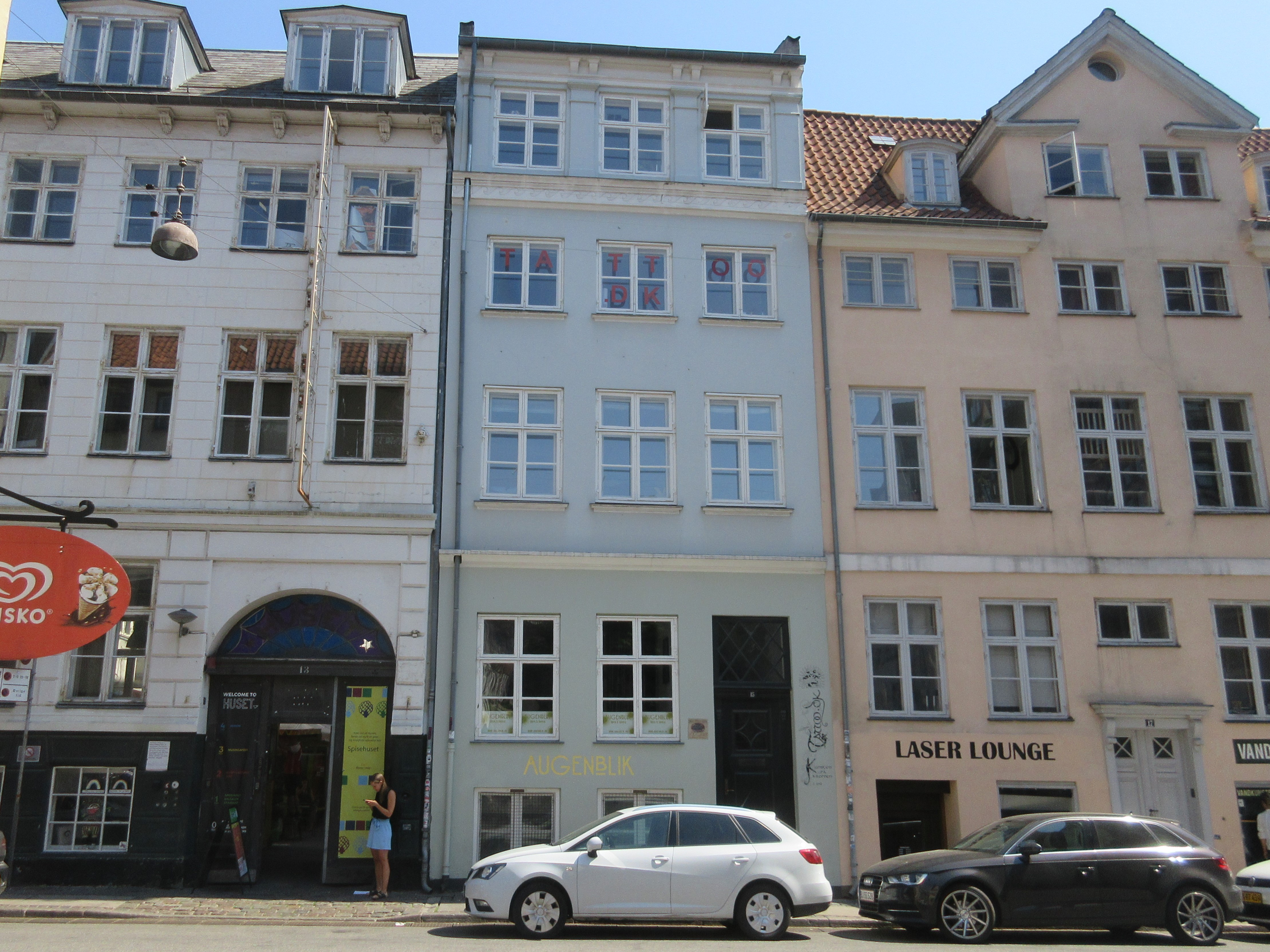
- Interactive map of the Rådhusstræde 15 area

General information
- Location: Copenhagen, Denmark coordinates = 55°40′34.79″N 12°34′29.28″E
- Completed: 1732
- Renovated: 1888 (heightened)

Rådhusstræde 15 is a narrow, early 18th-century property situated on Rådhusstræde, opposite the small square Vandkunsten, in the Old Town of Copenhagen, Denmark. It was listed in the Danish registry of protected buildings and places in 1945. Dyrenes Beskyttelse (Animal Protection Denmark), Denmark's first and largest non-profit animal welfare organization, was also based in the building in the first half of the 20th century.

== History ==
=== 18th century ===
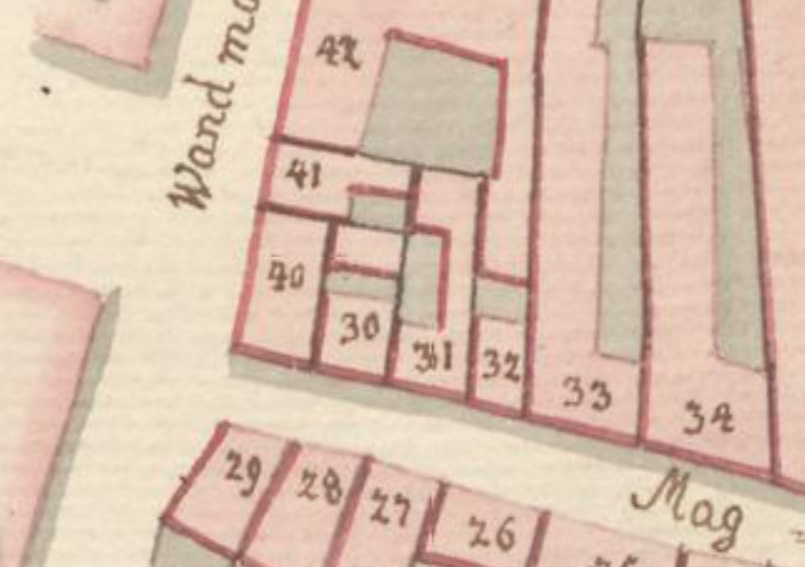
No. 41 seen on a detail from Christian Gedde's map of Snaren's Quarter, 1757.

The property was listed as No. 47 in Snaren's Quarter in Copenhagen's first cadastre of 1689. It was at that time owned by skipper Christen Christensen. The current building on the site was constructed in 1730–1732 for master hatter Niels Jørgensen Egholm. The property was listed as No. 41 in the new cadastre of 1756 and was then still owned by him. This section of Rådhusstræde was known at this point as Vandmøllestræde (Watermill Street).

Priest and theologian writer Christian Bastholm (1740–1819) was among the residents of the building in 1779–1780.

At the time of the 1787 census, the property was home to four households. Christian Brink, a master tailor, resided in the building with his wife Karen Alstrup, their two sons (one of them from her first marriage) and a maid. Another household consisted of pensioner Jørgen Bagger and a maid. Friderik Ernst Horst, a naval officer with the rank of captain, resided in the building with his wife Anne Holm, their two daughters (aged eight and eleven) and a maid. Anne Magrethe Lundholm, a 60-year-old widow who made a living from selling milk, cream and bread, resided in the building with her brother's 11-year-old daughter.

=== 19th century ===
At the time of the 1801 census, the property was home to a total of 11 people distributed among three households. Hans Christian Brinch, Superintendent of Victualling (proviantforvalter), resided in the building with his wife Susanne Mein, their four-year-old daughter Karen Kirstine Brinch, maid Kirstine Bejerholm and sisters Catrine Kirstine Sporon (1742–1820) and Elisabeth Kirstine Sporon (1746–1820). The two Sporon sisters came from a prominent family. Their late father was a professor and rector of Køge Latin School, their brother Benjamin Georg Sporon (1741–1796) had served as tutor for Crown Prince Frederick (IB), and their other brother, Friderich Gottlieb Sporon (1749–1811), was a Supreme Court justice. They would both later retire to Budolfi Kloster, an endowment for unmarried Protestant women. The second household consisted of master clockmaker Hans Friedebech, his wife Karen Larsdatter and his brother and fellow clockmaker Georg Friedebech. The last household consisted of hearse coachman Hans Hansen and his wife Dorothea Andersdatter.

The property was listed as No. 39 in the new cadastre of 1806. It was owned by Nathan Jacob at this point.

The property was home to a total of 13 people at the time of the 1840 census. Brothers Hans and Georg Friedebech were still living together in the ground-floor apartment. Hans Friedebeck was by then a widower. Georg Friedebeck, on the other hand, had married and was living in the building with his wife Mette née Svendsen and their five children (aged 5 to 15). Niece Cathrine Magrethe Worbeck and a maid were also part of the Friedebach brothers' household. Christiane Cathrine Petersen, a widow employed with needlework, resided on the second floor. Hans Hansen, a royal stableman, resided in the basement with his wife Gulden Marie Nielsen.

The property was home to a total of 20 people at the time of the 1860 census. 65-year-old Mette Friedebech was still residing in the ground floor apartment with her four unmarried children (aged 20 to 35). Two of the three sons were clockmakers and the third one was a mechanician. Emma Olsen née Scheel, a 25-year-old divorced fashion retailer, was also living on the ground floor with a maid. Siver Poulsen, a master shoemaker, resided in the basement with his wife Johanne Poulsen and their three children (aged 10 to 22). Levy Henriques, an equestrian (berider), resided on the second floor with his wife Clemmentin Henriques and their daughter Emilie (aged 15). The other second floor apartment was occupied by the widow of a customs officer named Meyer and her two children (aged 10 and 20). Christiane Sophie Salling, a 57-year-old unmarried woman employed with needlework, resided on the third floor. Ludvig Nicolai Møllenberg, a 36-year-old clockmaker, also resided on the third floor.

Rudolph Conradsen, a conservator at the University of Copenhagen, was together with his housekeeper (husjomfru) and a maid the only residents of the building in 1880.

=== 20th century ===
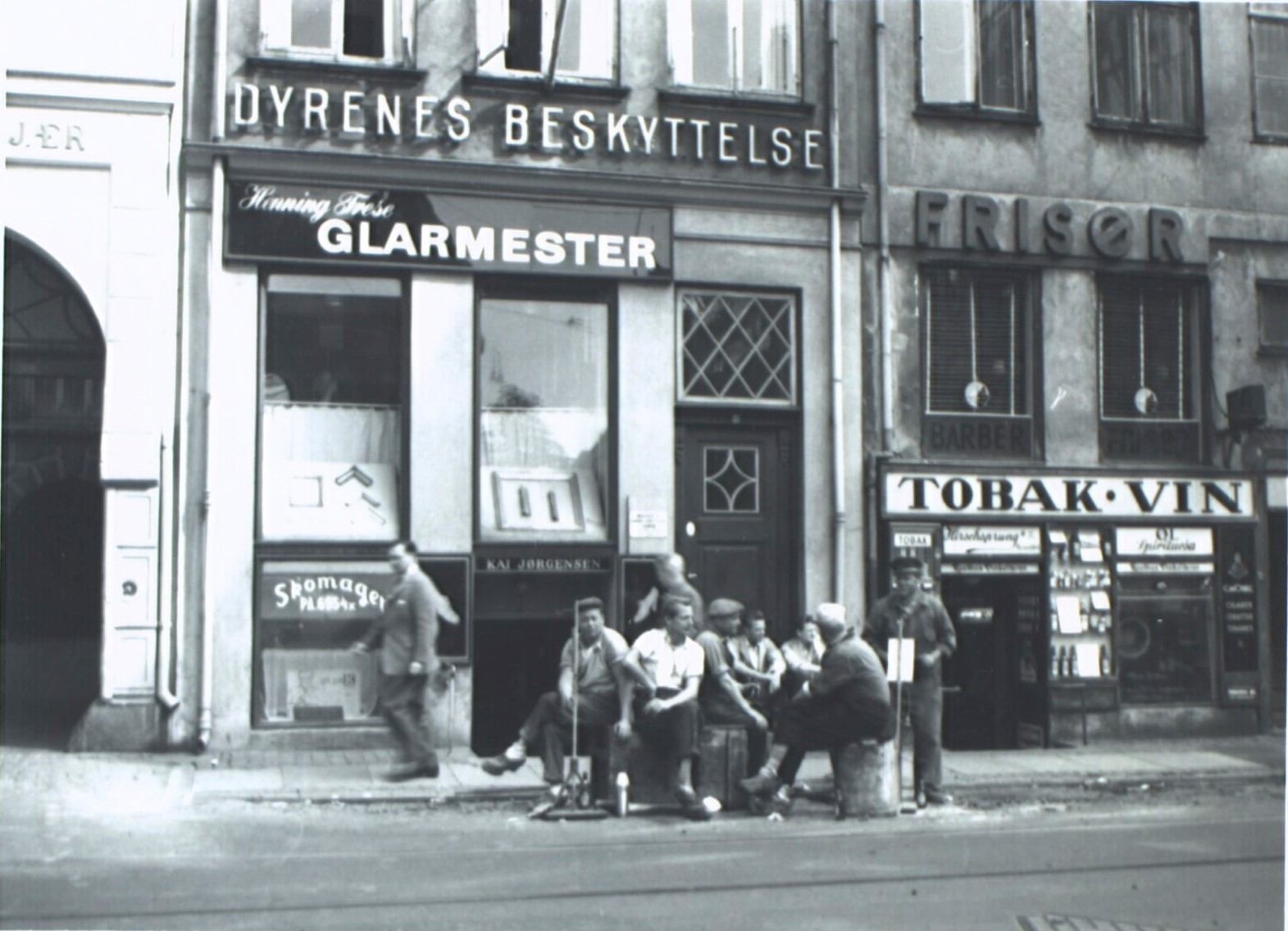
No. 15 with adverts for the glazier's business and Dyrenes Beskyttelse on the façade.

G. Hemmingsen's Eftf., a glazier's business founded on 3 April 1866 by J. Feigh (died 1887) and later continued by his widow, was based in the building in the first half of the 20th century. The firm was continued by Valdemar Petersen from 1894 and by E. Guhle from 1903. In 1909, it was acquired by G. Hemmingsen (1871–1913). It was continued by his widow Marie Hemmingsen after his death. From 1918 until 1 October 1928, Jens Tonsgaard was a partner in the firm. The firm was acquired by Henning Frese (born 1914) on 1 October 1935. It was based in the building until at least the 1950s.

Dyrenes Beskyttelse (Animal Protection Denmark), Denmark's first and largest non-profit animal welfare organization, was also based in the building in the first half of the 20th century.

The property was home to just five people at the time of the 1906 census. Larsen Emma Mathilde, a widow working for Dyrenes Beskyttelse, resided on the first floor with her two daughters. At least one of the two daughters was also employed by Dyrenes Beskyttelse doing office work. Albert Heymann and Hedvig Lindemann, two young Germans, resided on the ground floor.

== Architecture ==
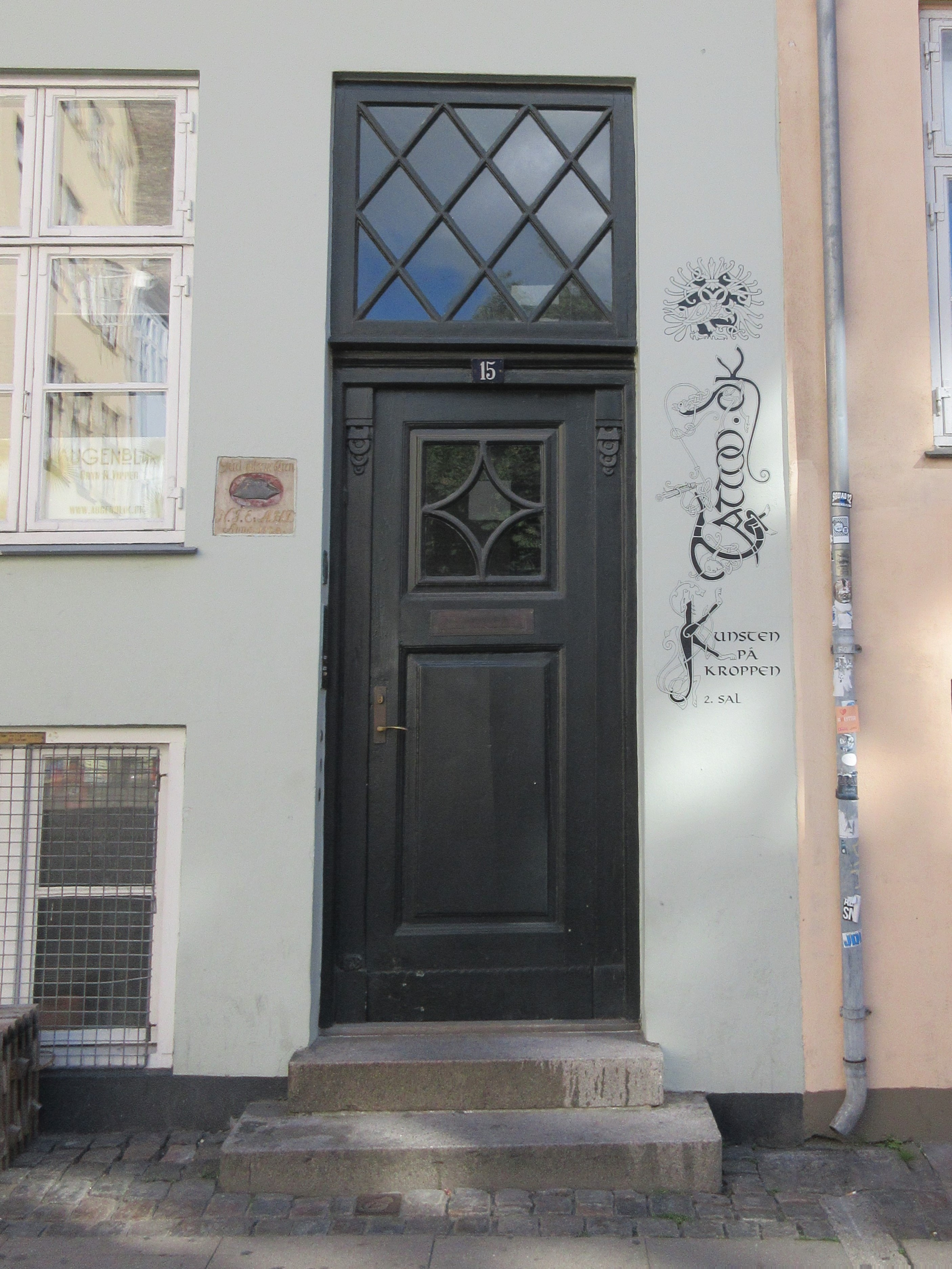
The main entrance

Rådhusstræde 15 is constructed with four storeys over a walk-out basement and is just three bays wide. The façade of the building was originally crowned by a gable, which was replaced by a full fourth storey in connection with a renovation of the building in 1888. The plastered façade is finished with a belt course between the ground floor and first floor, another one between the third and fourth floor, a sill course below the windows of the fourth floor and a cornice supported by corbels arranged in pairs below the roof. The main entrance is topped by a large transom window. Next to the main entrance is a plaque with the inscriptions "N. J. E.", a relief of a hat and the year "Anno 1729", commemorating master hatter Niels Jørgensen Egholm for whom the building was constructed. A four-bay, half-timbered perpendicular wing extends from the rear side of the building along the north side of a diminutive courtyard (light well) bounded on the other sides by some of the neighboring properties.The perpendicular wing is constructed with moderate cantilever on each storey.

== Today ==
The building was owned by Danmarks Lærerforenings Særlige Fond as of 2008.

== Gallery ==
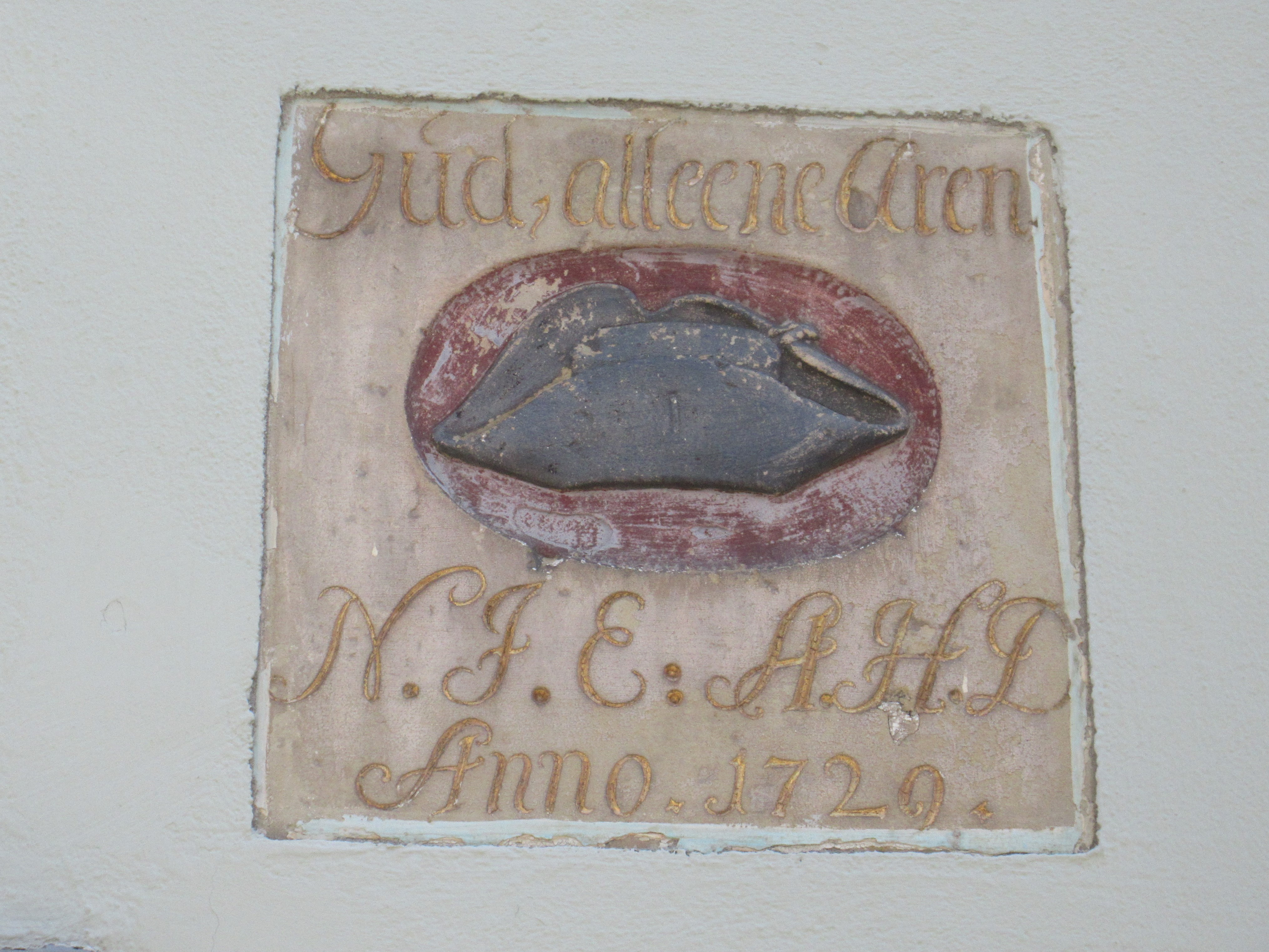
The plaque next to the main entrance.

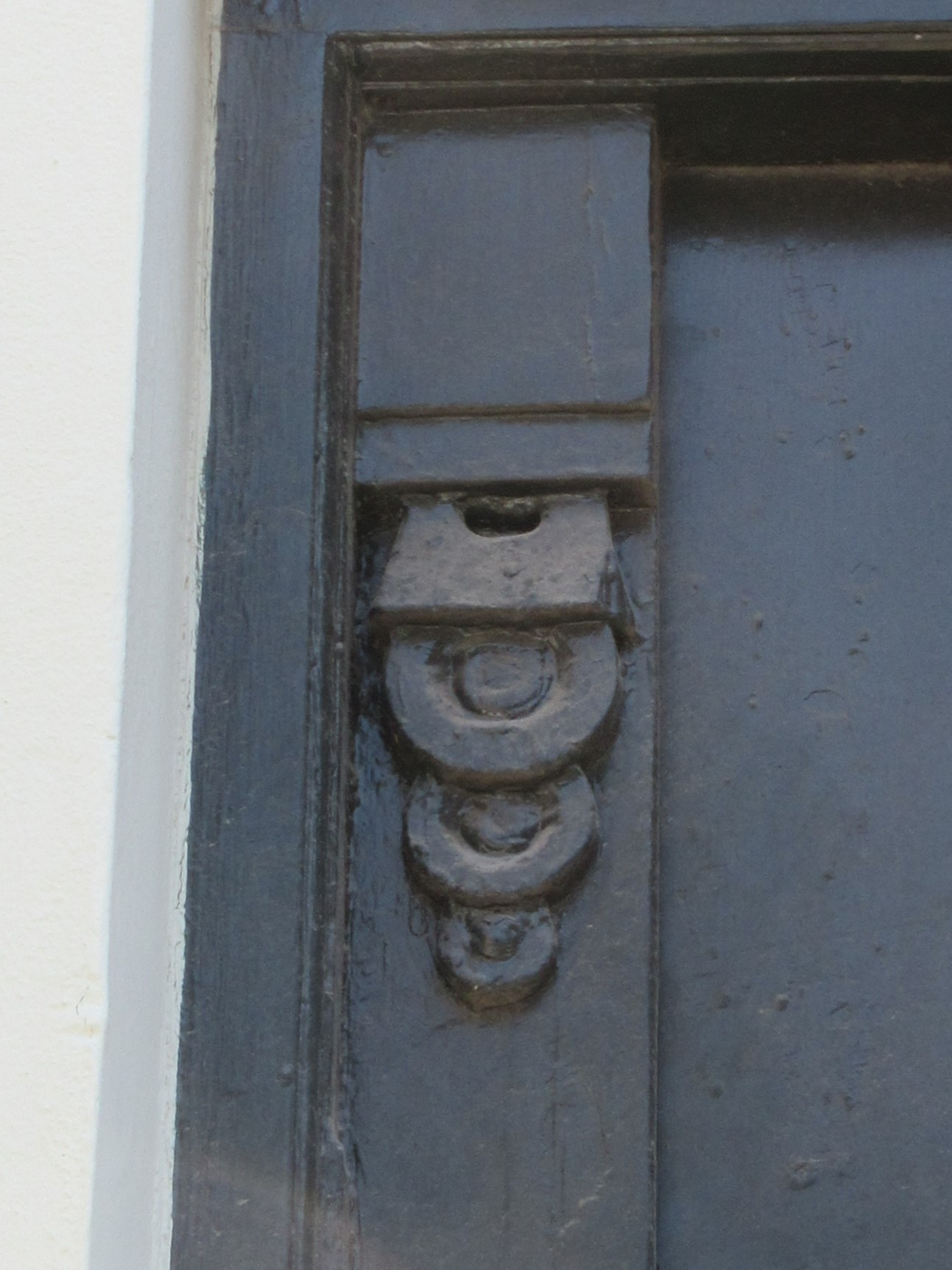
Detail of the door.
