= Ording House =

Apartment building in Copenhagen, Denmark

- Ordings Gård
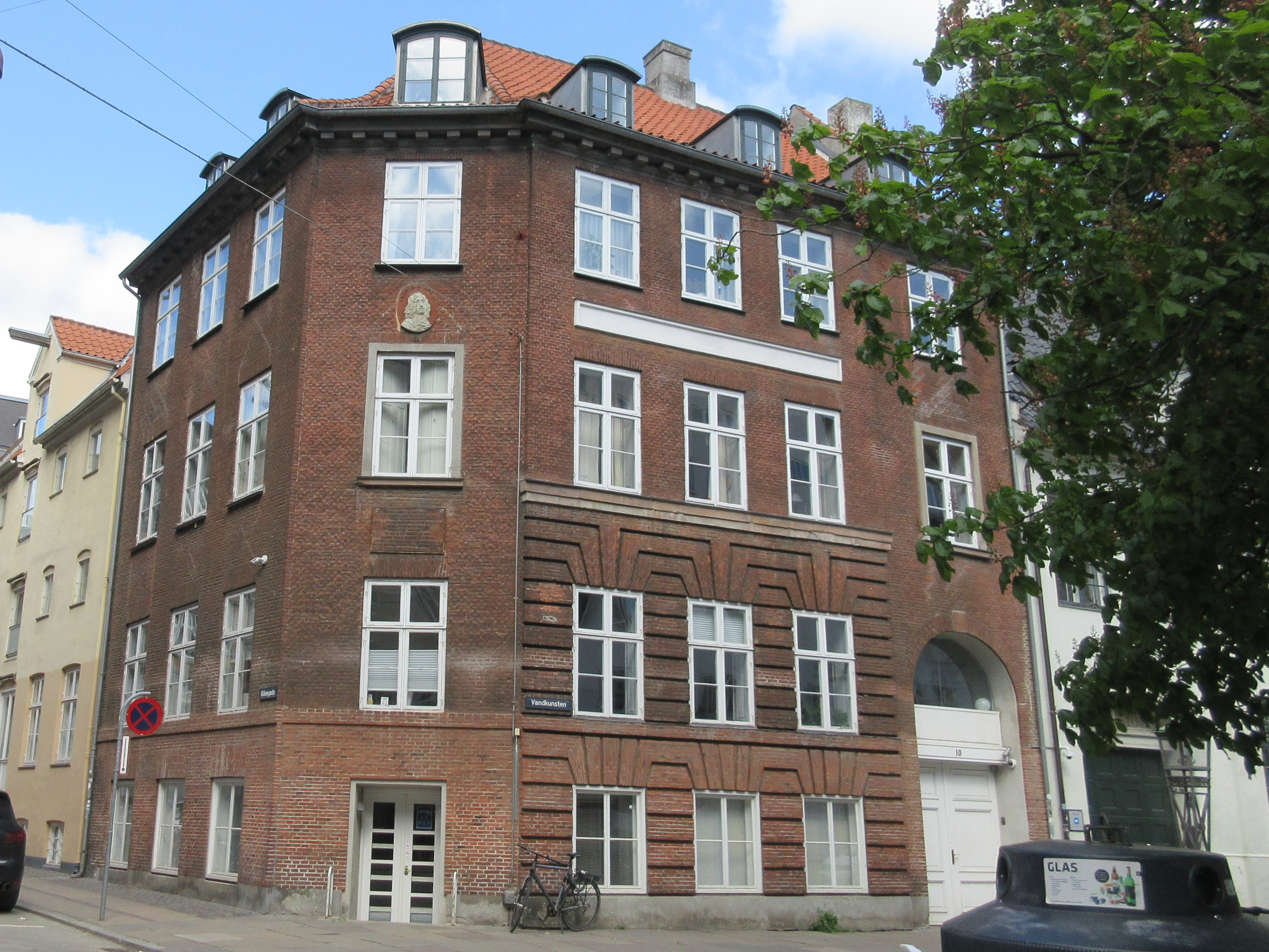
- The Ording House in 2019
- Interactive map of the Ording House area

General information
- Architectural style: Neoclassical
- Location: Vandkunsten 10; Copenhagen, Denmark
- Coordinates: 55°40′33.96″N 12°34′25.68″E
- Completed: 1802

The Ording House is a Neoclassical apartment building situated at the corner of the small square Vandkunsten No. 10 and the street Gåsegade in the Old Town of Copenhagen, Denmark. It takes its name after Carl Henrik Ording, a horse trader and property investor for whom it was built in 1803. It was listed in the Danish registry of protected buildings and places in 1945. Notable former residents include the naval officer Carl Wilhelm Jessen.

== History ==
=== 18th century ===
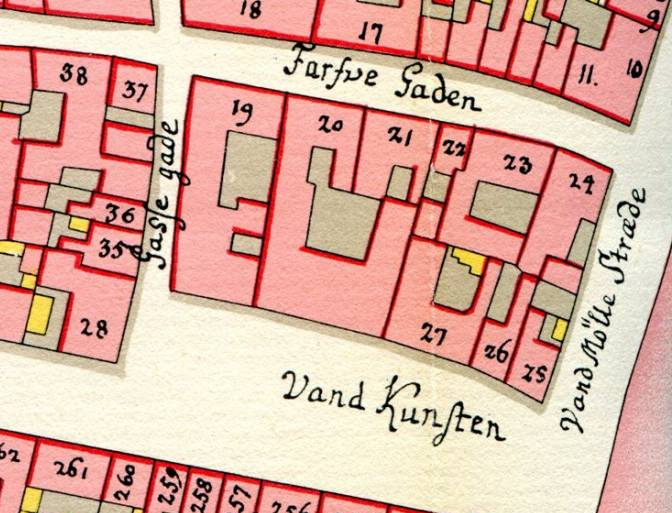
No. 231 and No. 19 seen on a detail from Christian Gedde's map of Copenhagen's West Quarter, 1757.

The site was originally part of the same property as Kompagnistræde 43 on the other side of the block 10. The large property was listed in Copenhagen's first cadastre of 1689 as No. 20 in the city's West Quarter (Vester Kvarter), owned by one Ole Jensen at that time. A brewery was operated on the property from at least the middle of the 18th century. The property was listed in the new cadastre of 1756 as No. 19 and belonged to brewer Gunder Nielsen's widow.

The brewery was later acquired by Andreas Holck (1725–1803). At the time of the 1787 census, he resided on the property with his wife Ane Margrete Krag, their six children (aged five to 16), the wife's 13-year-old niece Hedwig Krag, a maid, a boy, three brewery workers and lodger Christian Asbach (student).

=== Ording and Wolff families ===
The property was later sold to Carl Henrik Ording (1740s-1826), a former horse trader and property investor. He had owned Bakkehuset in Valby from 1777 to 1784. He constructed the inn Slotskroen at the corner of Vesterbrogade and Pile Allé in 1780–82. He had purchased a piece of land in the area between Værnedamsvej, Frederiksberg Allé and Gammel Kongevej in 1783 and constructed the country houses Vennerslyst (Frederiksberg Allé 8, now No. 12-22) and Alléenlyst (later Sankt Thomas) on it the following year. He later sold most of the land off in lots.

In the early1800s, Ording sold the portion of his property that faced Kompagnistræde to Johan Friderich Foltmar (1757–1821), a son of composer Johan Foltmar. In 1802–03, Ording constructed a new building on the remainder of his property.

Ording's property was listed in the new cadastre of 1806 as No. 150B. Foltmar's property was listed as No. 150A.

Ording was married to Maren Wolff, Her brother Jens Wolff and nephew Lars Wolff were both horse traders from Vesterbro. In c. 1821, Ording sold the property for 12,000Rigsdaler to Lars Wolff's son Niels. His unmarried sister Frethe had the previous year purchased the adjacent property No, 150A for 13,000 rigsdaler.

In c. 1826, Niels Wolff parted with No. 150B after purchasing No. 250 in Snaren's Quarter (now Nørregade6&Dyrløb 2).

Carl Wilhelm Jessen (1764–1823), a naval officer who reached the rank of counter admiral, resided in one of the apartments from 1817 to 1819.

=== Later history ===
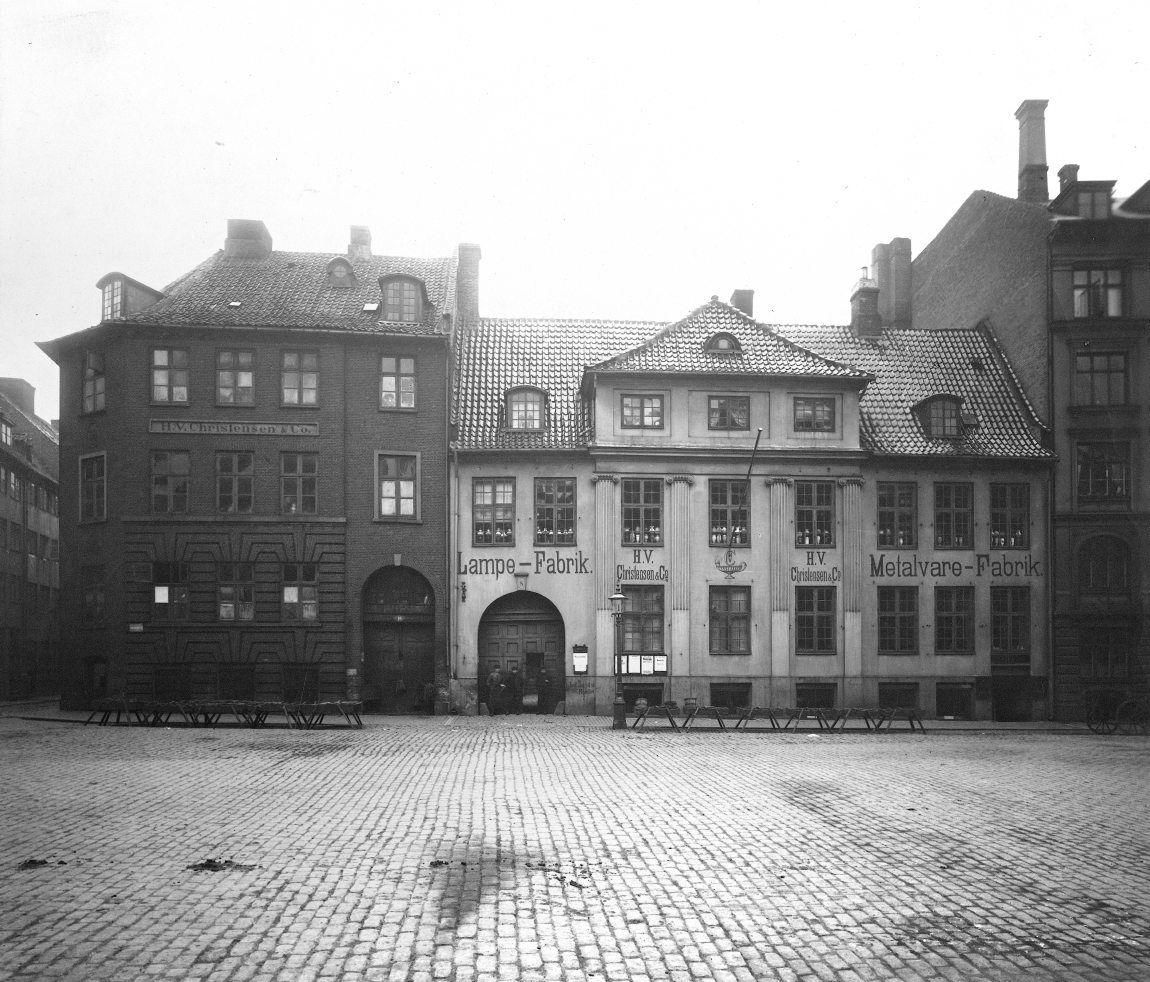
The building in 1898.

At the time of the 1840 census, No. 150 B was home to four households. M. M. Funch, widow of a justitsråd, resided on the ground floor with a housekeeper (husjomfru) and a maid. Herman Kierulf (1784–1845), a civil servant and publisher, resided on the first floor with his wife Vilhelmine Kjerulff (née Rahnue), two sons (aged 25 and 28) and one maid. Knudsen, a kanvelliråd, resided on the second floor with his wife Cathrine Knudsen (née Lund) and one maid. P. Monstrup, a grocer (høker), resided in the basement with his Maren Monstrup født Bjerring and one lodger.

The conservator Peter Hermann Rasmussen owned the property from 1853 to 1889. He installed the memorial plaque on the corner of the building.

== Architecture ==
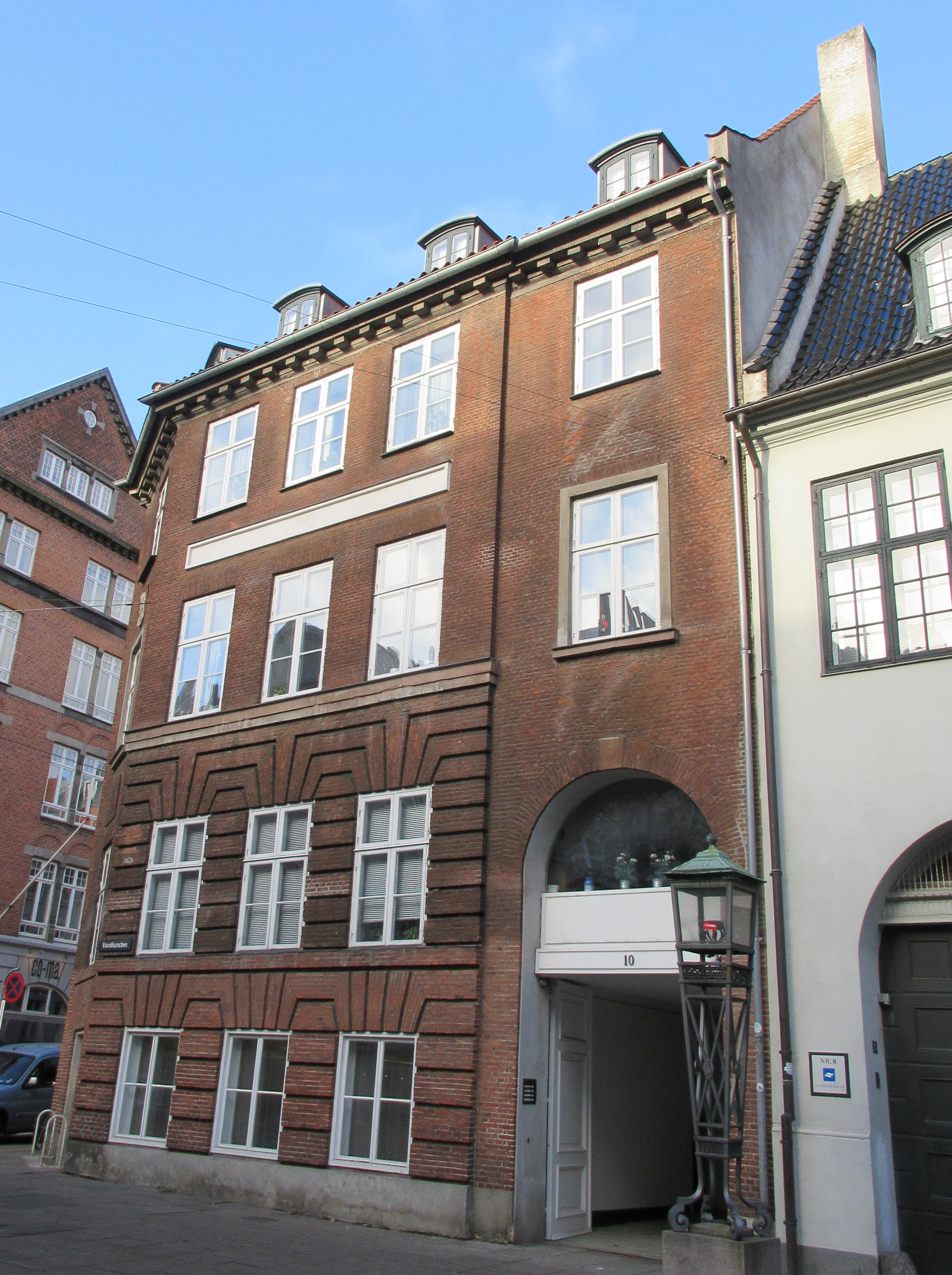
Vandkunsten 10

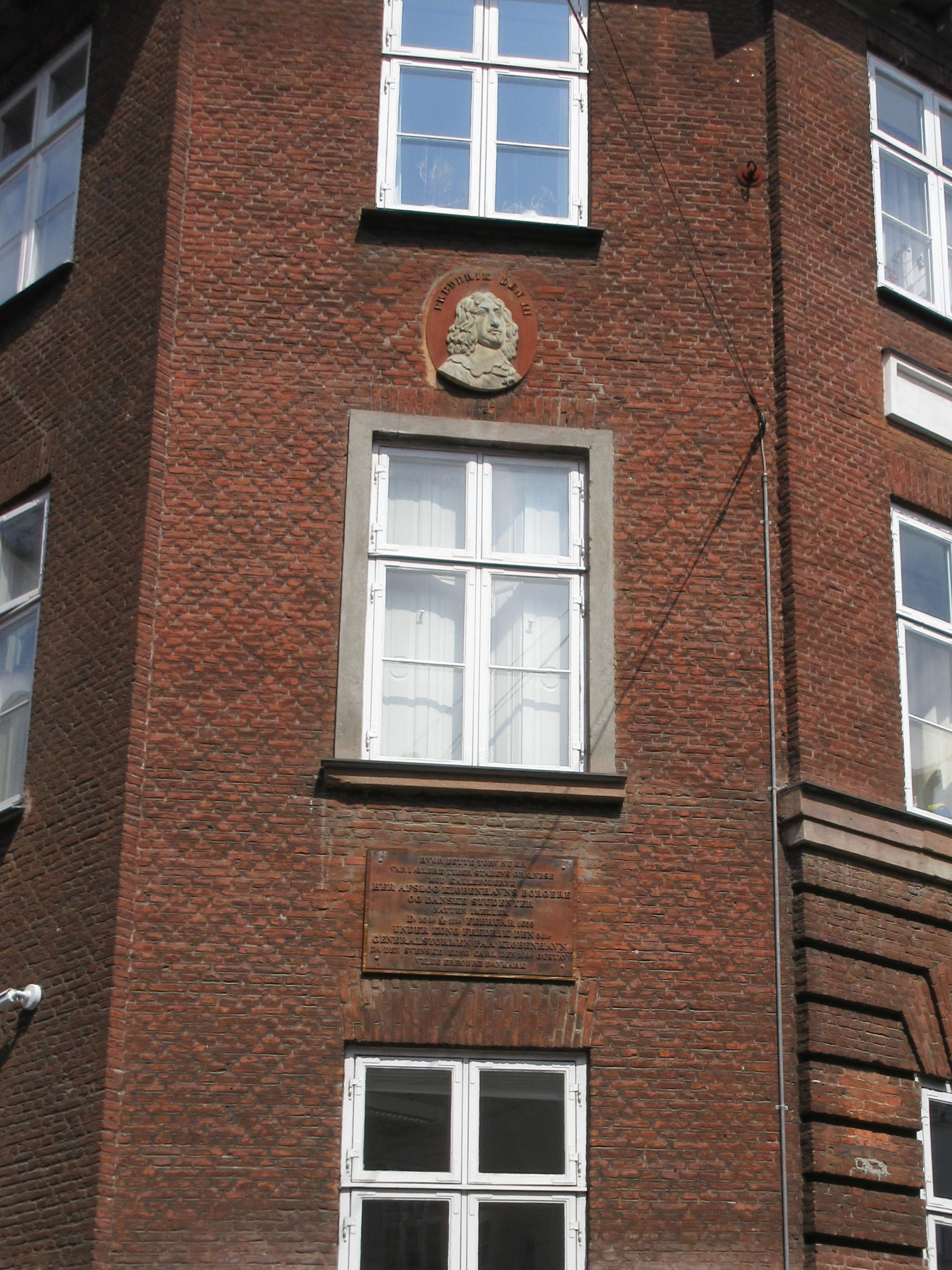
Plaque and relief commemorating the Storm of Copenhagen

The building stands in blank, red brick and consists of three stories over a high cellar. The building has four bays on Vandkunsten, a chamfered corner bay and three bays on Gåsegade. A gateway opens to a courtyard that it shares with the rest of the block.

== Memorial plaque ==
A memorial plaque and a relief of Frederick III on the corner commemorate the Swedish storm assault on Copenhagen which took place on 10–11 February 1659 at this site.

The same event is commemorated by the names Stormgade and Stormbroen.

== See also ==
- Vodroffsvej 10
