= Kompagnistræde 43 =

Historical building in Copenhagen, Denmark

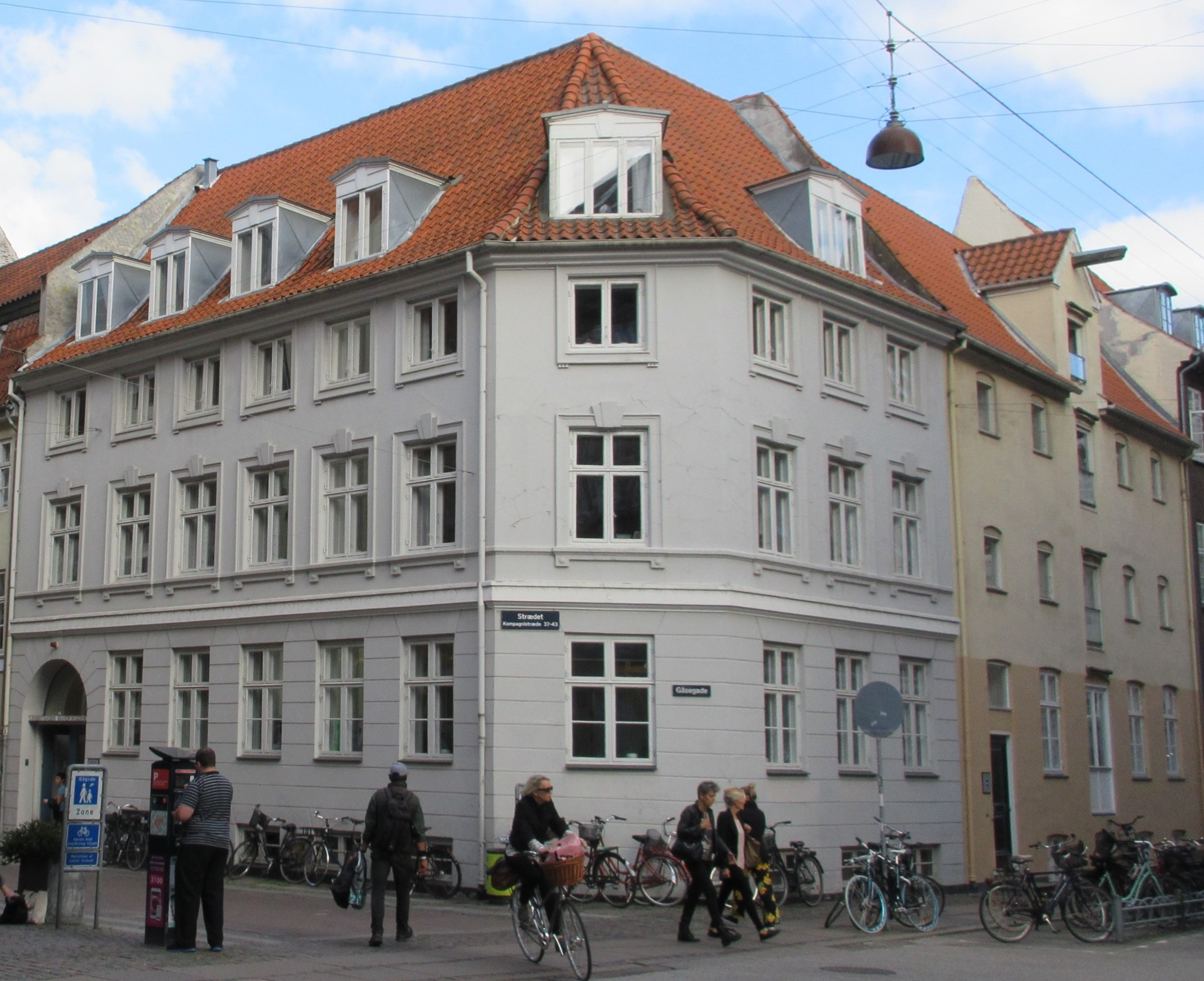
- Interactive map of the Kompagnistræde 43 area

General information
- Location: Copenhagen, Denmark
- Coordinates: 55°40′39.29″N 12°34′12.72″E
- Completed: 1806

Kompagnistræde 43 is an early 19th-century property situated at the corner of Kompagnistræde and Gåsegade in the Old Town of Copenhagen, Denmark. It consists of a three-storey corner building with a principal facade on Kompagnistræde and a five-bay warehouse in Gåsegade. The complex was listed in the Danish registry of protected buildings and places in 1945. Notable former residents include the writer Meir Goldschmidt. The building is presently owned by Jeudan.

== History ==
=== 18th century ===
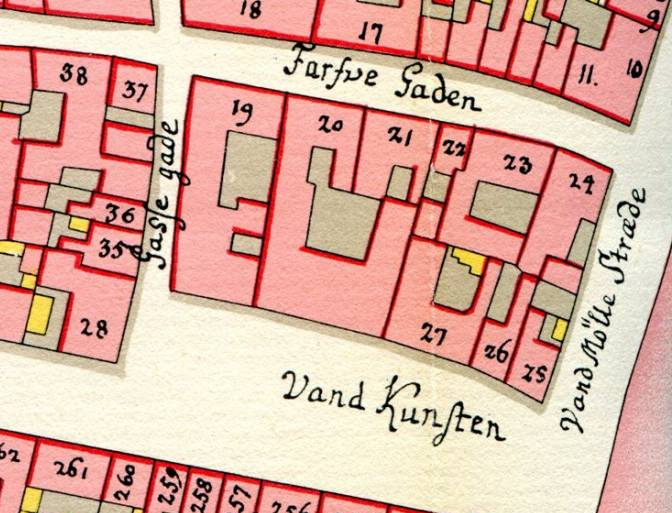
No. 231 and No. 19 seen on a detail from Christian Gedde's map of Copenhagen's West Quarter, 1757.

The site was originally part of the same property as Vandkunsten 10. From at least the middle of the 18th century, it was listed as No. 19 in the city's West Quarter (Vester Kvarter) and operated as a brewery. It was owned at that time by brewer Gunder Nielsen and later (1757) by his widow.

The brewery was acquired by Andreas Holck (1725–1803) in around 1770. At the time of the 1787 census, he resided on the property with his wife Ane Margrete Krag, their six children (aged five to 16), the wife's 13-year-old niece Hedwig Krag, a maid, a boy, three brewery workers and lodger Chr.Asbach (student).

In 1794, Holck sold the property to Henrik Ording. In 1802–1803, Henrik Ording constructed a new three-storey building fronting Vandkunsten.

=== Johan Friderich Fortmar and his property ===
In the new cadastre of 1806, Ording's property was listed as No. 150. By then he had already sold the section towards Kompagnistræde to Johan Friderich Foltmar (1757–1821). Foltmar was the son of composer Johan Foltmar. After unsuccessfully pursuing a career in music, he was licensed as a businessman in Copenhagen in 1784. On 24 October 1795, he purchased a windmill on the Ladegården estate in Frederiksberg. In 17887, he constructed a textile factory at the site. In 1791 he also completed a main building on the estate, naming it Mosendahl. On 12 June 1797, he purchased Admiral Gjeddes Gård in Store Kannikestræde. After that, he increasingly engaged in the buying and selling of property. After selling Admiral Giedes Gård again in 1804, he increasingly engaged in property investments.

In 1805–1806, he constructed a new building complex on his lot in Kompagnistræde. It consisted of a three-storey residential corner building and a warehouse in Gåsegade.

=== Falkenskjold and Wolff ===
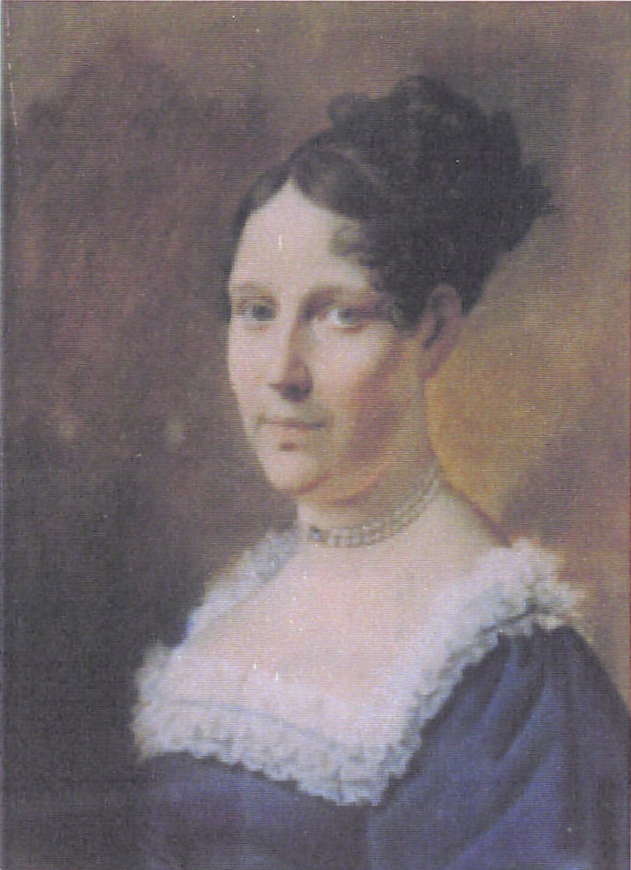
Grethe Wolff

The property was later acquired by Arnoldus von Falkenskiold, a military officer with rank of Colonel turned farmer, who also owned Siohienberg at Gørsholm. The property was after his death, in 1820, by his heirs sold for 13,000rigsdaler to Grethe Wolff. She was the granddaughter of Jens Wolff, eldest brother of Ording's wife Maren (née Wulffsdatter). In c. 1821, Ording's property was sold to her brother Niels Wolff.

=== 1810–1900 ===
At the time of the 1840 census, No. 150 A was home to four households. Johan Anton Stæger, a ship captain, resided on the first floor with his wife Else Magdalene Hansen, her niece Laura Magdalene Antonie Hansen and one maid. Lars Jørgensen Haubye, a civil servant (Betjent ved Contoiret for Reisende), resided on the second floor with his wife Ottine Elisabeth Haubye, their three children (aged three to nine) and one lodger. Christian Frederik Smith, a shoemaker, resided in the basement with his wife Juliane Constance Møller, their three children (aged three to eight), two shoemakers (employees) and one maid. Peter Herløv, a firewood seller, resided in a room behind the stable with his wife Ane Margrethe Herløv and two workmen.

The writer Meir Goldschmidt (1819–1887) was among the residents of the building in 1845.

=== 20th century ===
The businessman (grosserer) John S. Willumsen was among the residents in 1919.

From 1957, Kompagnistræde 43 was part of the 15,000-square-metre (160,000 sq ft) headquarters of the insurance company Lærerstandens Brandforsikring (now LB Forsikring). The rest of the complex was made up of the buildings at Farvergade 2–8 and 17, Kompagnistræde 41, Kompagnistræde 39/Vandkunsten 8 and Vandkunsten 10. S. In 2020, LB Forsikring relocated to new premises at Amerika Plads.

== Architecture ==
The corner building is constructed with three storeys over a walk-out basement. It has a six-bay-long facade on Kompagnistræde, a three-bay-long facade on Gåsegade and a chamfered corner. The latter was dictated for all corner buildings by Jørgen Henrich Rawert's and Peter Meyn's guidelines for the rebuilding of the city after the fire so that the fire department's long ladder companies could navigate the streets more easily. The ground floor of the building is finished with shadow joints below a robust belt course. A gateway furthest to the left in Kompagnistræde opens to a central courtyard. The roof is clad with red tile.

The warehouse in Gåsegade is five bays wide. The facade is topped by a wall dormer with a pulley beam.

== Today ==
In August 2020, Kompagnistræde 43 and the five other LB Forsikring properties were acquired by Jeudan in a transaction of over DKK 400 million.
