= Jacob Wilhelm Frohne =

Danish master mason, architect and art collector (1832–1909)

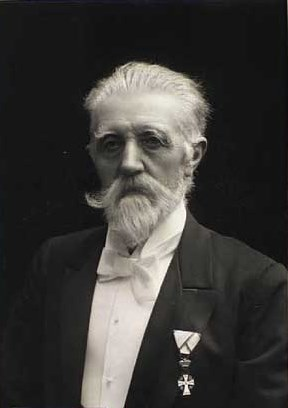
- Born: 15 August 1832; Flensburg, Duchy of Schleswig
- Died: 13 July 1909 (aged 76); Frederiksberg, Denmark
- Citizenship: Danish
- Occupation: Master mason
- Known for: Art collection and writings

Jacob Wilhelm Frohne (15 August 1832 – 13 July 1909), usually referred to as J. W. Frohne was a Danish master mason, architect and art collector. A book about 18th-century Danish faience manufacturers by him was published posthumously in 1910. His two villas at Vodroffsvej 8 and Vodroffsvej 10 were individually listed in the Danish registry of protected buildings and places in 1980.

== Early life and education ==
Frohne was born in Flensburg, the son of master butcher Johan Christian Frohne (1806–1886) and Marie Jürgensen (1808–1889). He attended Flensburg Latin School and was a mason's apprentice from 1849. In 1852, he moved to Copenhagen. In 1853–1854, he went abroad as a journeyman.

== Career ==
Back in Copenhagen, he spent some time working as an executing architect for Niels Sigfred Nebelong before in 1850 setting up his own business as a master mason in Copenhagen. He worked on the construction of Johanne Louise Heiberg's villa in the Tosenvænget neighborhood, Hvidøre and Springforbi north of Copenhagen, Aalborg Cathedral School in Aalborg tand, College of Advanced Technologies and Marstrand's Brewery in Copenhagen.

He was also charged with the construction of three villas at Vodrofvej by Niels Wolff in Frederiksberg.

== Personal life and legacy ==
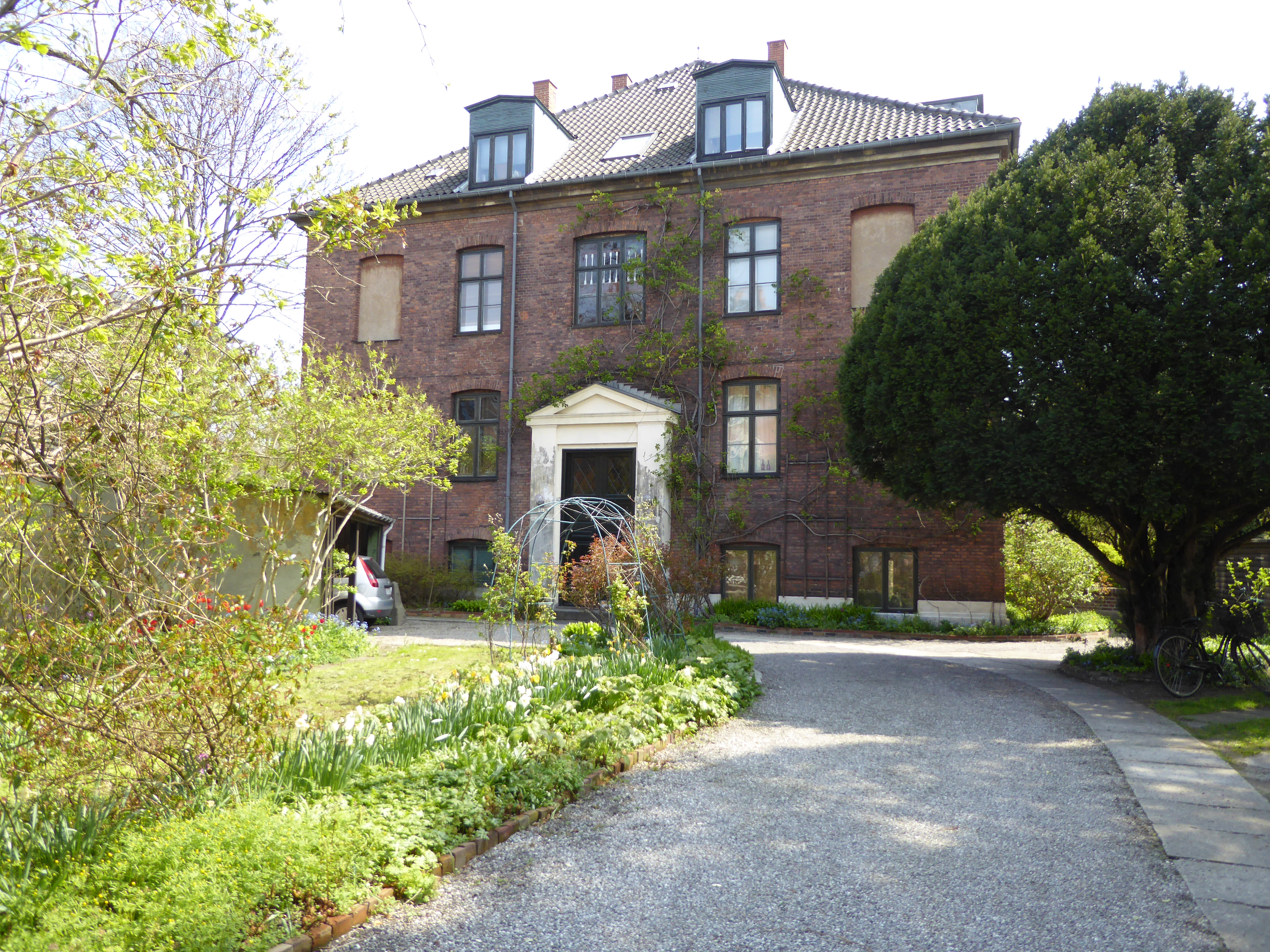
Vodroffsvej 10

Frohne remained unmarried. He was a prolific art collector, especially of faience and porcelain by Danish manufacturers. He died on 13 July 1909 and is buried in Copenhagen's Vestre Cemetery. He bequeathed a substantial part of his collection to the Danish Museum of Arts and Crafts. The rest of the collection was sold at auction at Charlottenburg after his death. The catalogue was created by Emil Hannover. It attracted many international art dealers from a wide range of countries.

Frohne is today above all remembered for his study of 18th century Danish faience. A shortened version of his writings on the matter was published posthumously by C. A. Been in 1911 as Danske Fajancer. Historiske Meddelelser om Fajancefabrikker i Danmark og Hertugdømmerne i det 18. Aarhundrede (1911). The original manuscript, entitled Murermester Frohnes Fremstilling af Fajancernes og Stentøjets Historie, is in the collection of the Royal Danish Library (Ny Kgl. saml. nr. 2789 4°).

One of his three Codrofvejvillas has later been demolished. The two surviving villas at Vodroffsvej 8 and Vodroffsvej 10 were individually listed in the Danish registry of protected buildings and places in 1980.

== Awards ==
Frohne was created a Knight in the Order of the Dannebrog in 1890. In 1909, he was awarded the Cross of Honour.
