= Vodroffsvej 10 =

Listed house in Copenhagen, Denmark

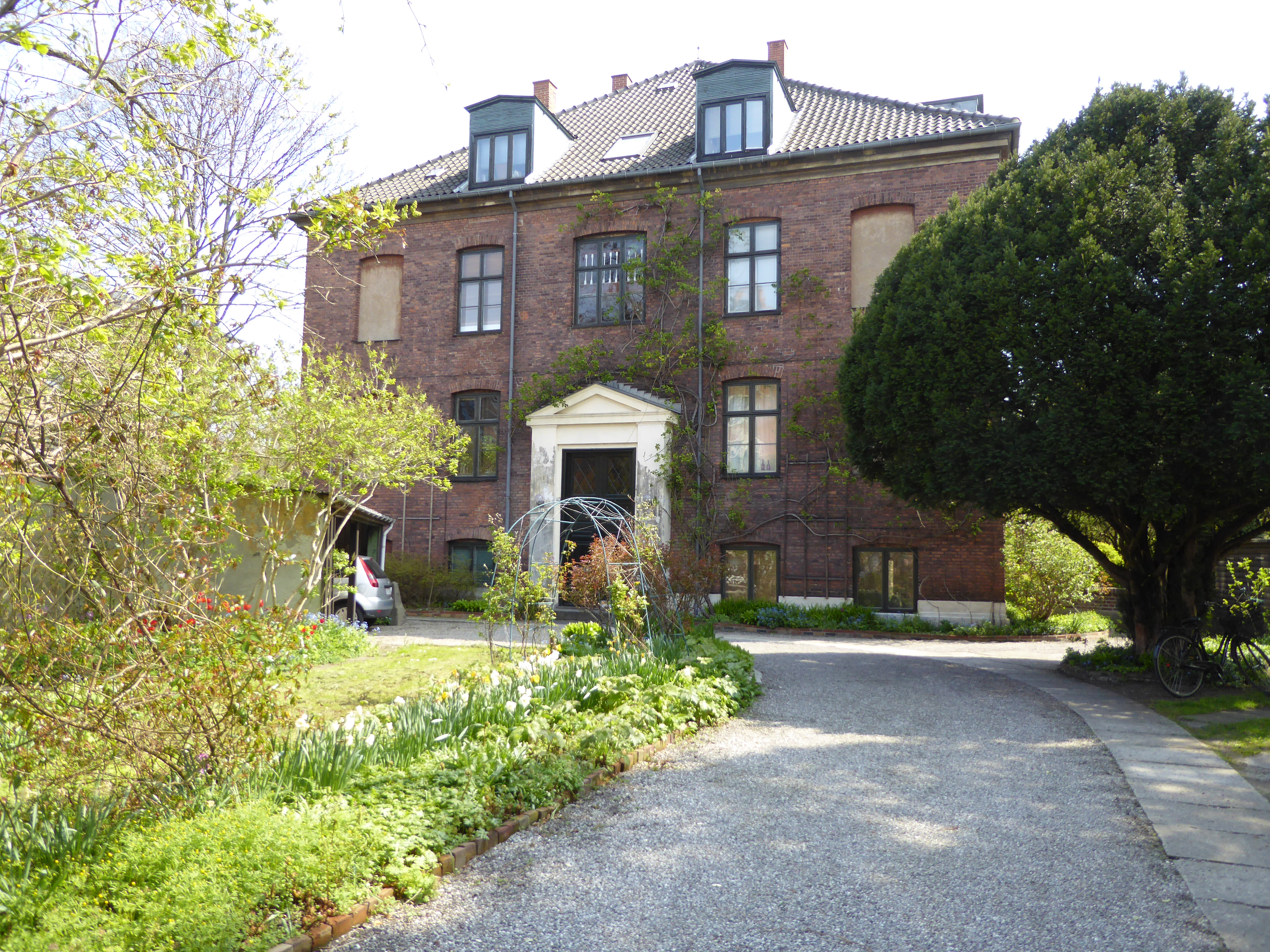
- Interactive map of the Vodroffsvej 10 area

General information
- Location: Copenhagen, Denmark
- Coordinates: 55°40′33.35″N 12°33′16.99″E
- Completed: 1865

Design and construction
- Main contractor: Jørgen Wilhelm Frohne

Vodroffsvej 10 is one of several surviving 19th-century villas situated on the west side of St. Jørgen's Lake in the Frederiksberg district of central Copenhagen, Denmark. Built in 1865, it was one of three villas constructed in the area by master mason and architect Jørgen Wilhelm Frohne (1832-1909) for family members of the owner of nearby Vodroggsgård. An atelier in the garden was constructed in 1882 for the painter Laurits Tuxen, brother-in-law of the next owner and also a resident of the building. Other artists to have used the atelier include Julius Schultz, Hans Gyde Petersen and Daniel Hvidt. The house and atelier were both listed in the Danish registry of protected buildings and places in 1980. The neighboring villa at No. 8 was also constructed by Frohne and is also heritage listed. Bonnie Mürsch—a lawyer whose father purchased the house in 1940 and who is herself still living in one of its three apartments—published a book about it in conjunction with its 150th anniversary in 2015.

== History ==
=== Knud Benjamin Fick ===
The land on the site was formerly part of the Vodroffsgård estate. The estate was acquired by Carl Johan Zinn in 1803. He died in 1808. After the death of his widow Michaeline Arnoldine Megaline (née Skibsted) in 1833 it passed to their daughter and son-in-law Emilie and Niels Wolff. Niels Wolff worked for the Royal Copenhagen Fire Insurance Company. He was the younger brother of businessman and landowner Benjamin Wolff. Emilie Augusta Wolff died just 39 years old in December 1836. Niels Wolff was subsequently married to Louise Seraphine Koch (1811-1893) in 1841.

In 1852, when the so-called demarcation line was moved from Jagtvej to the eastern side of The Lakes, paving the way for redevelopment of the land, some of it was used for the construction of three villas for members of the Wolff family, all of them to designs by the master mason Jacob Wilhelm Frohne (1832-1909). Frohne was around the same time working on the construction of Marstrand's Brewery a little further down the street. The villa at No. 10 was constructed for Wolff's nephew Knud Benjamin Fick, son of Wolff's sister Kirstine. He was married to his cousin Helene Louise Wolff, daughter of Niels Wolff's brother Carl. The neighboring villa at No. 8 was constructed for Wolff's son Niels August Wolff.

Knud Benjamin Fick worked as a treasurer at the Royal Danish Theatre. He and his wife lived on the first floor with two of their children at the time of the 1870 census. Louise Seraphine Wolff (née Koch), who had become a widow in 1862, resided on the ground floor with her daughter Emilie Augusta Wolff. The daughter would later marry the painter Axel Helsted.

=== William Scharling ===
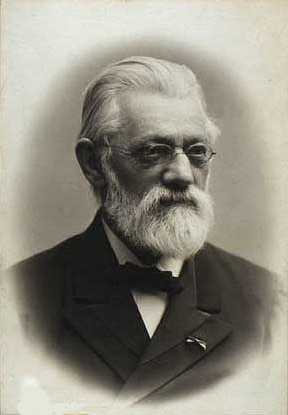
William Scharling

In 1882, Fick sold the house to professor of economy at the University of Copenhagen William Scharling. He was married to Julie Cecilie Tuxen, a daughter of director of Orlogsværftet Nicolai Elias Tuxen and Bertha L. Tuxen (née Giødvad). His parents-in-law resided on the ground floor of the building with some of their other children, including painters Laurits Tuxen and Nicoline Tuxen. An atelier was the same year constructed for Laurits Tuxen in the garden. The building was designed by architect Johan Schrøder. Shortly thereafter, Tuxen was commissioned to paint a monumental group portrait painting of The Family of Christian IX of Denmark. Some of the preliminary sketches and portrait studies for the painting were created in his atelier at Vordroffsvej. He lived at Vordroffsvej 10 with his parents until moving to Paris in 1896. Wiliam and Julie Scharling lived on the first floor with their three children. William Scharling owned the building until his death in 1911.

The sculptor Julius Schultz resided at Vodroffsvej 10 and used the atelier from 1895 to 1908. His statue of Adam Oehlenschläger (now in Søndermarken) was created in 1906. The artist Hans Gyde Petersen has also used the atelier,

=== Mürsch family, 1940–present ===
The manufacturer Johnny Mürsch (1896-1968) purchased the building in 1940. The garret was converted into a third apartment in the 1940s. During Mürsch's ownership the atelier was used for a while by the painter Daniel Hvidt (1889-1975). The house was after Mürsch's death divided into three condominiums, one for each of his three children Bonnie, Judy and Peter. The three condominiums, one on each floor, was owned by them until at least 2010s. One of them is the lawyer Bonnie Mürsch, who served as president of Foreningen til Govedstadens Forskønnelse from 1987 to 1997 and as chair of Det Særlige Bygningssyn from 1991 to 1994.

In 2016, Vordroffsvej 10 was featured in the TV2 programme Huse der aldrig kommer til salg ("'Houses that are never traded").

== Architecture ==
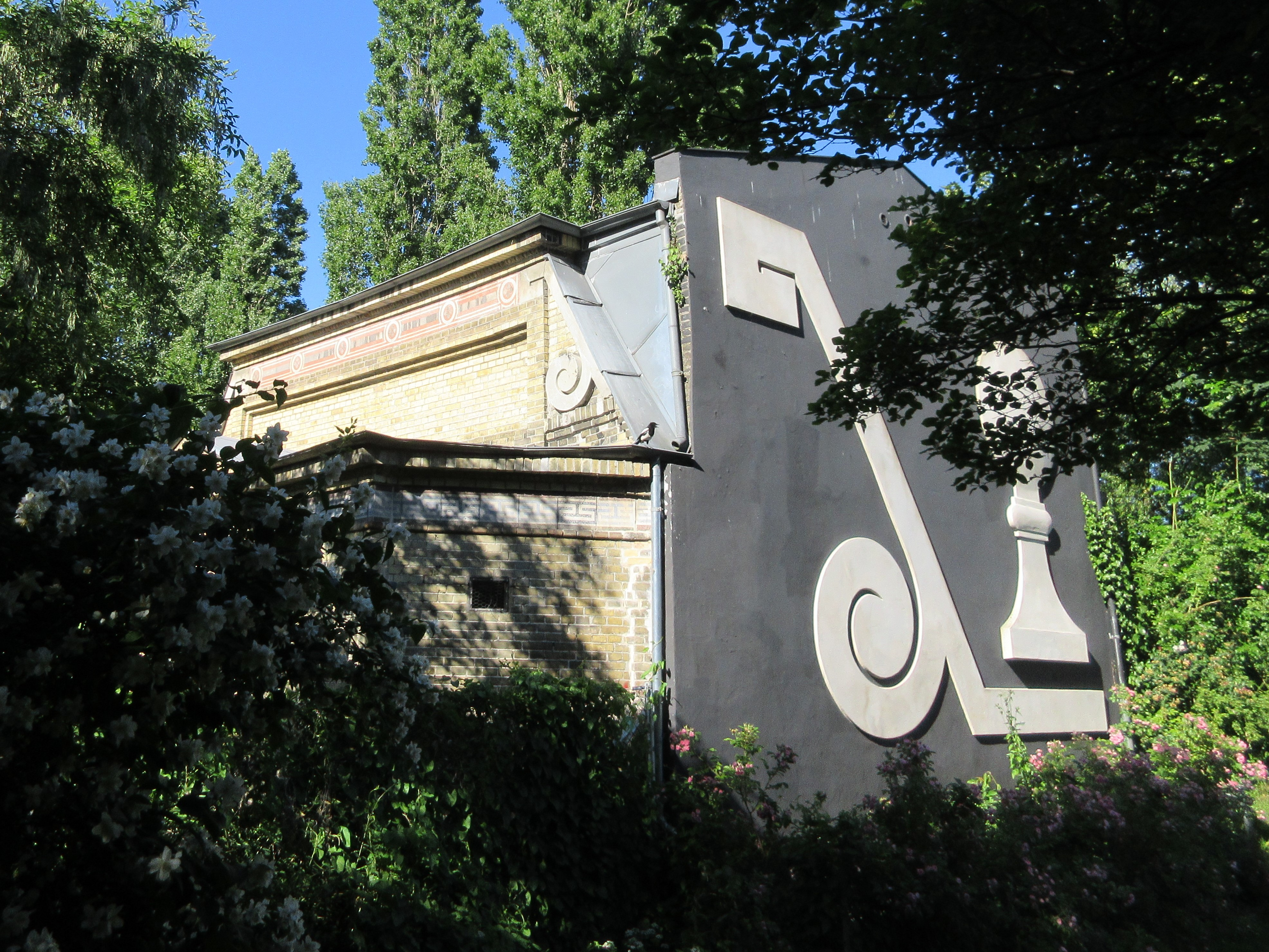
The atelier photographed from the adjacent public space in 2022

The house is constructed of red brick with two storeys over a walk-out basement. The square building is topped by a pyramidal roof with a small spire. The main entrance is accentuated by a plastered portal topped by a triangular pediment. The garden side of the building features large arched windows on each floor as well as an avant-corps topped by a balcony.

The atelier is constructed of yellow brick. The roof features a skylight on its north side. The four corners are marked by small pinacles topped by spheres. The main entrance is located in the western gable. It is topped by a triangular pediment. Its eastern gable is visible from a small public space next to the property. It was decorated with a mural in 1996.

== Garden ==
The garden continues all the way to Svineryggen, the path that runs along St. Jørgen's Lake. Much of the original garden plan has been preserved, although garden architect Ejgil Kjær introduced some changes in the 1940s. The garden contains more than 200 varieties of roses.

Other features include a "Tiny Town" play area constructed by Johnny Mürsch for his children in 1959. It was surrounded by birch trees with its own gate and comprises a play house in "Swiss style" with grass on the roof (like two outhouses), dovecote and a rabbit cage on stilts. Features that have been removed include a roofed sandbox, a small well with hoist and swing, seesaw and a covered bird table.

== Today ==
The house is today divided into three condominiums.

== See also ==
- Ording House
