= Vandkunsten (square) =

Square in Copenhagen, Denmark

Coordinates: 55.6761°N 12.5742°E

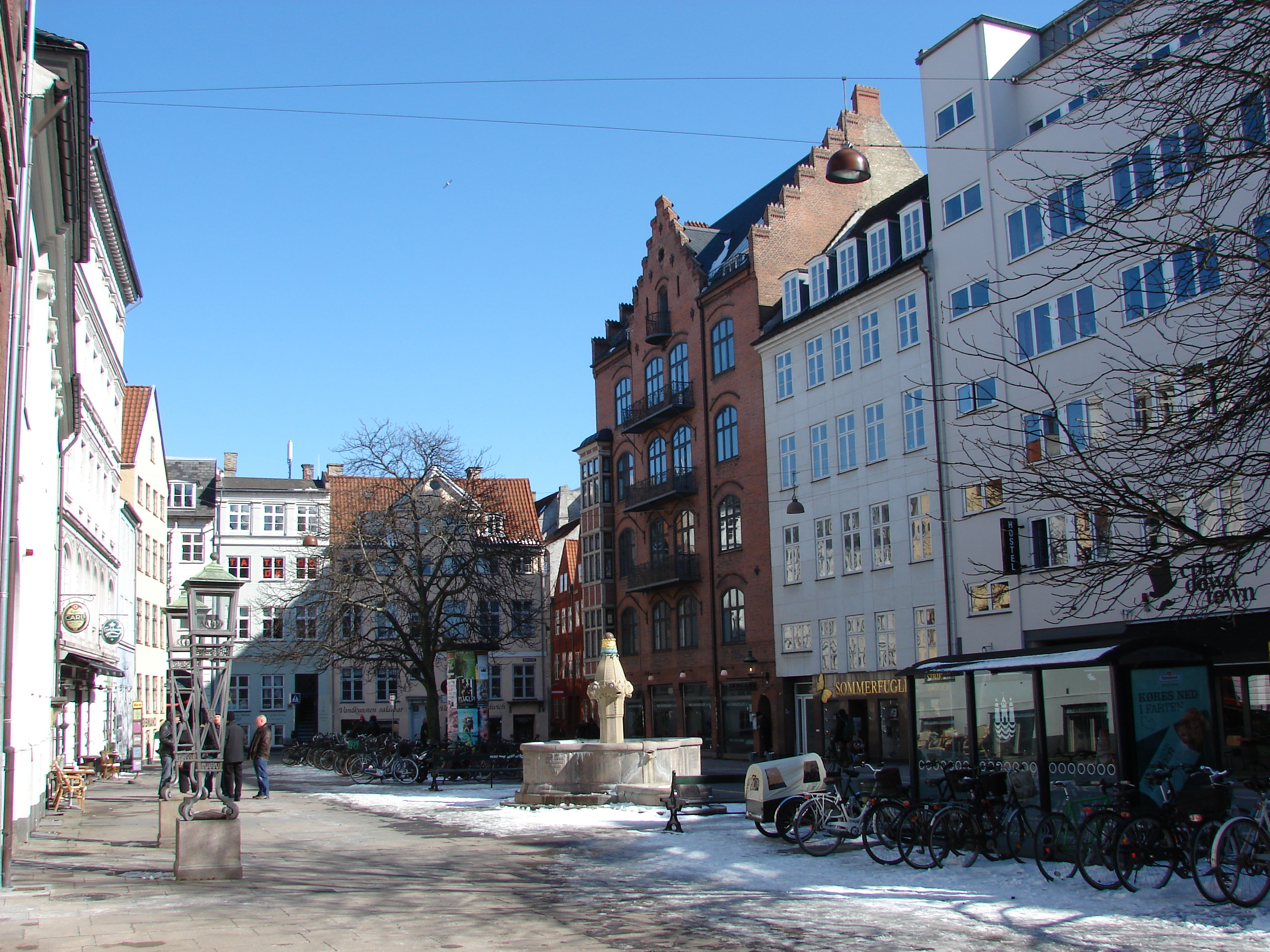
Vandkunsten viewed from Rådhusstræde

Vandkunsten (lit. 'The Water Feature') is a small square in the Old Town of Copenhagen, Denmark. It is located on the corner of Rådhusstræde with Løngangstræde. The name also refers to a fountain from 1910 that stands in the middle of the square.

== History ==
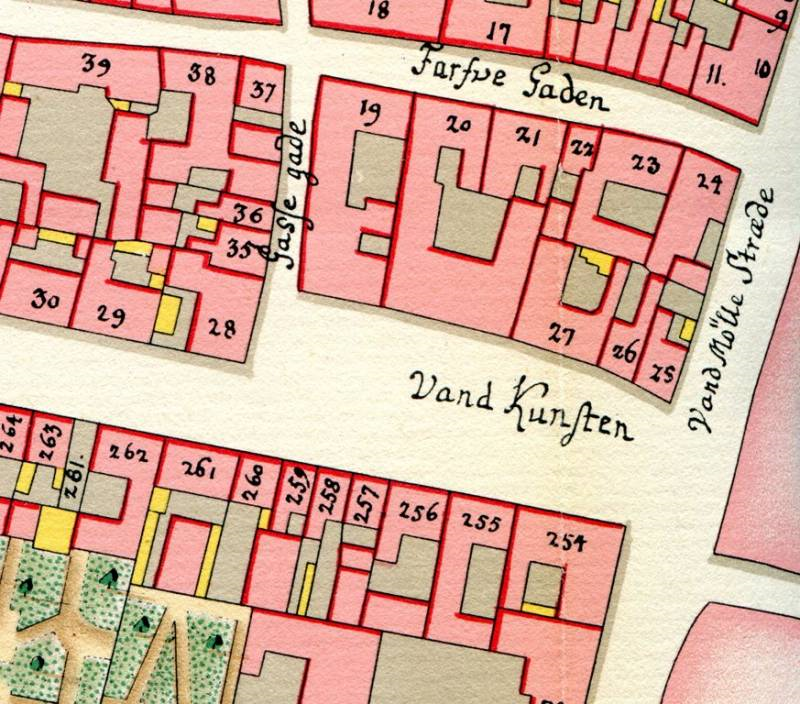
Vandkunsten on Gedde's map of Copenhagen from 1757

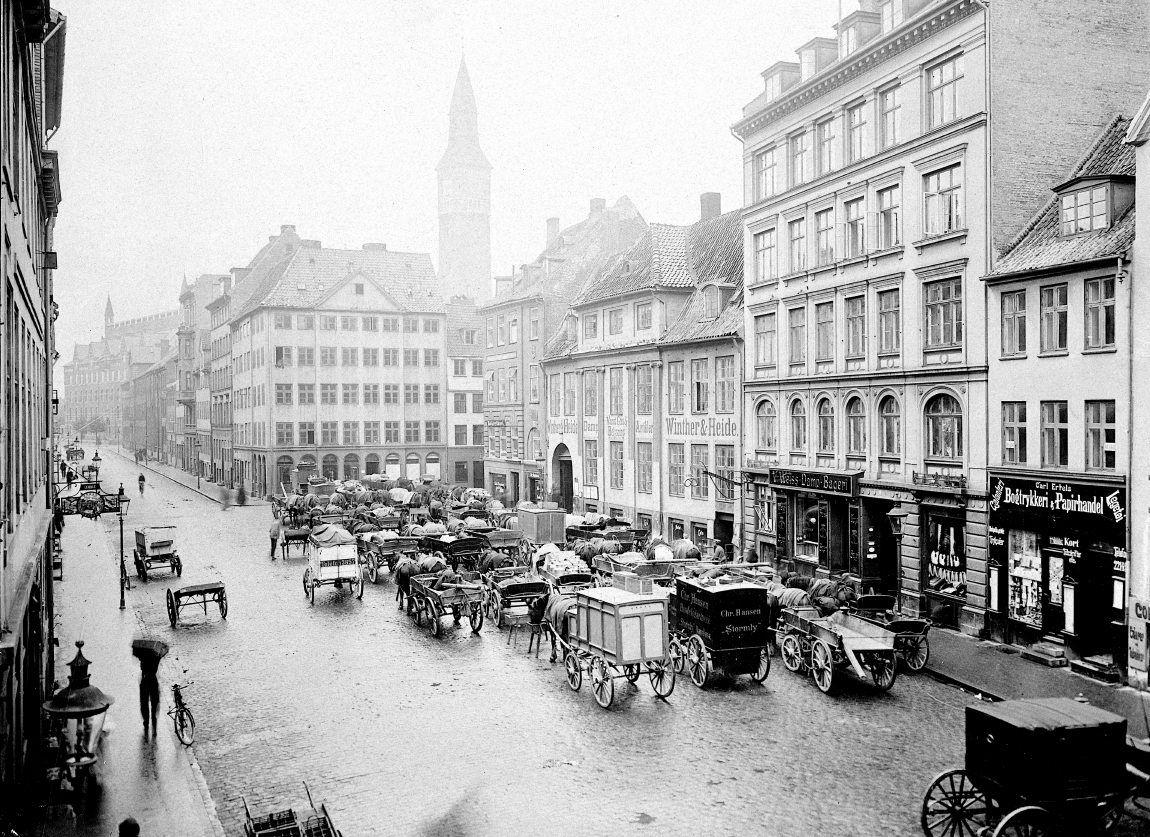
Vandkunsten in 1888

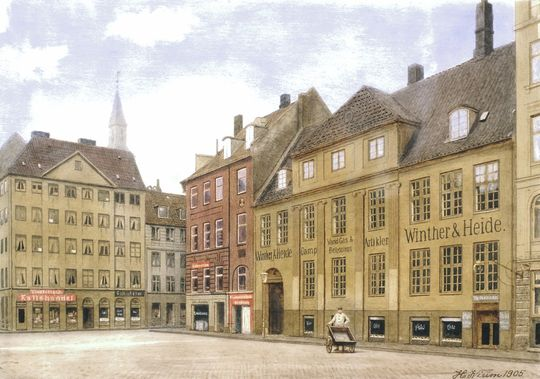
Vandkunsten in 1905, watercolour by Harald Wium

The square takes its name from a watermill that starting in the 14th century supplied Copenhagen Castle on nearby Slotsholmen with water through a system of wooden pipes. A mill pond was located at the site where the square is today. A pumping station was built at the site in 1539 but the water was polluted in connection with one of the many adaptions of Copenhagen Castle and it therefore had to be shut down.

For many years the site was left as a waste dump until it was finally cobbled over upon orders from Christian V; starting 1684 it was used as a fish market. The square escaped both the Copenhagen Fire of 1728 and the Fire of 1795. It has also played host to a flea market.

== Notable buildings and residents ==
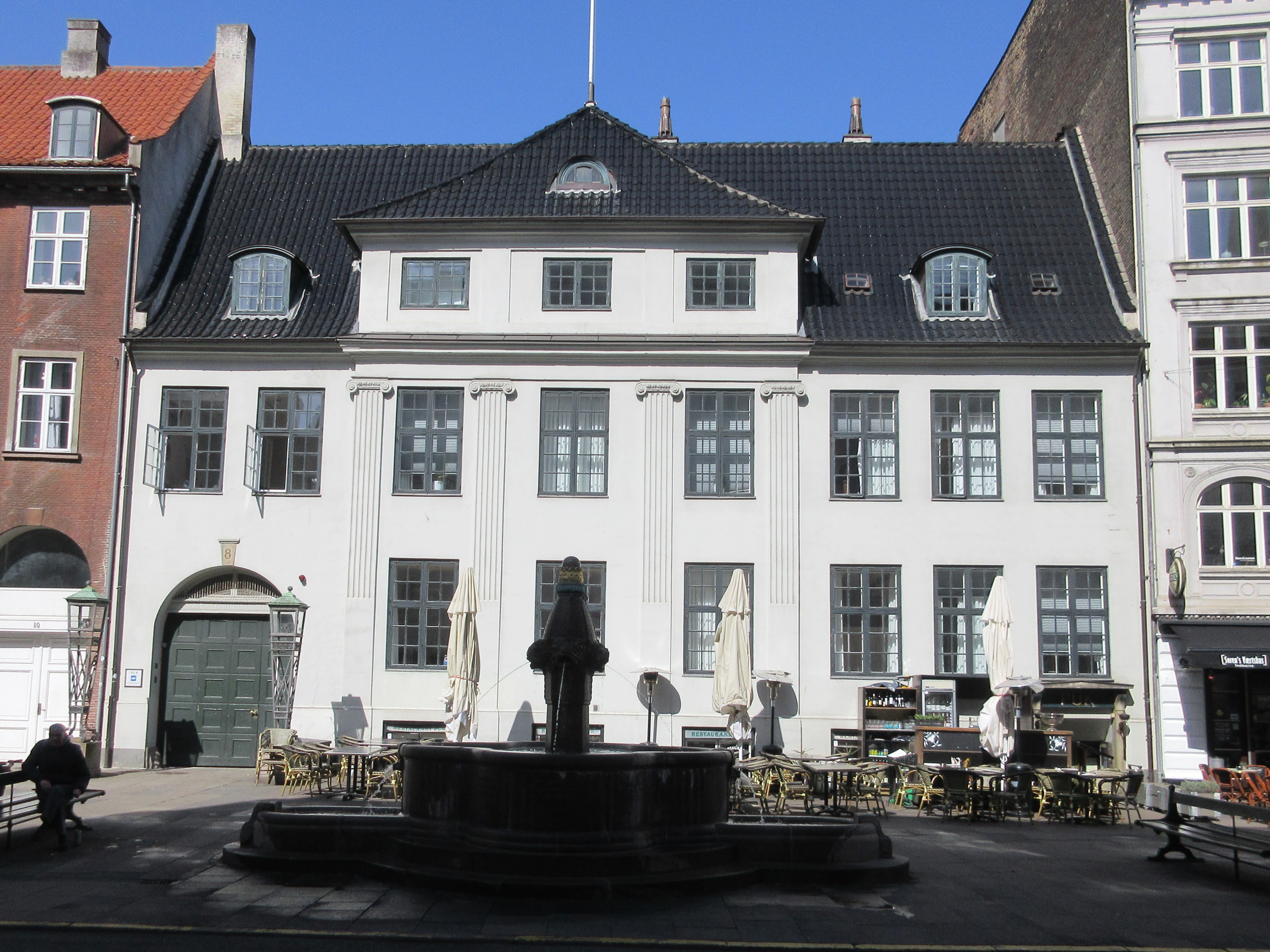
Vandkunsten 8

Four buildings on the square are listed in the Danish registry of protected buildings and places. Two of them. No. 8 and No. 10, were built as breweries. No. 8 is from 1750. In the 1810s, the brewer moved his activities to Kompagnistræde No. 39 on the other side of the block and the house on Vandkunsten was then converted into a residence for him and his family. The four Ionic order pilasters on the façade date from this time.

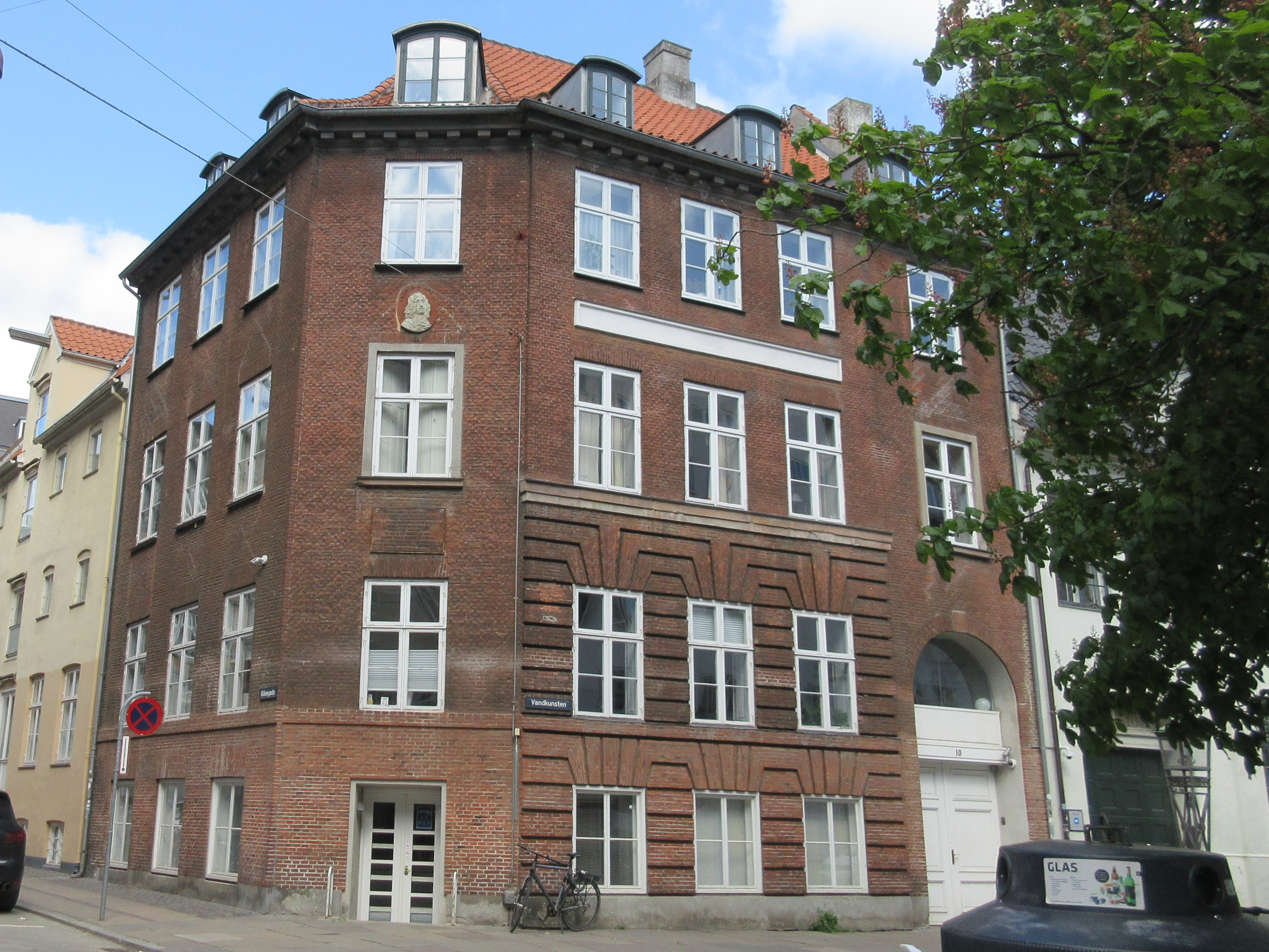
Vandkunsten 10

The Ording House ( No. 10), on the corner of Gåsegade, is from 1803 and was also built as a brewery. A memorial plaque on the corner commemorates the Swedish storm assault on Copenhagen which took place February 10 and 11, 1659 at this site0. The three-bay house at No. 11 (1735) and No. 13 (1754) are also listed.

The large property at the end of the square (No. 12, on the corner of Løngangsstræde, is called Kronborg due to its Historicist design which is remniscient of that of Kronborg Castle in Helsingør. The building is from 1895 and formerly served as headquarters of the Danish Teachers' Association. The building on the corner of Frederiksholms Kanal (Vandkunsten 1) is from 1910 and was designed by Aage Langeland-Mathiesen.

== Fountain ==
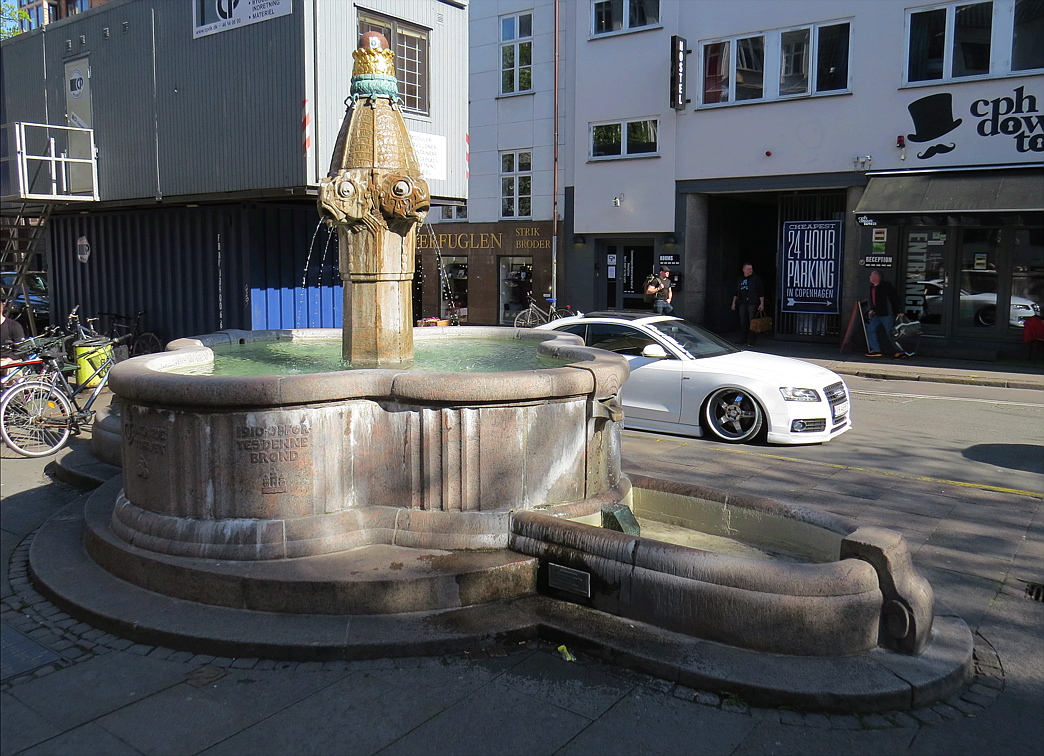
The fountain

The water feature was commissioned by Københavns Kunstfond (Copenhagen Art Foundation( from the architect Johannes Magdahl Nielsen in 1907 and inaugurated on 15 September 1910. The central stele is made of granite with decorative details in bronze and gilded metal. Its cylindrical, lower part is decorated with fish scales and the water jumps from four fish heads, details that commemorates the square's former use as a fish market. Its top is a hemisphere in polished red granite.

== Cultural references ==
Vandkunsten 6-8 is used as a location in the 1967 film Nyhavns glade gutter,

== See also ==
- Caritas Well
- Copenhagen Waterworks
