= Nørregade 6, Copenhagen =

Listed building in Copenhagen

Nørregade 6
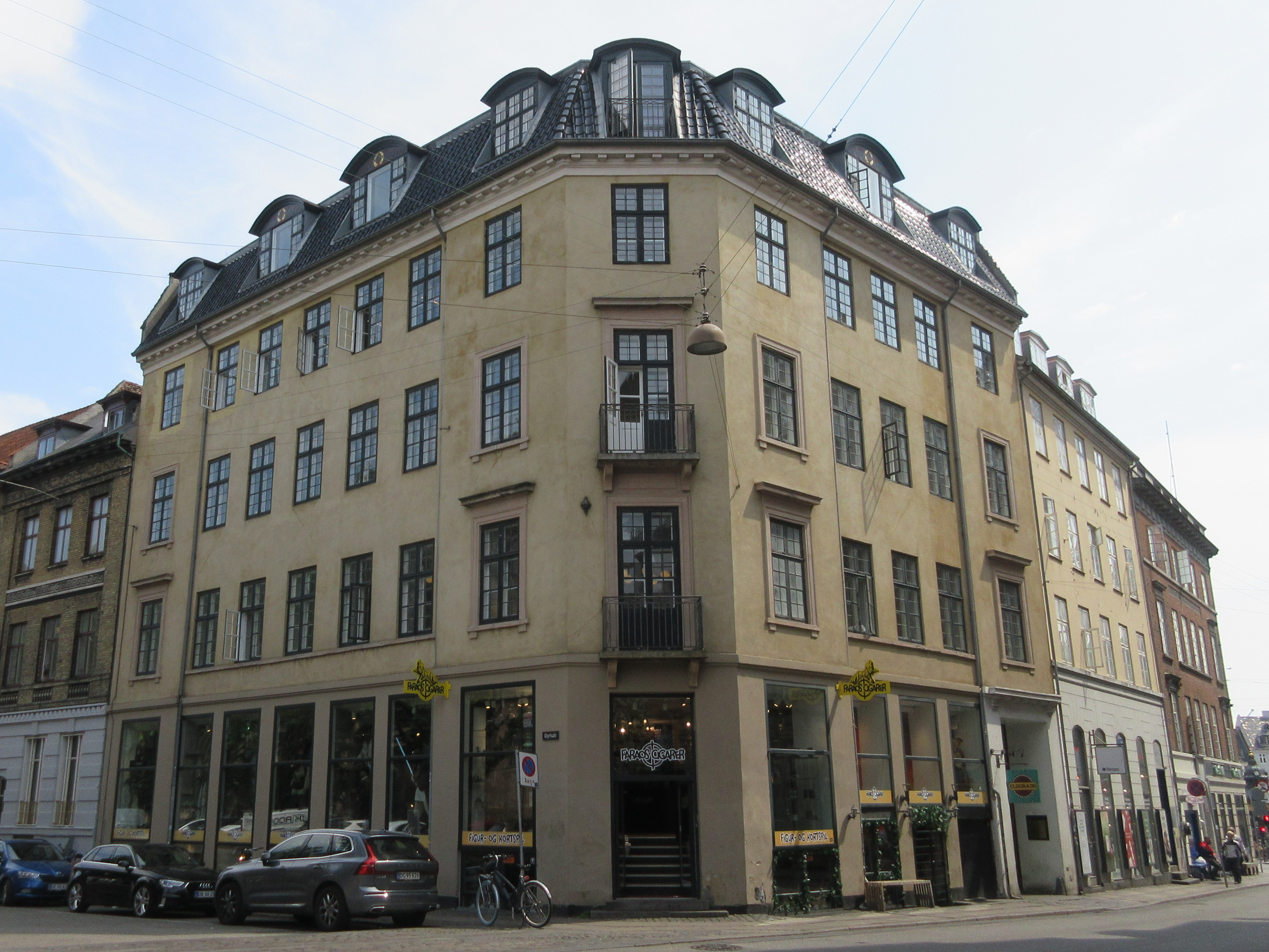
- Interactive map of the Nørregade 6 area

General information
- Location: Copenhagen, Denmark
- Coordinates: 55°40′43.9″N 12°34′20.06″E
- Completed: 1828

Nørregade 6 is a Neoclassical property situated at the corner of the streets Nørregade and Dyrkøb, next to the Church of Our Lady, in the Old Town of Copenhagen, Denmark. It was listed in the Danish registry of protected buildings and places in 1918. Former residents include the jurist and later politician Wilhelm Sponneck, army officer and politician Anton Frederik Tscherningm, publisher Meïr Aron Goldschmidt and Denmark's first female physician Nielsine Nielsen.

== Architecture ==
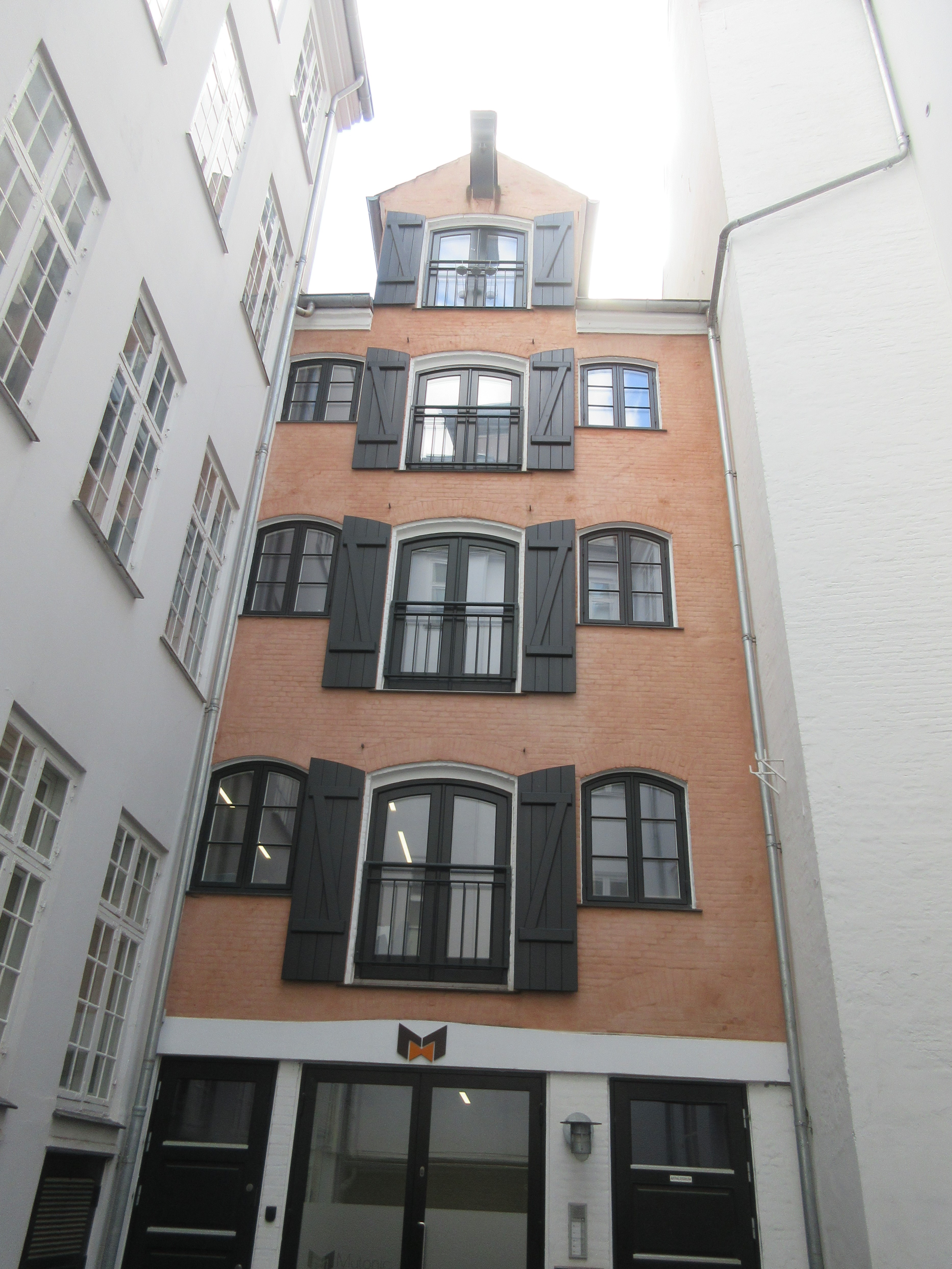
The warehouse in the courtyard.

Nørregade 6 is a corner building, with five bays towards Nørregade and seven bays towards Dyrkøb, constructed with four storeys above a walk-out basement. The chamfered corner bay was dictated for all corner buildings by Jørgen Henrich Rawert's and Peter Meyn's guidelines for the rebuilding of the city after the fire so that the fire department's long ladder companies could navigate the streets more easily. The corner bay features two balconies supported by corbels on the first and second floors. The first floor windows of the slightly recessed central bays towards both streets are visually brought together by a through-going sill course. The first floor windows on the projecting outer bays as well towards both streets as well as the second floor corner window are topped by hood moulds. The black Mansard roof dates from a renovation in 1897. It features three dormer windows towards Nørregade, four dormer windows towards Dyrkøb and one in the corner bay.

== See also ==
- Kronprinsessegade
