= The Maiden and the Nightingale =

Piece for piano

The Maiden and the Nightingale (Spanish: Quejas, o la Maja y el Ruiseñor) is a piano piece by the Spanish composer Enrique Granados. The piece, which lasts about six minutes, is part of his suite Goyescas which was inspired by the work of the painter Goya.

While the girls known as majas are a frequent subject of Goya, the piece has not been associated with a particular painting. The piece starts with the queja (in English, plaint or sad cry) of the maiden. Near the end there are glittering bird-like trills representing the nightingale.

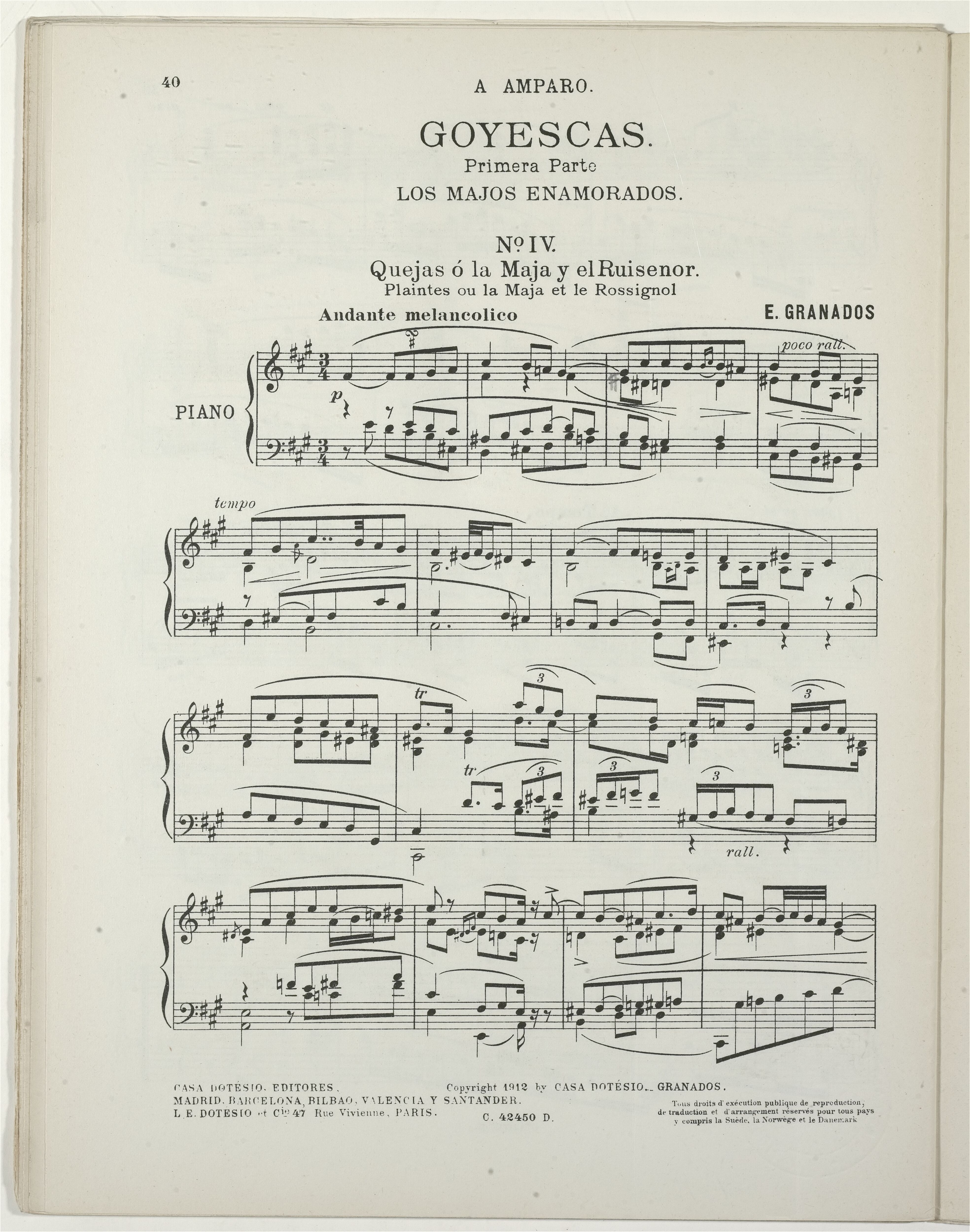
The piece bears a dedication to the wife of the composer

== Discography ==
The composer recorded the piece on piano roll. Other 20th-century pianists who played the work included:

- Arthur Rubinstein: an example of a pianist who programmed The maiden and the nightingale as a self-standing piece, Rubinstein's recordings available on CD include various versions, for example one from 1930.
- Alicia de Larrocha: noted for her performances of Goyescas, Larrocha was a winner at the 34th Annual Grammy Awards with one of her recordings of the suite. An earlier recording is also available.

== Arrangements and related works ==
=== Goyescas (opera) ===
In 1915 Granados adapted the music to form a soprano aria for the third scene of his opera Goyescas. His librettist Fernando Periquet y Zuaznabar provided a metrically suitable Spanish text which begins "¿Por qué entre sombras el ruiseñor?" While the piano version is a standard part of the repertoire for that instrument, the opera is not often performed, perhaps because of the deficiencies of the libretto.

=== Piano duo version ===
The piece was arranged for two pianos by Bartlett and Robertson who were active as a piano duo in the 1930s and 1940s. This version was published by J & W Chester of London. A digital recording of the arrangement was made in 2011 by a more recent piano duo Goldstone and Clemmow.

=== Bésame Mucho ===
The melody is said to be the inspiration of the much-recorded song Bésame Mucho by Consuelo Velázquez.

=== Jazz: Bill Evans Trio ===
The theme was recorded on September 29,1965, in the Van Gelder Studios, New Jersey, titled "Granadas", played by the trio of Jazz pianist Bill Evans (with Chuck Israels, b and Larry Bunker, dr), as part of a "hybrid" recording of classical pieces and Jazz tunes, arranged by Claus Ogerman for Jazz Trio and Symphony Orchestra; published 1966 on Verve Records (Bill Evans Trio With Symphony Orchestra, Nr. 821 983-2)
