= Goyescas =

Piano suite written by Enrique Granados

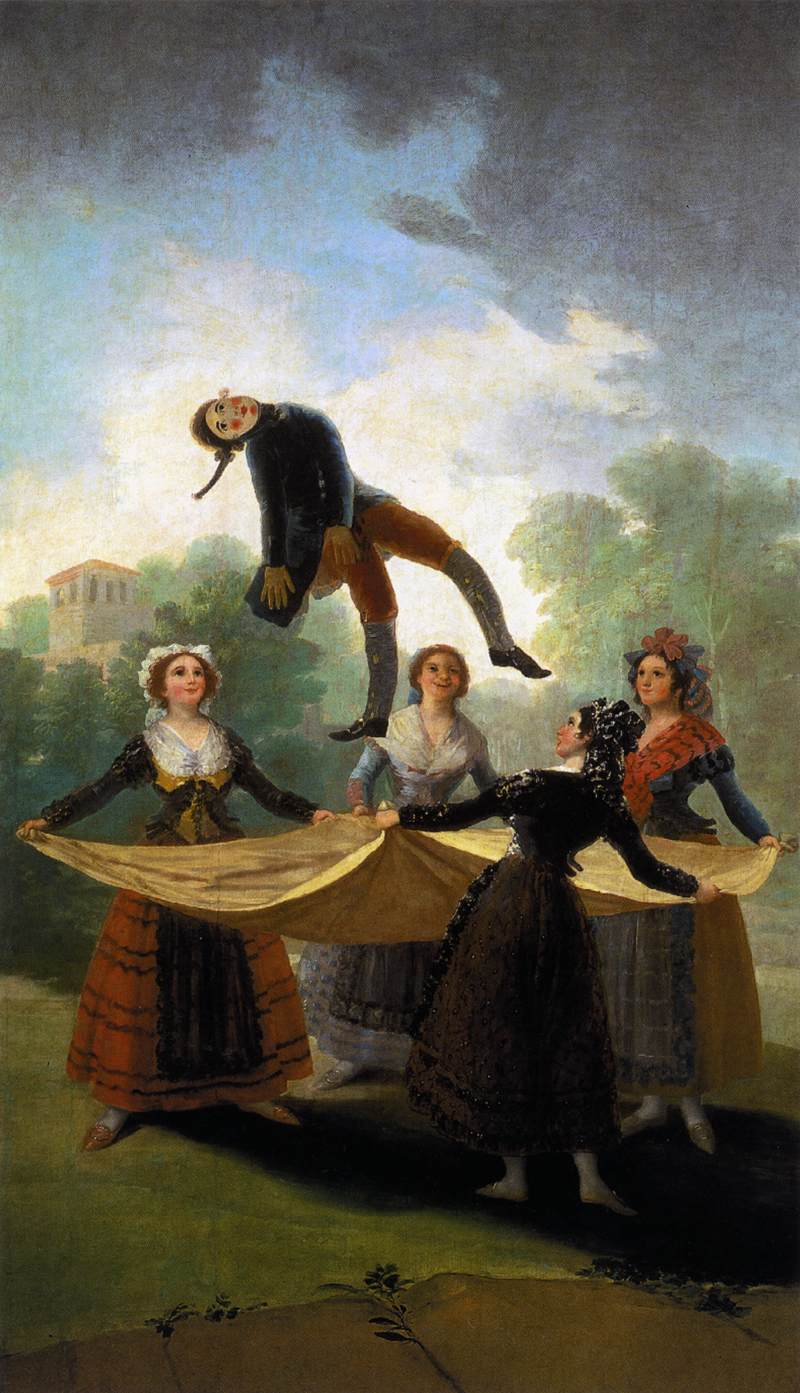
Goya's painting of "El Pelele" The mannequin or straw dummy.

Goyescas, Op. 11, subtitled Los majos enamorados (The Gallants in Love), is a piano suite written in 1911 by Spanish composer Enrique Granados. It was inspired by the work of the Spanish artist Francisco Goya. The piano pieces have not been authoritatively associated with any particular paintings with two exceptions:

- El amor y la muerte (Love and death) shares its title with one of Goya's prints from the series called Los caprichos
- El pelele (The straw man) is one of Goya's paintings.

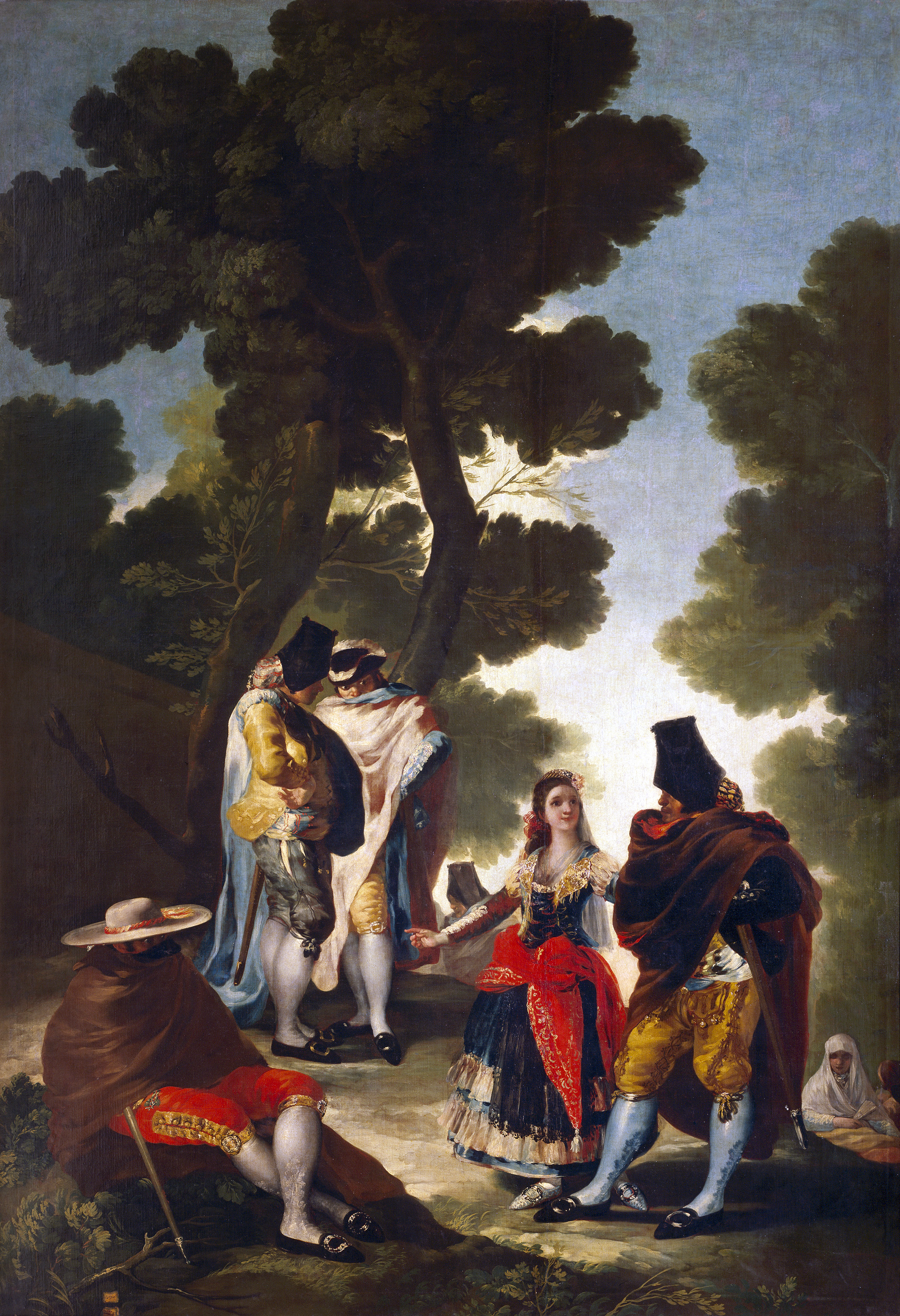
Goya's painting of 1777 known as El Paseo de Andalucía or La Maja y los embozados.

This piano suite is usually considered Granados's crowning creation. It forms part of the standard Romantic piano repertoire and is sometimes recorded by pianists who are not particularly associated with Spanish music as well as being a major staple of the repertoire of those who have specialized in Spanish repertoire. It is often considered to be one of the two crown-jewels in Spanish piano repertoire along with the Iberia Suite of Isaac Albeniz.

== Writing of the Goyescas ==
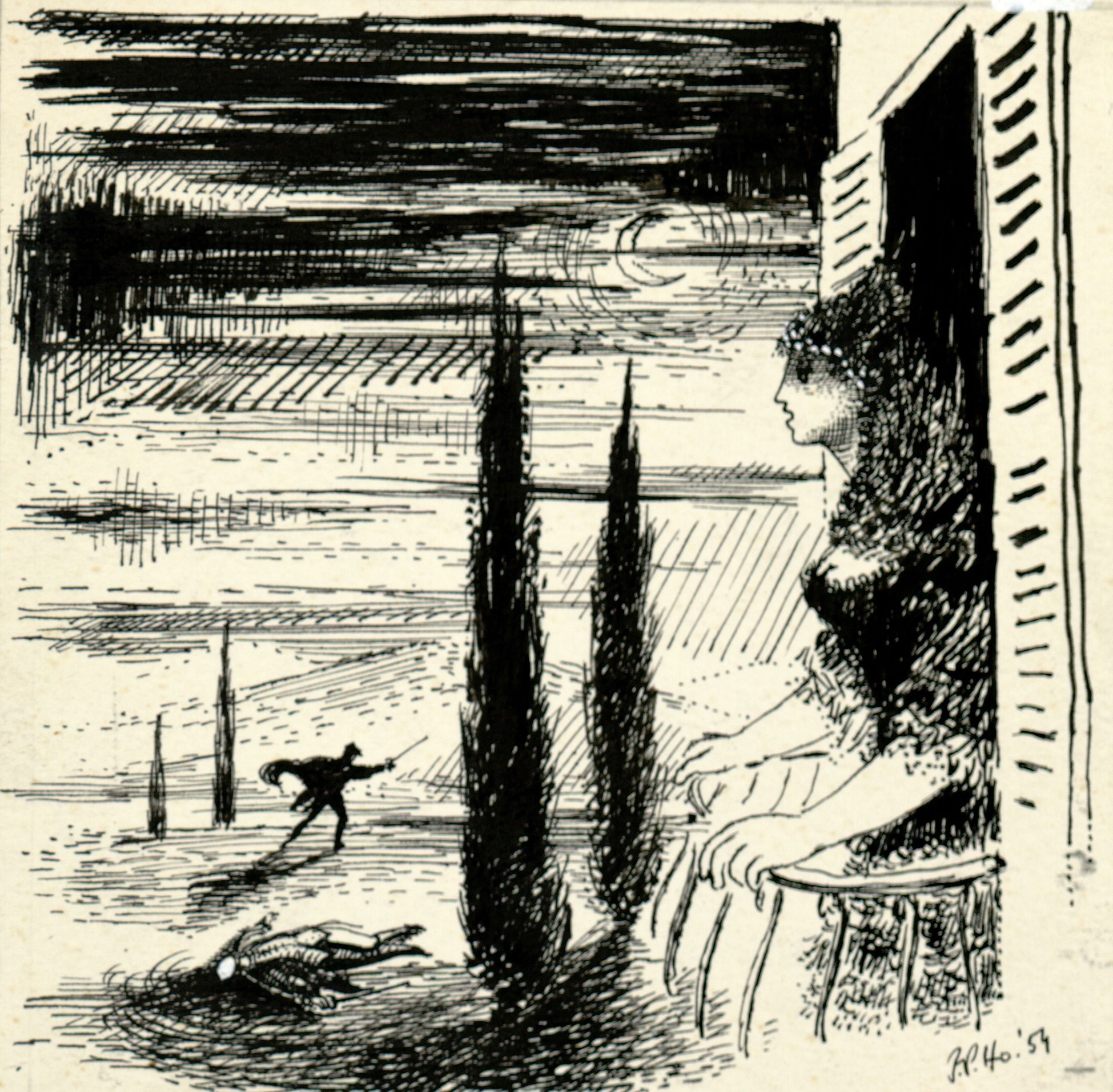
Drawing for booklet cover, drawing for Goyescas (1954).

The piano writing of Goyescas is highly ornamented and extremely difficult to master, requiring both subtle dexterity and great power. Some of them have a strong improvisational feel, the clearest example of this being the fifth piece, called El amor y la muerte (Love and Death). The fourth piece in the series (Quejas, ó la maja y el ruiseñor—The Maiden and the Nightingale) is the best known piece from the suite. It resembles a nocturne, but is filled with intricate figuration, inner voices and, near the end, glittering bird-like trills and quicksilver arpeggios. Mexican songwriter Consuelo Velázquez based her 1940 song Bésame Mucho on this melody.

This piano suite was written in two books. Work on Goyescas began in 1909, and by 31 August 1910, the composer was able to write that he had composed "great flights of imagination and difficulty." Granados himself gave the première of Book I at the Palau de la Música Catalana in Barcelona on 11 March 1911. He completed Book II in December 1911 and gave its first performance at the Salle Pleyel in Paris on 2 April 1914.

El pelele (The Straw Man), subtitled Escena goyesca, is usually programmed as part of the Goyescas suite; Granados gave the première in the Teatre Principal at Terrassa, on 29 March 1914.

== The suite ==
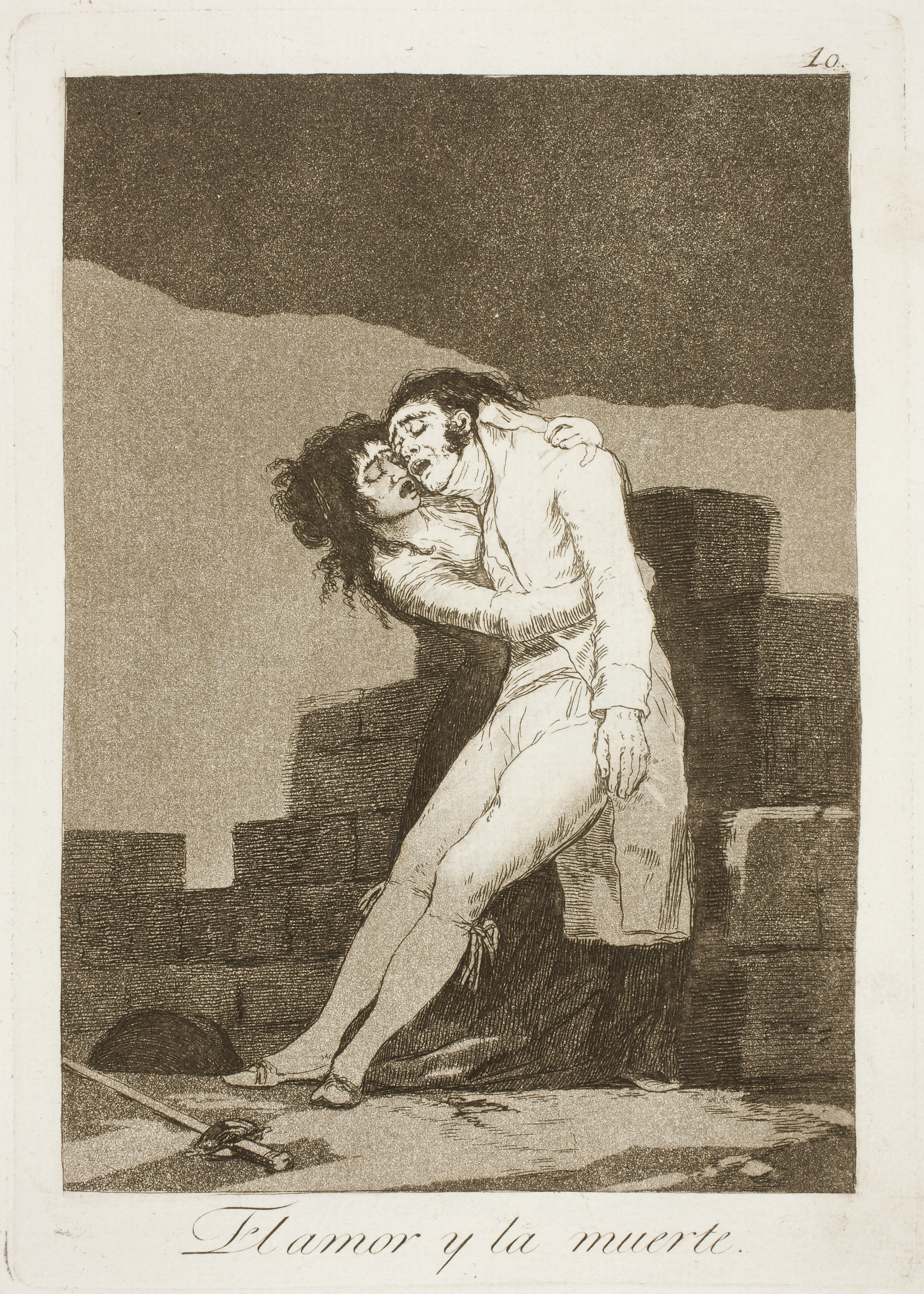
"El amor y la muerte" a print by Goya from 1799

Book I:

- Los requiebros (The Compliments)
- Coloquio en la reja (Conversation at the reja)
- El fandango de candil (Fandango by Candlelight)
- Quejas, o La Maja y el ruiseñor (Complaint, or the Girl and the Nightingale)

Book II

- El Amor y la muerte (Balada) (Ballad of Love and Death)
- Epilogo: Serenata del espectro (Epilogue: Serenade of the Spectre)
- El Pelele: Escena Goyesca (The Puppet/Straw Dummy: Goya Scene)

El Pelele is technically not part of the suite, but very often played with it.

== Publication ==
Book One, consisting of the first four pieces in the suite was published in Barcelona in 1912. Book Two, which consists of the last two pieces was published in 1914.

== Recordings ==
=== 20th century ===
- Granados: the composer's playing of the work was captured on piano roll.

Goyescas, Part 1, Los Requiebros as recorded by Granados on piano roll, c. 1913, Paris

- Alicia de Larrocha

Alicia de Larrocha was noted for her performances of Goyescas of which she made several recordings; a version on the RCA label was a winner at the 34th Annual Grammy Awards (Best classical instrumental solo recording 1991).

- Douglas Riva
- Thomas Rajna
- Eduardo del Pueyo

=== 21st century ===
- Garrick Ohlsson
- Kun-Woo Paik
- Luis Fernando Pérez

== Opera ==
Intermezzo from Goyescas (5:27)
Performed in 1995 by the United States Marine Band

In 1915 Granados wrote a one-act opera, also called Goyescas, to a Spanish libretto by Fernando Periquet y Zuaznaba, using melodies from the piano suite. This was first performed in 1916.

A film called Goyescas was based on the opera.

The Intermezzo is primarily from the Opera and known best in its orchestral version, however there is also a rarely performed piano version of this Intermezzo as well which the American pianist Neil Galanter recorded in his release of the Goyescas Suite.
