= Medina-Sidonia =

Medina Sidonia
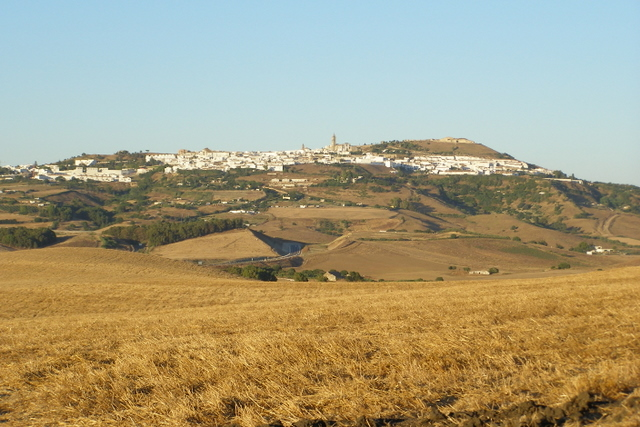

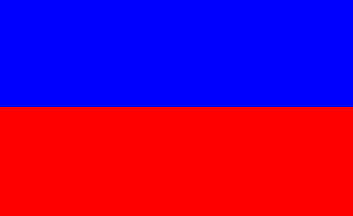
- Flag Coat of arms

- Location of Medina-Sidonia in Spain
- Coordinates: 36°28′N 5°55′W
- Country: Spain
- Autonomous community: Andalusia
- Province: Cádiz

Government
  - Mayor: Manuel Fernando Macías Herrera (Izquierda Unida)

Area
  - Total: 493 km^{2} (190 sq mi)
- Elevation: 337 m (1,106 ft)

Population (2025-01-01)
  - Total: 11,838
  - Density: 24.0/km^{2} (62.2/sq mi)
- Time zone: UTC+1 (CET)
  - Summer (DST): UTC+2 (CEST)
- Website: http://www.medinasidonia.com/

Medina Sidonia is a city and municipality in the province of Cádiz in the autonomous community of Andalusia, southern Spain. Considered by some to be the oldest city in Europe, it is used as a military defence location because of its elevation.

Medina-Sidonia, one of Spain's most important ducal seats in the 15th century, produced an admiral, Alonso Pérez de Guzmán, 7th Duke of Medina Sidonia, who led the Spanish Armada against England in 1588. The title of Duque de Medina Sidonia was bestowed upon the family of Guzmán El Bueno for his valiant role in taking the town. The line continues and was led until March 2008 by the controversial socialist Luisa Isabel Álvarez de Toledo, 21st Duchess of Medina Sidonia (born 1936).

== Etymology ==
The city's name comes from Medina (Arabic for 'city') and Sidonia (of Sidon) and means 'City of Sidon'. Locals are known as Asidonenses.

== History ==
This city was most likely ancient Asido, an Iberian settlement which may have been founded by the Phoenicians, hence the later name Sidonia reflecting its foundation by Sidon. Its earliest phase is known through its coinage and its 2nd and 1st centuries BC issues bear the Latin inscription Asido but also Punic inscriptions such as 'sdn or b'b'l, with Herakles and dolphins being notable obverse and reverse designs. The Barrington Atlas of the Greek and Roman World equates this site with modern Medina Sidonia - lying within the ancient Roman province of Turdetania some 30 km (19 mi) inland from the southern Spanish coast, this site lay upon a hill about 35 km (22 mi) to the east of Gades (modern Cádiz), and 15 km (9 mi) to the west of the Besilus river.

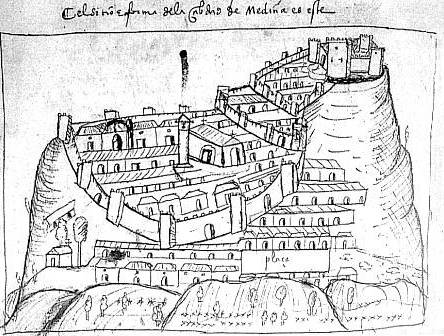
16th century map of Medina-Sidonia, by Pedro Barrantes Maldonado

By the 3rd century BC the Romans had gained control over much of southern Spain; once coming under Roman hegemony this site was later referred to as Asido Caesarina. In 571, Visigothic king Liuvigild attacked the Byzantines and captured Medina Sidonia. In 712, the town was conquered by the Muslim commander Musa ibn Nusayr, and became the capital of the province of Sidonia in the emirate of Spain, The Palestinian jund (Arabic: جند فلسطين, Jund Filasṭīn; also referred to as Ahl Filasṭīn, meaning “people of Palestine”) was a military division of the early Islamic Caliphate. Following the Muslim conquest of the Iberian Peninsula in the early 8th century, contingents of the Palestinian jund settled in parts of al-Andalus, including Jerez and Sidonia. The city was attacked by Vikings in 842. It returned to Christian hands with Alfonso X of Castile, in 1264, becoming a stronghold along the frontier with the last Muslim country in the Iberian Peninsula, the Kingdom of Granada. It was also the seat of several military orders.

In 1440, it became part of the lordship of the Dukes of Medina-Sidonia.

== Demographics ==
demographic vertical bar chart of Medina-Sidonia between 1842 and 2021
De jure census population, according to the INE.
De facto census population, according to the INE.

== Sights ==
The town is characterized by medieval walls and tidy, narrow cobbled streets flanked by rows of reja-fronted houses. Sights include:

- Medina-Sidonia Castle (13th–15th centuries)
- Roman archaeological complex (1st century AD)
- Town Hall (16th century)
- La Alameda (16th century)
- Ducal Stables (16th century)
- Church of Saint Mary the Crowned (Spanish: Iglesia de Santa María la Coronada)
- Castle of Torre-estrella (13th century)

== Gallery ==
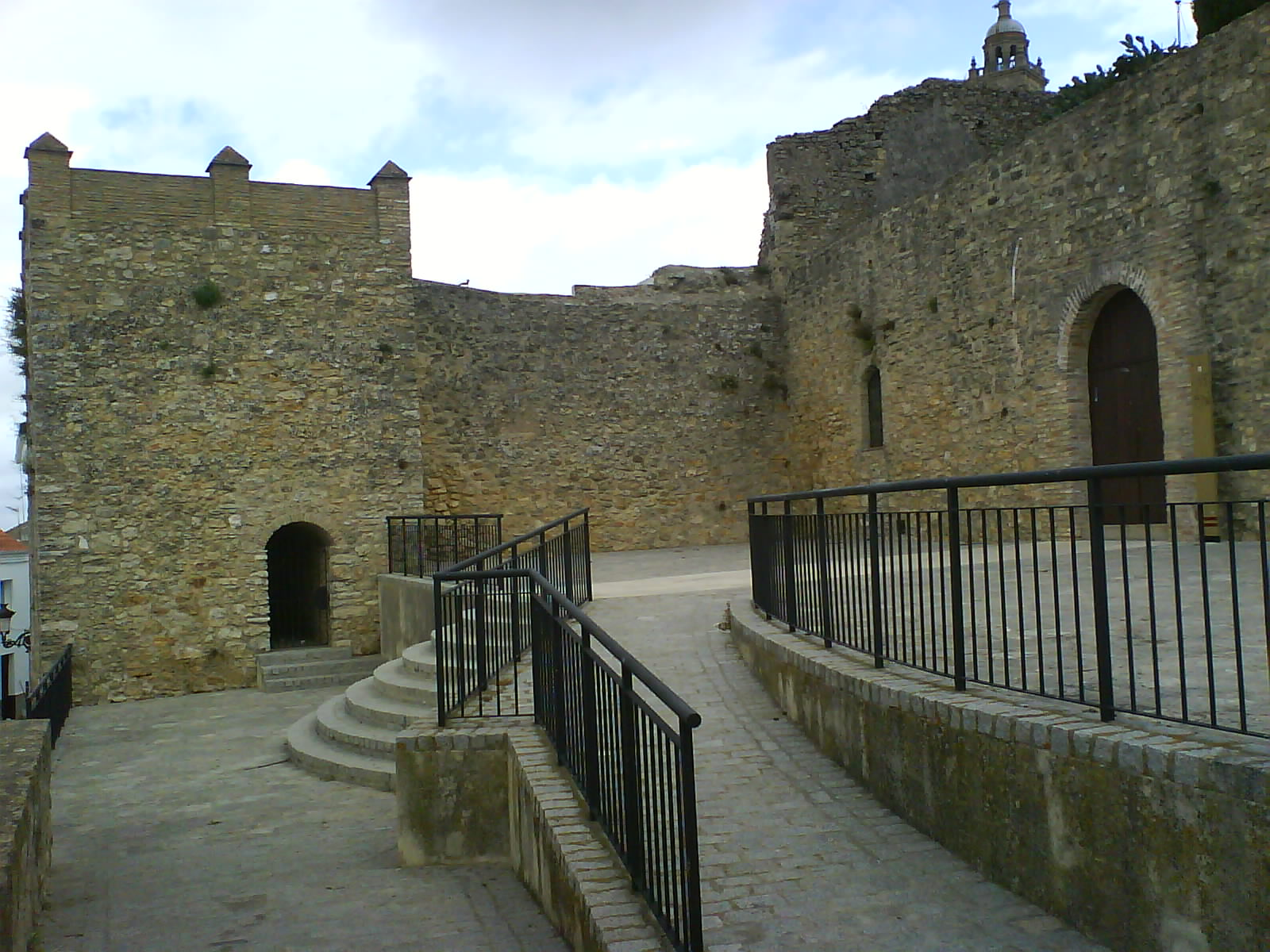
The Ducal Stables

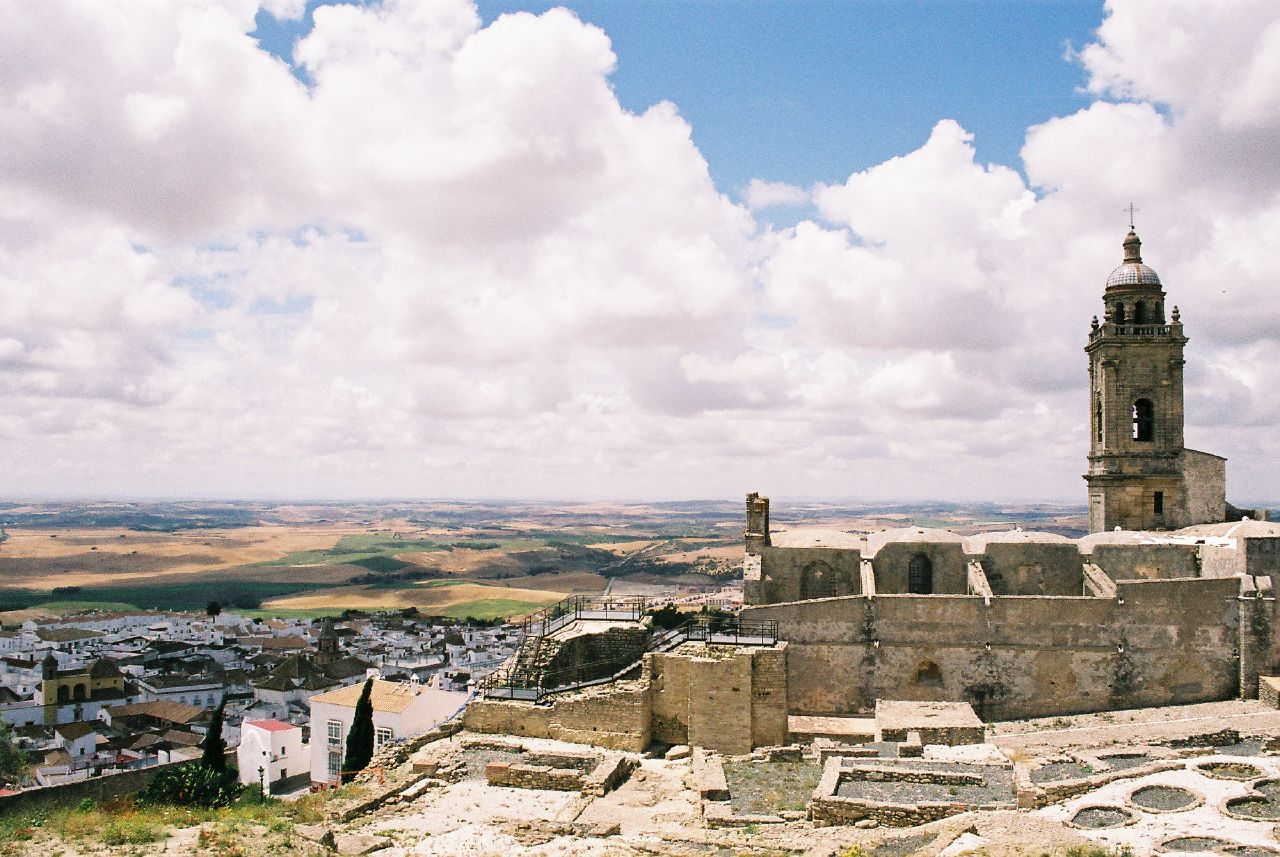

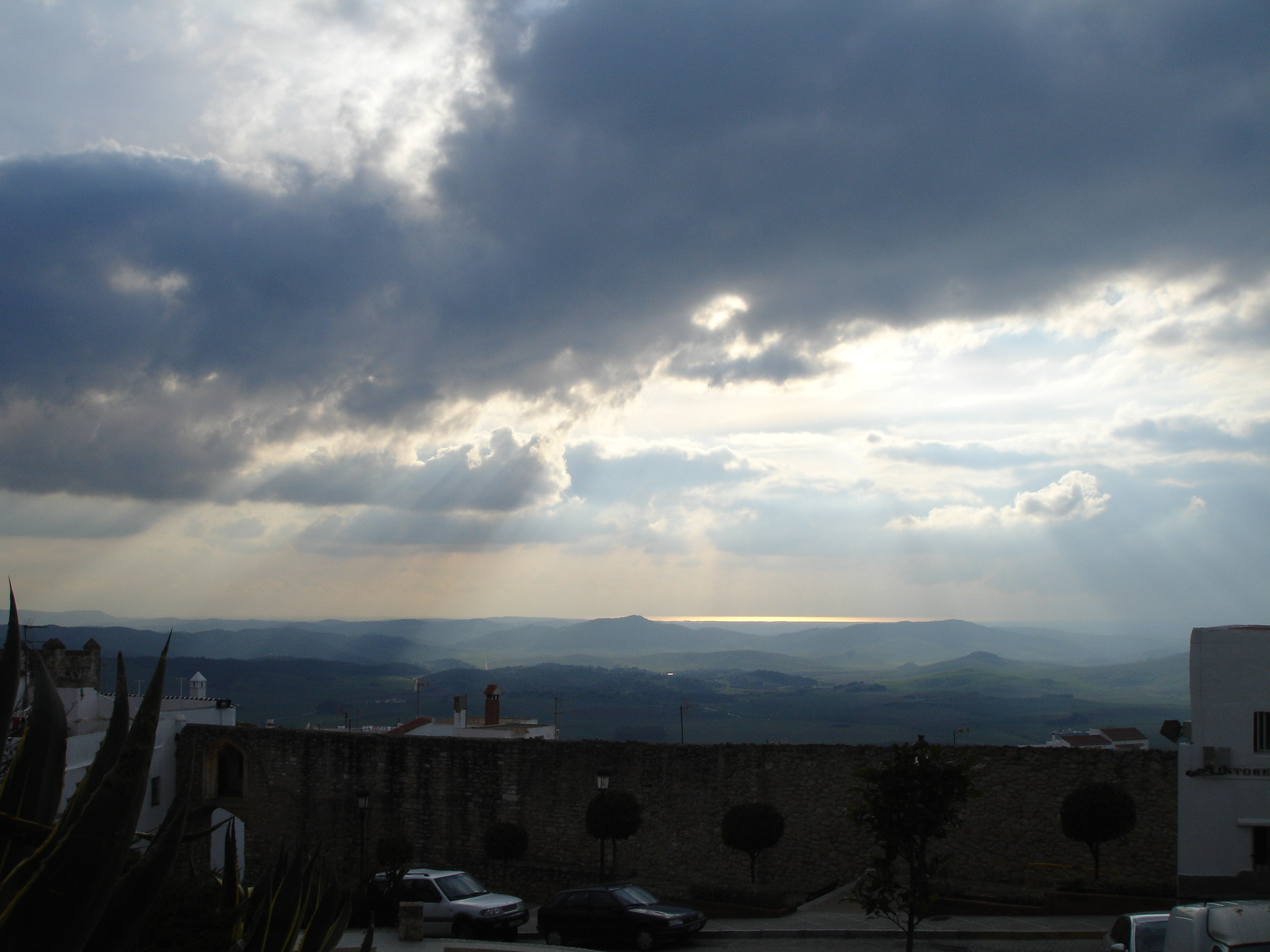

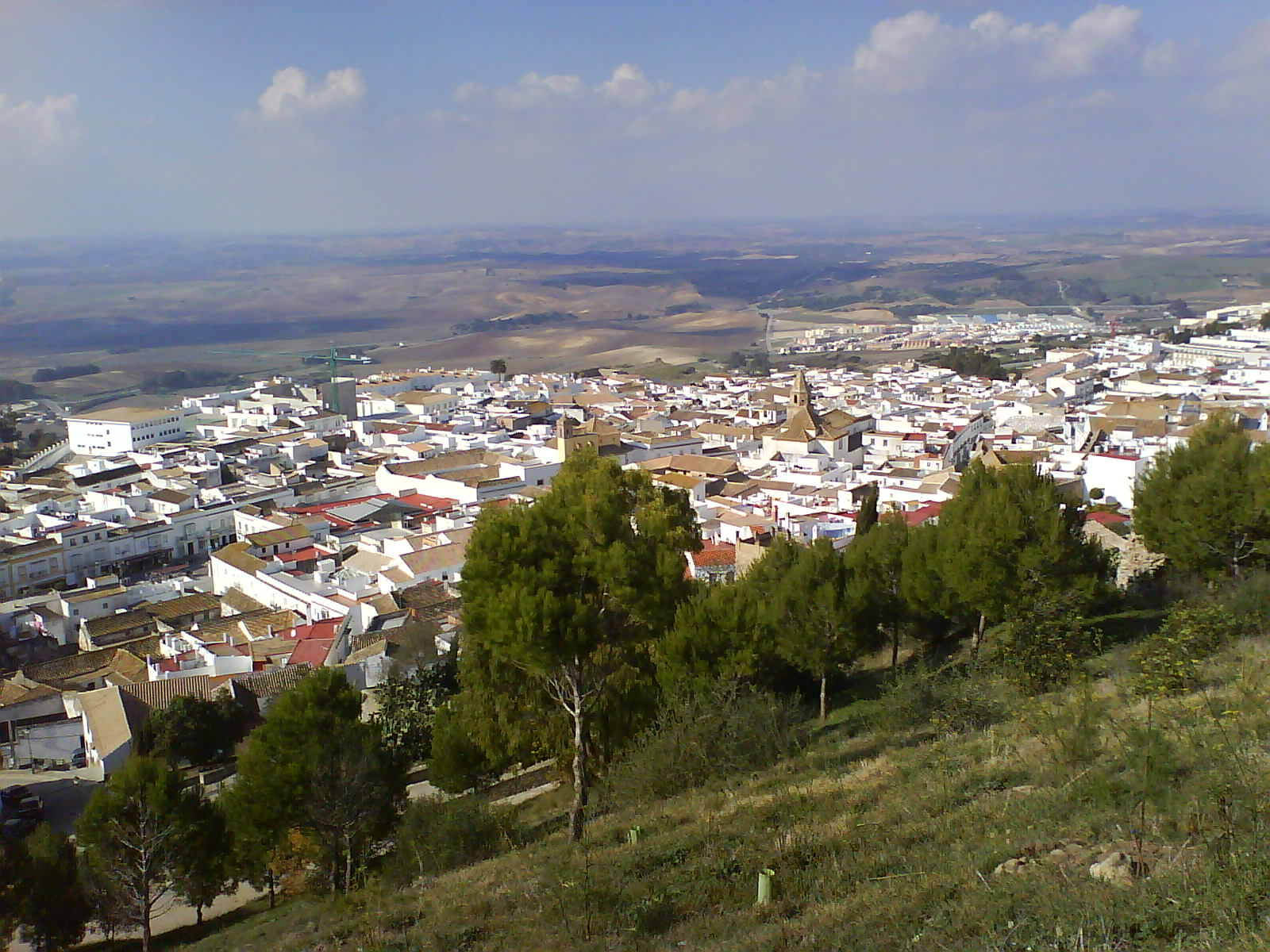

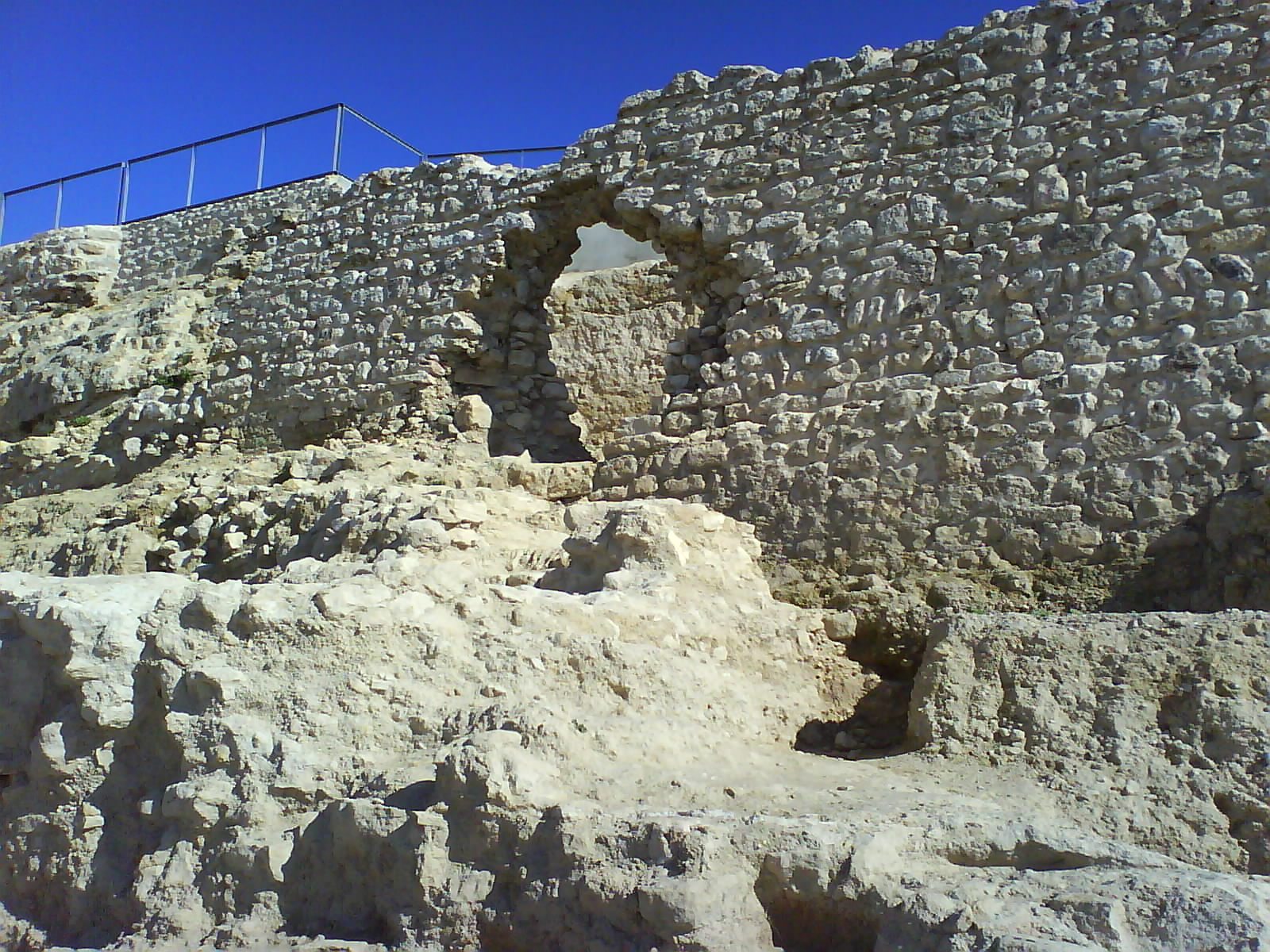
Medina-Sidonia Castle

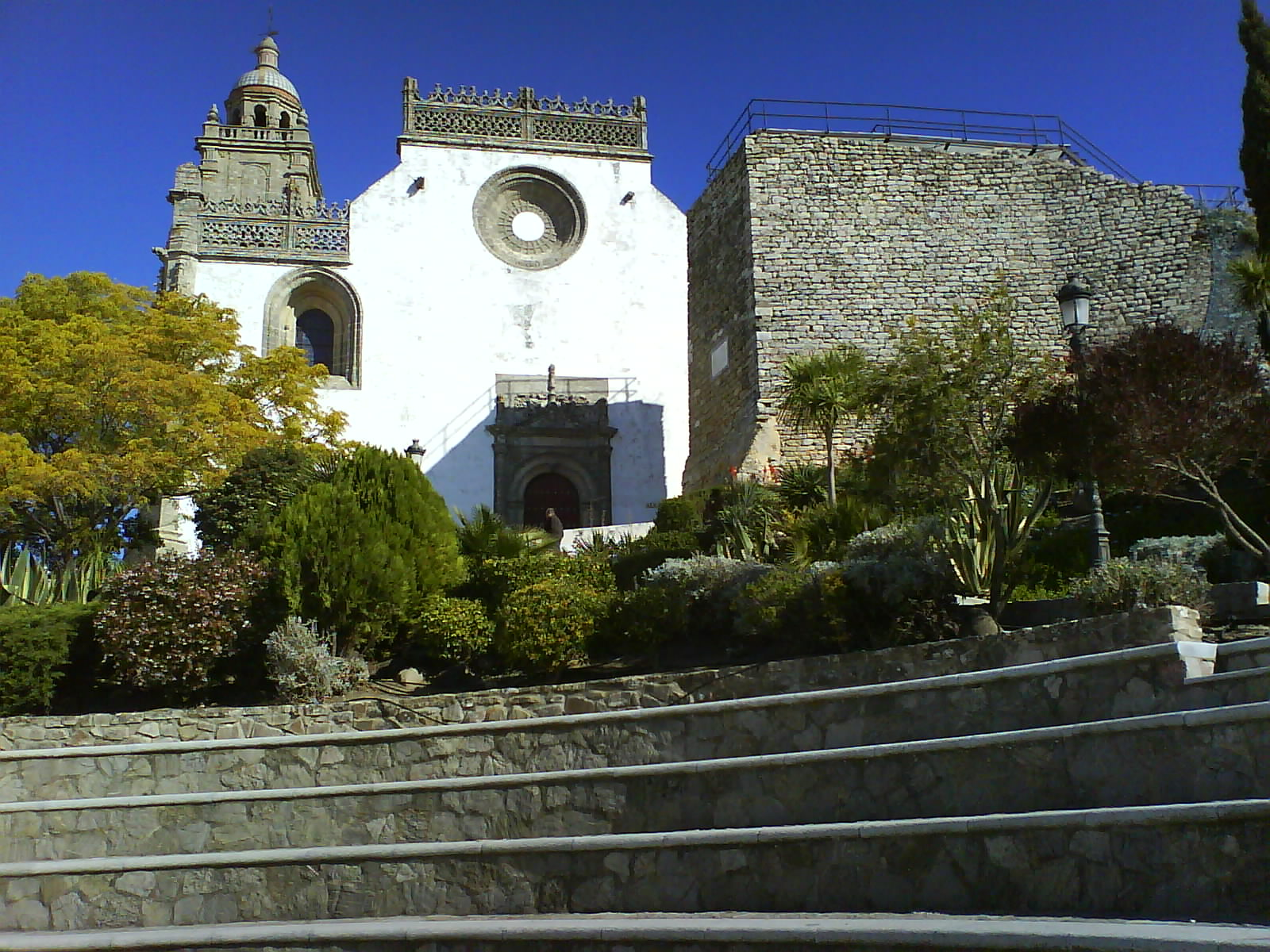
Santa María la Coronada church

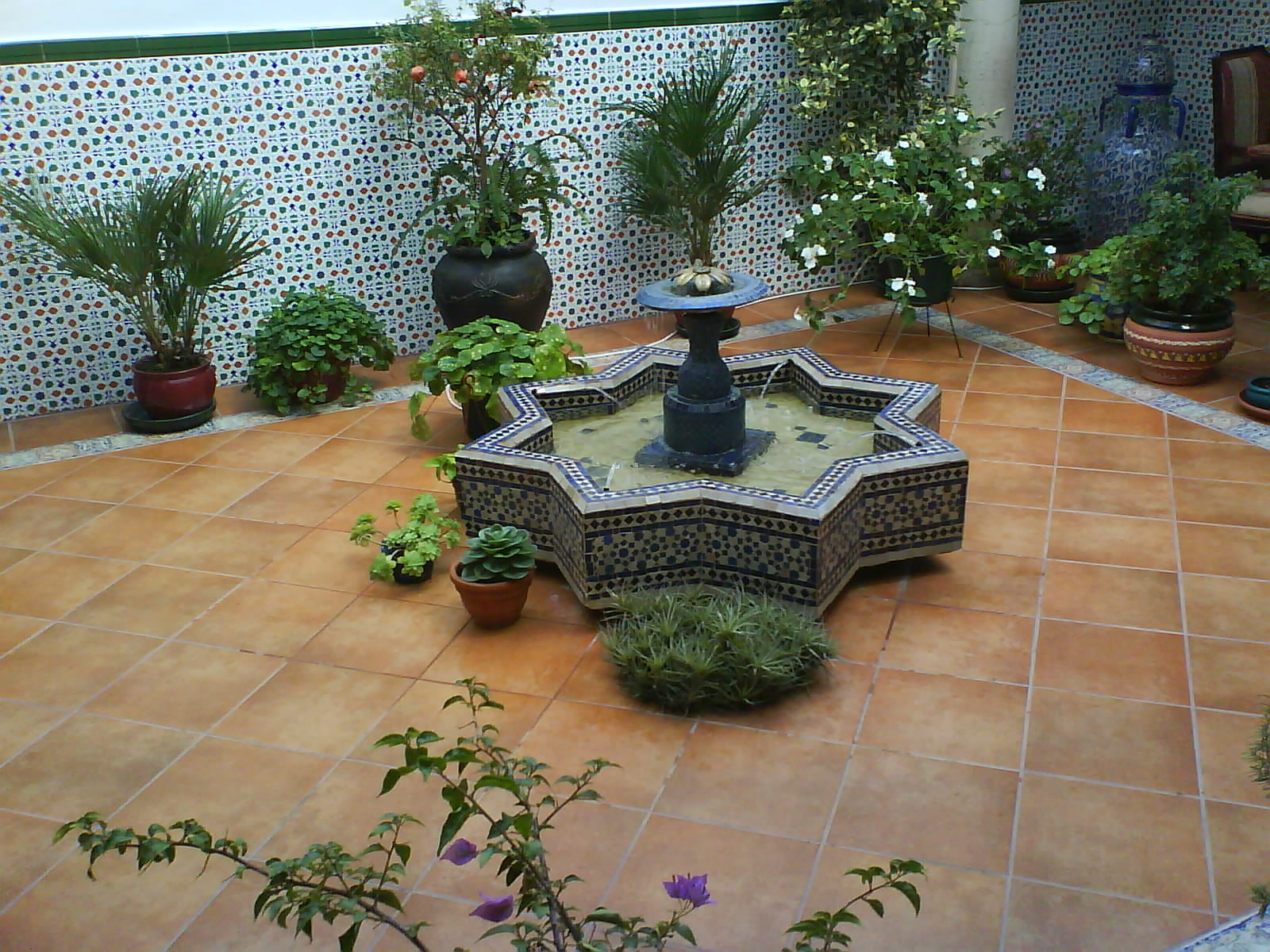
Asidonian Patio, Casa Rural Sidonia

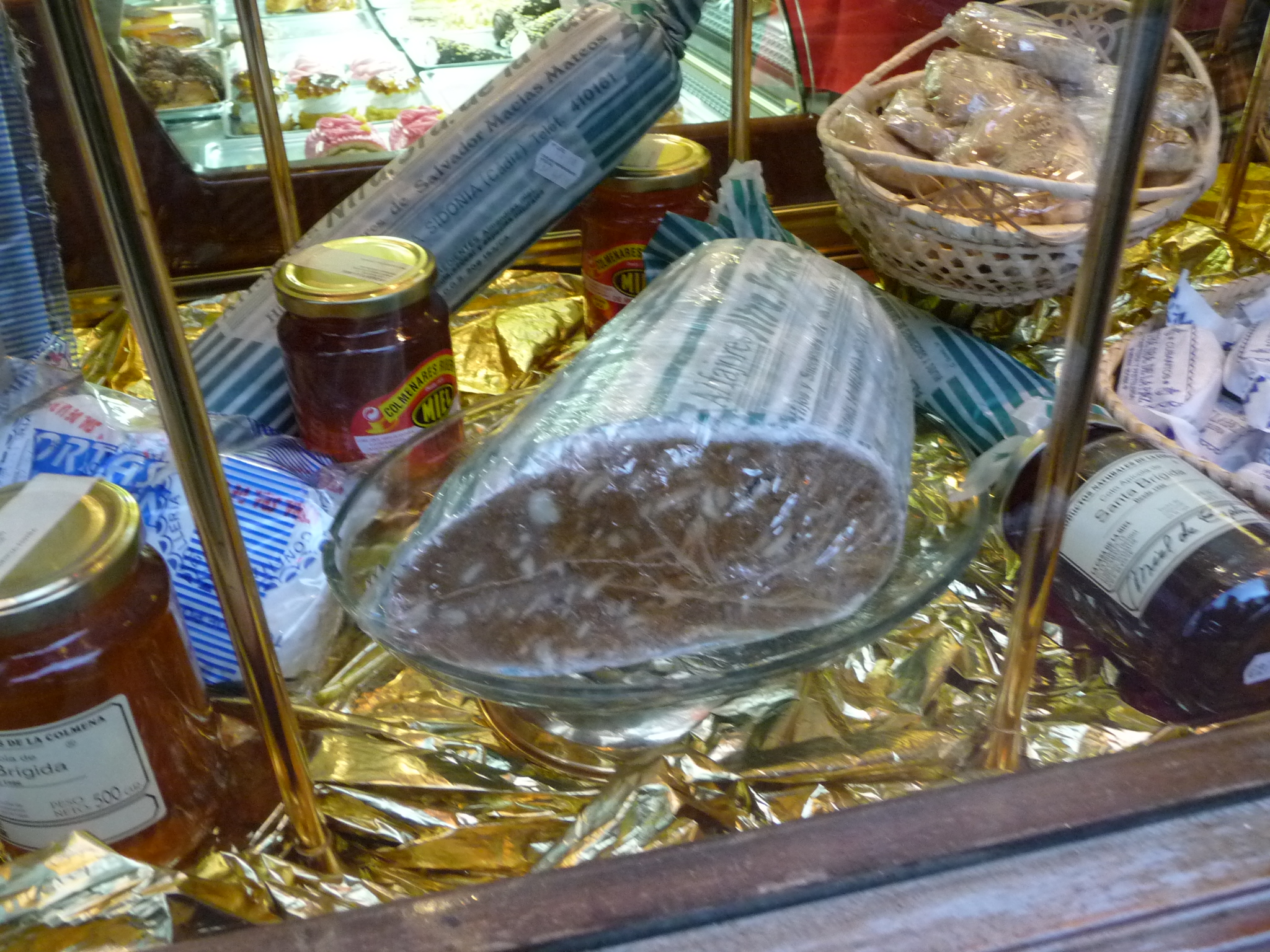
Large size Alfajor, Andalusian Christmas pastry

== See also ==
- Duke of Medina Sidonia
- List of municipalities in Cádiz
