= Arthur Rubinstein discography =

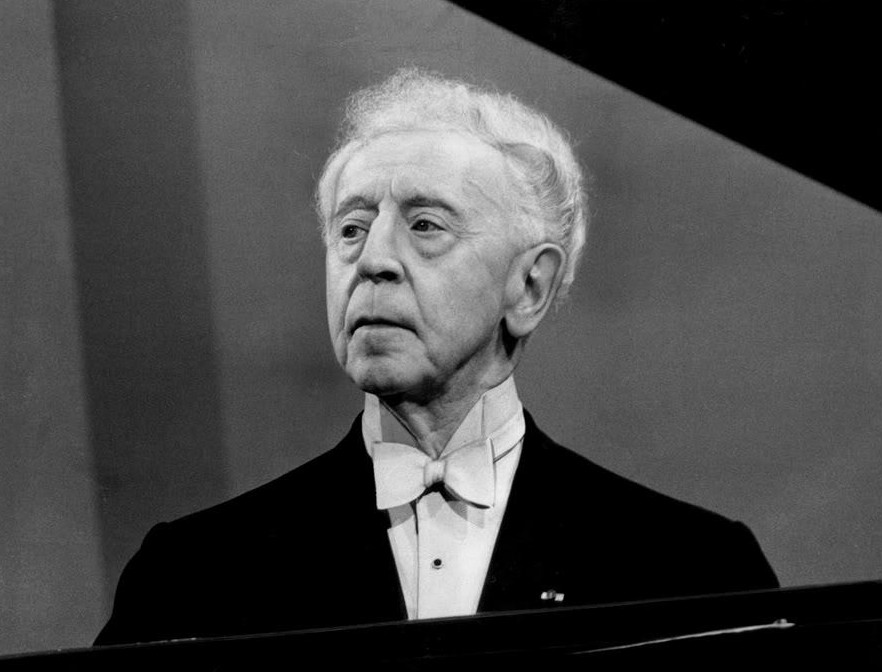
Arthur Rubinstein in 1968

Arthur Rubinstein (January 28, 1887 – December 20, 1982) was a Polish-American pianist. His first recording was made in 1910, but his major recording career was between 1928 and 1976.

== Overview ==
Rubinstein's first recording was made in 1910; he recorded Liszt’s Hungarian Rhapsody No. 10 for the Polish "Favorit" label. The pianist was displeased with the acoustic recording process, which he said made the piano sound “like a banjo” and did not record again until after the advent of electrical recording in 1925. However, Rubinstein made numerous player piano music rolls for the Aeolian Duo-Art system and the American Piano Company (AMPICO) in the 1920s.

Beginning in 1928, Rubinstein began to record extensively for the Victor Talking Machine Company/RCA Victor in the United States and the Gramophone Company/EMI Records (also known as His Master's Voice) in England. Rubinstein made a large number of solo, concerto and chamber music recordings regularly until his retirement in 1976. As recording technology improved, from 78rpm records, to LPs, and from monophonic to stereophonic recordings, Rubinstein rerecorded much of his repertoire. Thus, there are often three or more recordings of Rubinstein playing the same works. In 1985, RCA began releasing some of his recordings on compact disc. Most of his monophonic recordings were not issued on CD until 1999, when RCA issued a boxed set of 94 discs containing his complete recordings for that company (along with a recording of Brahms's Piano Concerto No. 1 which was originally released by Decca/London). From 1937 onward, he was billed as Artur Rubinstein on concert engagements and RCA Victor's American issued recordings at the instruction of his manager, Sol Hurok. Since 1999, all CD reissues have used the Arthur spelling, which the pianist preferred and used.

Rubinstein preferred to record in the studio, and during his lifetime only approved for release around three hours of live recordings. However, since the pianist's death, several labels have issued live recordings taken from radio broadcasts.

This discography contains only CD reissues of his recordings. Original issues on 78 rpm, LP and tape formats are not included.

== Albums ==
Year of issue	Album details	Recording date(s)	Record label
1999	Rubinstein Collection, Vol. 1: Brahms: Piano Concerto in B-flat major, Op. 83*; Tchaikovsky: Piano Concerto No. 1 in B-flat minor, Op. 23+; London Symphony Orchestra, Albert Coates, conductor*; London Symphony Orchestra, John Barbirolli, conductor+	1929/1932	RCA Red Seal
1999	Rubinstein Collection, Vol. 2: Chopin: Waltz in A-flat major, Op. 34, No. 1 / Waltz in C-sharp minor, Op. 64, No. 2 / Mazurka in D major, Op. 33, No. 2 / Mazurka in C minor, Op. 56, No. 3 / Mazurka in B major, Op. 63, No. 1; Liszt: Consolation in D-flat major, S. 172, No. 3 / Hungarian Rhapsody No. 10 in E major, S. 244, No. 10 / Liebesträume in A-flat major, S. 541, No. 3; Rachmaninoff: Prelude in C-sharp minor, Op. 3, No. 2; Debussy: Preludes, Book I: La cathédrale engloutie; Danseuses de Delphes; Ravel: Forlane, from Le tombeau de Couperin; Granados: The Maiden and the Nightingale; Falla: Dance of Terror / Ritual Fire Dance (both from El amor brujo); Villa-Lobos: A Prole do bebê, Book I: Moreninha / A pobrezinha / O Polichinelo	1928–1937	RCA Red Seal
1999	Rubinstein Collection, Vol. 3: Brahms: Piano Quartet in G minor, Op. 25* / Sonata for Violin & Piano in D minor, Op. 108+ / Cello Sonata in E minor, Op. 38^; Members of the Pro Arte Quartet*; Paul Kochanski, violin+; Gregor Piatigorsky, cello^	1932/1936	RCA Red Seal
1999	Rubinstein Collection, Vol. 4: Chopin: 6 Polonaises / Polonaise-Fantasie, Op. 61 / Andante Spianato and Grand Polonaise in E-flat major, Op. 22 / Barcarolle, Op. 60 / Berceuse, Op. 57	1928–1935	RCA Red Seal
1999	Rubinstein Collection, Vol. 5: Chopin: Piano Concerto in E minor, Op. 11* / Piano Concerto in F minor, Op. 21* / 19 Nocturnes; London Symphony Orchestra, Sir John Barbirolli, conductor*	1931–1937	RCA Red Seal
1999	Rubinstein Collection, Vol. 6: Chopin: 51 Mazurkas / 4 Scherzos	1932/1938	RCA Red Seal
1999	Rubinstein Collection, Vol. 7: Franck: Sonata for Violin and Piano in A major*; Fauré: Nocturne in A-flat major, Op.33, No. 3; Poulenc: Trois mouvements perpétuels / Napoli; Albéniz: Córdoba / Sevillanas / Evocación / Triana / Navarra; Jascha Heifetz, violin*	1929–1947	RCA Red Seal
1999	Rubinstein Collection, Vol. 8: Bach: Toccata, Adagio and Fugue in C major, BWV 564 (arr. Busoni); Schubert: Impromptu in a-flat major, D. 899, No. 4 / Minuetto from Sonata in G major, D. 894; Schumann: Romance in F-sharp major, Op. 28, No. 2 / Arabeske in C major, Op. 18 / Träumerei / Widmung (arr. Liszt); Brahms: Capriccio in B minor, Op. 76, No. 2 / Rhapsody in G minor, Op. 79, No. 2 / Wiegenlied, Op. 49, No. 4; Anton Rubinstein: Waltz-Caprice, in E-flat major	1928–1947	RCA Red Seal
1999	Rubinstein Collection, Vol. 9: Mozart: Piano Concerto in A major, K. 488*; Beethoven: Piano Concerto in G major, Op. 58+; Rachmaninoff: Rhapsody on a Theme of Paganini, Op. 43^; London Symphony Orchestra, Sir John Barbirolli, conductor*; Royal Philharmonic Orchestra, Sir Thomas Beecham, conductor+; London Philharmonia Orchestra, Walter Susskind, conductor^	1931/1947	RCA Red Seal
1999	Rubinstein Collection, Vol. 10: Beethoven: Sonata in C minor, Op. 13 Pathétique; Brahms: Rhapsody in E-flat major, Op. 119, No. 4 / Intermezzo in E-flat major, Op. 117, No. 1 / Intermezzo in B-flat minor, Op. 117, No. 2 / Intermezzo in A major, Op.118, No. 2 / Intermezzo in E-flat minor, Op. 118, No. 6 / Intermezzo in C major, Op.119, No. 3 / Rhapsody in B minor, Op. 79, No. 1 / Intermezzo in A minor, Op. 76, No. 7 / Rhapsody in G minor, Op. 79, No. 2 / Ballade in G minor, Op. 118, No. 3 / Hungarian Dance in F minor, WoO 1, No. 4 / Wiegenlied, Op. 49, No. 4	1941–1947	RCA Red Seal
1999	Rubinstein Collection, Vol. 11: Beethoven: Sonata No. 26 in E-flat major, Op. 81a Les Adieux / Moderato e grazioso from Sonata in E-flat major, Op. 31, No. 3; Franck: Prélude, Chorale, and Fugue, M. 21; Villa-Lobos: A Prole do bebê, Book 1, A. 140 / Alegria na horta, from Suite Floral, A. 117, No. 3; Szymanowski: Mazurkas, Op. 50, Nos. 1–4; Milhaud: Saudades do Brasil: Ipanema; Sumaré; Larenjeiras; Gershwin: Prelude No. 2; Liszt: Valse oubliée No. 1, S. 215, No. 1	1940–1946	RCA Red Seal
1999	Rubinstein Collection, Vol. 12: Beethoven: Piano Trio in B-flat major, Op. 97 Archduke; Schubert: Piano Trio in B-flat major, D. 898; Jascha Heifetz, violin; Emanuel Feuermann, cello	1941	RCA Red Seal
1999	Rubinstein Collection, Vol. 13: Grieg: Piano Concerto in A minor, Op. 16* / Ballade in G minor, Op. 24 / Album Leaf in C-sharp minor, Op. 28, No. 4 / At the Cradle, Op. 68, No. 5 / Spring Dance, Op. 47, No. 6 / Berceuse, Op. 38, No. 1 / Folk Song, Op. 38, No. 2 / Butterfly, Op. 43, No. 1 / Spring Dance, Op. 38, No. 5 / Shepherd Boy, Op. 54, No. 1 / Little Bird, Op. 43, No. 4 / Folk Song, Op. 12, No. 5 / Elves' Dance, Op. 12, No. 4 / March of the Dwarfs, Op. 54, No. 3; Philadelphia Orchestra, Eugene Ormandy, conductor*	1942/1953	RCA Red Seal
1999	Rubinstein Collection, Vol. 14: Beethoven: Piano Concerto in C minor, Op. 37* / Sonata in E-flat major, Op. 31, No. 3 / Sonata in F minor, Op. 57 Appassionata; NBC Symphony Orchestra, Arturo Toscanini, conductor*	1944–1946	RCA Red Seal
1999	Rubinstein Collection, Vol. 15: Rachmaninoff: Piano Concerto No. 2 in C minor, Op. 18*; Tchaikovsky: Piano Concerto No. 1 in B-flat minor, Op. 23+; NBC Symphony Orchestra, Vladimir Golschmann, conductor*; Minneapolis Symphony Orchestra, Dimitri Mitropoulos, conductor+	1946	RCA Red Seal
1999	Rubinstein Collection, Vol. 16: Chopin: Preludes, Op. 28 / Sonata in B-flat minor, Op. 35 / Berceuse, Op. 16 / Barcarolle, Op. 60 / Impromptu in G-flat major, Op. 51	1946	RCA Red Seal
1999	Rubinstein Collection, Vol. 17: Chopin: Piano Concerto in E minor, Op. 11* / Piano Concerto in F minor, Op. 21; Los Angeles Philharmonic, Alfred Wallenstein, conductor*; NBC Symphony Orchestra, William Steinberg, conductor+	1946/1953	RCA Red Seal
1999	Rubinstein Collection, Vol. 18: Granados: Andaluza, from Spanish Dances, Op. 37 / The Maiden and the Nightingale, from Goyescas /; Falla: Miller's Dance / Andaluza / Dance of Terror / Ritual Fire Dance / Nights in the Gardens of Spain*; Albéniz: Córdoba / Evocación, from Iberia / Navarra / Sevillanas; Mompou: Cançones i dansas Nos. 1 & 6; St. Louis Symphony Orchestra, Vladimir Golschmann, conductor*	1941–1955	RCA Red Seal
1999	Rubinstein Collection, Vol. 19: Mozart: Piano Concerto in A major, K. 488*; Schumann: Piano Concerto in A minor, Op. 54+ / The Prophet Bird, from Waldszenen, Op. 82 / Arabeske, Op. 18 / Träumerei, from Kinderszenen, Op. 15 / Widmung (arr. Liszt); St. Louis Symphony Orchestra, Vladimir Golschmann, conductor*; RCA Victor Symphony Orchestra, William Steinberg, conductor+	1946–1949	RCA Red Seal
1999	Rubinstein Collection, Vol. 20: Schumann: Carnaval, Op. 9 / Novellette in F major, Op. 21, No. 1 / Nachtstück in F major, Op. 23, No. 4 / Romance in F-sharp major, Op. 28, No. 2 / Fantasiestücke, Op. 12	1949/1953	RCA Red Seal
1999	Rubinstein Collection, Vol. 21: Brahms: Sonata in F Minor, Op. 5 / Capriccio in B minor, Op. 76, No. 2 / Intermezzo in B-flat minor, Op. 117, No. 2 / Rhapsodies, Op. 79 / Rhapsody in E-flat major, Op. 119, No. 4	1949/1953	RCA Red Seal
1999	Rubinstein Collection, Vol. 22: Brahms: Piano Concerto in B-flat major, Op. 83*; Grieg: Piano Concerto in A minor, Op. 16; Boston Symphony Orchestra, Charles Munch, conductor*; RCA Victor Symphony Orchestra, Antal Dorati, conductor	1949/1952	RCA Red Seal
1999	Rubinstein Collection, Vol. 23: Fauré: Piano Quartet in C minor, Op. 15; Schumann: Piano Quintet in E-flat major, Op. 44; Paganini Quartet	1949	RCA Red Seal
1999	Rubinstein Collection, Vol. 24: Brahms: Piano Trio in B major, Op. 8*; Mendelssohn: Piano Trio in D minor, Op. 49; Jascha Heifetz, violin; Emanuel Feuermann, cello*; Gregor Piatigorsky, cello	1941/1950	RCA Red Seal
1999	Rubinstein Collection, Vol. 25: Ravel: Piano Trio in A minor; Tchaikovsky: Piano Trio in A minor, Op. 50; Jascha Heifetz, violin; Gregor Piatigorsky, cello	1950	RCA Red Seal
1999	Rubinstein Collection, Vol. 26: Chopin: 21 Nocturnes / 4 Scherzos / Trois Nouvelles Etudes / Fantasie-Impromptu in C-sharp minor, Op. 66	1950–1958	RCA Red Seal
1999	Rubinstein Collection, Vol. 27: Chopin: 51 Mazurkas / 4 Impromptus	1952–1957	RCA Red Seal
1999	Rubinstein Collection, Vol. 28: Chopin: 6 Polonaises / Polonaise-Fantasie, Op. 61 / Andante Spianato and Grand Polonaise in E-flat major, Op. 22	1950	RCA Red Seal
1999	Rubinstein Collection, Vol. 29: Chopin: 14 Waltzes / Fantasie, Op. 49 / Barcarolle, Op. 60 / Berceuse, Op. 57	1953–1958	RCA Red Seal
1999	Rubinstein Collection, Vol. 30: Franck: Prelude, Chorale, and Fugue, M. 21; Debussy: La plus que lente / Hommage à Rameau / Poissons d'or / Preludes, Book I: La fille aux cheveux de lin; La cathédrale engloutie; Minstrels / Preludes, Book II: La terrasse des audiences du clair de lune; Ondine / Masques; Granados: The Maiden and the Nightingale; Liszt: Liebesträume, in A-flat major, S. 541, No. 3; Schubert: Impromptu in G-flat major, D. 899, No. 3 / Impromptu in A-flat major, D. 899, No. 4; Mendelssohn: Spinning Song, Op. 67, No. 4	1950–1953	RCA Red Seal
1999	Arthur Rubinstein Plays Great Piano Concertos (Sony Classical)	1953	RCA Red Seal
1999	Rubinstein Collection, Vol. 31: Liszt: Funérailles, S.173, No. 7 / Valse-Impromptu, S. 213 / Valse oubliée No. 1, S. 215, No. 1 / Mephisto Waltz No. 1, S. 514 / Liebesträume in A-flat major, S. 541, No. 3 / Hungarian Rhapsody No. 10 in E major, S.244, No. 10 / Consolation in D-flat major, S. 172, No. 3 / Hungarian Rhapsody No. 12 in C-sharp minor, S. 244, No. 12; Anton Rubinstein: Barcarolle No. 3 in G minor, Op. 50, No. 3 / Barcarolle No. 4 in G major / Waltz-Caprice in E-flat major	1950–1955	RCA Red Seal
1999	Rubinstein Collection, Vol. 32: Liszt: Piano Concerto in E-flat major, S. 124*; Falla: Nights in the Gardens of Spain, G. 49+; Szymanowski: Symphonia Concertante, Op. 60^; Dallas Symphony Orchestra, Antal Dorati, conductor*; San Francisco Symphony Orchestra, Enrique Jorda, conductor+; Los Angeles Philharmonic, Alfred Wallenstein, conductor^		RCA Red Seal
1999	Rubinstein Collection, Vol. 33: Beethoven: Sonata in C minor, Op. 13 Pathétique / Sonata in C major, Op. 53 Waldstein / Sonata in F minor, Op. 57 Appassionata	1954	RCA Red Seal
1999	Rubinstein Collection, Vol. 34: Brahms: Piano Concerto in D minor, Op. 15* / Capriccio in B minor, Op. 76, No. 2 / Intermezzo in E-flat minor, Op. 118, No. 6 / Rhapsody in B minor, Op. 79, No. 1; Chicago Symphony Orchestra, Fritz Reiner, conductor*		RCA Red Seal
1999	Rubinstein Collection, Vol. 35: Rachmaninoff: Piano Concerto No. 2 in C minor, Op. 18* / Rhapsody on a theme of Paganini, Op. 43* / Prélude in C-sharp minor, Op. 3, No. 2; Chicago Symphony Orchestra, Fritz Reiner, conductor*		RCA Red Seal
1999	Rubinstein Collection, Vol. 36: Beethoven: The Five Piano Concertos* / Sonata in E-flat major, Op. 31, No. 3; Haydn: Andante with variations for piano in F minor, H. 17, No. 6; Symphony of the Air, Josef Krips, conductor*		RCA Red Seal
1999	Rubinstein Collection, Vol. 37: Grieg: Piano Concerto in A minor, Op. 16*; Tchaikovsky: Piano Concerto No. 1 in B-flat minor, Op. 23+; RCA Victor Symphony Orchestra, Alfred Wallenstein, conductor*; Boston Symphony Orchestra, Erich Leinsdorf, conductor+		RCA Red Seal
1999	Rubinstein Collection, Vol. 38: Brahms: Piano Concerto in B-flat major, Op. 83* / Intermezzo in B-flat minor, Op. 117, No. 2 / Intermezzo in E minor, Op. 116, No. 5 / Rhapsody in G minor, Op. 79, No. 2; RCA Victor Symphony Orchestra, Josef Krips, conductor*		RCA Red Seal
1999	Rubinstein Collection, Vol. 39: Schumann: Piano Concerto in A minor, Op. 54* / Symphonic Etudes, Op. 13 / Arabeske, Op. 18 / The Prophet Bird, from Waldszenen, Op. 82; RCA Victor Symphony Orchestra, Josef Krips, conductor*		RCA Red Seal
1999	Rubinstein Collection, Vol. 40: Beethoven: Sonata for violin & piano in F major, Op. 24 Spring / Sonata for violin & piano in G major, Op. 30, No. 3 / Sonata for violin & piano in A major, Op. 47 Kreutzer; Henryk Szeryng violin		RCA Red Seal
1999	Rubinstein Collection, Vol. 41: Brahms: Sonata for violin & piano in G major, Op. 78 / Sonata for Violin & Piano in A major, Op. 100 / Sonata for Violin & Piano in D minor, Op. 108; Henryk Szeryng, violin		RCA Red Seal
1999	Rubinstein Collection, Vol. 42 Carnegie Hall Highlights: Debussy: Preludes, Book I: La cathédrale engloutie / Poissons d'or / Hommage à Rameau / Preludes, Book II: Ondine; Szymanowski: Mazurkas, Op. 50, Nos. 1–3, 6; Prokofiev: Visions fugitives, Op. 22 (selection); Villa-Lobos: A Prole do bebê, Book I: Branquinha, Negrinha, Bruxa, Moreninha, A pobresinha, O Polichinelo; Schumann: Arabeske, Op. 18; Albéniz: Navarra	1961	RCA Red Seal
1999	Rubinstein Collection, Vol. 43: Ravel: Valses nobles et sentimentales / Forlane, from Le tombeau de Couperin / La vallée des cloches, from Miroirs; Poulenc: Trois mouvements perpétuels, FP 14 / Intermezzo in A-flat major, FP 118 / Intermezzo for piano in D-flat major, FP 71, No. 2; Fauré: Nocturne in A-flat major, Op.33, No. 3; Chabrier: Scherzo-valse, from Pièces pittoresques; Debussy: Estampes: La soirée dans Grenade; Jardins sous la pluie / Images, Book I: Hommage à Rameau; Reflets dans l'eau / Images, Book II: Poissons d'or / La plus que lente		RCA Red Seal
1999	Rubinstein Collection, Vol. 44: Chopin: Piano Concerto in E minor, Op. 11* / Piano Concerto in F minor, Op. 21+ / Trois nouvelles études; New Symphony Orchestra of London, Stanislaw Skrowaczewski, conductor*; Symphony of the Air, Alfred Wallenstein, conductor+		RCA Red Seal
1999	Rubinstein Collection, Vol. 45: Chopin: 4 Ballades / 4 Scherzos / Tarantelle, Op. 43		RCA Red Seal
1999	Rubinstein Collection, Vol. 46: Chopin: Sonata in B-flat minor, Op. 35 / Sonata in B minor, Op. 58 / Fantasie, Op. 49 / Barcarolle, Op. 60 / Berceuse, Op. 57		RCA Red Seal
1999	Rubinstein Collection, Vol. 47: Chopin: 14 Waltzes / 4 Impromptus / Bolero, Op. 19		RCA Red Seal
1999	Rubinstein Collection, Vol. 48: Chopin: 6 Polonaises / Polonaise-Fantasie, Op. 61 / Andante Spianato and Grand Polonaise in E-flat major, Op. 22	1964	RCA Red Seal
1999	Rubinstein Collection, Vol. 49 (Sony Classical): Chopin: 19 Nocturnes: Opp. 9, 15, 27, 32, 37, 48, 55, 62, 72	1965	RCA Red Seal
1999	Rubinstein Collection, Vol. 50: Chopin: 51 Mazurkas		RCA Red Seal
1999	Rubinstein Collection, Vol. 51: Schumann: Carnaval, Op. 9 / Fantasiestücke, Op. 12 / Romance in F-sharp major, Op. 28, No. 2 / The Prophet Bird, from Waldszenen, Op. 82 / Novelettes, Op. 21: No. 1 in F major; No. 2 in D major		RCA Red Seal
1999	Rubinstein Collection, Vol. 52: Schumann: Kreisleriana, Op. 16 / Fantasie in C major, Op. 17		RCA Red Seal
1999	Rubinstein Collection, Vol. 53: Schumann: Piano Concerto in A Minor, Op. 54*; Liszt: Piano Concerto in E-flat major, S. 124+; Saint-Saëns: Piano Concerto in G minor, Op. 22^; Chicago Symphony Orchestra, Carlo Maria Giulini, conductor*; RCA Victor Symphony Orchestra, Alfred Wallenstein, conductor+; Symphony of the Air, Alfred Wallenstein, conductor^		RCA Red Seal
1999	Rubinstein Collection, Vol. 54: Schubert: Sonata in B-flat major, D. 960 / Fantasy in C major, D. 760 Wanderer / Impromptu in G-flat major, D. 899, No. 3 / Impromptu in A-flat major, D. 899, No. 4	1961/1965	RCA Red Seal
1999	Rubinstein Collection, Vol. 55: Beethoven: Sonata in C major, Op. 2, No. 3; Schubert: Sonata in B-flat major, D. 960		RCA Red Seal
1999	Rubinstein Collection, Vol. 56: Beethoven: Sonata in C minor, Op. 13 Pathétique / Sonata in C-sharp minor, Op. 27, No. 2 Moonlight / Sonata in F minor, Op. 57 Appassionata / Sonata in E-flat major, Op. 81a Les Adieux		RCA Red Seal
1999	Rubinstein Collection, Vol. 57: Beethoven: Piano concerto in C major, Op. 15 / Piano concerto in C minor, Op. 37; Boston Symphony Orchestra, Erich Leinsdorf, conductor		RCA Red Seal
1999	Rubinstein Collection, Vol. 58: Beethoven: Piano Concerto in G major, Op. 58 / Piano Concert in E-flat major, Op. 73 Emperor; Boston Symphony Orchestra, Erich Leinsdorf, conductor		RCA Red Seal
1999	Rubinstein Collection, Vol. 59: Beethoven: Piano Concerto in B-flat major, Op. 19; Brahms: Piano Concerto in D minor, Op. 15; Boston Symphony Orchestra, Erich Leinsdorf, conductor	1964/1967	RCA Red Seal
1999	Rubinstein Collection, Vol. 60: Grieg: Piano Concerto in A minor, Op. 16*; Rachmaninoff: Piano Concerto No. 2 in C minor, Op. 18+; RCA Victor Symphony Orchestra, Alfred Wallenstein, conductor*; Philadelphia Orchestra, Eugene Ormandy, conductor+	1961/1971	RCA Red Seal
1999	Rubinstein Collection, Vol. 61: Mozart: Piano Concertos K. 453, K. 466, K. 467, K. 488, K. 491*; RCA Victor Symphony Orchestra, Alfred Wallenstein & Josef Krips*, conductors		RCA Red Seal
1999	Rubinstein Collection, Vol. 62 - Recital in Moscow: Chopin: Polonaise in F-sharp minor, Op. 44 / Impromptu in G-flat major, Op. 51 / Nocturne in D-flat major, Op. 27, No. 2 / Sonata in B-flat minor, Op. 35 / Barcarolle, Op. 60 / Etudes, Op. 10, Nos. 4 & 5 / Etudes, Op. 25, Nos. 1 & 5 / Waltz in A minor, Op. 34, No. 2 / Polonaise in A-flat major, Op. 53 / Waltz in A-flat major, Op. 34, No. 1; Debussy: Ondine, from Preludes, Book II; Villa-Lobos: Polichinelo, from A Prole do bebê, Book I	1964	RCA Red Seal
1999	Rubinstein Collection, Vol. 63: Brahms: Sonata in F Minor, Op. 5 / Intermezzo, Op. 116, No. 6 / Romance, Op. 118, No. 5 / Four Ballades, Op. 10	1959/1970	RCA Red Seal
1999	Rubinstein Collection, Vol. 64: Brahms: Sonata in E minor for Cello & Piano, Op. 38* / Sonata in F major for Cello & Piano, Op. 99* / Intermezzo, Op. 117, No. 3 / Intermezzos, Op. 118, Nos. 2 & 6 / Intermezzos, Op. 119, Nos. 2 & 3; Gregor Piatigorsky, cello*		RCA Red Seal
1999	Rubinstein Collection, Vol. 65: Brahms: Piano Quartet in G minor, Op. 25 / Piano Quartet in C minor, Op. 60; Members of the Guarneri Quartet		RCA Red Seal
1999	Rubinstein Collection, Vol. 66: Dvořák: Piano Quartet in E-flat major, Op. 87; Schumann: Piano Quintet in E-flat major, Op. 44; Members of the Guarneri Quartet		RCA Red Seal
1999	Rubinstein Collection, Vol. 67: Brahms: Piano Quintet in F minor, Op. 34a; Dvořák: Piano Quintet in A major, Op. 81; Guarneri Quartet		RCA Red Seal
1999	Rubinstein Collection, Vol. 68: Bach: Chaconne in D minor, BWV 1004 (arr. Busoni); Franck: Prelude, Chorale, and Fugue, M. 21; Liszt: Sonata in B minor, S. 178 / Valse oubliée No. 1, S. 215, No. 1; Debussy: La plus que lente; Villa-Lobos: Polichinelo, from A Prole do bebê, Book I	1961–1970	RCA Red Seal
1999	Rubinstein Collection, Vol. 69: Chopin: Piano Concerto No. 2, Op. 21 / Fantasia on Polish Airs, Op. 13 / Andante Spianato and Grand Polonaise for piano and orchestra, Op. 22*; Philadelphia Orchestra, Eugene Ormandy, conductor; Symphony of the Air, Alfred Wallenstein, conductor*		RCA Red Seal
1999	Rubinstein Collection, Vol. 70: Saint-Saëns: Piano Concerto in G minor, Op. 22*; Falla: Nights in the Gardens of Spain* / Ritual Fire Dance; Franck: Symphonic Variations+; Prokofiev: March from The Love for Three Oranges; Philadelphia Orchestra, Eugene Ormandy, conductor*; Symphony of the Air, Alfred Wallenstein, conductor+		RCA Red Seal
1999	Rubinstein Collection, Vol. 71: Brahms: Piano Concerto in B-flat major, Op. 83*; Schumann: Fantasiestücke, Op. 12; Philadelphia Orchestra, Eugene Ormandy, conductor*	1971/1976	RCA Red Seal
1999	Rubinstein Collection, Vol. 72: Brahms: Piano Trio in B major, Op. 8 / Piano Trio in C major, Op. 87; Henryk Szeryng, violin; Pierre Fournier, cello	1972	RCA Red Seal
1999	Rubinstein Collection, Vol. 73: Brahms: Piano Trio No. 3, Op. 101; Schubert: Piano Trio No. 2, D. 929; Henryk Szeryng, violin; Pierre Fournier, cello		RCA Red Seal
1999	Rubinstein Collection, Vol. 74: Brahms: Piano Quartet in A major, Op. 26; Fauré: Piano Quartet in C minor, Op. 15; Members of the Guarneri Quartet		RCA Red Seal
1999	Rubinstein Collection, Vol. 75: Mozart: Piano Quartet in G minor, K. 478* / Piano Quartet in E-flat major, K. 493* / Rondo in A minor, K. 511; Members of the Guarneri Quartet*		RCA Red Seal
1999	Rubinstein Collection, Vol. 76: Schubert: Piano trio in B-flat major, D. 898; Schumann: Piano Trio in D minor, Op. 63; Henryk Szeryng, violin; Pierre Fournier, cello		RCA Red Seal
1999	Rubinstein Collection, Vol. 77: Beethoven: Piano Concerto in C major, Op.15 / Piano Concerto in B-flat major, Op. 19; London Philharmonic Orchestra, Daniel Barenboim, conductor	1975	RCA Red Seal
1999	Rubinstein Collection, Vol. 78: Beethoven: Piano Concerto in C minor, Op. 37 / Piano Concerto in G major, Op. 58; London Philharmonic Orchestra, Daniel Barenboim, conductor	1975	RCA Red Seal
1999	Rubinstein Collection, Vol. 79: Beethoven: Piano Concerto in E-flat major, Op. 73 Emperor* / Sonata in E-flat major, Op. 31, No. 3; London Philharmonic Orchestra, Daniel Barenboim, conductor*	1975–1976	RCA Red Seal
1999	Rubinstein Collection, Vol. 80 - Recital for Israel: Beethoven: Sonata in F minor, Op. 57 "Appassionata"; Schumann: Fantasiestücke, Op. 12; Debussy: Ondine, from Préludes, Book II / La plus que lente / Prélude from Suite Bergamasque; Chopin: Scherzo C-sharp minor, Op. 39 / Etude in E minor, Op. 25, No. 5 / Etude in C-sharp minor, Op. 10, No. 4 / Nocturne in F-sharp major, Op. 15, No. 2, / Polonaise in A-flat major, Op. 53 / Waltz in C-sharp minor, Op. 64, No. 2; Mendelssohn: Spinning Song, Op. 67, No. 4	1975	RCA Red Seal
1999	Rubinstein Collection, Vol. 81: Brahms: Piano Concerto in D minor, Op. 15; Israel Philharmonic Orchestra, Zubin Mehta, conductor	1976	RCA Red Seal (originally issued on Decca)
1999	Rubinstein Collection, Vol. 82: Saint-Saëns: Piano Concerto in G minor, Op. 22; Orchestre de la Societe des Concerts du Conservatoire, Philippe Gaubert, conductor; Debussy: Mouvement, from Images, Book II; Chopin: Prelude in C-sharp minor, Op. 45; Schumann: Novelette, Op. 21, No. 5; Albeniz: Evocacion, from Iberia; Three Interviews with Rubinstein; All material was previously unreleased and was available only as part of the complete Rubinstein Collection.	1939–1957	RCA Red Seal
2004	Chopin: Waltzes; Impromptus		RCA Red Seal
2007	Rubinstein plays Beethoven, Saint-Saëns, Villa-Lobos & Chopin	1957–1968	BBC Music
2008	Chopin: Nocturnes Nos, 1–19; Four Scherzi	1928–1937	EMI Classics
2009	The Great Concertos	1958–1976	RCA Red Seal
2009	The Original Jacket Collection 10-CD set: Chopin: Ballades, Mazurkas, Nocturnes, Polonaises, Scherzos, Sonatas, Waltzes, and assorted solo works from Rubinstein's stereo cycle.; Also includes 1946 monaural versions of Op. 28 Preludes and Op. 35 Sonata.	1946–1965	RCA Red Seal
2011	The Complete Album Collection 142 CD set Contains all previously issued RCA recordings, plus three CDs of previously unissued material drawn from Carnegie Hall performances in 1961: CD 140: Debussy: L'Isle joyeuse / La plus que lente / Preludes, Book II - No. 8, Ondine; Albeniz: Triana; Falla: el amor brujo: No. 11, Dance of Terror / The Three-Cornered Hat: Dance of the Miller's Wife; Granados: The Maiden and the Nightingale; Liszt: Harmonies Poetiques et Religieuses - No. 7, Funerailles / Valse oubliee No. l in F sharp Minor / Hungarian Rhapsody No. 12 in C sharp Minor; Scriabin: Nocturne for the Left-hand alone in D flat, Op. 9, No. 2; Stravinsky: Three Scenes from Petrouchka; CD 141: J. S. Bach-Busoni: Violin Partita No. 2 in D Minor, BWV 1004 – Chaconne; Brahms: Piano Sonata No. 3 in F Minor, Op. 5 / Intermezzo in B flat, Op. 117, No. 2 / Intermezzo in A, Op. 118, No. 2 / Intermezzo in E flat Minor, Op. 118, No. 6; Chopin: Mazurka in D, Op. 33, No. 2 / Nocturne No. 8 in D flat, Op. 27, No. 2; Schubert: Impromptu No. 4 in A flat, D. 899, No. 4, Op. 90, No. 4; CD 142: Chopin: Sonata No. 2 in B flat Minor, Op. 35, Funeral March / Prelude No. 4 in E Minor, Op. 28, No. 4 / Prelude No. 8 in F sharp Minor, Op. 28, No. 8 / Prelude No. 15 in D flat, Op. 28, No. 15, Raindrop Prelude No. 21 in B flat, Op. 28, No. 21 / Prelude No. 23 in F, Op. 28, No. 23 / Prelude No. 24 in D Minor, Op. 28, No. 24 / Berceuse in D flat, Op. 57 / Polonaise-Fantasie in A flat, Op. 61 / Fantasie-lmpromptu in C sharp Minor, Op. 66 / : Etude No. 14 in F Minor, Op. 25, No. 2 / Etude No. 15 in F, Op. 25, No. 3 / Etude No. 12 in C Minor, Op. 10, No. 12, Revolutionary / Polonaise No. 6 in A flat, Op. 53, Heroic; Also includes: DVD: Benefit recital for Israel; DVD: Rubinstein Remembered	1928–1976	Sony Classical/RCA Red Seal
