= Bésame Mucho =

1932 song written and composed by Consuelo Velázquez

"Bésame mucho"

Single by Consuelo Velázquez
- Language: Spanish
- Released: 1940
- Genre: Bolero
- Songwriter: Consuelo Velázquez

"Besame Mucho"

Single by Jimmy Dorsey and His Orchestra (Vocal Bob Eberle & Kitty Kallen)
- Language: Spanish
- B-side: "My Ideal"
- Released: December 1943
- Recorded: October 7, 1943
- Studio: Los Angeles
- Genre: Bolero
- Length: 2:59
- Label: Decca 18574
- Songwriters: Consuelo Velázquez, Sunny Skylar

"Bésame Mucho" (Spanish: [ˈbesame ˈmutʃo]; "Kiss Me A Lot") is a bolero song written in 1932 by Mexican songwriter Consuelo Velázquez. One of the most important songs in the history of Latin music, it became one of the most popular pop standards of the 20th century as well as a jazz standard. "Bésame Mucho" was recognized in 1999 as the most recorded and covered Spanish-language song of all time. Famous versions were sung by Trio Los Panchos and female vocalist Gigliola Cinquetti in 1968, and by Dalida in 1976. English lyrics to it were written by Sunny Skylar.

The song appeared in the film Follow the Boys (May 5, 1944) when it was played by Charlie Spivak and his Orchestra and in Cowboy and the Senorita (May 13, 1944) with vocal by Dale Evans. As the song crossed the Atlantic in 1944, it became one of the most recognizable melodies. It was also sung by Chris Isaak in the 2003 movie Mona Lisa Smile.

== Inspiration ==
According to Velázquez, she wrote this song even though she had never been kissed yet at the time, and kissing, as she heard, was considered a sin. She was inspired by the piano piece "Quejas, o la Maja y el Ruiseñor", from the 1911 suite Goyescas by Spanish composer Enrique Granados, which he later also included as "Aria of the Nightingale" in his 1916 opera of the same name.

== In politics ==
In 1990, a hitherto clandestine affair between two Brazilian government ministers, Bernardo Cabral (Minister of Justice) and Zélia Cardoso de Mello (Minister for Economy, Finance & Planning), was revealed to public knowledge as the couple danced cheek to cheek to "Bésame Mucho" during a birthday party held for Cardoso de Mello. A married father of three, Cabral was forced to resign as a result.

A few days later, at a ceremony in which Cardoso de Mello was due to receive her country's Order of Military Merit, the regimental band of the presidential guard, Os Dragões da Independência, struck up "Bésame Mucho" as she was presented with her medal. Its musical director, Lt. Geraldo Mendonça da Lima, was subsequently given 3 days' detention for insubordination.

== Notable versions ==
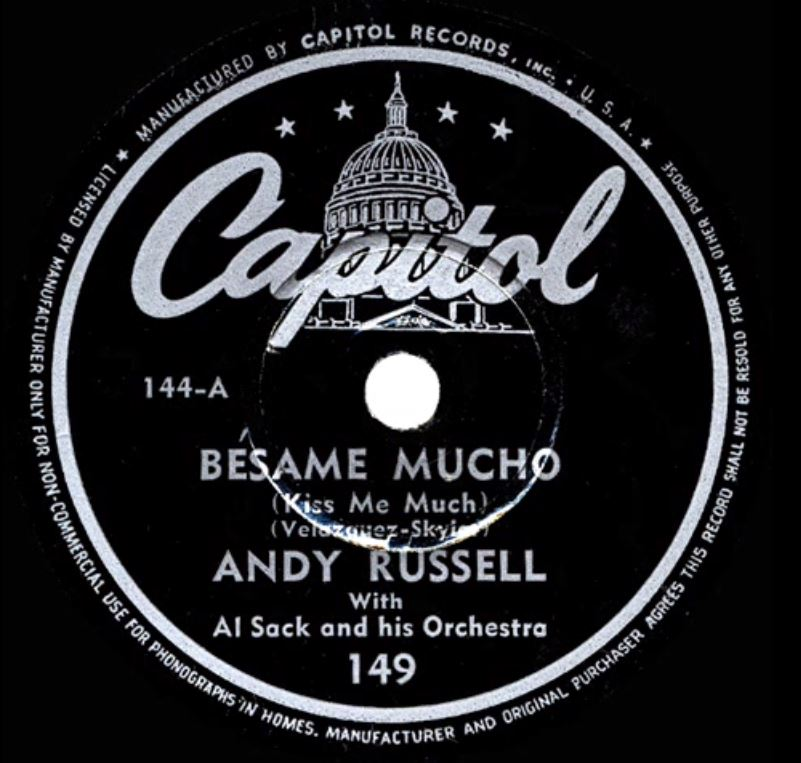
Capitol Records 78rpm record label for USA release of Andy Russell's "Bésame Mucho." Original issue. 1944

- Pedro Vargas (inducted into the Latin Grammy Hall of Fame in 2001)
- Bob Eberly and Kitty Kallen with Jimmy Dorsey & His Orchestra (reached number one in the United States in 1944)
- Andy Russell (reached No. 8 in the US in 1944)
- Velázquez herself recorded the song as a piano instrumental on her album Piano Interpretations (1955).
- Ray Conniff and His Orchestra and Chorus recorded this song on 25 March 1960, for the album Say It with Music (A Touch of Latin), issued originally on August 8, 1960. A worldwide hit and a trademark for Conniff for decades.
- The Coasters hit the Hot 100 with their version, which peaked at No. 70, in 1960.
- The Beatles (recorded during their Decca audition on January 1, 1962. A second version was recorded during their first session at Abbey Road Studios on June 6, 1962. The latter is included on The Beatles' Anthology 1). It was also performed by the band in 1969 at their Apple Studio and published in the documentary film Let It Be.
- Dean Martin recorded it for his album, Dino Latino in 1962.
- Jet Harris reached No. 22 in the UK with his version in 1962.
- Dalida reached No 5 in France and No 10 in Turkey in 1976.
- João Gilberto recorded a cover of the song for his 1977 bossa nova album Amoroso.
- Plácido Domingo (received a Grammy nomination for Best Latin Pop Performance in 1983)
- Luis Miguel on the album, Romances (1997), No. 1 on the Mexican ballads chart and among the top ten best-performing songs of 1998 in Venezuela.
- Zoé (nominated for a Latin Grammy for Record of the Year in 2012)
