= Castle of Torre-estrella =

- Castillo de Torre-estrella (Spanish)
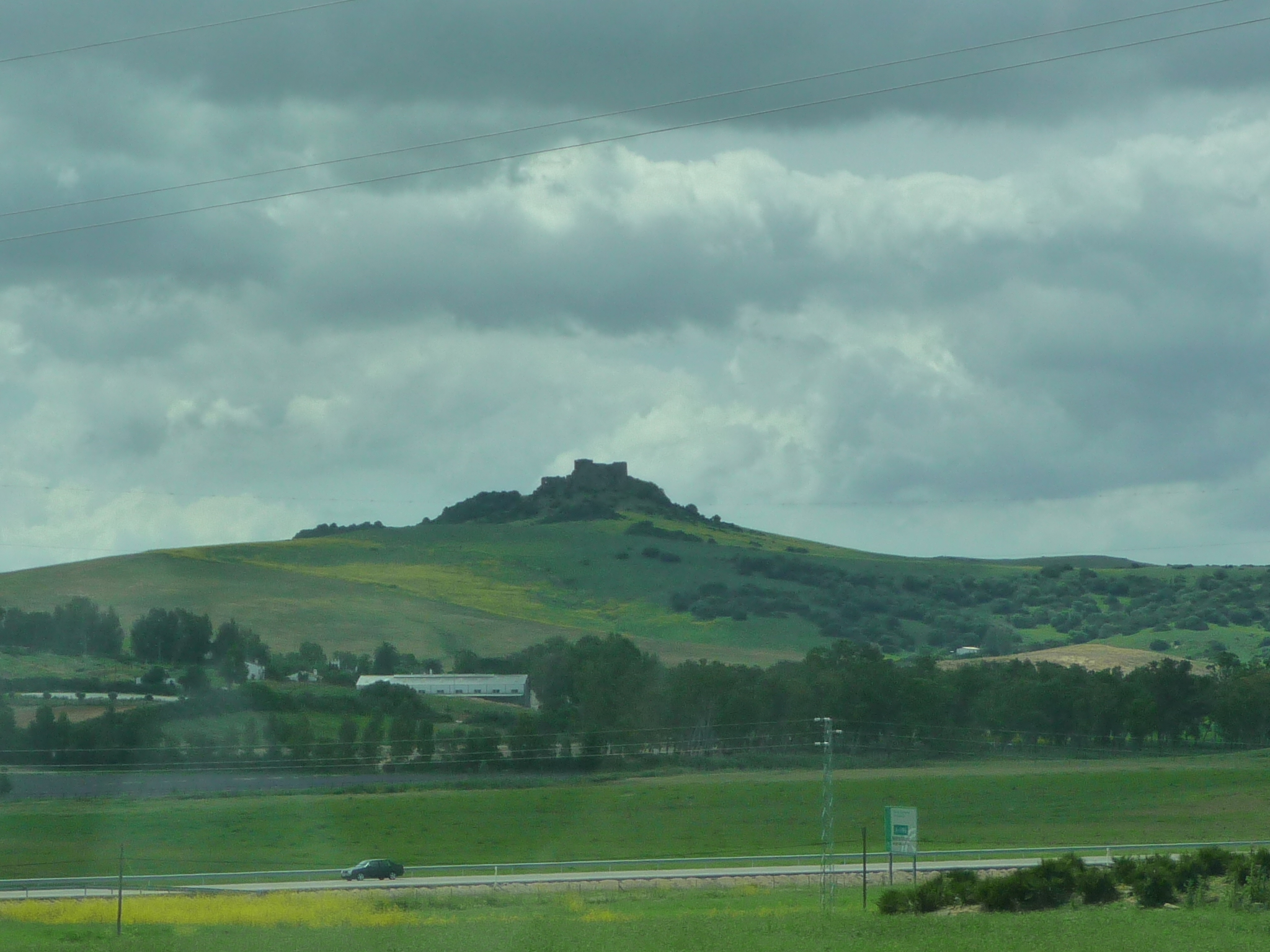

- Location within Spain
- 36.442479°N 5.850781°W
- Location: Medina Sidonia, Spain

Spanish Cultural Heritage
- Official name: Castillo de Torre-estrella
- Type: Non-movable
- Criteria: Monument
- Designated: 1993
- Reference no.: RI-51-0007604

The Castle of Torre-estrella (Spanish: Castillo de Torrestrella) is a castle located in Medina Sidonia, Spain. It was declared Bien de Interés Cultural in 1993.
