= Goyescas (opera) =

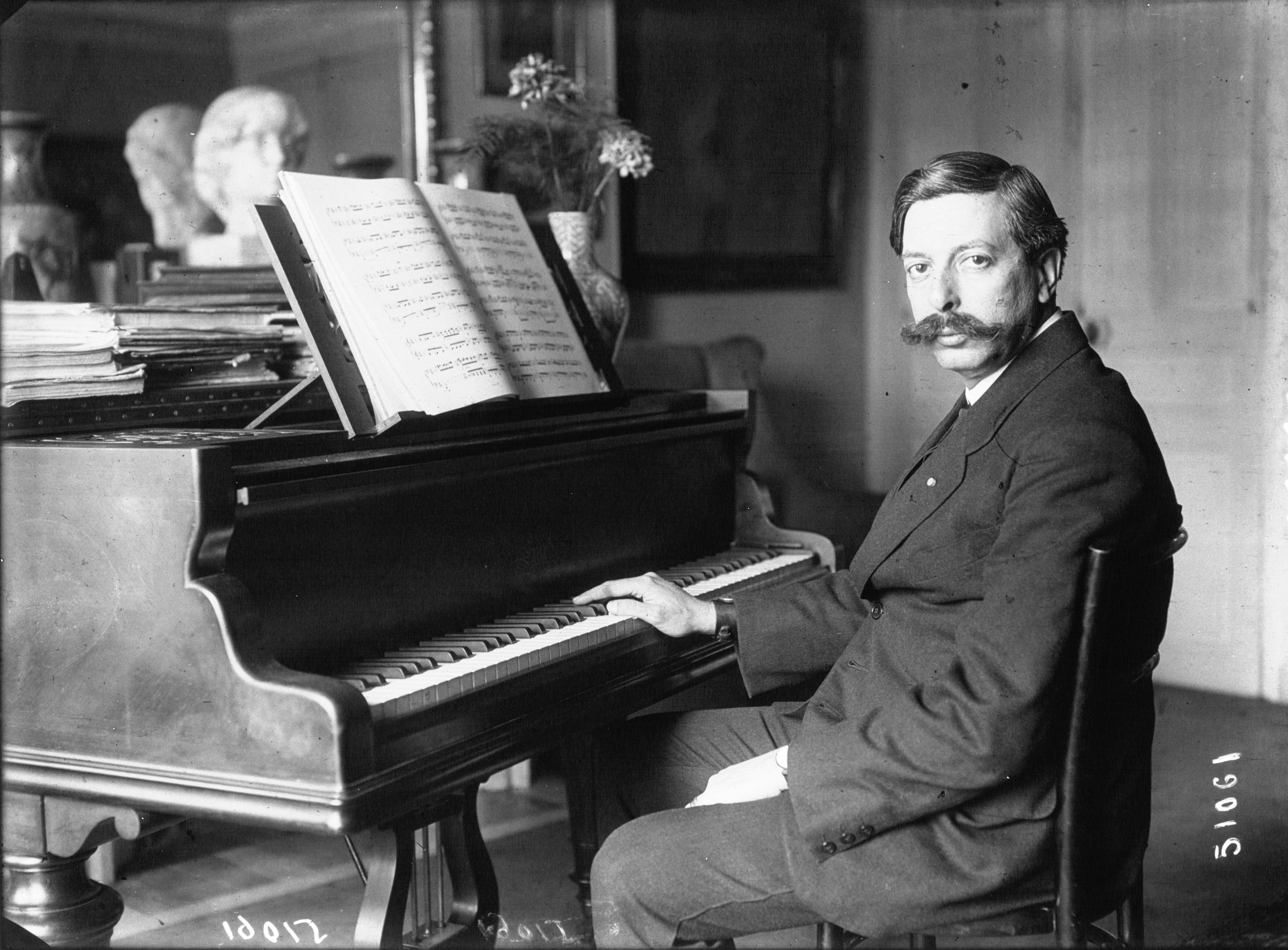
Enrique Granados in 1914.

Goyescas is an opera in one act and three tableaux, written in 1915 by the Spanish composer Enrique Granados. Granados composed the opera to a Spanish libretto by Fernando Periquet y Zuaznabar with melodies taken from his 1911 piano suite, which was also called Goyescas. The opera was first performed at the Metropolitan Opera in New York City on January 28, 1916.

== Performance history ==
Prevented by World War I from being presented at the Paris Opéra, the premiere of Goyescas took place on January 28, 1916 at the Metropolitan Opera. It was the first opera to be performed there in Spanish. Paired on a double bill with Leoncavallo's Pagliacci, the opera's cast included the leading artists Giovanni Martinelli and Giuseppe De Luca. The stage production was directed by Jules Speck. It featured sets by the Milanese designer Antonio Rovescalli, and costumes by G. B. Santoni that followed the paintings of Goya.

The opera was well received. In his review for the New York Times, Richard Aldrich wrote that the music was "profoundly felt" and possessed "an intensely national color". In spite of this success, the short opera has never found a permanent place in the opera repertoire. It has not yet been repeated at the Met following its original five performances. More recently, Goyescas was presented in a well-received production at Central City Opera (Colorado) in 2003.

The Intermezzo from the opera became a popular independent concert piece. It is performed in arrangements for orchestra, and for cello and piano.

A Spanish film of Goyescas, adapted from the opera, was made in 1942. It was directed by Benito Perojo and starred Imperio Argentina.

== Background ==
Granados considered his best opera to be María del Carmen (1898).

The opera Goyescas was based on themes from the famous piano suite of the same name which appeared in 1911. Granados was inspired to write the piano suite by the paintings of Francisco Goya. The composer wrote, "I am enamored with the psychology of Goya, with his palette, with him, with his muse the Duchess of Alba, with his quarrels with his models, his loves and flatteries. That whitish pink of the cheeks, contrasting with the blend of black velvet; those subterranean creatures, hands of mother-of-pearl and jasmine resting on jet trinkets, have possessed me."

After the enthusiastic response to the piano work, he was encouraged to compose the opera by Ernest Schelling, an American pianist who premiered the suite in the U.S. For the opera he orchestrated and augmented the themes to form a three-scene work. The libretto had to be fitted to existing melodies, the reverse of the usual way of writing an opera. Though the opera is rarely performed, the piano suite forms part of the standard Romantic piano repertoire.

The success of the Met premiere of Goyescas led indirectly to Granados's death. He was invited by President Woodrow Wilson to perform a piano recital at the White House, causing him to postpone his return to Spain. Granados and his wife lost their lives on March 24, 1916 when their ship, the French steamer Sussex, was torpedoed by a German U-boat in the English Channel.

== Roles ==
Role	Voice type	Premiere Cast, January 28, 1916 (Conductor: Gaetano Bavagnoli)
Rosario	soprano	Anna Fitziu
Fernando	tenor	Giovanni Martinelli
Pepa	mezzo-soprano	Flora Perini
Paquiro	baritone	Giuseppe De Luca
Singer	tenor	Max Bloch

== Synopsis ==
The story of Goyescas is based on a series of six paintings from Francisco Goya’s early career, inspired by the stereotypical young men and women of the majismo movement. These majos and majas are known for their bohemian attitude and soft spot for finery. The opening scene is directly based on his 1791 painting ‘El Pelele’, painted for Charles IV of Spain to hang in his textile mill, although the painting implies a satire of the monarch’s popularity.

=== First Tableau ===
The majos and majas are enjoying an afternoon outside the Church of San Antonio de la Florida. As the Manzanares River meanders in the distance, the fun loving troupe spend their time dancing, feasting, and playing a traditional game known as the pelele. This game involves a human replication made of straw being thrown up in the air by a group using a stretched out sheet. As they flirt and chatter, Paquiro enters, surrounded by women. He calls all the ladies unique garden flowers, and they swoon for him, but all of them know who he supposedly belongs to. Pepa enters the scene riding her dog cart, and the men crowd around her excitedly, as she thanks them for making her feel welcome. Suddenly, the attention is on two richly dressed lackeys bearing a sedan-chair, and in which the high born lady Rosario waits for her lover. Paquiro wastes no time approaching this mystery woman. He recalls a time when she appeared at one of their lantern-lit balls, and invites her again that very night. Rosario ignores him, but her indifference goes unnoticed by Fernando, captain of the royal guard, who was hiding away and spying on her and Paquiro. Fernando assumes that she was flirting, and although she flatly denies it, he does not trust her. They continue arguing while Pepa and the ladies mock them. Fernando decides that Rosario will accept the invitation, but that he will accompany her. They leave promptly, and after sharing their plans to ruin the lovers, Pepa and Paquiro leave on their dog cart.

=== Second Tableau ===
At the ball that night, all the majas are dancing, while the majos watch eagerly. Fernando enters dragging Rosario, whom Pepa proceeds to make fun of the minute she walks through the door. Fernando assures Rosario that he will defend her honor. Upon this, Paquiro makes a spectacle of asking Rosario to dance, and Pepa questions his motives jealously. Fernando insults Paquiro's honor, while Rosario protests. Paquiro suggests a duel to prove his valor. A brawl begins, the women holding back Paquiro and the men from rushing Fernando, and Rosario faints in the excitement. After setting the time and place of the duel, Fernando leaves with Rosario. Pepa, returning to the center of attention, engages the crowd in a fandango.

=== Third Tableau ===
Later that night, Rosario sits on a bench in the palace garden, listening to the sad song of a nightingale under the light of the moon. As she moves to go inside, Fernando approaches the house, calling to her. She responds sorrowfully, but always lovingly, and he doubts her claims of total devotion. They share a loving moment, ruined by the presence of Paquiro, who is dressed in a black cloak with Pepa trailing furtively. Fernando makes ready to leave, and Rosario clings to him, begging him to stay. Fernando tears himself away, promising to return victorious, and leaves. Rosario follows, and the duel begins. Two screams signal the end of the duel, one by Fernando being mortally wounded, the other by Rosario. Paquiro flees, dragging his cloak behind him. Rosario drags the mortally wounded Fernando to the bench where they had just shared their tender moment. She holds him against her bosom, and they share one last kiss before he dies in her arms.

== Notable references in other pieces of art ==
Mexican songwriter Consuelo Velázquez based her 1940 song Bésame Mucho on the melody of the Aria of the Nightingale from the third tableau.

== Recordings ==
- Consuelo Rubio (Rosario), Gines Torrano (Fernando), Ana-Maria Iriarte (Pepa), Manuel Ausensi (Paquiro); Madrid Cantores, Spanish National Orchestra, Ataúlfo Argenta (conductor); Decca Records LXT 5338 (1 LP) 1955
- María Bayo (Rosario), Ramón Vargas (Fernando), Lola Casariego (Pepa), Enrique Baquerizo (Paquiro); Orfeón Donostiarra, Orquesta Sinfónica de Madrid, Antoni Ros-Marbà (conductor); Auvidis V4791 (1 CD) 1996
- Rafaella Angeletti (Rosario), Yikun Chung (Fernando), Francesca Franci (Pepa), Davide Damiani (Paquiro); Coro ed Orchestra del Teatro Lirico di Cagliari, Rafael Frühbeck de Burgos (conductor); Dynamic CDS380 (CD) 2001 live
- Maria Toledo, Nancy Fabiola Herrera, Gustavo Pena, Lidia Vinyes Curtis, BBC Singers, BBC Symphony Orchestra, Josep Pons harmonia mundi, DDD/LA, 2018
