= Reja =

Reja is a Spanish term for grillwork. It typically refers to iron screens, often of a decorative nature.

In medieval times the word was used for ploughshare. It is used in this sense in the Becerro Galicano.

== Domestic rejas ==
In a domestic context, rejas usually refers to window grilles.

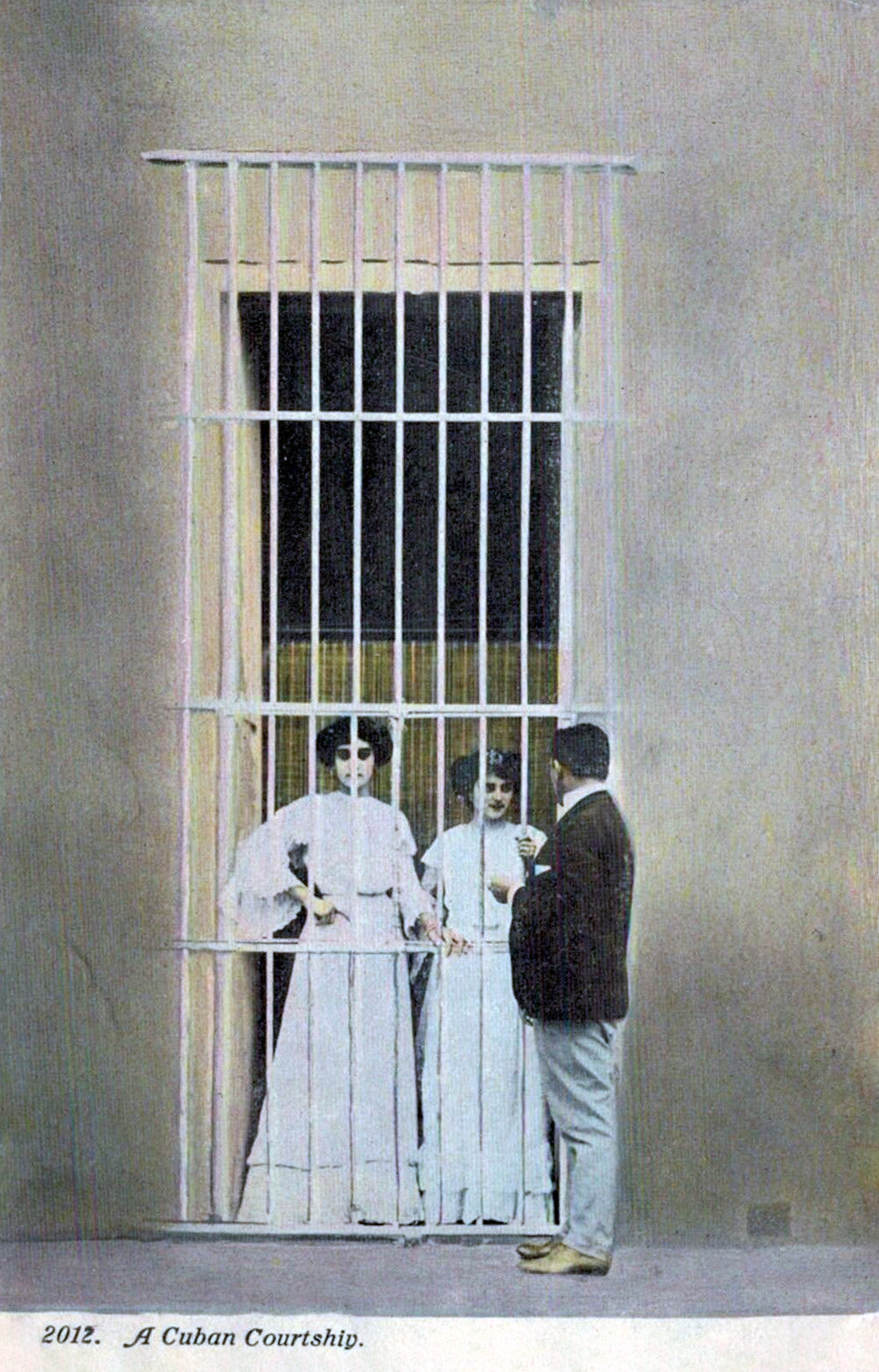

They played a role in Spanish courtship rituals, and are referenced by Granados in Goyescas where the composer depicts a romantic dialogue between lovers.

== Ecclesiastical rejas ==
Inside cathedrals, fences were often placed in front of side chapels, the choir, or even in rood screens in front of the altar. Such rejas are commonly 25 to 30 ft (7.5 to 9 meters) high.

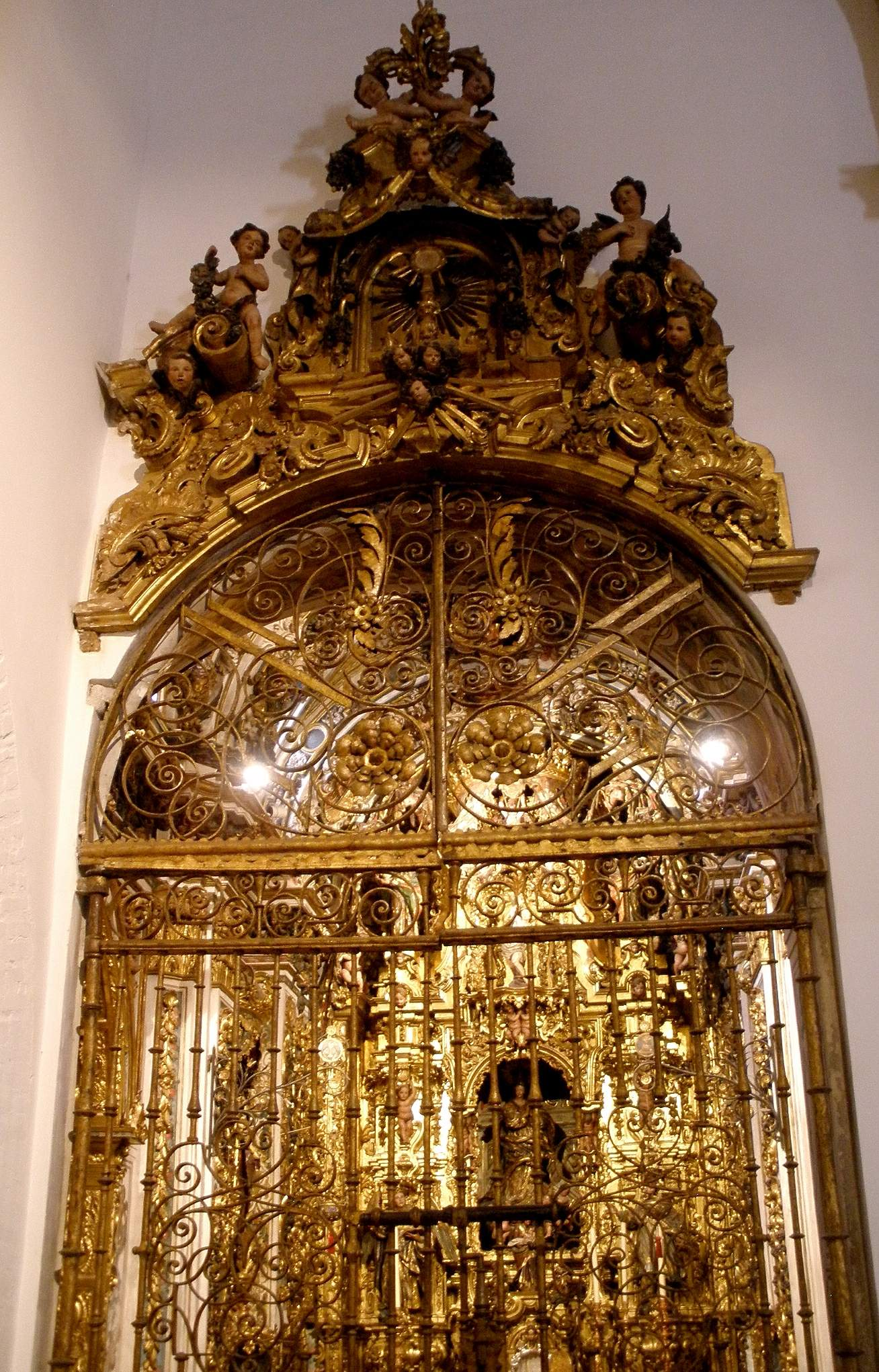
A reja in Seville

Crafters who made rejas were known as rejeros, or reja-makers.
