= Majo =

Class of Spanish society

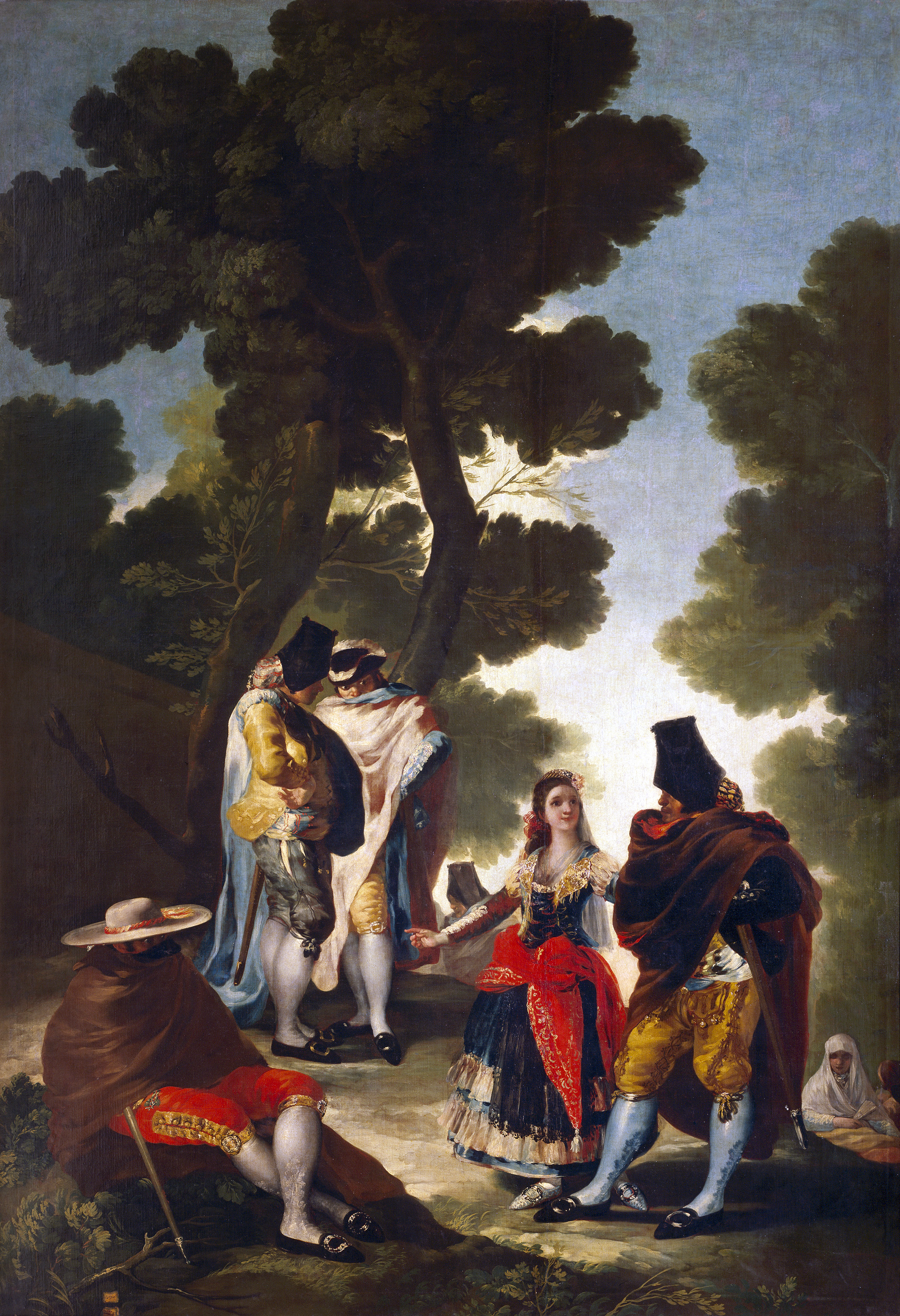
El paseo por Andalucía, by Francisco de Goya, depicts both majas and majos.

Majo (masc., [ˈma.xo]) or maja (fem., [ˈma.xa]), also manolo and manola, after the most popular names, were people from the lower classes of Spanish society, especially in Madrid, who distinguished themselves by their elaborate outfits and sense of style in dress and manners, as well as by their cheeky behavior. They flourished from the late 18th to early 19th century, and to some extent later. Majos and majas were one of the favorite subjects of some 19th-century Spanish painters.

The majos and majas outfits were exaggerations of traditional Spanish dress. The style stood in strong contrast to the French styles affected by many of the Spanish elite under the influence of the Enlightenment. Majos were known to pick fights with those they saw as afrancesados ("Frenchified" – fops).

== Etymology ==
The word is suggested to derive from Spanish majar, with the meaning of "bother," but a Romani etymology from masha, "fascinator, enticer," is also suggested; this word is the root of English masher. Other sources try to connect it to Maia and May queens.

== Popularity ==
Although majos of both sexes were frequent subjects of painter Francisco Goya, two of his majas, La maja vestida and La maja desnuda (the same model, clothed and nude respectively), would gain international renown.

The outfit of the maja would influence the costume of the eponymous protagonist of Georges Bizet's French opera Carmen in the mid-19th century.

In the 20th century, with the popularization of Spain as a tourist destination, the manola or maja, often holding a folding fan, increasingly gained recognition as the image of a stereotypical traditional Spanish woman. Thus the maja became one of the popular and informal symbols of Spain, along with the bullfighter, who took the place of the majo. Some of the 20th-century depictions of the maja became somewhat assimilated into the flamenco dancer (la bailaora). Nowadays, the increasing popularity of the maja has ended up eclipsing that of the majo.

The image of a maja was the trademark of the Jabón Maja Myrurgia soap, one of the classical souvenirs from Spain. The brand's portrait of the maja in the soap boxes and wrappings was based on the person of Carmen Tórtola Valencia (1882–1955), a famous Spanish dancer of the early 20th century.

== Gallery ==
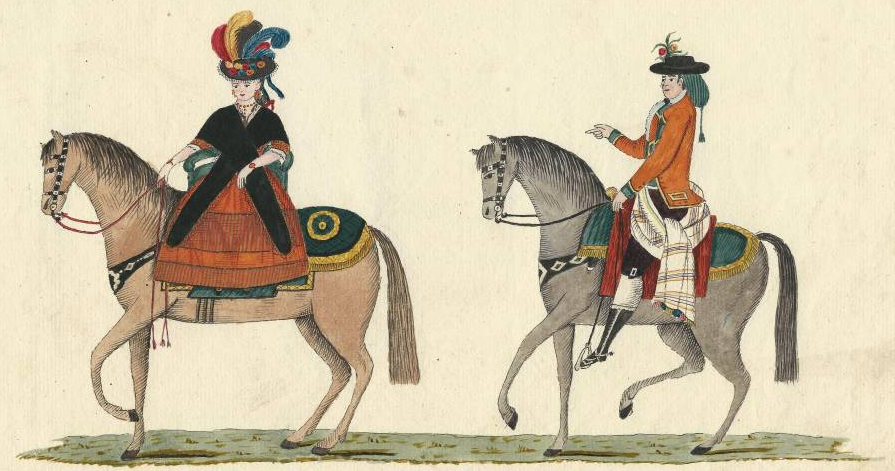
A couple of majos of colonial-era Buenos Aires, c. 1784–1806.

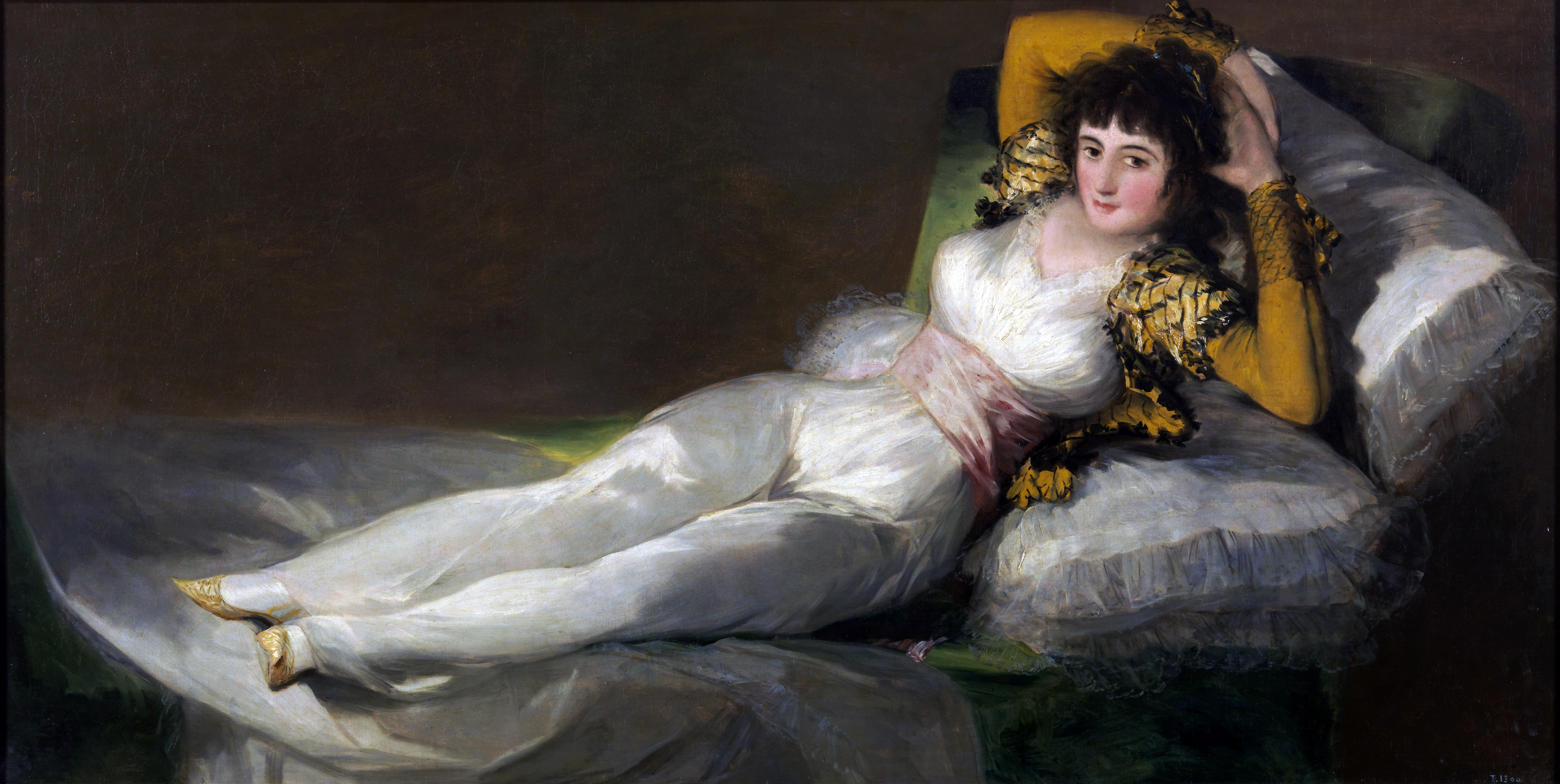
Goya's La maja vestida, c. 1798–1805

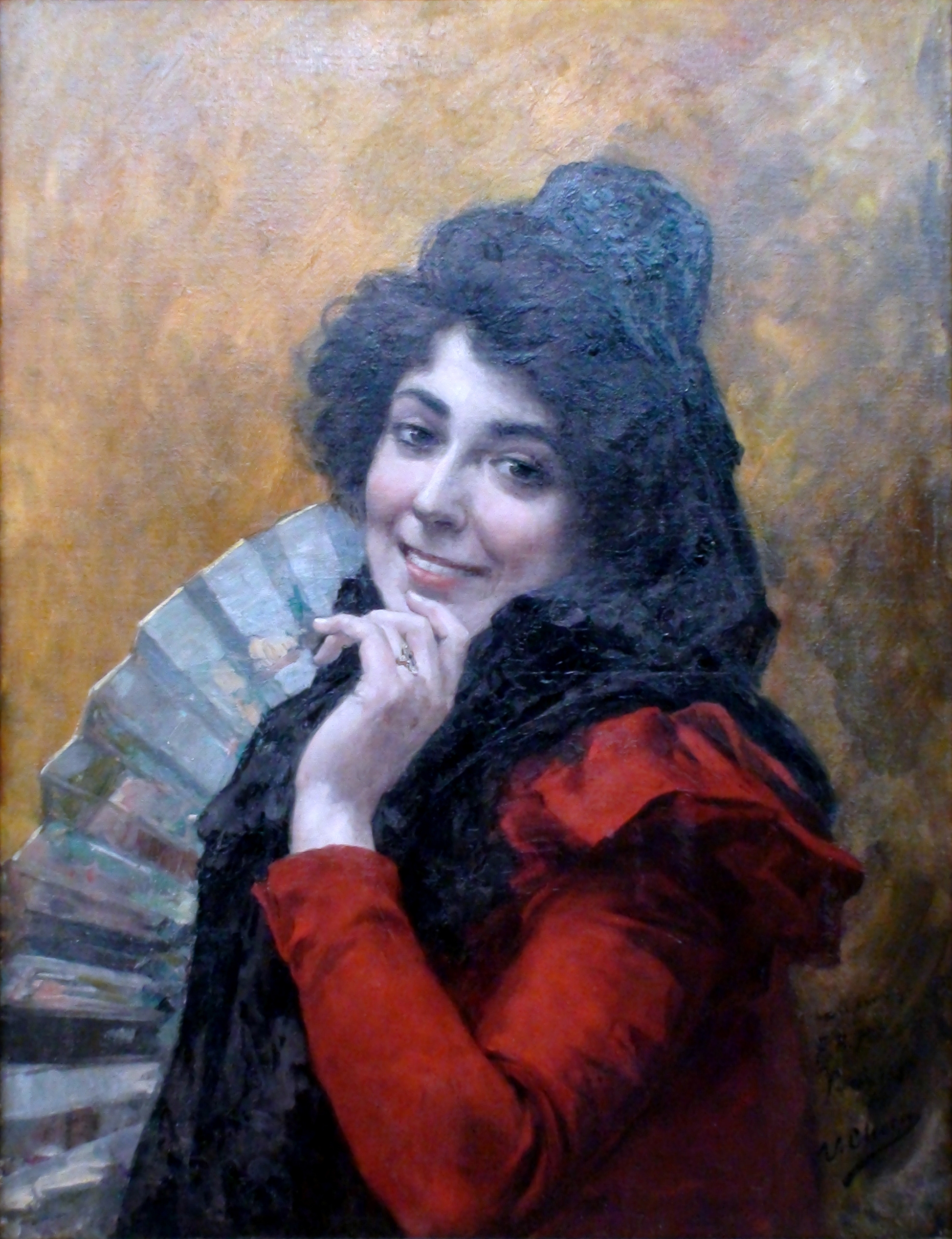
A typical manola with a folding fan by Ulpiano Checa

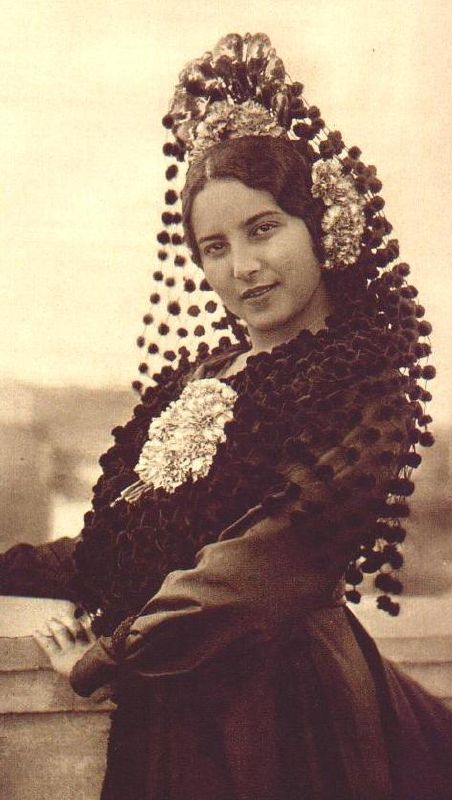
A manola with mantilla, 1925

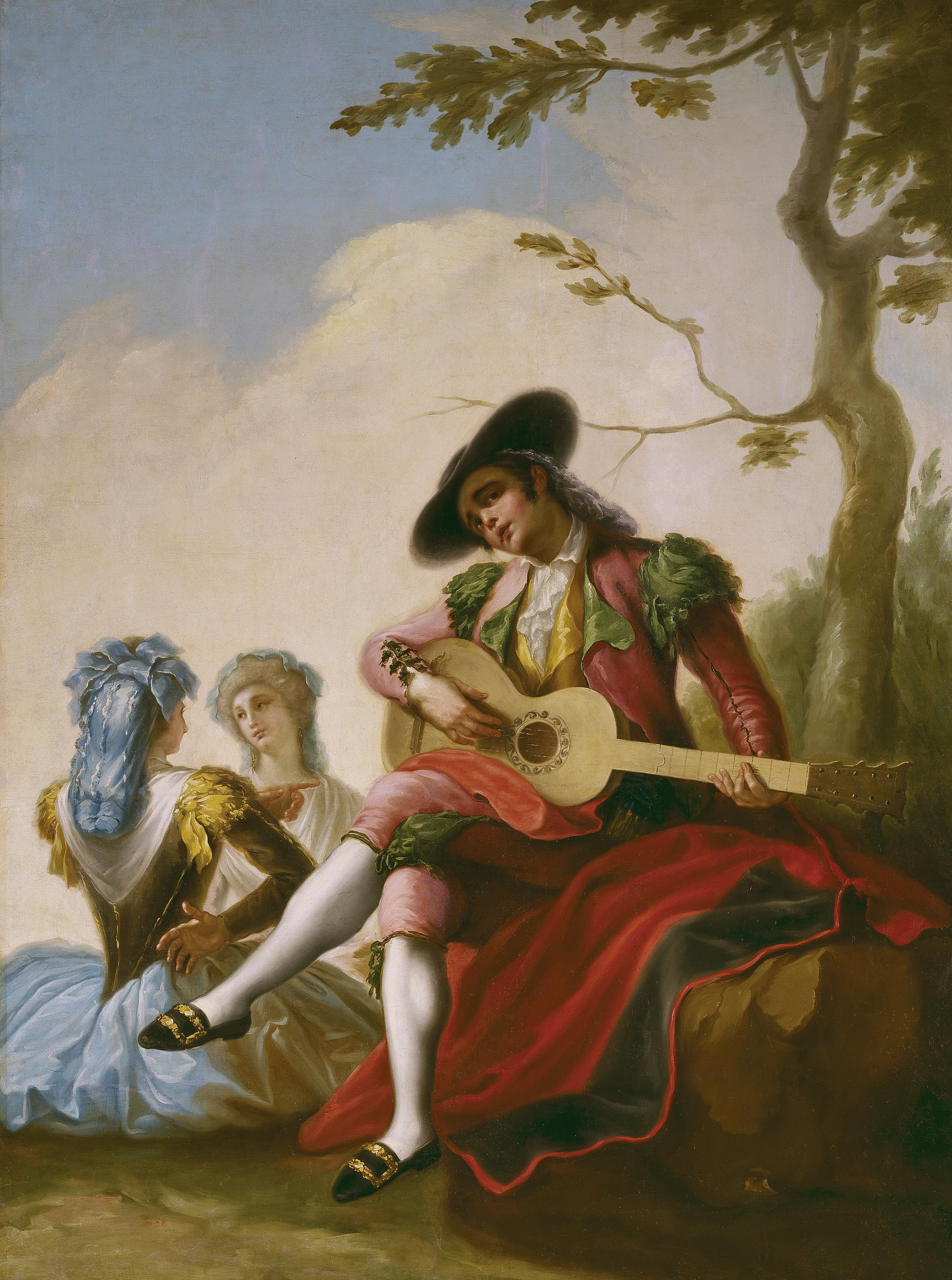
El majo de la guitarra, painting by Ramón Bayeu, 1786

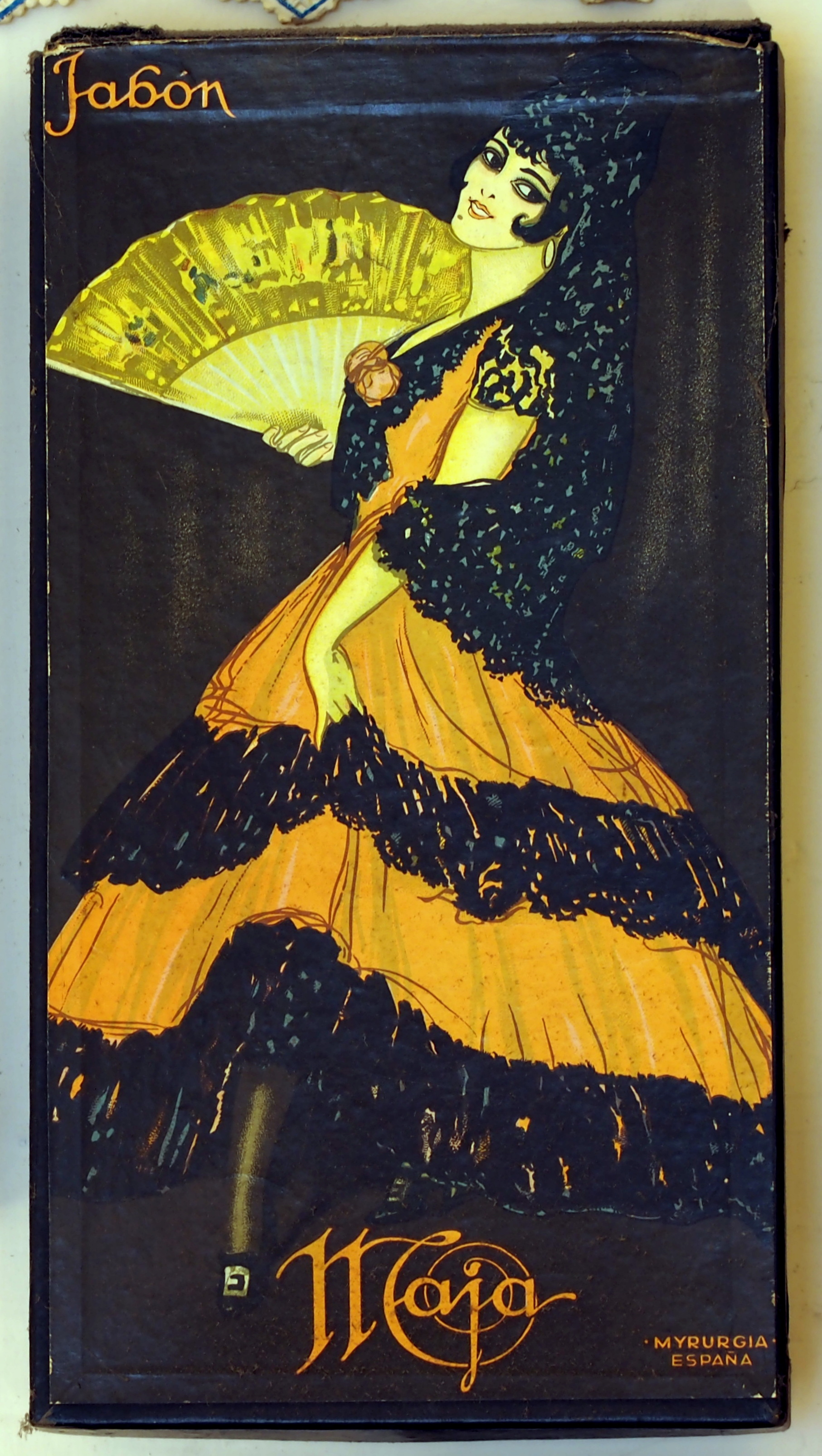
Maja Jabón, Myrurgia

== See also ==
- Guappo
- La Sape
- Apaches
- Cholo
- Chicano
- Machismo
