= List of compositions by Enrique Granados =

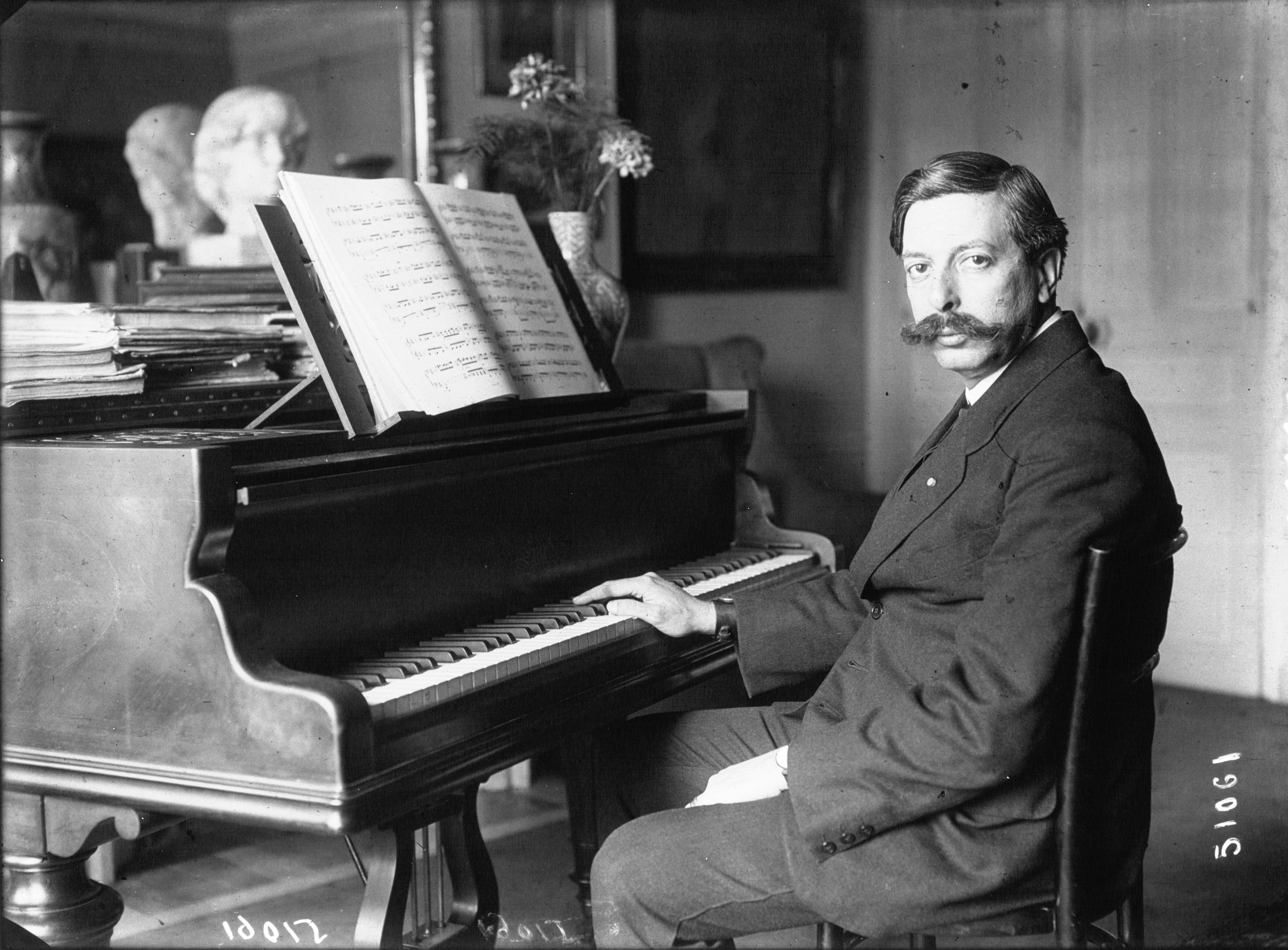
Enrique Granados in 1914.

This is an incomplete list of musical compositions and pedagogical writings by the Spanish composer and pianist Enrique Granados.

== Original works ==
=== Operas and theatrical works ===
- Miel de la Alcarria, incidental music in 3 acts, Op. 54 (1895)
- Ovillejos o La Gallina ciega, Sainete lírico in 2 acts (1897–98; incomplete)
- María del Carmen, opera in 3 acts (1898; incomplete)
- Blancaflor, incidental music in 1 act (1899)
- Petrarca, opera in 1 act (1899; incomplete)
- Picarol, drama líric in 1 act (1901)
- Follet, opera in 3 acts (1903)
- Gaziel, drama líric in 1 act (1906)
- Liliana, poema escénica in 1 act (1911)
- La Cieguecita de Betania, chamber opera in 1 act (1914)
- Goyescas, opera in 1 act (1915)
- Torrijos, incidental music

=== Orchestral ===
- Marcha de los Vencidos (1899)
- Suite sobre Cantos gallegos (1899)
- Dante, 2 Pieces for Orchestra, Op. 21 (1908)
- Elisenda, 4 Pieces (1912)
- Danza de los Ojos verdes
- Danza gitana
- "Intermezzo" from opera Goyescas
- "Navidad" from La Cieguecita de Betania
- La nit del mort (Poema desolación)
- Suite árabe u oriental

=== Chamber ===
- Canto, cello (1888)
- Piano Quintet in G minor, Op. 49 (1895)
- Piano Trio, Op. 50 (1895)
- Melodía, violin and piano (1903)
- Serenata, 2 violins and piano (1914; incomplete)
- Madrigal, cello and piano (1915)
- Escena religiosa, violin, organ, piano and timpani
- Intermedios para la Misa de Boda de Dionisio Conde, string quartet, harp, organ
- Pequeña Romanza, string quartet
- Romanza, violin and piano
- Violin Sonata
- 3 Preludios, violin and piano
- Trio, 2 violins and viola
- Trova, cello and piano

=== Piano ===
- Dans le Bois (1888)
- En la Aldea, 10 Pieces for Piano 4-hands (1888)
- París, Album with 37 Pieces (1888)
- Arabesca (1890)
- Canción moresca (1890)
- 12 Danzas españolas (1890)
- Mazurka alla polacca (1890)
- Serenata Amparo (1890)
- Serenata española (1890)
- La Sirena, Vals Mignone (1890)
- Los Soldados de cartón (1890)
- A mi queridísimo Isaac (1894)
- Balada (1895)
- 8 Valses poéticos (1895)
- Jota de Miel de la Alcarria (1897)
- Exquise...!, Vals tzigane (1900)
- Rapsodía aragonesa (1901)
- Allegro de concierto, Op. 46 (1904)
- Escenas románticas, 6 Pieces (1904)
- Goyescas, 7 Pieces (1911)
- Bocetos: Colección de Obras fáciles, 4 Pieces (1912; incomplete)
- Escenas poéticas, 7 Pieces (1912)
- 2 Impromptus (1912)
- Libro de Horas, 3 Pieces (1913; incomplete)
- A la Cubana, 2 Pieces, Op. 36 (1914)
- El Pelele (Escena goyesca) (1914)
- Valse de Concert, Op. 35 (1914)
- Danza lenta y Sardana, 2 Dances, Op. 37 (1915)
- Marche militaire, Op. 38 (1915)
- A la Antigua
- A la Pradera, Op. 35
- Allegro appassionato
- Andalucía
- Andantino espressivo
- Aparición, 15 Pieces
- Barcarola, Op. 45
- La Berceuse
- Canción arabe
- Canto del Pescador
- Capricho español, Op. 39
- Carezza, Op. 38
- Cartas de Amor, 4 Valses íntimos, Op. 44 (incomplete)
- Cheherazada, Fantasia for Piano, Op. 34 (1912; incomplete)
- Clotilde, Mazurka
- Crepúsculo
- Cuentos de la Juventud, 10 Pieces, Op. 1
- Danza característica
- Dolora en La menor
- Elvira, Mazurka
- Escenas infantiles, 5 Pieces, Op. 38 (bis)
- 7 Estudios
- 6 Estudios expresivos en Forma de Piezas fáciles
- La Góndola
- L'Himne dels Morts
- Impromptu, Op. 39 (1914)
- Intermezzo from opera Goyescas
- Jácara, Danza para cantar y bailar, Op. 14
- Jeunesse, Melodía
- Marcha real
- 2 Marchas militares, piano 4-hands
- Mazurka alla polacca, Op. 2
- Mazurka in A minor, Op. 20
- Melodía
- Melodía para el Abanico de Laura González
- Melodía para el Abanico de Lola González
- Minuetto
- Moresque y Canción arabe
- Oriental, Canción variada, Intermedio y Final
- Paisaje, Op. 35
- Países soñados (incomplete)
- Parranda-Murcia (incomplete)
- Pastoral
- 6 Piezas sobre cantos populares españoles
- Preludio in D major, Op. 30
- Reverie-Improvisation
- Serenata goyesca
- 10 Valses sentimentales

=== Voice and piano ===
- La Boibra (1902)
- Cançó d'amor (1902)
- L'Ocell profeta (1911)
- Elegía eterna (1914)
- 12 Tonadillas en estilo antiguo (1914)
- Canciones amatorias, 7 Songs (1914/15)
- Canción del Postillón (1916)
- Balada (incomplete)
- Canción (incomplete)
- Canco de Gener
- Canconeta Dorm Nineta, Op. 51
- Cantar I
- Canto gitano
- El Cavaller s'en va a la guerra
- Día y noche Diego ronda
- Mignon
- Por una Mirada, un Mundo
- El Rey y'l juglar (incomplete)
- Serenata
- Si al Retiro me llevas (Tonadilla)
- Yo no tengo quien me llore
- El majo timido

=== Choral ===
- Salve Regina (1896)
- Cant de les Estrelles (1911)
- L'Herba de Amor (1914)

== Arrangements and transcriptions ==
- Isaac Albéniz: "Triana" from Iberia, arr. 2 pianos
- J. S. Bach: Chorale, arr. chamber orchestra
- Bach: Fugue in C-sharp minor, arr. orchestra (1900)
- Chopin: Piano Concerto No. 2, re-orchestration of 1st movement (1900)
- Muzio Clementi: 4 Sonatinas, Op.36, arr. string trio (1891)
- Francesco Corselli: Sonata, arr. piano
- Domenico Scarlatti: 26 Sonatas, arr. piano
- Franz Schubert: Momento musical
- Jota aragonesa, arr. piano and orchestra (1904)

== Pedagogical works ==
- Breves Consideraciones sobre el Ligado
- Dificultades especiales del Piano
- Ejercicios de Terceras
- Método, teórico-práctico, para el Uso de los Pedales del Piano
- Ornamentos
- El Piano
- Reglas para el Uso de los Pedales del Piano (1913)

== Sources ==
- IMSLP: List of works by Enrique Granados
