= Bal du Moulin de la Galette (Casas) =

Oil on canvas painting by Ramon Casas

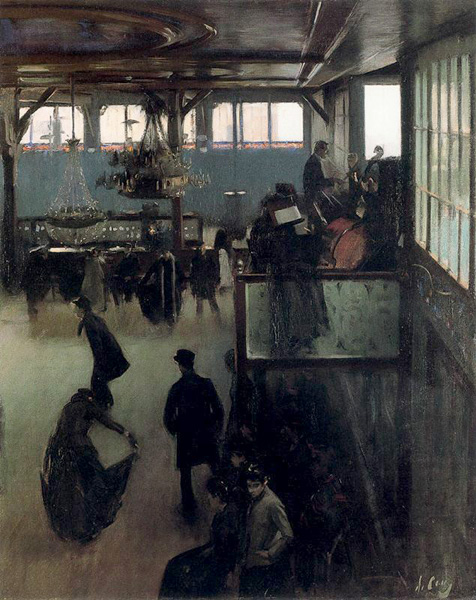
- Artist: Ramon Casas
- Year: 1890-1891
- Medium: Oil on canvas
- Dimensions: 100 cm × 81.5 cm (39 in × 32.1 in)
- Location: Cau Ferrat Museum; Sitges, Barcelona

Bal du Moulin de la Galette is an oil on canvas painting by Spanish painter Ramon Casas, created between 1890 and 1891. It is held at the Cau Ferrat Museum in Sitges, Barcelona.

== History and description ==
Casas was for the third time in Paris, in the winter of 1890, and had a joint exhibition with Santiago Rusiñol and Enric Clarasó, which lasted until 1892, and was very fruitful, for the quantity and quality of the work.

In 1900, Casas had an important solo exhibition in Paris, organized by Miquel Utrillo, director of the weekly Pel i Ploma and a personal friend, which brought together the best of the artist. The current painting had a prominent place in the exhibition.

Concerning the subject, it is interesting to note that unlike Pierre-Auguste Renoir and Henri de Toulouse-Lautrec, who captured this same environment in a bustling moment in 1876 and 1889, respectively, Casas opted to give a sad and sordid image of the place. Casas captured a wide panoramic view of the dimly lit room, with only two figures dancing and others in the foreground, in an indifferent attitude. Somehow, with a cold, monochromatic palette and a predominance of chiaroscuro, Casas opted for a pessimistic vision in this canvas, more in line with the works that his friend Rusiñol was doing at that time.
