= 12 Tonadillas en estilo antiguo =

12 Tonadillas en estilo antiguo, H. 136, is a collection of 12 songs by Spanish composer Enrique Granados with texts by Fernando Periquet. Together with Canciones amatorias they are considered to be the most important vocal works by Granados.

== Composition and publication history ==
The original title of the composition is Collección de tonadillas escritas en estilo antiguo. The songs were first published in 1912-1913 and 1915 by Casa Dotesio (its name being changed in 1913 to Unión musical Española). When the collection was finished, the order of the songs was rearranged. Hence, there are two numbering systems.

Orig.	Later	Title	Text incipit	Key	Tempo indication	Dedicatee	year	Notes
9	1	Amor y odio: Tonadilla	Pensé que yo sabría	G minor	Allegretto	Maria Barrientos	1913	
10	2	Callejeo: Tonadilla	Dos horas ha que callejeo	A major	Allegro risoluto	Maria Barrientos	1913	
2	3	El majo discreto: Tonadilla	Dicen que mi majo es feo	A major	Allegretto	–	1912	
12	4	El majo olvidado: Tonada o canción	Cuando recuerdes los días	F minor	Andantino	Emilio de Gogorza	1915	
4	5	El majo tímido: Tonadilla	Llega a mi reja	B♭ major	Allegro	–	1912	
8	6	El mirar de la maja: Tonadilla	¿Por qué es en mis ojos...?	A♭ minor	Allegro	Maria Barrientos	1913	Notated with no key signature
3	7	El tra-la-la y el punteado: Tonadilla	Es en balde, majo mio	A major	Allegro	–	1912	
1	8	La maja de Goya: Tonadilla	De Goya sabréis, sin duda – Yo no olvidaré en mi vida	A major	Allegretto comodo – Andantino quasi allegretto	–	1912	Consists of two parts: in the first a long text is spoken with piano accompaniment, the second is the song proper
5	9	La maja dolorosa: 3 Tonadillas: N. 1	¡Oh muerte cruel!	F minor	Andantino dramático	–	1912	With English horn ad libitum
6	10	La maja dolorosa: 3 Tonadillas: N. 2	¡Ay majo de mi vida!	A minor	Andantino con dolore	–	1912	
7	11	La maja dolorosa: 3 Tonadillas: N. 3	De aquel majo amante	B minor	Andantino	–	1912	
11	12	Las currutacas modestas: Tonadilla	Decid qué damiselas	A♭ major	Quasi andantino	–	1913	For 2 voices
