= Allegro de concert =

Allegro de concert or Concert Allegro may refer to:

- Allegro de concert (Chopin)
- Concert Allegro (Elgar)
- Allegro de concierto (Granados)
- Introduction and Concert Allegro (Schumann)
