= Twelve Spanish Dances =

Suite for piano by Enrique Granados

- by Enrique Granados
- Native name: Doce danzas españolas
- Duration: 55 minutes approx.
- Movements: 12
- Scoring: Piano

Twelve Spanish Dances (Spanish: Doce danzas españolas) is a suite for piano by Spanish composer Enrique Granados. One of Granados's best-known works, it was released in four volumes.

== Background ==
The official date of composition for the Twelve Spanish Dances is unclear, but best evidence points to a period between 1888 and 1890, during his tenure in Paris. The cycle was published in 1890 and premiered on April 20, 1890, at the Teatre Líric in Barcelona, by the composer himself. It was first published in a series of four volumes with three pieces each by J.B. Pujol & Cia. in 1892 in Barcelona. Pujol's publications were later bought out by Casa Dotesio, which was later consolidated and renamed Unión Musical Española. The set has since been reprinted and arranged for different instruments frequently. both nationally and internationally. Some dances were published separately throughout the years by different publishers.

The pieces from the first two volumes were dedicated to people in his social circle. The first piece, Galante, was dedicated "a la Srta. Doña Amparo Gal," his wife. Oriental was dedicated "a Don Julián Martí," and Fandango was dedicated "a Joaquin Vancells," whose identity is not known. Villanesca was dedicated "a T. Tasso," the father of one of his students. Andaluza was dedicated "a Alfredo G[arcía] Faria," and Rondalla Aragonesa was dedicated "a D. Murillo." From then on, Granados dedicated entire volumes to different people. Volume III was a "Hommage à César Cui," whereas Volume IV was dedicated "a S. A. R. la infanta Dª Isabel de Borbón."

=== Catalogue and opus numbering ===
The piece has been wrongly assigned different numbers, chiefly due to title similarity across Granados's oeuvre for piano. The composer never published an official opus list and pieces were mostly published without opus numbers during his lifetime. Retrospectively, however, as many of his compositions were republished after both the composer and the original publishers and rights holders had died, Twelve Spanish Dances has been assigned opus numbers in an attempt to better identify pieces that could be easily confused. The cycle has been published as Op. 5 because of a misunderstanding surrounding the name of one of the dances, Andaluza, which is the fifth dance in the set. It has also been commonly released by publishers and record labels alike as Op. 37. However, Op. 37 also refers to a two-dance set entitled Spanish Dances (Spanish: Danzas españolas), featuring different dances altogether. Some other publishers have also assigned Op. 31 to Twelve Spanish Dances.

== Structure ==
The Twelve Spanish Dances are a cycle of twelve pieces for solo piano which have been arranged for many other instruments due to the uncomplicated directness in the presentation of folk themes and melodic appeal. The total duration of a complete performance of the cycle is around 55 minutes, even though the pieces are rarely presented and performed as a set and are usually played as extracts. Even though titles for each piece are sometimes provided, most editions do not include them. The cycle structure is as follows:

Structure of Granados's Twelve Spanish Dances
Volume I
Piece No.	Title	Key	Tempo marking	Bars
I	Galante (Minueto)	G major	Allegro - Andante - Allegro - Andante - Allegro - Poco andante - Tempo I - Andante - Allegro - Andante - Allegro	86
II	Oriental	C minor	Andante - Lento assai - Andante	113
III	Fandango (Zarabanda)	D major	Energico - Allegro maestoso	166
Volume II
IV	Villanesca	G major	Allegretto, alla pastorale - Andante espressivo - Molto andante - Andante espressivo	174
V	Andaluza	E minor	Andantino, quasi allegretto - Andante - Tempo I	96
VI	Rondalla aragonesa (Jota)	D major	Allegretto, poco a poco accelerando - Vivace - Andante - Molto andante, espressivo - Tempo I - Vivace	168
Volume III
VII	Valenciana (Calesera)	G major	Allegro airoso - Poco più moto - Tempo I - Andante	182
VIII	Sardana (Asturiana)	C major	Assai moderato - Meno - Allegro molto	139
IX	Romántica (Mazurka)	B-flat major	Molto allegro brillante - Vivo	228
Volume IV
X	Melancólica (Danza triste)	G major	Allegretto - Cantabile e rubato - Andante - Tempo I	106
XI	Arabesca (Zambra)	G minor	Largo a piacer - Andante con moto - Largamente - Come primo	113
XII	Bolero	A minor	Andante - Molto andante espressivo - Andante	119

The dances are melodically, rhythmically and structurally direct and simple, as they are meant to reflect key features of Spanish folk music. The themes presented in each dance are entirely original and not based on actual folk material. All pieces are in ternary form, which transitions and codas being very brief or non-existent. Its harmonic language is largely diatonic, and chromaticism is only present for embellishing melodies lightly. Nine out of the twelve dances are in 3/4 meter, as triple meter is highly characteristic of Spanish folk music.

== Recordings ==
Among the very few recordings that have survived of Granados's own playing are the late recordings of Valenciana and Danza triste. The composer recorded these two pieces decades after they were published and merely a few years from his death aboard the SS Sussex. The recording was taken in 1912, at Odeon Studios, in Barcelona, Spain.

== Reception ==
Granados sent copies of the published edition of his Danzas to other composers in Europe, including Camille Saint-Saëns, Jules Massenet, Edvard Grieg, and César Cui, all of whom praised the cycle. Cui stated that he thought they were "charming both in melody and harmonization", and excelled in their "Individual originality". Felip Pedrell thought highly of the Danzas, Massenet named Granados "the Spanish Grieg", and Alfonso Albéniz, Isaac Albéniz's son, claimed his father always kept a copy of the cycle on his piano. Its popularity was immediate and lasting, as many conductors and composers arranged them for various instruments and ensembles. Musicians like Joan Lamote de Grignon and Rafael Ferrer orchestrated it.

On a more nuanced note, some critics have argued that theme reiteration can be seen both as a weakness and a strength. Critic Georges Jean-Aubry said that the Dances "are not quite free from the defect which is apparent in many of Granados’s works: the too numerous repetitions of a theme. But in those which are strongly marked with emotion and melancholy, it is this very repetition, plain, unsophisticated, that increases tenfold the emotional effect," whereas Bryce Morrison stated: "By endlessly varied repetition he conveys an obsessive and static insistence on the intrinsic beauty of his conception. The tireless exploration of sonorities and ornaments derives from the simplest possible material, and a constant and intensifying process occurs that is entirely different from the dynamic structure of a classical sonata."
