= Cau Ferrat Museum =

Spanish museum in home of artist Santiago Rusiñol

Coordinates: 41°14′6.24″N 1°48′45.85″E

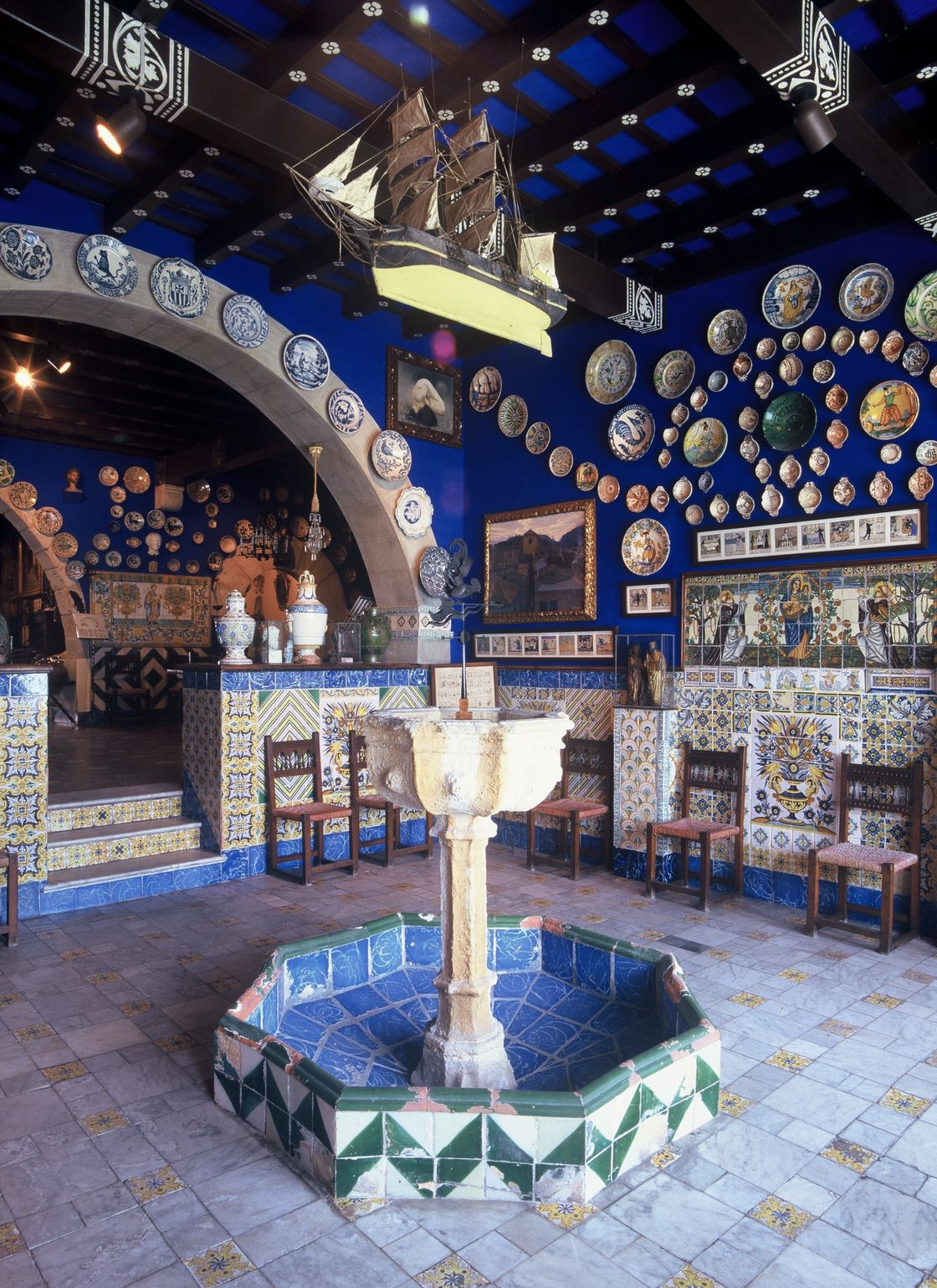
Sala Brollador

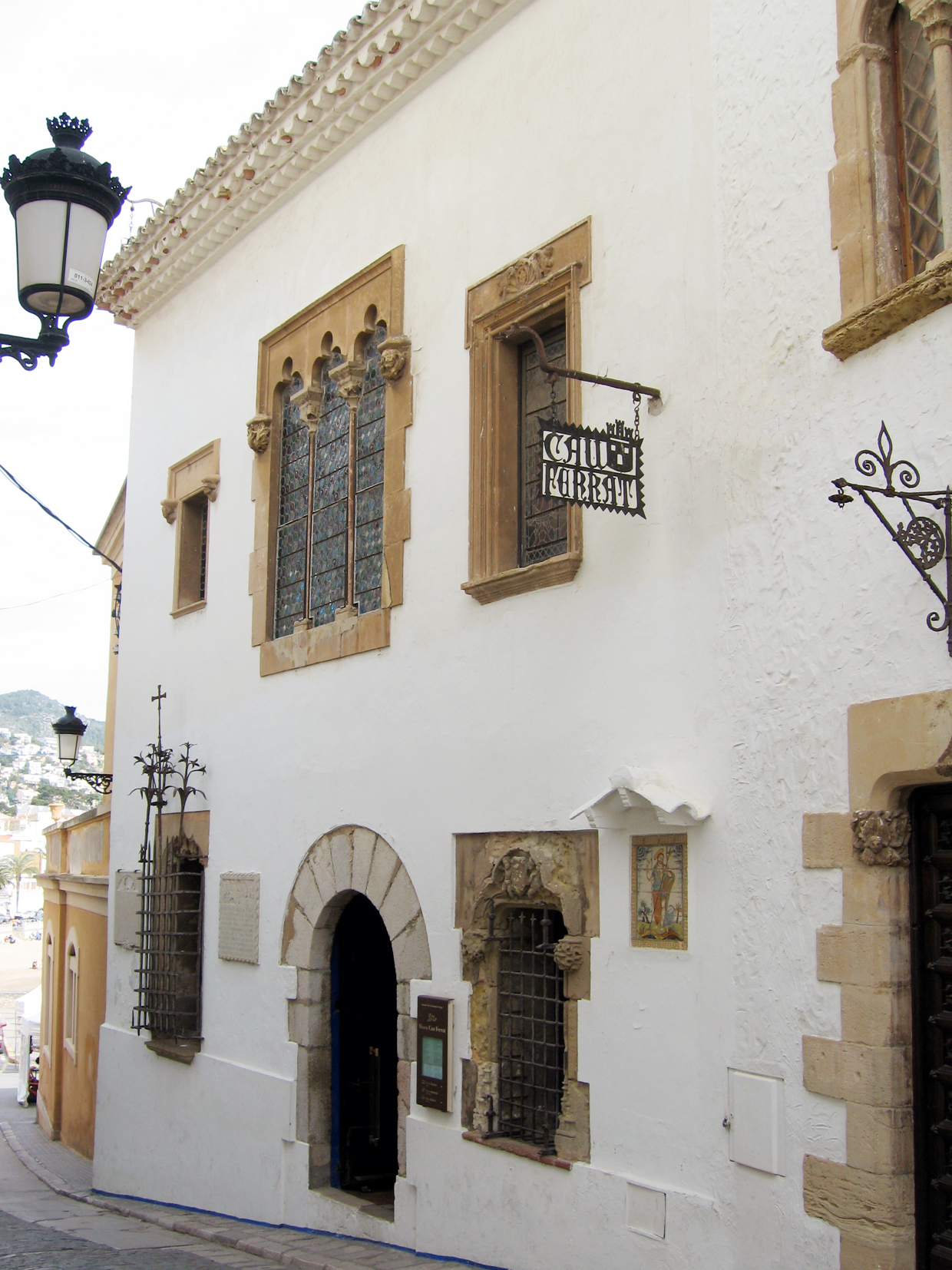
Façade of Cau Ferrat

Cau Ferrat, located in Sitges, was the home and study of artist and writer Santiago Rusiñol, one of the most important figures of the Modernisme movement in Catalonia. It is one of the three museums in Sitges located on the shores of Sant Sebastià beach.

== History ==
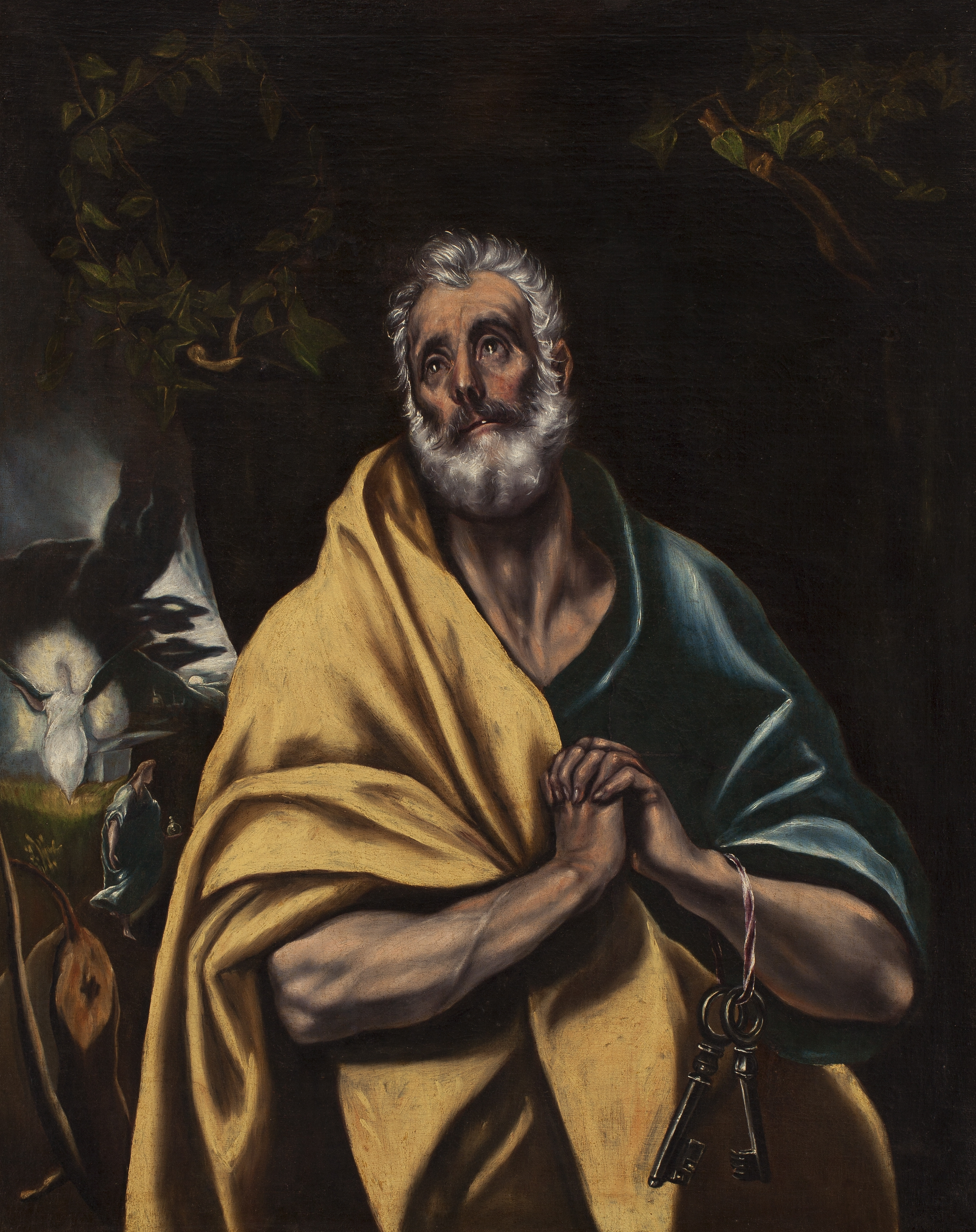
El Greco. The Tears of Saint Peter, c-1595-1614

Born into a bourgeois Catalan industrial family from Manlleu, Santiago Rusiñol i Prats (Barcelona, 1861 – Aranjuez, 1931) was asked by his paternal grandfather and godfather, Jaume Rusiñol, to continue the family tradition and become a cotton manufacturer. Instead, the young Rusiñol chose to enter the Catalan and Spanish art scene. A painter, narrator, collector, dramatist, amateur archaeologist, journalist and key figure of the Modernista movement, Santiago Rusiñol conceived of art as a priesthood and of the artist as the chosen one who, due to an ineluctable calling, is predestined to the sacrifice of living his ideal to the ultimate consequences.

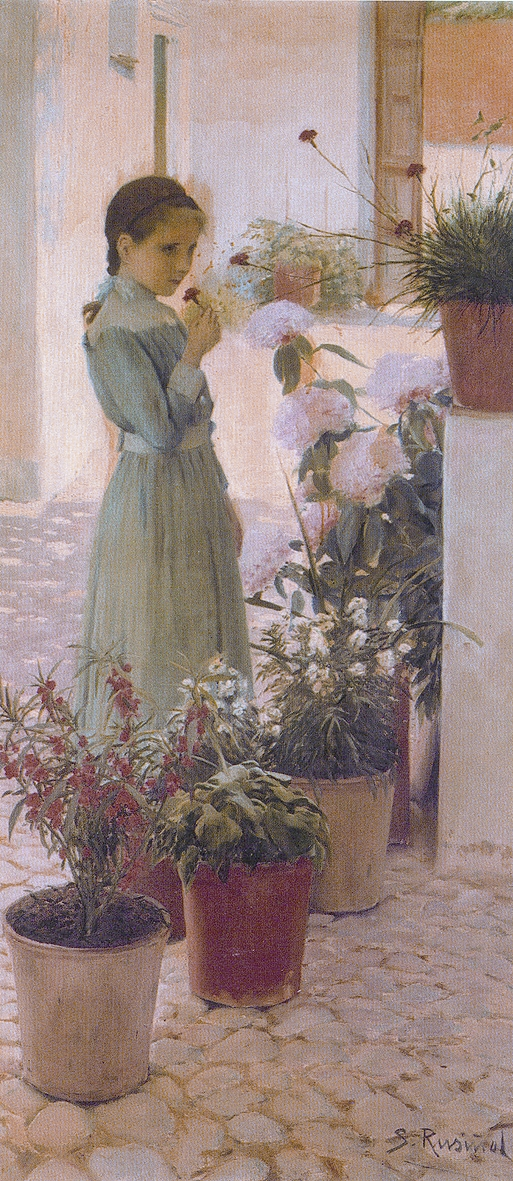
Santiago Rusiñol. The Girl with Carnation, 1893

It was from Sitges that Rusiñol spread his theory of Total Art, of art as a new religion. the celebration of the Festes Modernistes (1892–1899), the building of the Cau Ferrat (1893–1894) and the inauguration of the monument to El Greco (1898) made Sitges the Mecca of Modernisme and Rusiñol the high priest of his new movement that aspired to transform society through culture. Thanks to this, Rusiñol was able to build up his own personal mythos.

Rusiñol arrived in Sitges in October 1891 and stayed there until January 1892. In the months that followed he went back frequently (that same year, he organised what would later be known as the first Festa Modernista), until in the spring of 1893 he decided to buy a little fisherman's house next to the sea in the Sant Joan district. The last owner of the house, who had died decades before, had left it in her will to Our Lord God with the intention that the income from the house should be used for saying mass for her soul and those of her predecessors. In view of this unusual situation, an application had to be made to the Ecclesiastical Court of the Diocese of Barcelona for authorisation of the sale, which was finally completed on 30 July 1893.

Rusiñol paid 1000 pesetas for the house and another 2000 to have it knocked down so a new one could be built to serve as a home and studio. The plan was commissioned from the architect Francesc Rogent, who incorporated in the façade the large Gothic windows from Sitges's old castle, recently demolished to make way for the new Town Hall. Rusiñol's home and studio, inaugurated a few months later, inherited the name of Cau Ferrat from the studio in Barcelona the artist had shared until then with his friend Enric Clarasó. Rusiñol soon realized that there was not enough room, however, and in May 1894 he bought the house next door to complete the building of the Cau Ferrat as it exists today.

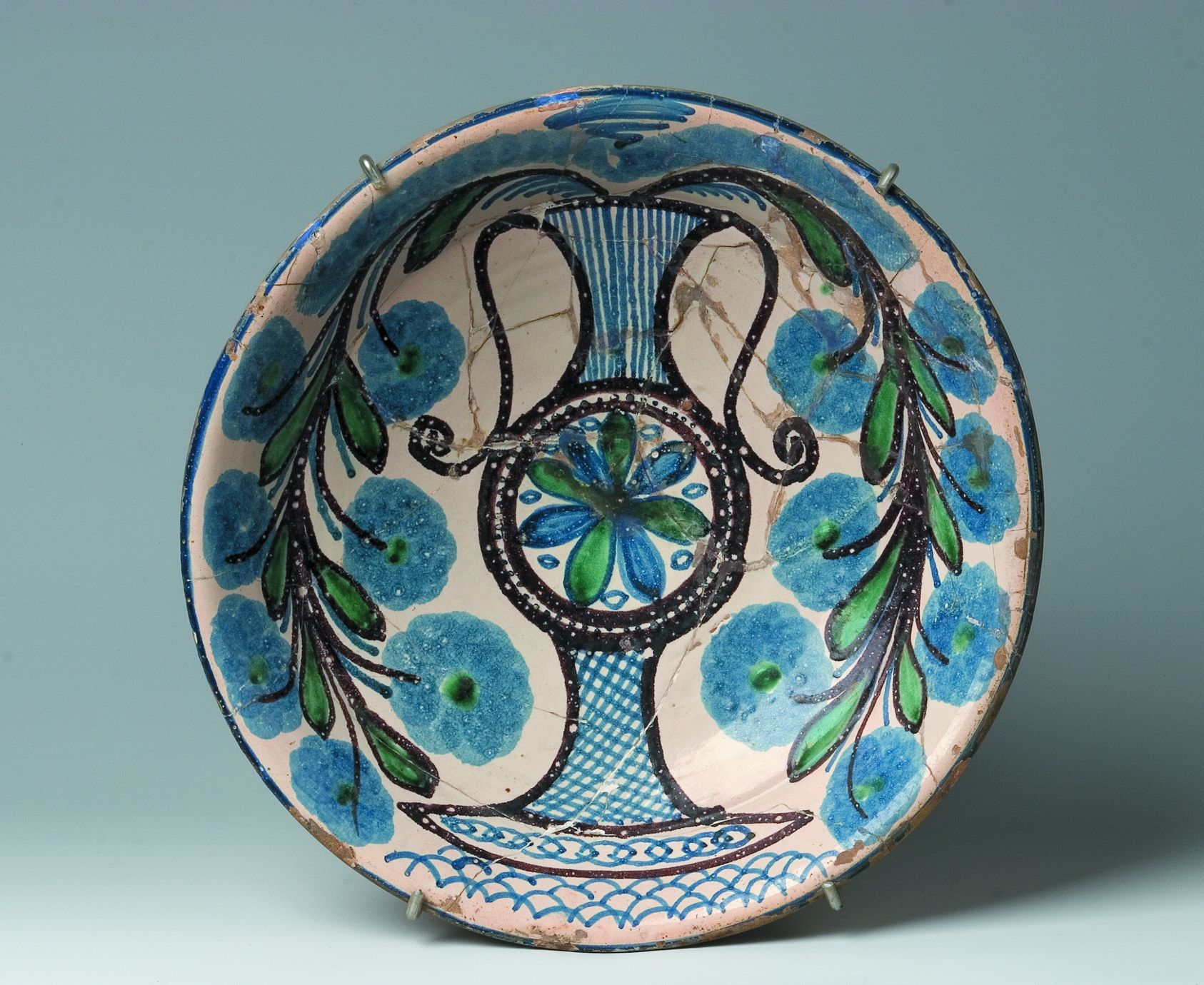
Plate. Muel, 19th century

The following September he moved his collection of wrought iron there from Barcelona, and on 4 November, in the course of the third Festa Modernista, there was another inauguration which was a much bigger and more splendid affair than the first as the artist timed it to coincide with the arrival of two pictures by El Greco he had bought a few months earlier in Paris.

Although he spent long periods there between 1894 and 1899, Rusiñol’s ultimate intention was not to live comfortably there so much as to create a personal collection of art. That was how the Cau Ferrat became one of the favourite gathering-places for the bohemians of the end of the century. The list of well-known figures of the time who set foot in the rooms of the Cau includes Joan Maragall, Emilia Pardo Bazán, the Belgian musicians Eugène Ysaÿe and Ernest Chausson, Àngel Guimerà, Benito Pérez Galdós, Víctor Balaguer, Ángel Ganivet, Enrique Granados, Narcís Oller, and Manuel de Falla.

On his death, Rusiñol left the building of the Cau Ferrat and all the collections it contained to the town of Sitges, with the condition that it be made a public museum, which was inaugurated on 16 April 1933. Rusiñol’s decision to leave the Cau to the people of Sitges closed the circle begun that far-off night of 5 January 1892, when the artist said in the Fonda Subur that he wanted to take with him in his pictures a souvenir of what he had seen here.

In each of the items to be seen in the Cau Ferrat there is a bit of Santiago Rusiñol’s life and art. Including them all is an almost impossible undertaking and something that exceeds the aims of this visitor’s guide, whose purpose is just to give an overall view of the man and bring him within reach of those people entering the Cau Ferrat for the first time and thinking it might be just an ordinary museum.

== Collections ==
=== Paintings and drawings ===
The Cau Ferrat's collection of paintings and drawings, along with ironwork, is the largest in terms of the number of items. It contains those works by Rusiñol that the artist chose to hold onto all his life and for which he felt a special affection. Furthermore, many of the leading artists of Catalonia of the late nineteenth and early twentieth centuries are represented: Ramon Casas, Pablo Picasso, Arcadi Mas i Fondevila, Isidre Nonell, Hermenegildo Anglada Camarasa, Ramon Pichot, etc. Some were friends of Rusiñol. The paintings and drawings in the Cau reflect its owner’s tastes as well as the artistic trends in vogue at that time: impressionism, modernism, symbolism, etc.

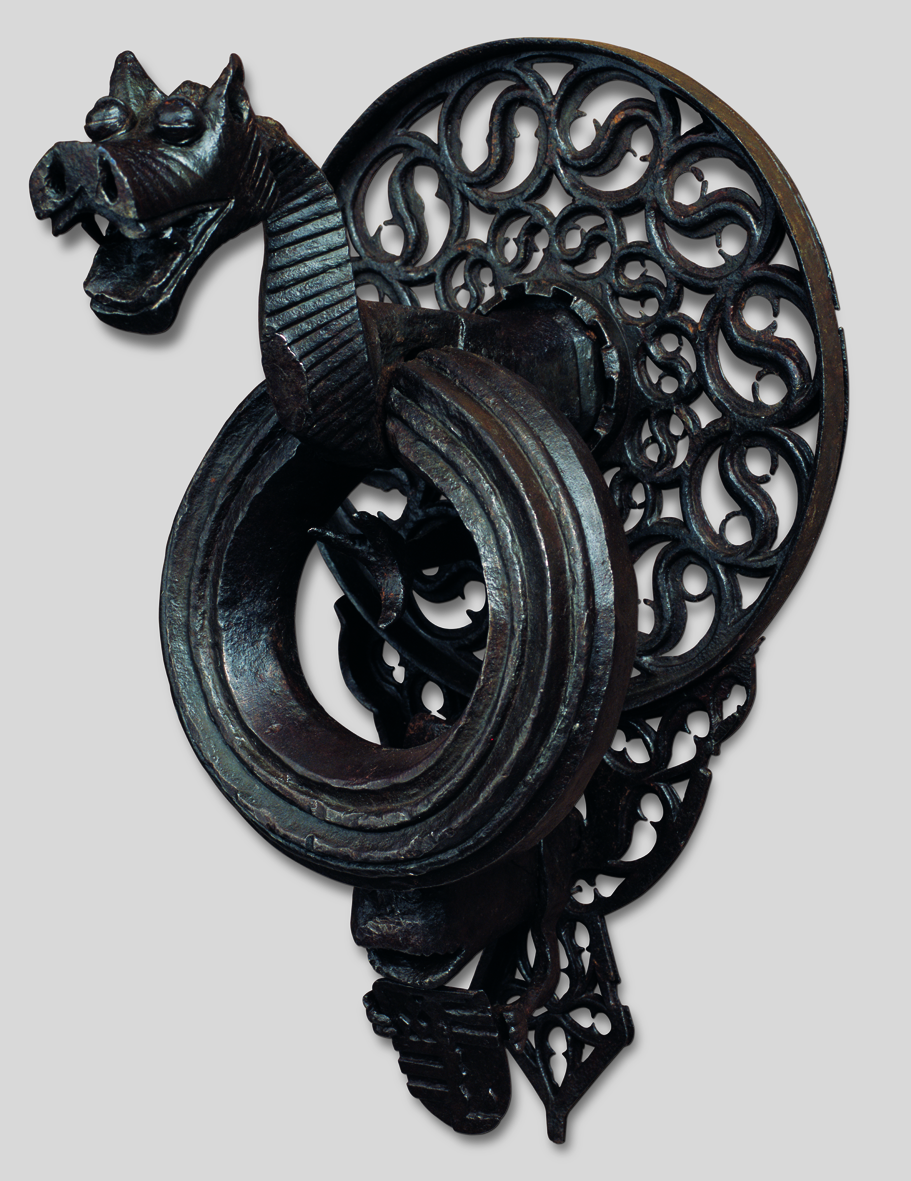
Door-knocker from the Casa de l'Ardiaca (Barcelona), c 1490-1510

Most of the works are by the artist himself. The tour of the collection follows the order of the rooms: Entrance Hall, Kitchen/Dining-Room, Sala del Brollador (Fountain room), Office, Living-Room and Recess, Staircase and Great Hall.

=== Ironwork ===
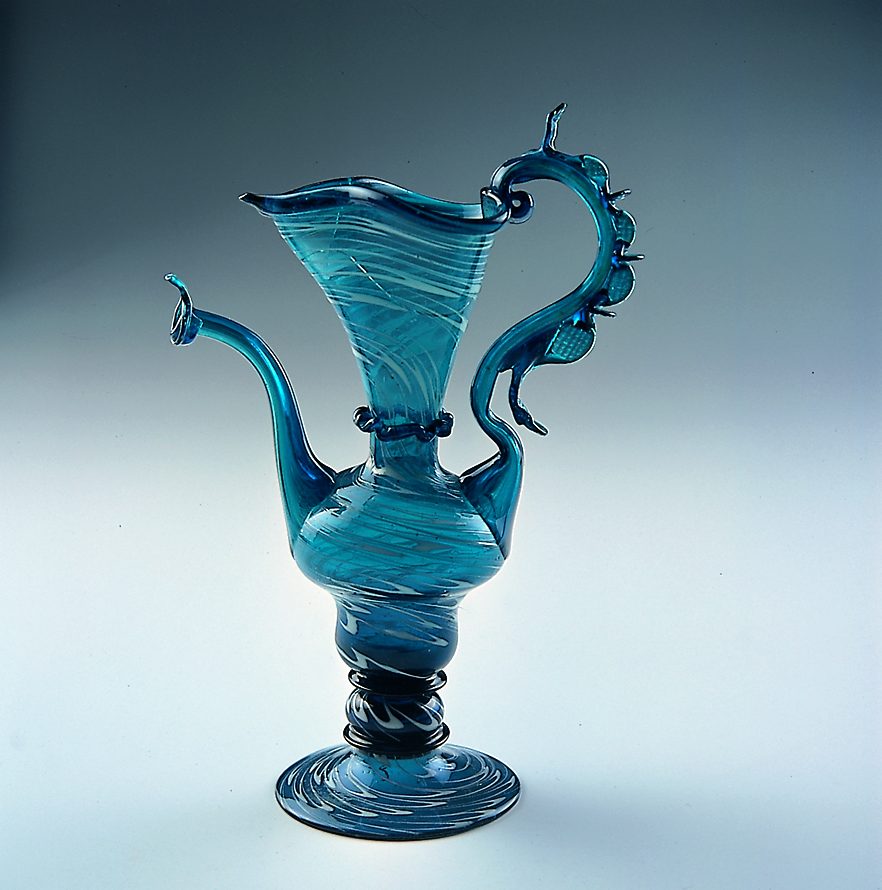
Small jug. Venice, end of 17th century-beginning of 18th century

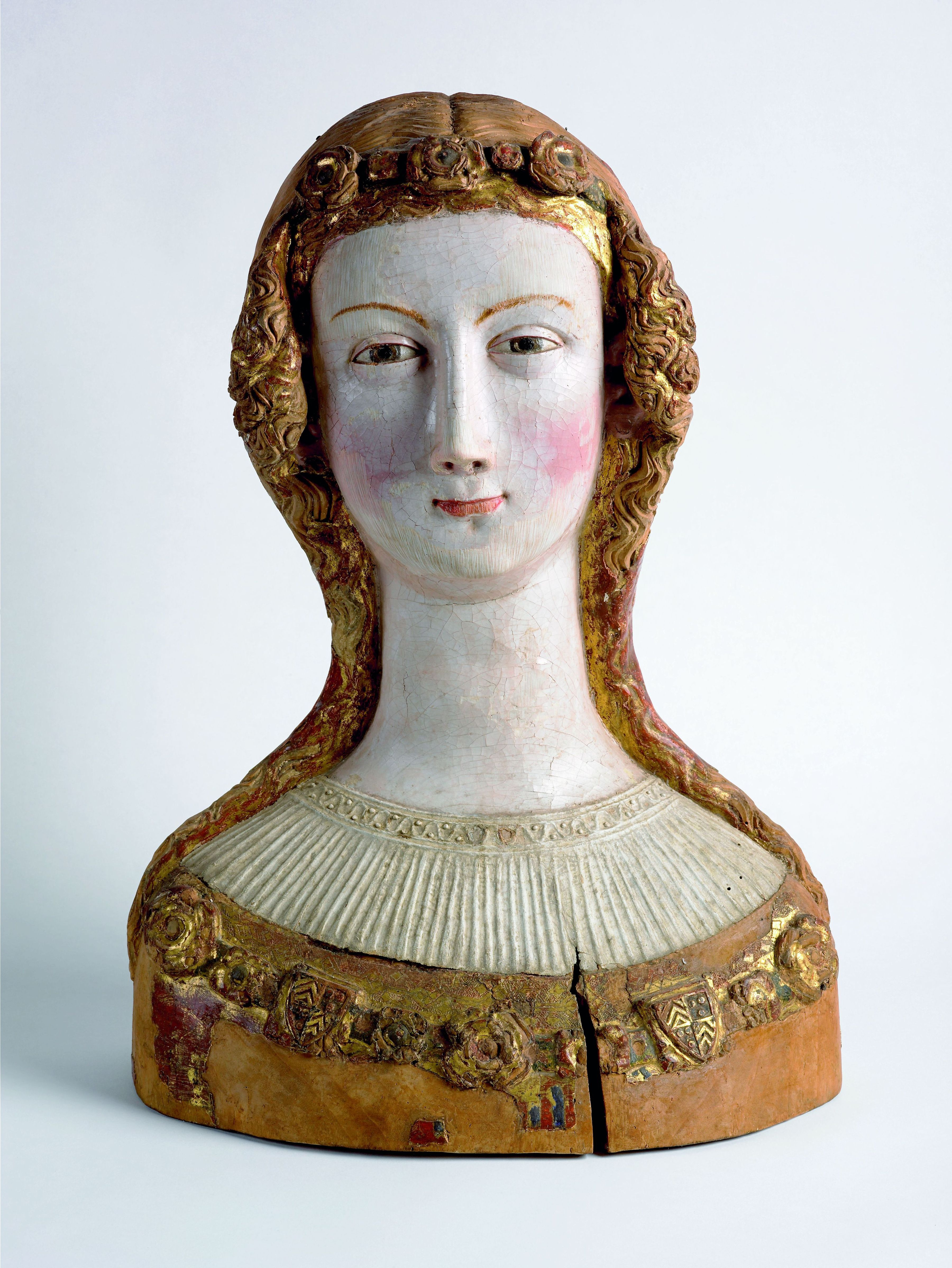
Lady of the Cau Ferrat. Catalan-Valencian work, first half of 15th century

Rusiñol’s reputation as a collector of ironwork preceded his fame as a painter and his popularity as a dramatist. Thanks to Rusiñol and a small group of antique ironwork collectors (amongst them several of friends of his who shared his obsession), the art of wrought iron was no longer seen as the expression of a lesser creative activity and became a subject for study. At the same time, it underwent an important revaluation which, like in many other arts and crafts, showed itself especially in Modernista architecture (e.g. the buildings designed by Gaudí, Puig i Cadafalch or Domènech i Montaner).

=== Glassware ===
Unlike the collection of ironwork, part of which already decorated the walls of the studio-workshop in Barcelona that Santiago Rusiñol shared with Enric Clarasó, the collection of glass arrived in Sitges after the Cau Ferrat was built. It does not make up a uniform whole so much as two large collections with a total of almost 400 items acquired by Rusiñol at two different moments in his life. In the Great Hall is found the collection of glass from modern times, while the Sala del Brollador is the setting for the archaeological or antique glass. The different origin of the items and the wide time-scale they cover mean that a lot of the different techniques used in working this material in the course of history are present.

=== Furniture and sculpture ===
On entering the Cau Ferrat for the first time, the visitor sees the large number of items the museum houses and the horror vacui that presides over the whole building, for which reason many items are only glanced at or even go unnoticed. Amongst the items that are most often missed are the furniture and sculptures, which are often considered simple decorative complements of no intrinsic value.

=== Ceramics ===
In the course of his life, Santiago Rusiñol put together a considerable collection of ceramics which today is concentrated mainly in two of the rooms on the ground floor of the Cau Ferrat, the Kitchen/Dining-room and the Sala del Brollador. Here the visitor will find a varied selection of more than 200 items ranging from the fourteenth century to the nineteenth century, mainly plates and dishes, but also bowls, pharmaceutical jars, washbasins, fruit-stands, pitchers, soup tureens and various tiled panels.

These items come from very varied origins. Catalan potteries account for about a quarter of the collection, although the main pottery-making centres of Valencia, Aragon, Castile, Andalusia and Murcia are also represented. The collection is completed with a few items from Majorca, Italy and Florence.

== See also ==
- Maricel Museum
- Can Llopis Romanticism Museum
- Santiago Rusiñol
