= Santiago Rusiñol =

Spanish painter, poet, journalist, collector and playwright

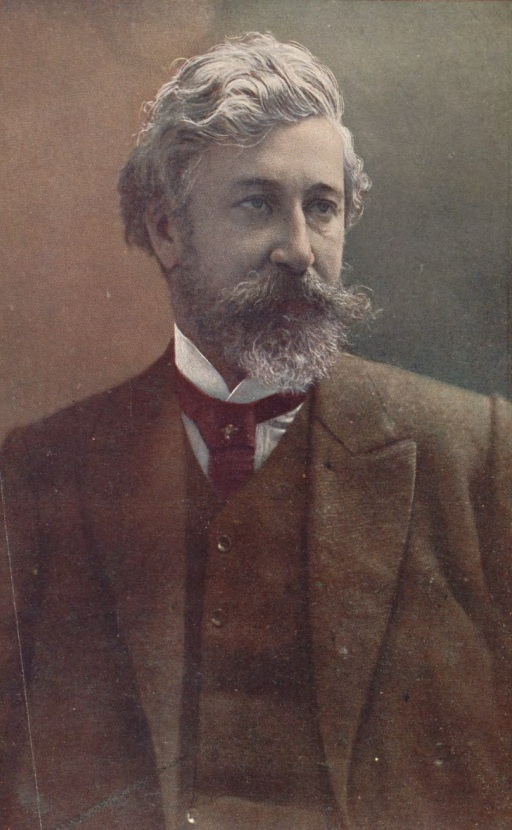
- Rusiñol in 1906
- Born: 25 February 1861; Barcelona, Spain
- Died: 13 June 1931 (aged 70); Aranjuez, Spain
- Education: Studio of Tomás Moragas
- Known for: Painting, Poetry, Theater
- Movement: Modernisme
- Spouse: Lluïsa Denís

Santiago Rusiñol i Prats (Catalan: [səntiˈaɣu ruziˈɲɔl], Spanish: [sanˈtjaɣo rusiˈɲol]; Barcelona 25 February 1861 – Aranjuez 13 June 1931) was a Spanish painter, poet, journalist, collector and playwright. He was one of the leaders of the Catalan modernisme movement. He created more than a thousand paintings and wrote numerous works in Spanish and Catalan.

== Life and friends ==
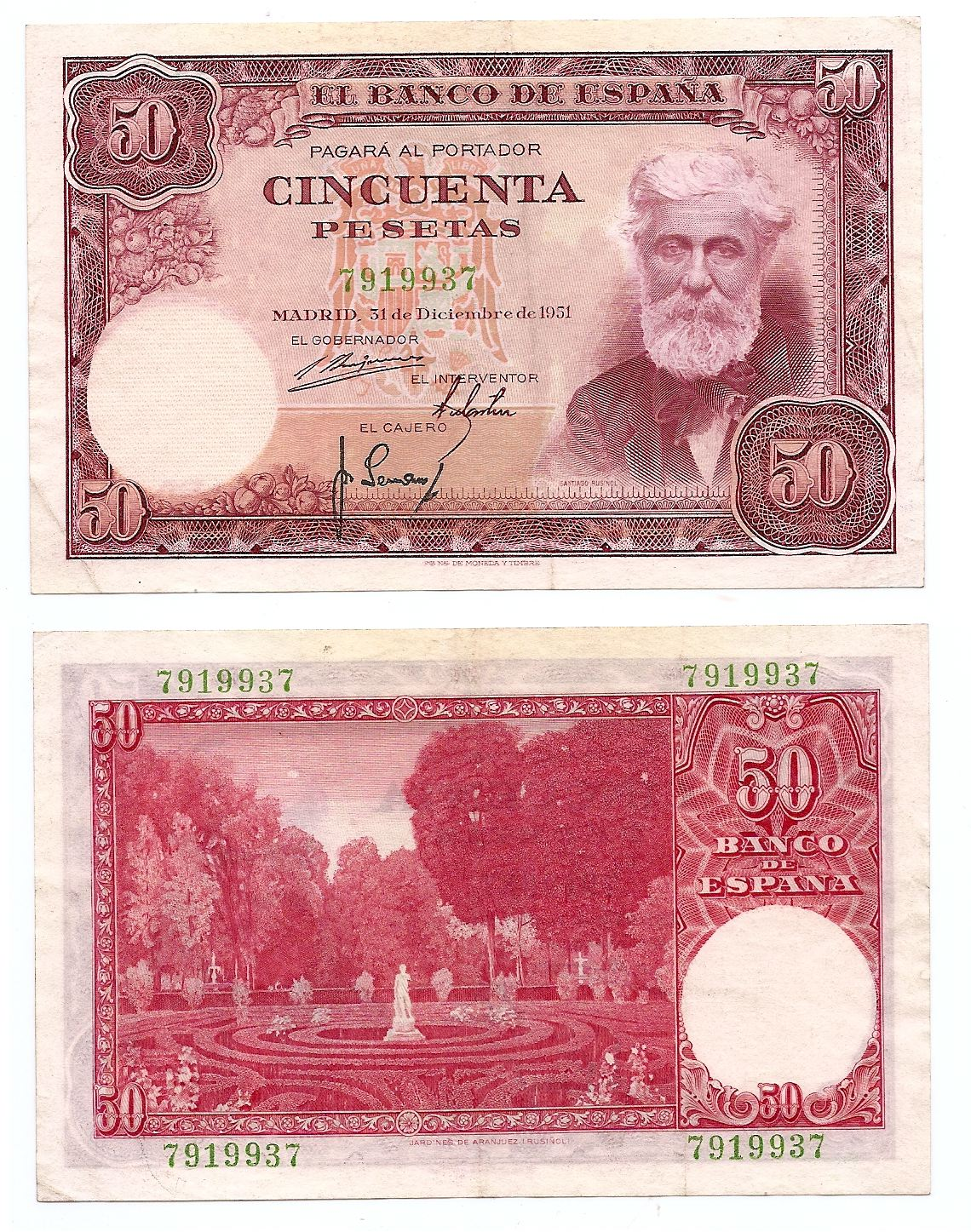
1951 Spanish 50 peseta banknote, showing Rusiñol

Rusiñol was born in Barcelona in 1861 into a textile industrialist family from Manlleu, where they owned the textile mill town known as Can Ramissa. Santiago Rusiñol appears in the civil registry with the given names of Jaume Jacint Lluís, rather than Santiago. Despite being the inheritor of the family business, he developed in his adolescence an interest in art which would go on to be his life's work.

On 19 June 1886, he married Lluïsa Denís Reverter. The following year, his daughter, Maria Agustina, was born. A few months later, however, his restless nature, lack of interest in the family business, and desire to paint and travel led him to hand over the company's management to his brother Albert, a businessman and politician. After handing over the management of the company, Santiago devoted himself to travelling extensively through Catalonia, Spain, France, and Italy, making travel a constant throughout his life. Travel would go on to be a constant in his life.

In 1888, he established himself as a writer, regularly contributing to the newspaper La Vanguardia. In 1889 he broke off ties with his family, a rupture that lasted ten years, although he kept in touch with his daughter. That same year he went to study in Paris, where he lived on and off for the next decade.

In 1893, he set up his studio in Sitges, which today stands as the Cau Ferrat. Sitges became a modernist reference point for artists, writers and musicians, including Rusiñol, and modernist festivals, combining theatre, poetry, painting and music were organized there. He continued to write, chiefly narrative works and poems in prose. Some of his novels were adapted and performed in the theatre, such as L'auca del senyor Esteve, written in 1907 and released a few years later. In the first decade of the twentieth century, he consolidated his prestige as a prolific painter and writer, both in Barcelona and throughout Spain and Paris. In 1899, due to a severe illness, he was reunited with his wife. When he recovered, he returned to France with his family to detoxify from morphine addiction. He became an official member of the Paris Salon in 1908.

He was also part of the famous social gatherings at the Els Quatre Gats café on Carrer de Montsió in Barcelona and run by ca:Pere Romeu i Borràs. It was a place of social gathering and an alternative art room, and frequented by a young Pablo Picasso. He maintained close friendships with the painter Ramon Casas and the sculptor Enric Clarasó until his death.

In the following two decades, his prestige grew in Barcelona despite disagreements with Noucentista artists and critics of the time (notably with the art critic Eugeni d'Ors, who wrote in the newspaper La Veu de Catalunya). In 1917, he was awarded the Legion of Honour by the French government.

He died in Aranjuez in 1931. Manuel Azaña, president of the Spanish Republic's provisional government, ordered an official funeral in Madrid. Rusiñol was later buried in Barcelona.

== Pictorial artwork ==
Rusiñol studied at the studio of the painter Tomàs Moragas, where he learned drawing and various techniques, such as oil and watercolor. He first showed his work at the Sala Parés, in Barcelona, in 1879, in a collective exhibition; he would work with this gallery throughout his life. He also painting landscapes, figures, and literary scenes as opposed to the historical themes which at the time were fashionable.

His work often depicted depicting natural scenes of Catalan landscapes. He also painted scenes related to work and of the urban landscape, displaying characters in natural attitudes or engaged in their daily tasks. His work was generally well-received by critics of the time.

In 1888, he had his first solo exhibition in the Parés Gallery, published articles in the newspaper La Vanguardia, exhibited for the first time at the Paris Salon, and participated in the Barcelona World's Fair.

== Gallery ==
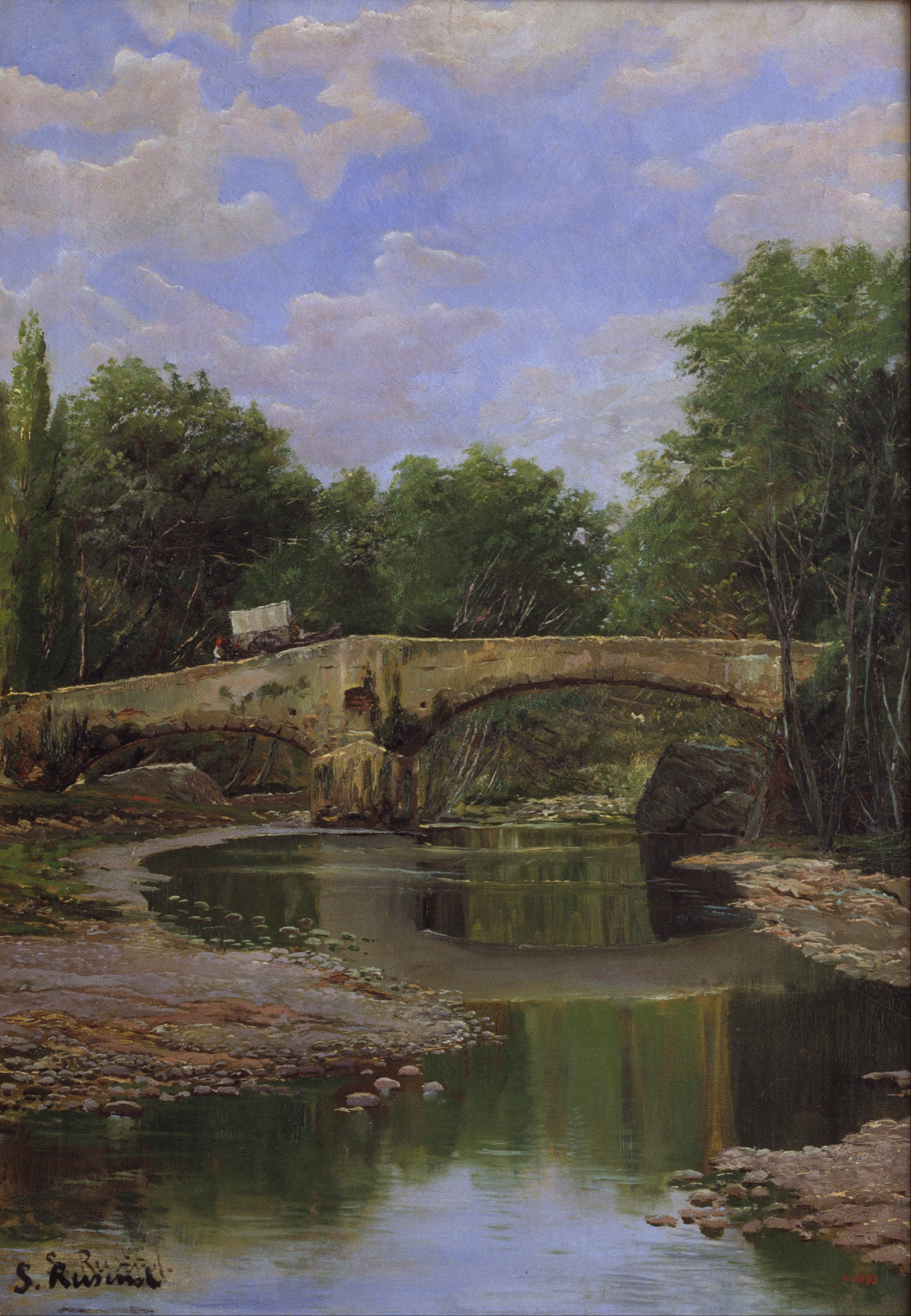
Bridge over a River, c. 1884

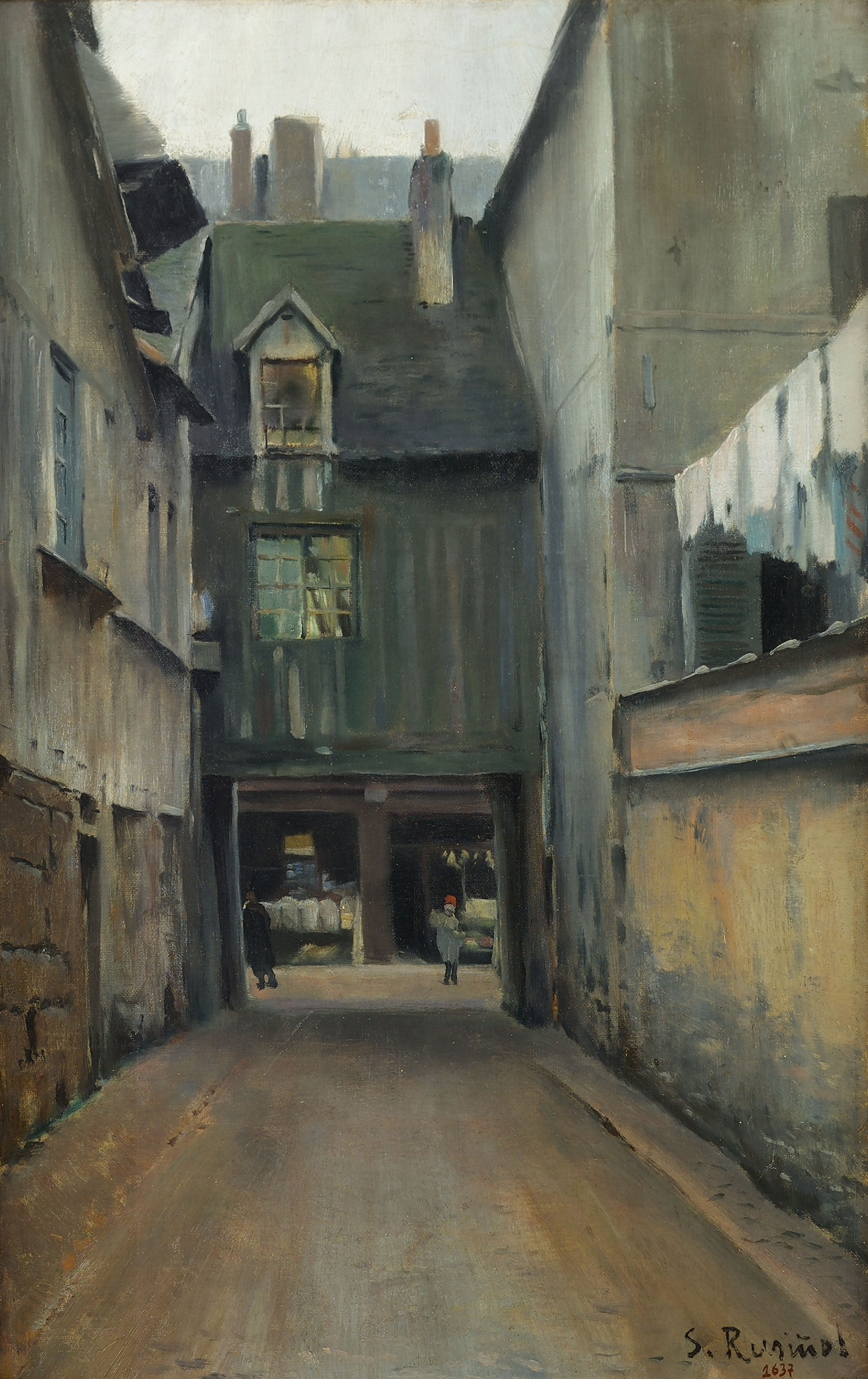
Street in Rouen

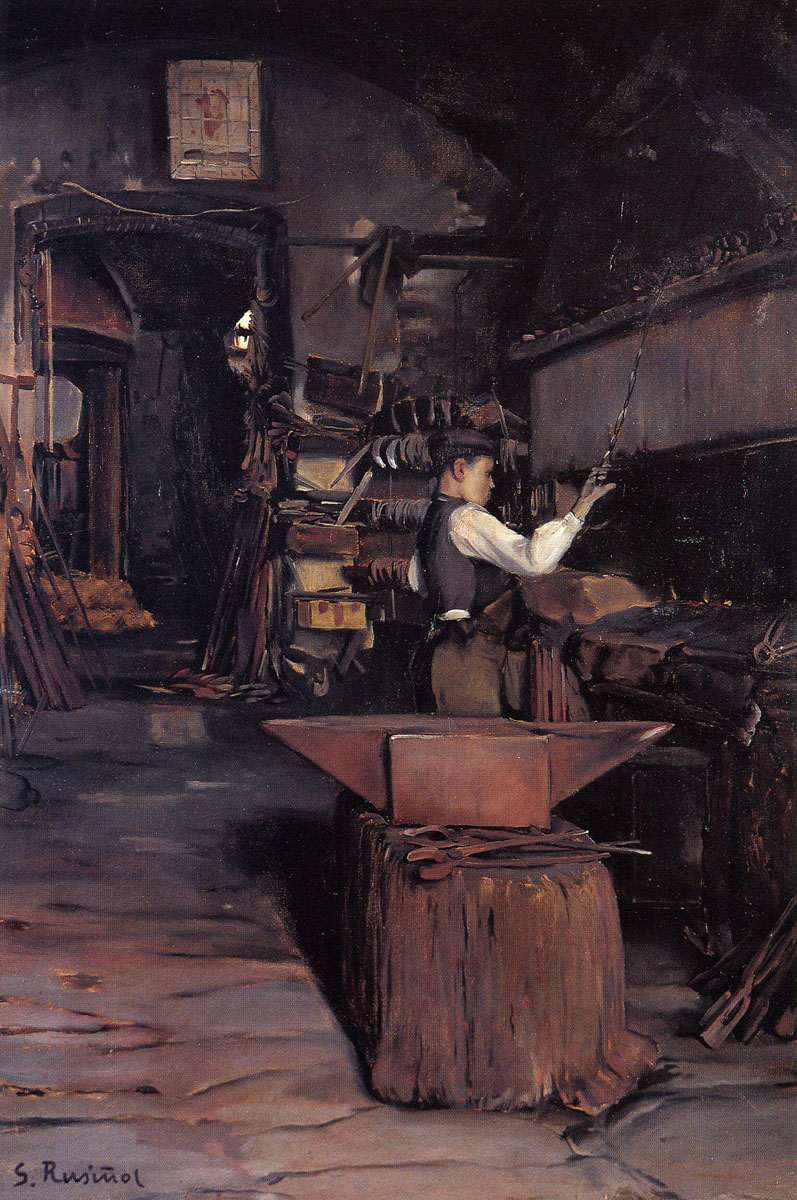
Blacksmith, 1889

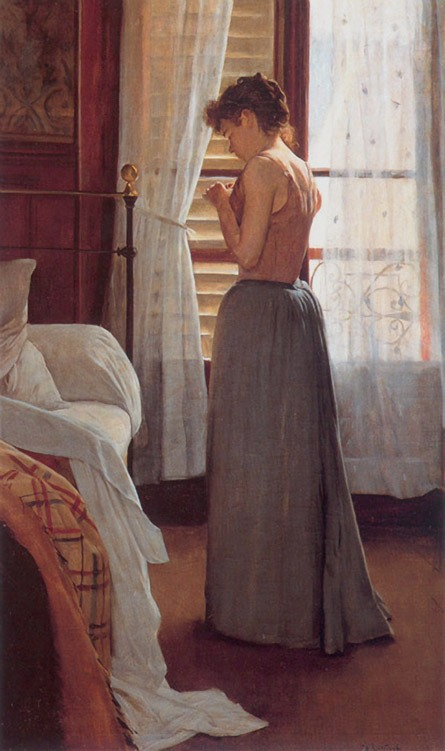
Figure Study, 1890s

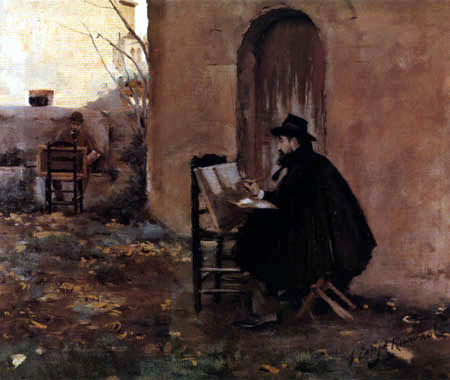
Santiago Rusiñol and Ramon Casas painting each other, 1890

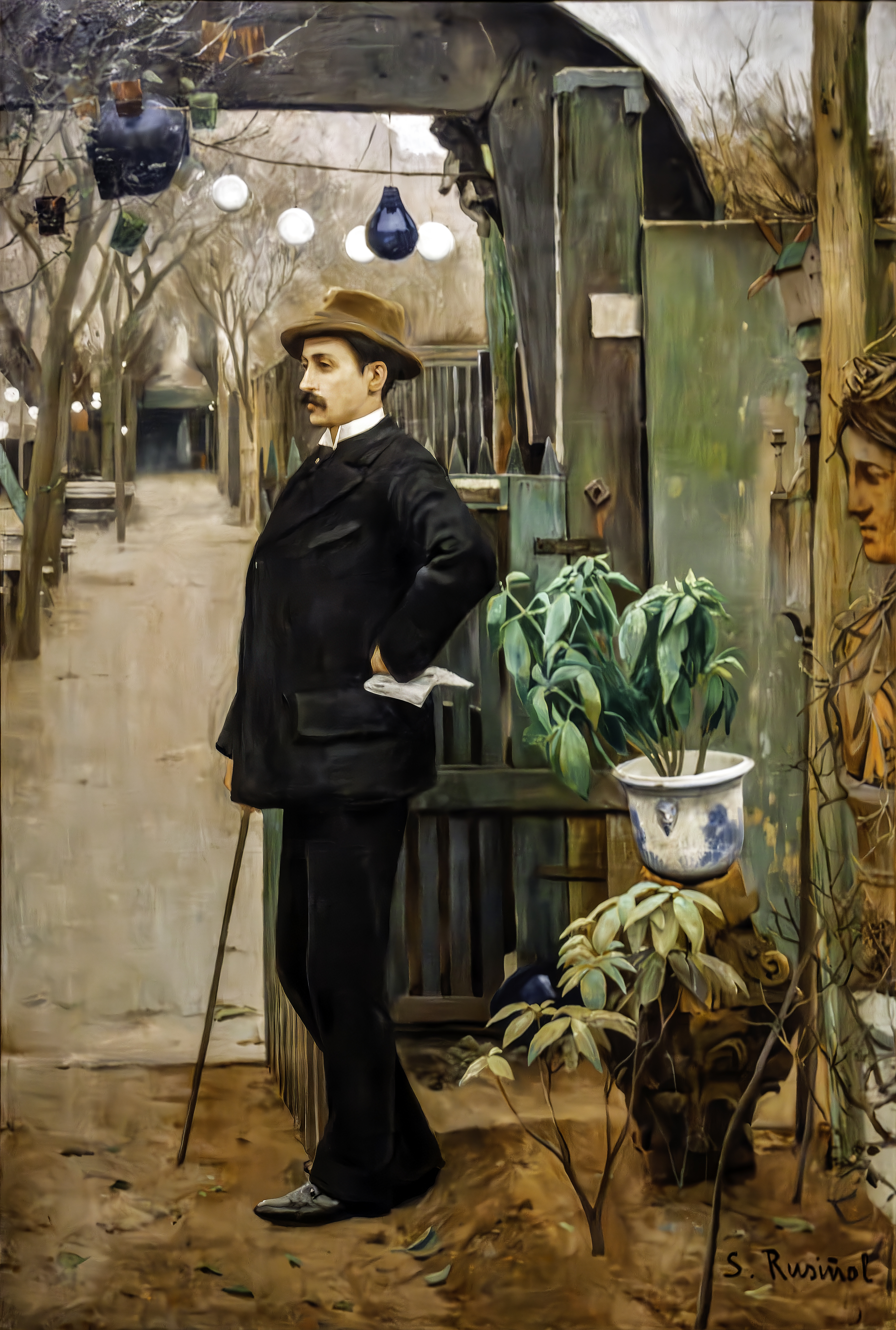
Portrait of Miquel Utrillo, c. 1890-1891

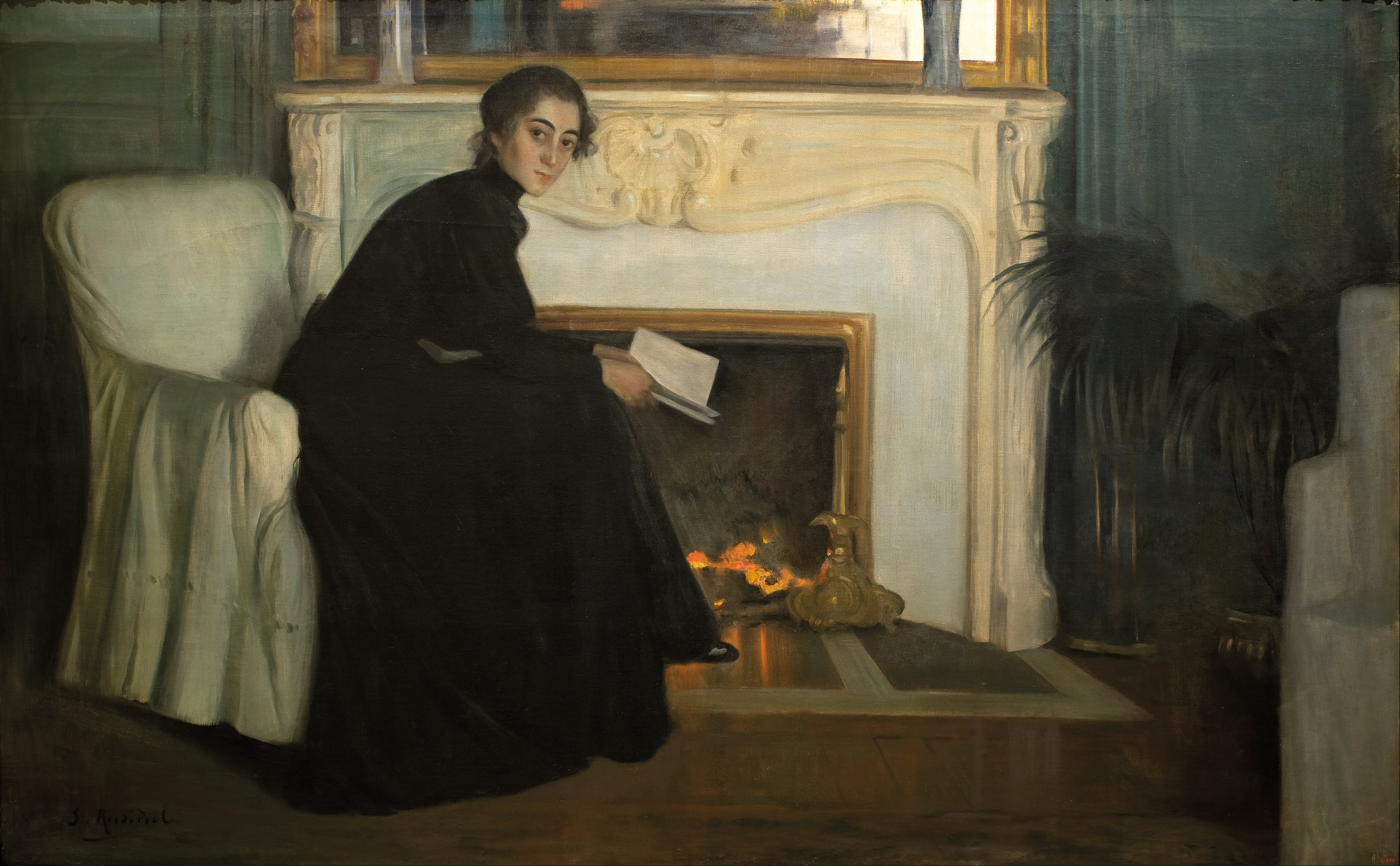
Romantic Novel, 1894

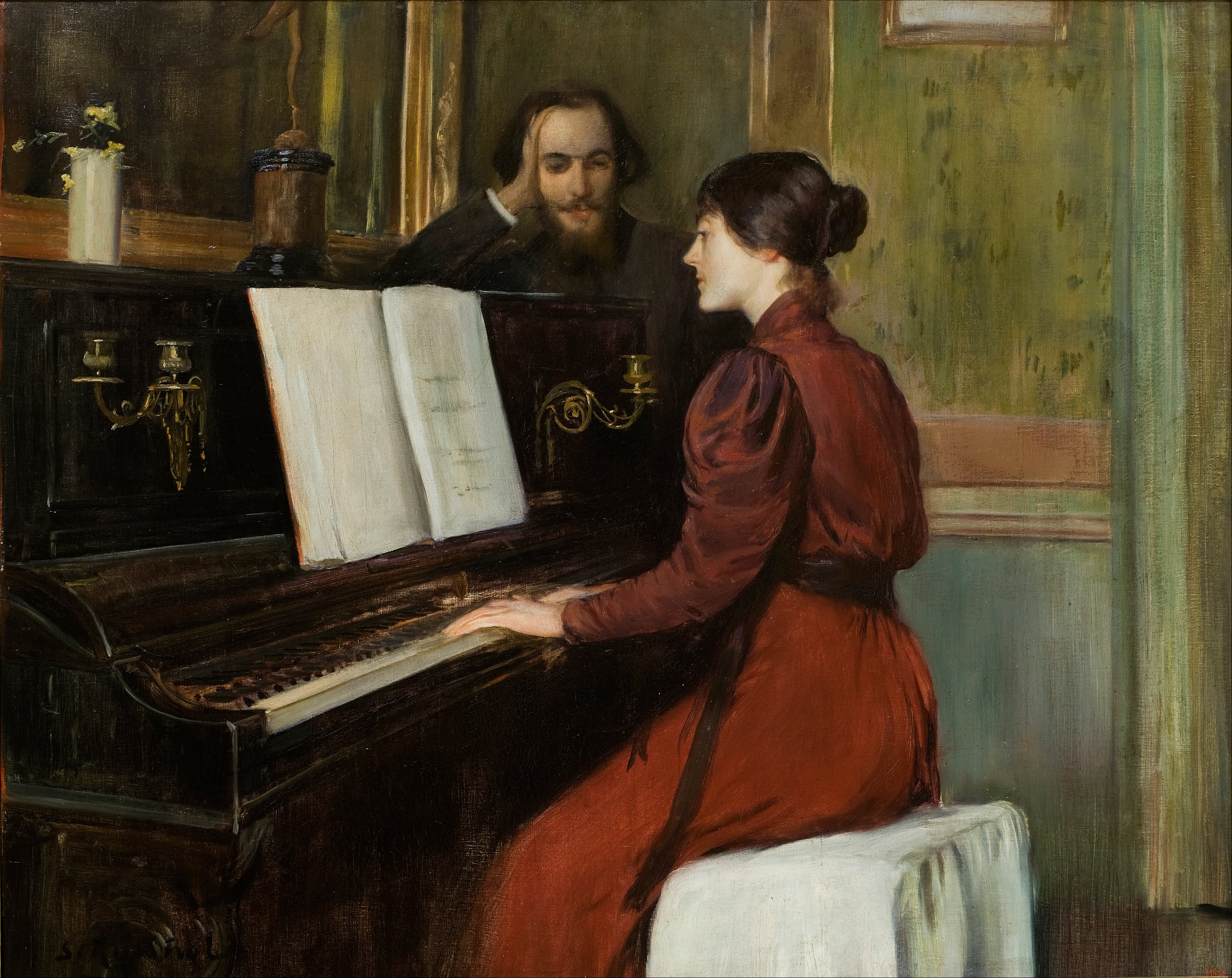
A Romance, 1894 (depicting Erik Satie and Stéphanie Nantas)

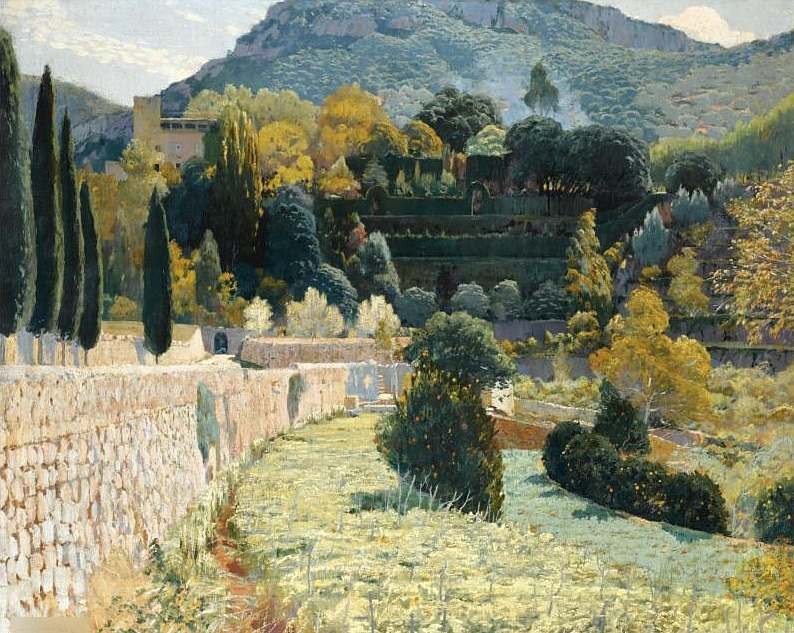
Terraced Garden in Mallorca (1904)

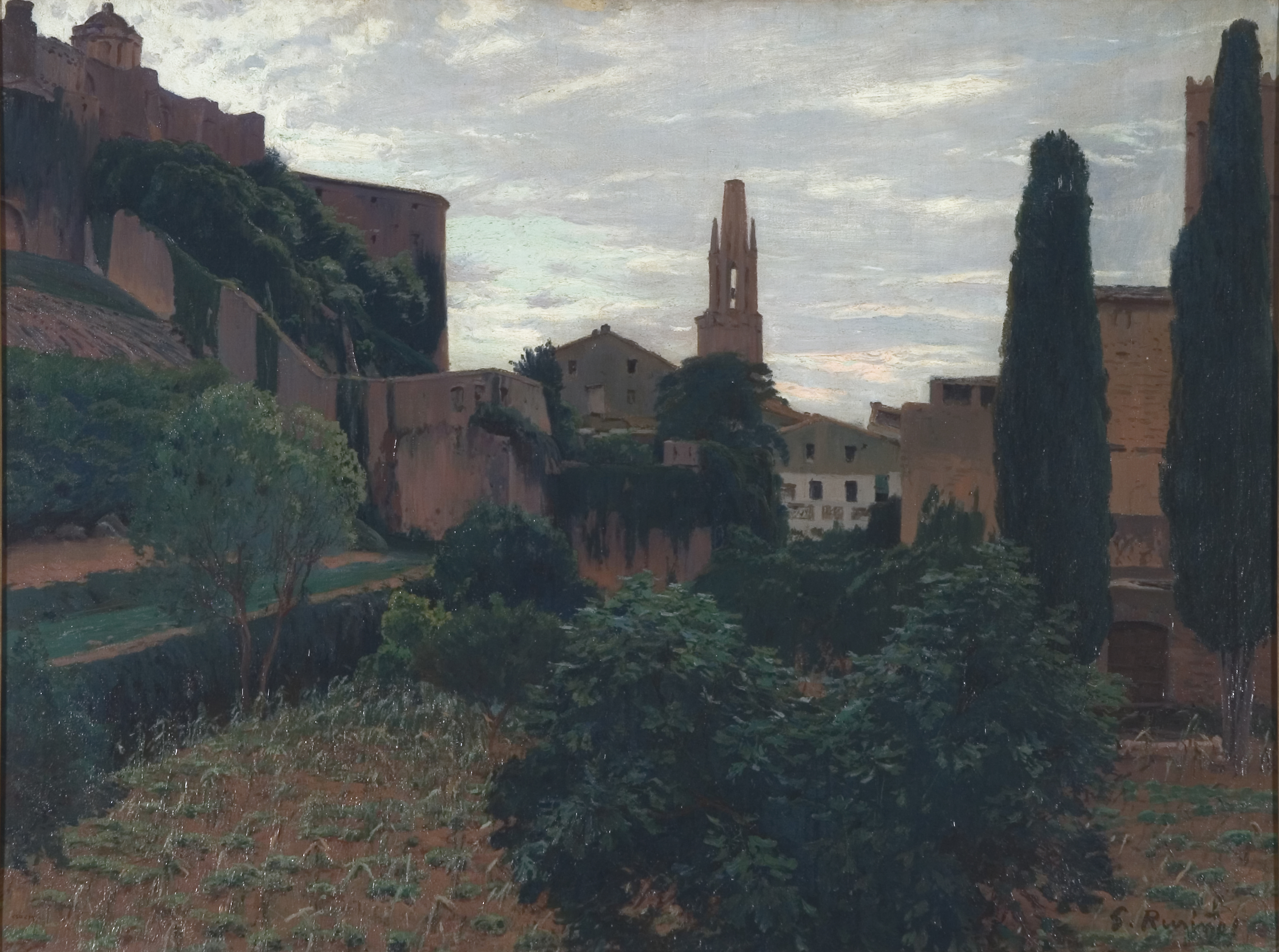
Girona, 1909

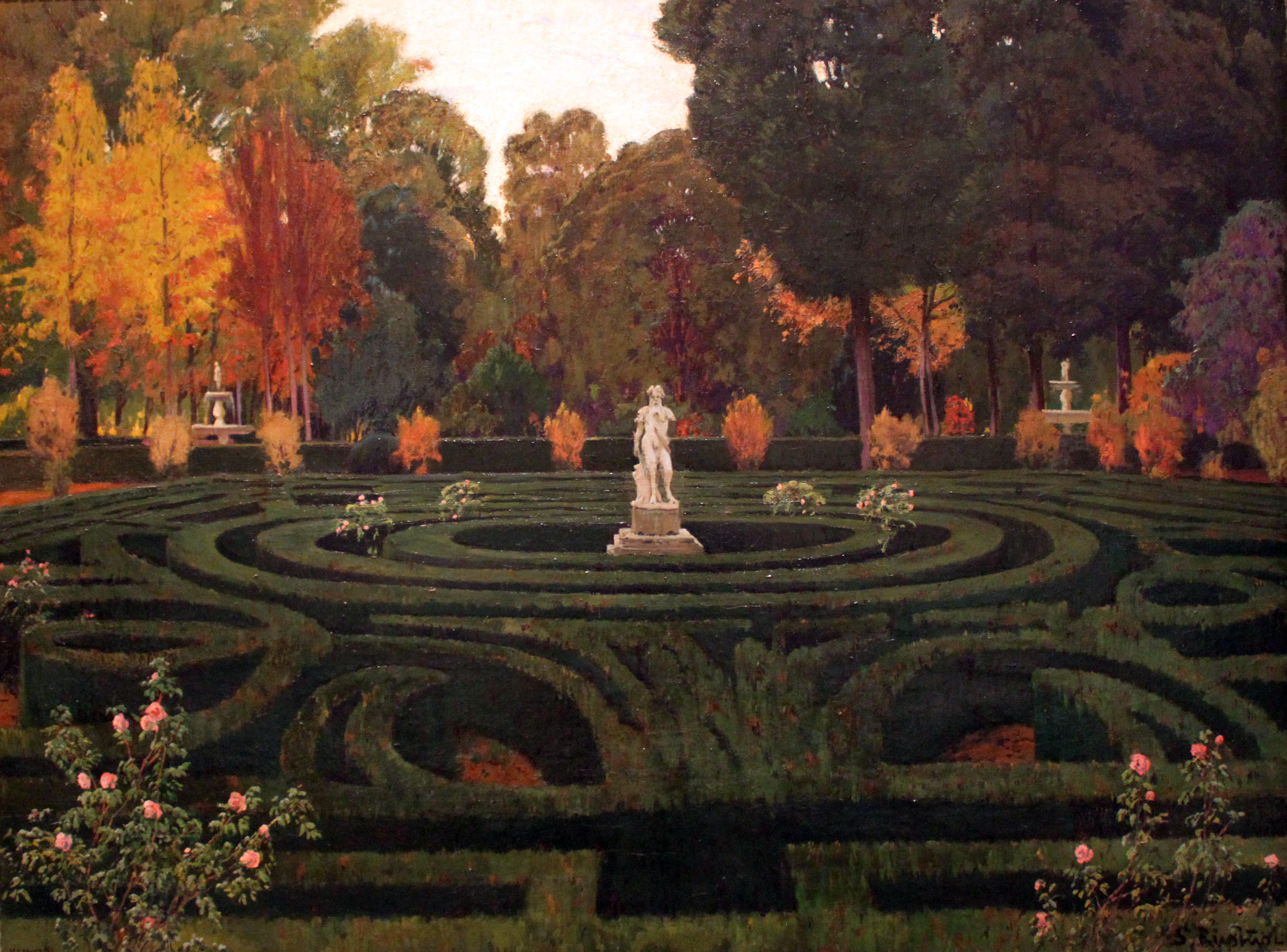
Gardens of Aranjuez, 1911

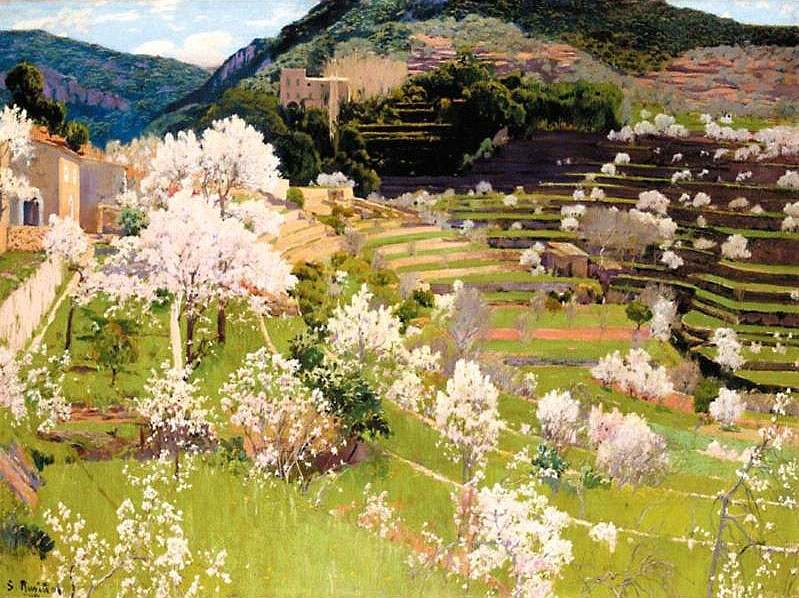
Terraced Garden in Mallorca, 1911

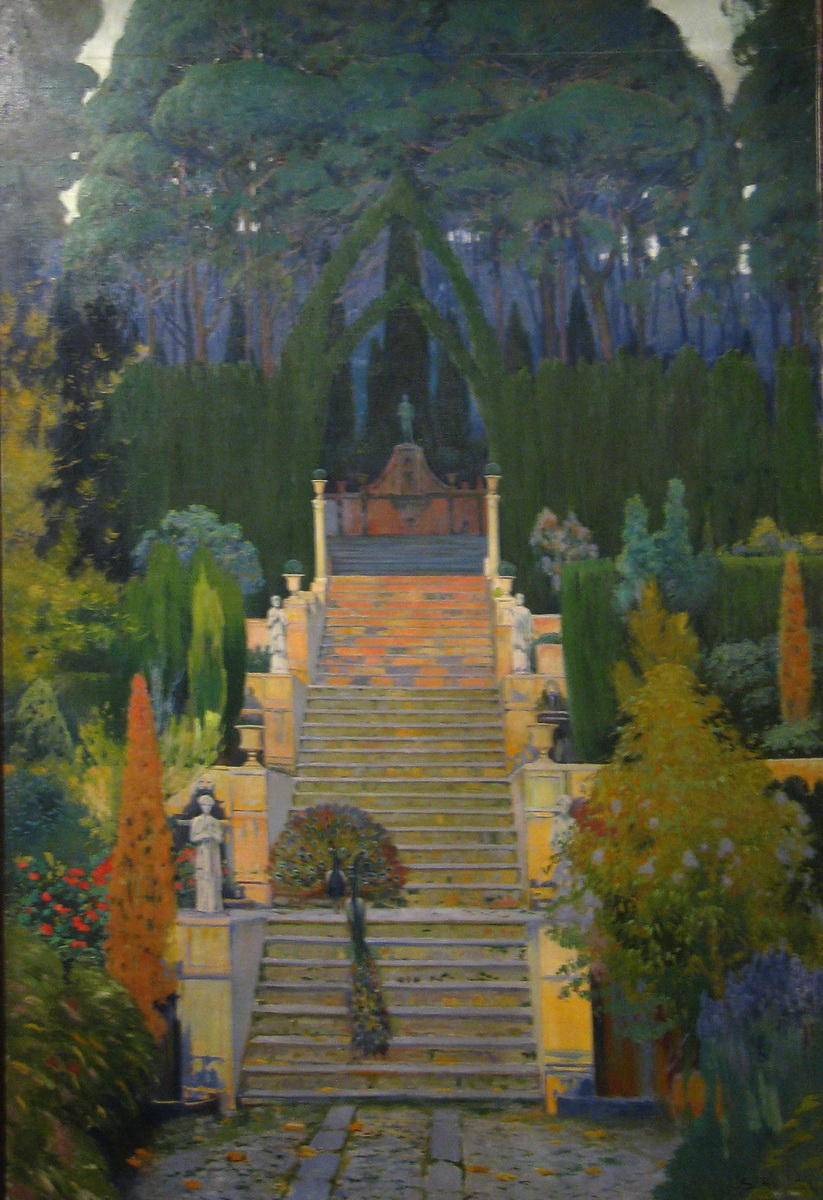
Stately Garden, Palma de Mallorca, 1912

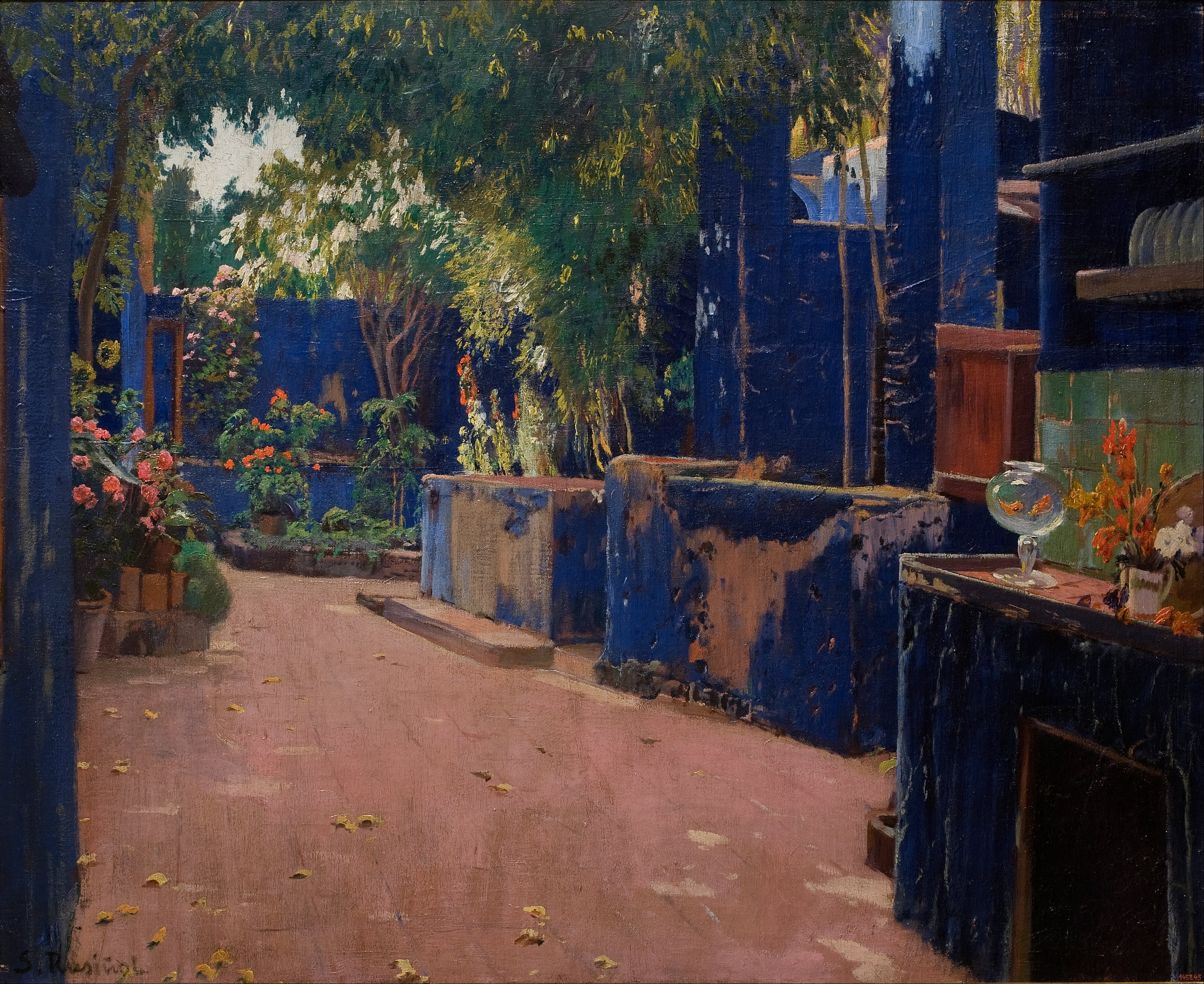
Blue Courtyard. Arenys de Munt, 1913

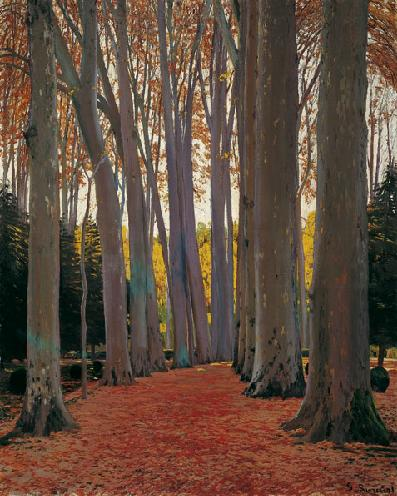
Platans, 1916

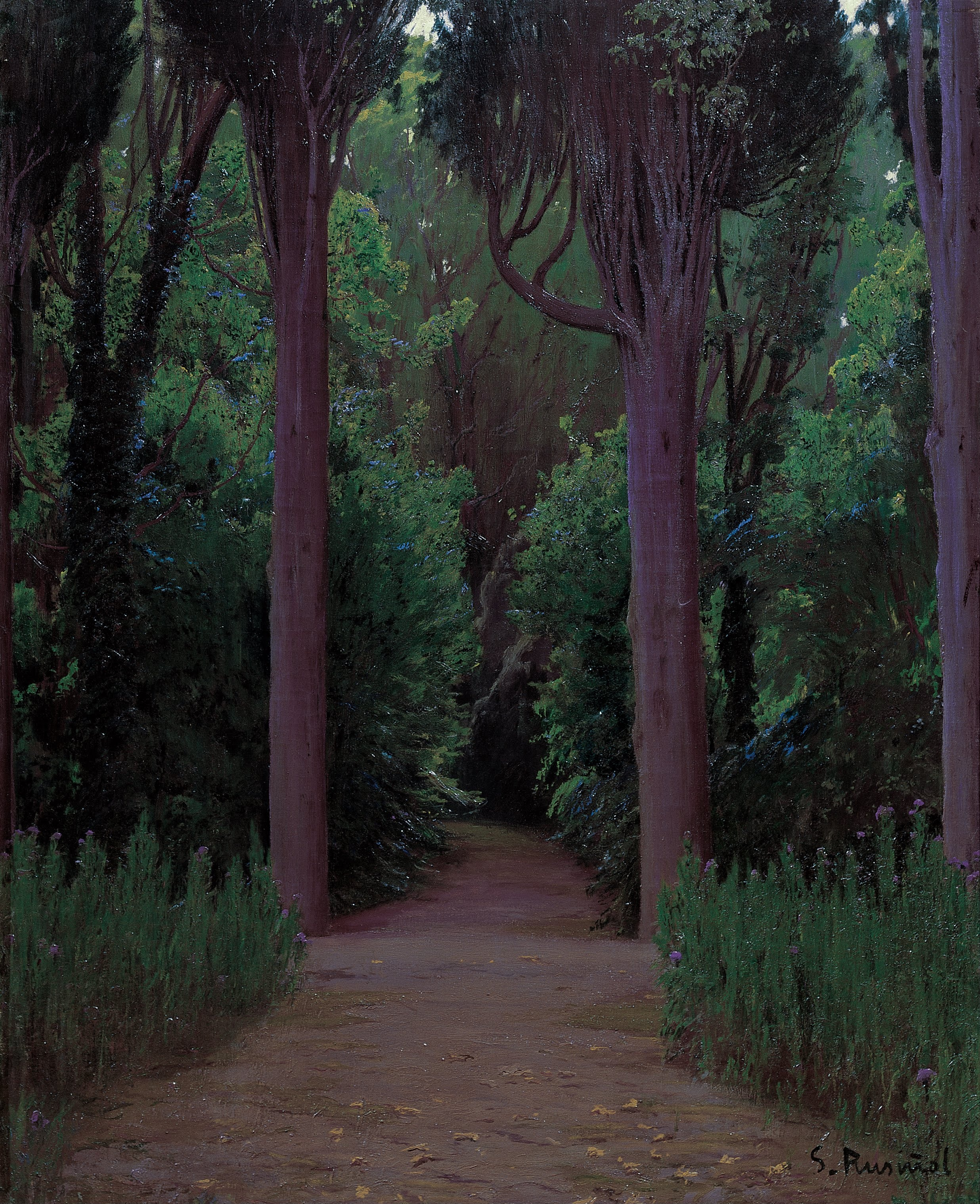
Path in a Park, c. 1920-1925

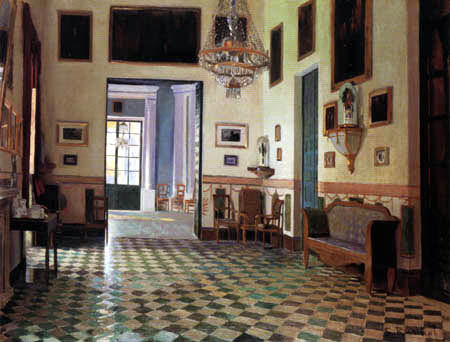
Interior of the Víznar palace

== See also ==
- List of Orientalist artists
- Orientalism
