= Joan Baptista Pujol =

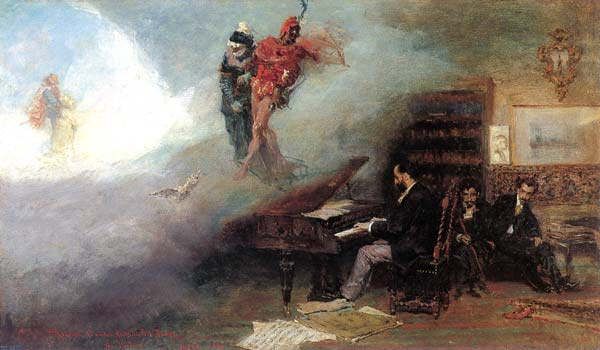
Joan Baptista Pujol playing Faust

Joan Baptista Pujol i Riu (Spanish Juan Bautista Pujol, Barcelona, 1835–1898) was a Catalan pianist and pedagogue. He studied at the Paris Conservatory with Napoleón-Henri Reber. He was the teacher of Enrique Granados, Ricardo Viñes, and Joaquim Malats ^{(ca)} (1872-1912).
