= Allegro de concierto =

Composition for piano by Enrique Granados

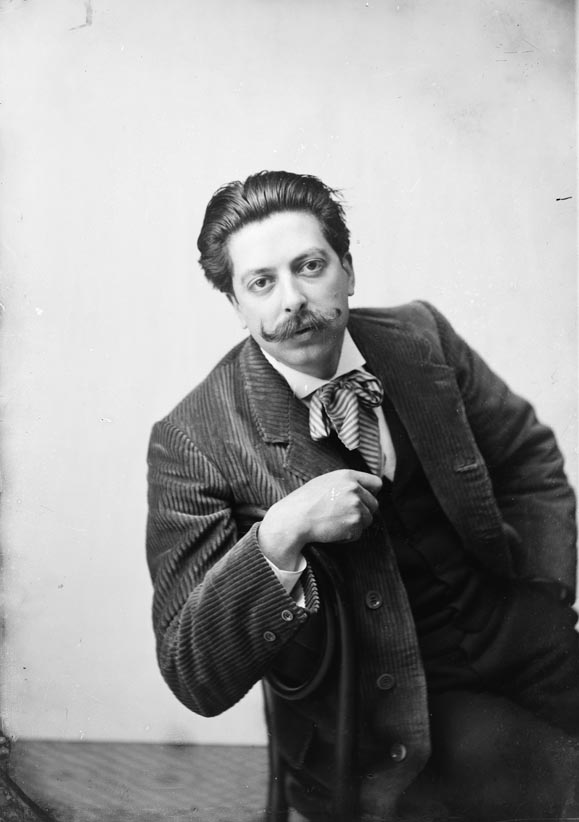
Enrique Granados, c. 1890 – c. 1900

The Allegro de concierto in C♯ major, Op. 46, is a virtuosic showpiece for piano by Enrique Granados, composed between 1903 and 1904. Its lyricism and technical brilliance, reminiscent of Franz Liszt, have made it one of the composer's most popular works.

== History ==
The Allegro de concierto was submitted to a competition organized by Tomás Bretón of the Madrid Royal Conservatory in 1903, which awarded a considerable sum of 500 pesetas for the best "concert allegro" for solo piano. Twenty-four composers participated, among them the young Manuel de Falla, who received an honorable mention. The jury declared Granados the winner with an almost unanimous vote. The composition brought Granados to national attention.

== Structure ==

The structure of the work is somewhat unusual for Granados, as it is held in the traditional sonata form. It is reminiscent of Franz Liszt in its virtuosic piano writing, featuring rapid octaves and arpeggios that span the entire keyboard, and in its use of chordal melodies and forceful accompaniments.

The work begins with a brilliant two-bar flourish, leading to the exposition that opens with the main theme in C♯ major. Its added sixth introduces a sense of pentatonicism, though it is not distinctly Spanish. The lyrical second theme, in G♯ minor (the dominant minor), is followed by a brief reprise of the first theme in G major, leading to a third theme. The development section begins with a new melody, marked "Andante spianato", over the arpeggiated main theme. A cadenza-like transition leads to the recapitulation in C♯ major, though the second theme is held in C♯ minor (the parallel minor). It is followed by a brilliant coda, based on the main theme.

A performance is around 8 minutes in length.

== See also ==
- Allegro de concert (disambiguation)
