= Enric Clarasó =

Catalan sculptor

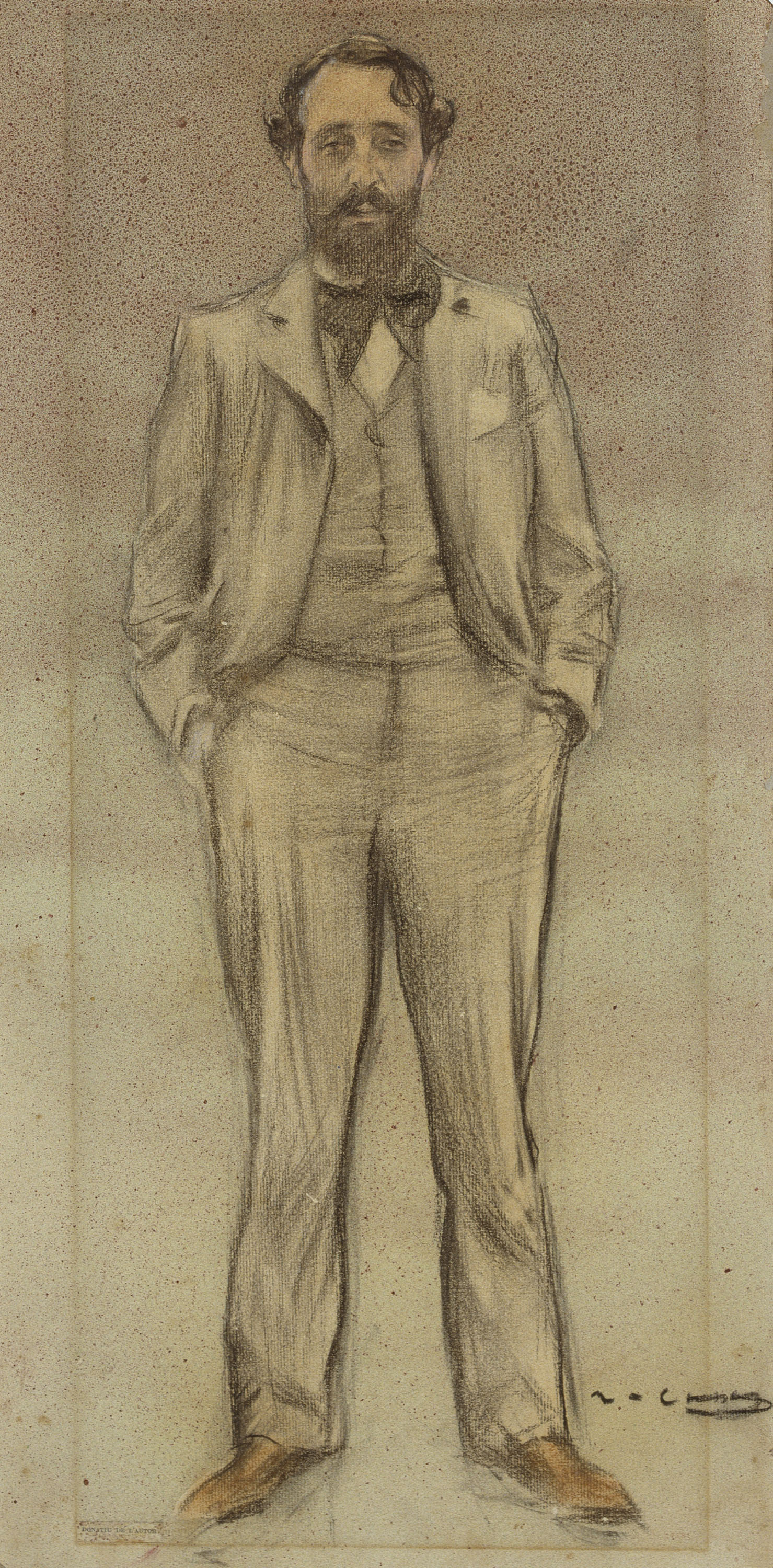
- Enric Clarasó, by Ramon Casas (date unknown)
- Born: Enric Clarasó i Daudí; 14 September 1857; Sant Feliu de Racó
- Died: 1941; Barcelona
- Resting place: Sant Gervasi Cemetery, Barcelona
- Occupation: modernist Catalan sculptor
- Organization: Cercle Artístic de Sant Lluc
- Notable work: Equestrian statue of James I of Aragon in Palma

Enric Clarasó i Daudí (14 September 1857, Sant Feliu del Racó, now a suburb of Castellar del Vallès, Barcelona – 1941, Barcelona) was a modernist Catalan sculptor.

== Biography ==
He was born into a family of artisans. When he was only two, his family moved to Barcelona where he later became an apprentice in a perfume store. After a bout with yellow fever in 1869, he found a position in the workshop of sculptor Joan Roig i Solé. While there, he studied drawing and clay modeling at the Escola de la Llotja. In 1880, he shared his first studio with the painter Miquel Carbonell. When Carbonell moved to Madrid, Clarasó had studios in several different locations, including a space he briefly shared with Santiago Rusiñol that later became the Cau Ferrat Museum.

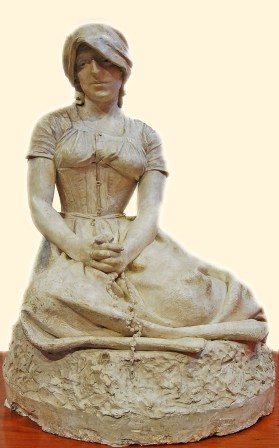
Resignation (1891)

It was during this period that he had his first exhibit at the Sala Parés. He also provided decorations for the Teatre Principal. He also displayed some minor works at the 1888 Barcelona Universal Exposition and took a brief study trip to Paris, where he absorbed some of the new influences entering the art world at that time. He returned to Paris in 1890 and enrolled at the Académie Julian, where he studied with Henri Chapu. After returning to Barcelona, he began participating in a wide variety of exhibitions, including the World's Columbian Exposition in Chicago. His modernist tendencies first expressed themselves during this period.

=== Religious works and public monuments ===
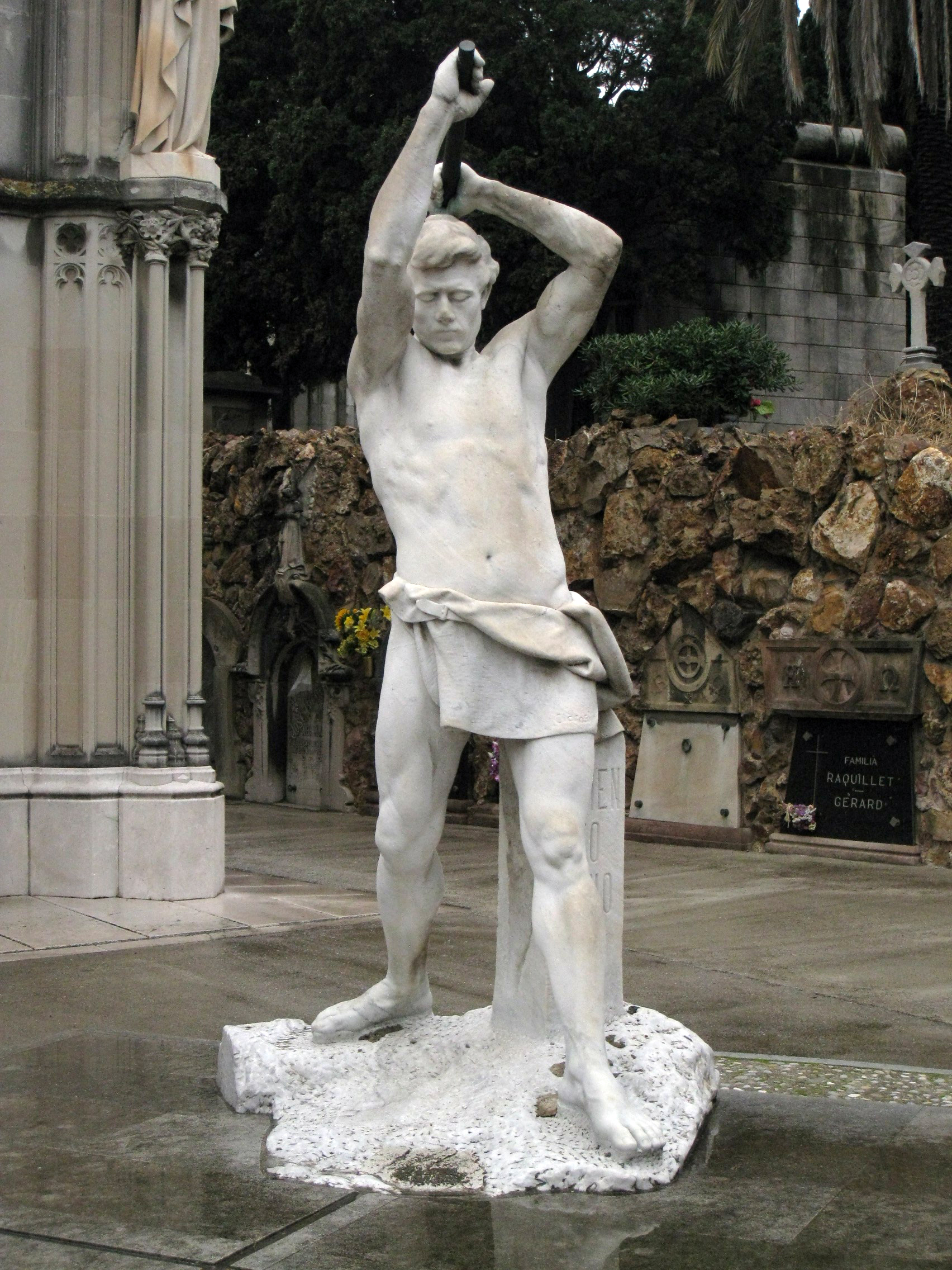
Memento Homo, Montjuïc Cemetery

Paradoxically, it was also at this time that he became a "confirmed Catholic", which was reflected in his works. This seems to have resulted from a combination of his father's death and his 1896 marriage to Pilar Serrat, who was extremely devout. Shortly after, he lost a contract for work on a memorial in the main cemetery of Seville, but was awarded one for an allegorical group at the Palace of Justice in Pamplona. He also became a member of the Cercle Artístic de Sant Lluc, a group that was noted for its defense of Catholic morality. By 1904, he had become sufficiently successful to build his own home in Sarrià, which he called "La Torre de Sant Francesc".

Over the following three decades, he largely abandoned the smaller pieces that had characterized his work, choosing to focus on public commissions and works for religious organizations. Perhaps his most notable work, an equestrian statue of James I of Aragon in Palma, dates from this period. Many of his works may be seen in the Montjuïc Cemetery.

In 1932, he built a large studio next to his home but, the following year, stopped accepting public commissions and creating works for exhibition, concentrating instead on writing his memoirs, which were published in 1934. He ceased working entirely a few years later, near the end of the Civil War, when a group of Rojos broke into his workshop and destroyed the figures of saints he had stored there. He was buried next to his father in the Sant Gervasi Cemetery on Tibidabo.
