= Enrique Granados =

Spanish pianist and composer (1867–1916)

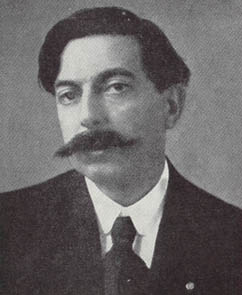
Enrique Granados

Enric Granados i Campiña, born Pantaleón Enrique Joaquín Granados Campiña (27 July 1867 – 24 March 1916) was a Spanish and Catalan composer and pianist. Along with Isaac Albéniz, Joaquin Malats and other pianists, he was part of the modern Catalan school of piano, initiated by Pere Tintorer.

He is known for his piano works, such as the Goyescas suite, on which he also based the opera of the same name. He created a piano school in Barcelona, the Acadèmia Granados, which has produced a long list of talented pianists, with such notable figures as Frank Marshall and Alicia de Larrocha.

He died in the attack on the SS Sussex, in the English Channel, when it was torpedoed by the German navy during the course of World War I. He had received the Order of Charles III and the French Legion of Honour.

Granados' personal collection is preserved in the Library of Catalonia and the Museu de la Música de Barcelona, and includes his epistolary collection with letters from Pablo Casals, Enrique Fernández Arbós, Jules Massenet, and others.

== Life ==
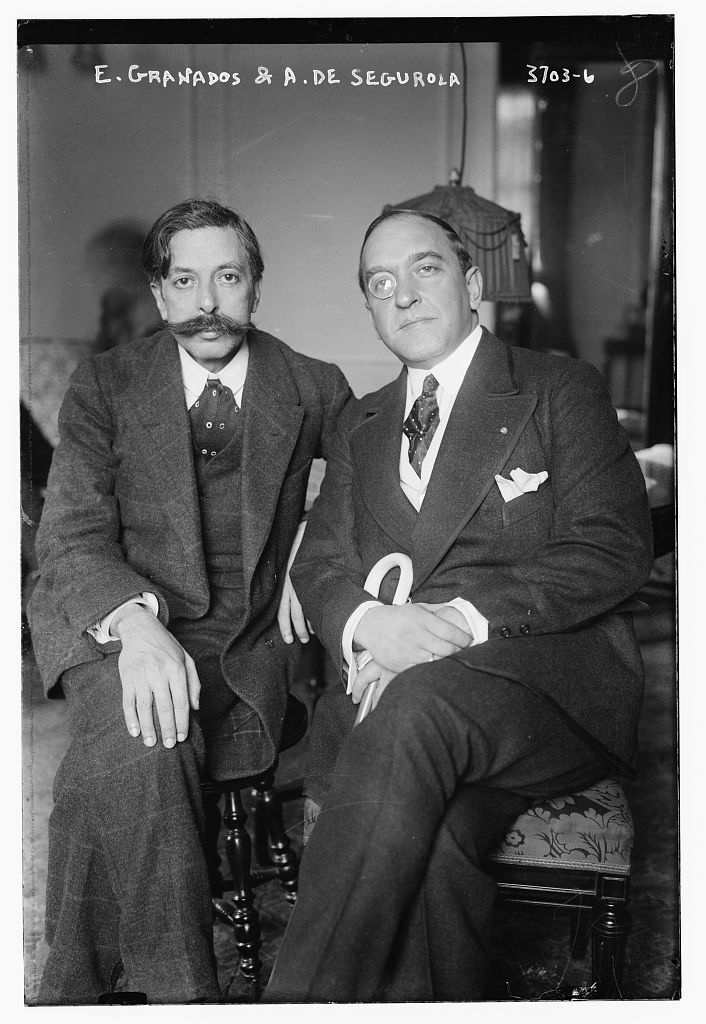
Enrique Granados and Andrés de Segurola in 1915

Pantaleón Enrique Joaquín Granados Campiña was born in Lleida, Spain, the son of Calixto José de la Trinidad Granados y Armenteros, a Spanish army captain who was born in Havana, Cuba, and Enriqueta Elvira Campiña de Herrera, from Santander, Spain. As a young man he studied piano in Barcelona, where his teachers included Francisco Jurnet and Joan Baptista Pujol. In 1887 he went to Paris to study. He was unable to become a student at the Paris Conservatoire, but he was able to take private lessons with a conservatoire professor, Charles-Wilfrid de Bériot, whose mother, the soprano Maria Malibran, was of Spanish ancestry. Bériot insisted on extreme refinement in tone production, which strongly influenced Granados' teaching of pedal technique. He also fostered Granados' abilities in improvisation. Just as important were his studies with Felip Pedrell. He returned to Barcelona in 1889. His first successes were at the end of the 1890s, with the opera María del Carmen, which attracted the attention of King Alfonso XIII.

In 1903, Granados participated in a competition organized by Tomás Bretón of the Madrid Royal Conservatory, which awarded a considerable sum of 500 pesetas for the best "concert allegro" for solo piano. Granados submitted his Allegro de concierto, Op. 46, for which the jury declared him the winner with an almost unanimous vote. The win brought Granados to national attention.

In 1911 Granados premiered his suite for piano Goyescas, which became his most famous work. It is a set of six pieces based on paintings of Francisco Goya. Such was the success of this work that he was encouraged to expand it. He wrote an opera based on the subject in 1914, but the outbreak of World War I forced the European premiere to be canceled. It was performed for the first time in New York City on 28 January 1916 and was very well received. Shortly afterwards, he was invited to perform a piano recital for President Woodrow Wilson. Before leaving New York, Granados also made live-recorded player piano music rolls for the New-York-based Aeolian Company's "Duo-Art" system, all of which survive today and can be heard – his last recordings.

== Death ==
A delay in New York, incurred by accepting a recital invitation, caused him to miss his boat back to Spain. Instead, he took a ship to England, where he boarded the passenger ferry SS Sussex for Dieppe, France. On the way across the English Channel, the Sussex was torpedoed by a German U-boat, as part of the German World War I policy of unrestricted submarine warfare. According to witness Daniel Sargent, Granados' wife, Amparo, was too heavy to get into a lifeboat. Granados refused to leave her and positioned her on a small life raft on which she knelt and he clung. Both then drowned within sight of other passengers. However, according to a different account from another survivor, "A survivor of the 1916 torpedo attack on a Cross channel ferry, Sussex, recognised Spanish composer Granados in a lifeboat, his wife in the water. Granados dived in to save her and perished." A subsequent account claims that Granados sank to the bottom of the ocean while attempting to save his wife due to a money belt fastened to his waist which was filled with gold from his American performances. Due to the unstable global economy as a result of World War I, Granados insisted on being paid in gold.

The personal papers of Enrique Granados are preserved in, among other institutions, the National Library of Catalonia.

== Music and influence ==
Granados wrote piano music, chamber music (a piano quintet, a piano trio, music for violin and piano), songs, zarzuelas, and an orchestral tone poem based on Dante's Divine Comedy. Many of his piano compositions have been transcribed for the classical guitar; examples include Dedicatoria, Danza No. 5, and Goyescas.

His music can be divided into three styles or periods:

1. A romantic style including such pieces as Escenas Románticas and Escenas Poeticas.
2. A more typically nationalist, Spanish style including such pieces as Danzas Españolas (Spanish Dances), 6 Piezas sobre cantos populares españoles (Six Pieces based on popular Spanish songs).
3. The Goya (Goyesca) period, which includes the piano suite Goyescas, the opera Goyescas, various Tonadillas for voice and piano, and other works.

Granados was a significant influence on at least two other famous Spanish composers and musicians, Manuel de Falla and Pablo Casals. He was also the teacher of composer Rosa García Ascot.

== Some important works ==
- 12 danzas españolas (1890) for piano; Op. 37, H. 142, DLR 1:2. The contents of the four volumes are: Vol. 1: Galante (or Minueto), Oriental, Fandango (or Zarabanda); Vol. 2: Villanesca; Andaluza (or Playera); Rondalla aragonesa (or Jota); Vol. 3: Valenciana; Sardana (or Asturiana); Romántica (or Mazurca); Vol. 4: Melancólica (or Danza Triste); Zambra; Arabesca.
- María del Carmen (1898), opera
- Allegro de concierto (1904)
- Escenas románticas (1903) for piano. The individual "scenes" are: Mazurca; Berceuse; Allegretto; Mazurka; Allegro appassionato; Epílogo
- Dante (1908), symphonic poem
- Tonadillas al estilo antiguo, H136 (1910) for voice and piano, settings of a group of poems by Fernando Periquet. Titles of individual songs in the collection are: "Amor y odio"; "Callejeo"; "El majo discreto"; "El majo olvidado"; "El majo tímido"; "El mirar de la maja"; "El tra-la-la y el punteado"; "La maja de Goya"; "La maja dolorosa I (Oh muerte cruel!), II (Ay majo de mi vida!), and III (De aquel majo amante)"; "La currutacas modestas" (duet).
- Canciones españolas for voice and piano. Titles of individual songs in the collection are: "Yo no tengo quien me llore"; "Cantar I"; "Por una mirada, un mundo"; "Si al retiro me llevas..."; "Canción"; "Serenata"; "Canto gitano".
- Cançons catalanes for voice and piano. Titles of individual songs in the collection are: "L'ocell profeta"; "Elegia eterna"; "Cançó de gener"; "Cançó d'amor"; "Cançoneta"; "La boira".
- Goyescas (1911), suite for piano, subtitled "Los majos enamorados". It consists of six pieces in two books. Movements are: Book 1: "Los requiebros"; "Coloquio en la reja"; "El fandango de candil"; "Quejas o La maja y el ruiseñor"; Book 2: "El amor y la muerte"; "Epílogo (Serenata del espectro)". "El pelele", although not published as part of the Goyescas, is usually appended to it. In performance it is played as the seventh and last piece. It is based on the music of the opening scene of Granados's opera Goyescas, in which a "pelele" is being tossed in the air by the "majas".
- Bocetos (1912) which contains: "Despertar del cazador"; "El hada y el niño"; "Vals muy lento"; "La campana de la tarde".
- Colección de canciones amatorias (1915) for voice and piano. Titles of individual songs in the collection are: "Descúbrase el pensamiento de mi secreto cuidado"; "Mañanica era"; "Llorad, corazón, que tenéis razón 'Lloraba la niña'"; "Mira que soy niña"; "No lloréis, ojuelos"; "Iban al pinar 'Serranas de Cuenca'"; "Gracia mía".
- Goyescas, opera, 1916
- 6 Estudios expresivos
- 6 Piezas sobre cantos populares españoles, which include: "Añoranza"; "Ecos de la parranda"; "Vascongada"; "Marcha oriental"; "Zambra"; "Zapateado"
- Madrigal, for cello and piano
- 8 Valses Poéticos, for piano, including No 6 "Vals Poético"
- Trío, for piano, violin, and cello
- "Military March", for piano, Op.38

== Media ==
"Danza No. 5" (1890)
Granados' "Danza No. 5" is one of the 12 danzas españolas (1890) for piano. It is commonly transcribed for classical guitar as presented here by Sharon Isbin at the White House Classical Music Student Workshop Concert (2009-11-04)

Danza Española, op. 37, h. 142 – XII. Arabesca
Performed by William Riley

== Recordings ==
- Goyescas, Part 1, Los Requiebros as recorded by Granados on piano roll, c. 1913, Paris (Info)
- L'escola pianística catalana (Enregistraments històrics) (la mà de guido, LMG3060)
- Enrique Granados today playing his 1913 interpretations (The Welte Mignon Mystery Vol. I)
- Enrique Granados: Composer as Pianist (Pierian Recording Society, PIR0002) ASIN B000051ZMS
- Masters of the Piano Roll: Granados Plays Granados (Dal Segno Records, DSPRCD008)
- The Catalan Piano Tradition (VAI Audio, 1001) ASIN B000003LIC
- Rollos de Pianola (Obras de Albéniz, Granados, Turina, Ocón, Chapí, Alonso y Otros) (Almaviva, DS – 0141) ASIN B000GI34D6
- Piano Rolls (The Reproducing Piano Roll Foundation)
