= OMDB =

OMDB may refer to:

- the ICAO airport code for Dubai International Airport
- Over my dead body (disambiguation), several topics
- Online music database
- "OMDB", a song by Rod Wave from the album SoulFly (2021)
- "OMDB", a song by Big Red Machine from their debut album of the same name (2018)
- “OMDB”, the Open Media Database
