= Ramon Casas =

Catalan artist (1866–1932)

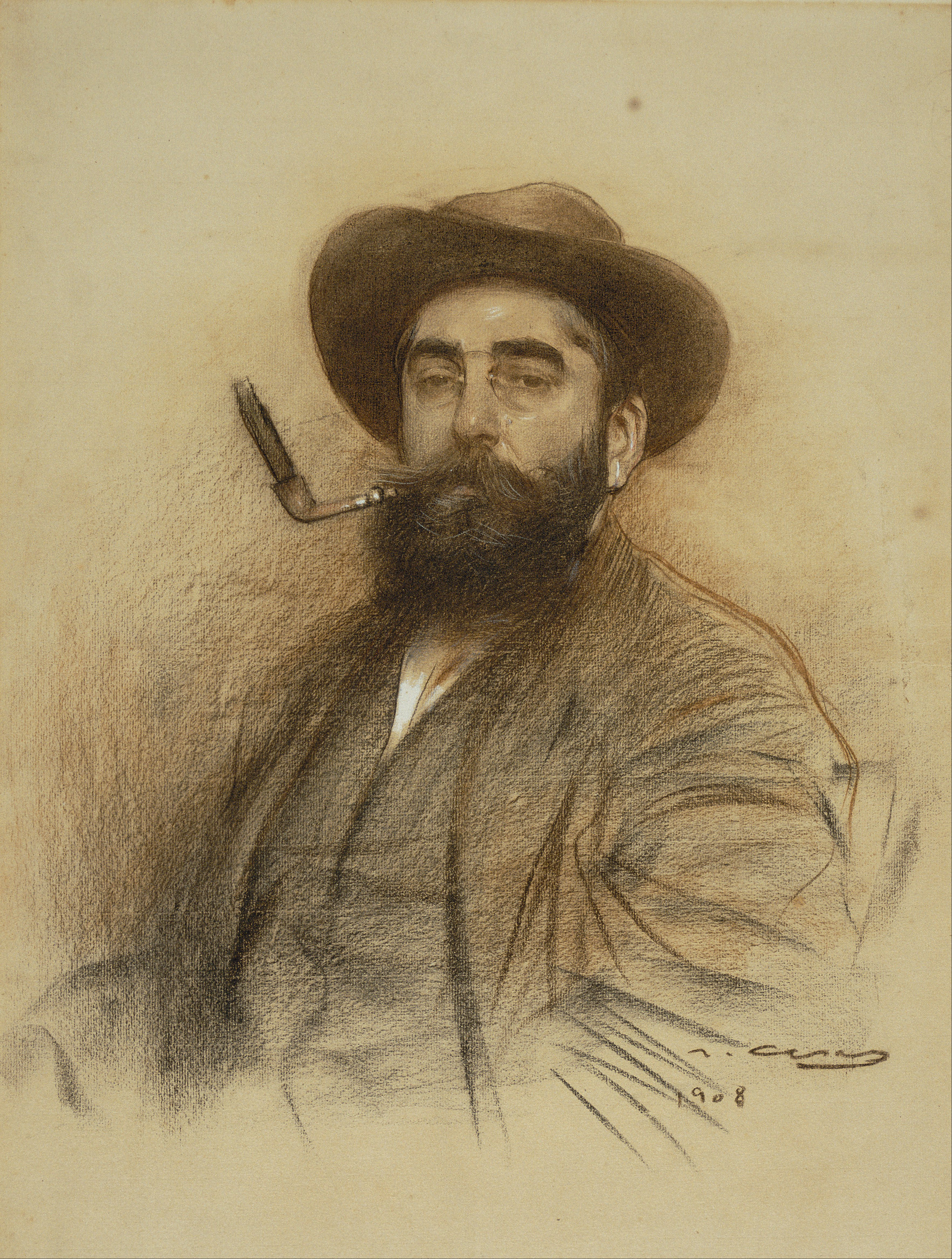
- Self-portrait, 1908
- Born: Ramon Casas i Carbó; 4 January 1866; Barcelona, Spain
- Died: 29 February 1932 (aged 66); Barcelona, Spain
- Known for: Painting
- Movement: Modernisme

Ramon Casas i Carbó (Catalan pronunciation: [rəˈmoŋ ˈkazəs]; 4 January 1866 – 29 February 1932) was a Catalan artist from Spain. Living through a turbulent time in the history of his native Barcelona, Catalonia, he was known as a portraitist, sketching and painting the intellectual, economic, and political elite of Barcelona, Paris, Madrid, and beyond. He was also known for his paintings of crowd scenes ranging from the audience at a bullfight to the assembly for an execution to rioters in the Barcelona streets (El garrot). Also a graphic designer, his posters and postcards helped to define the Catalan art movement known as modernisme.

== Barcelona and Paris ==
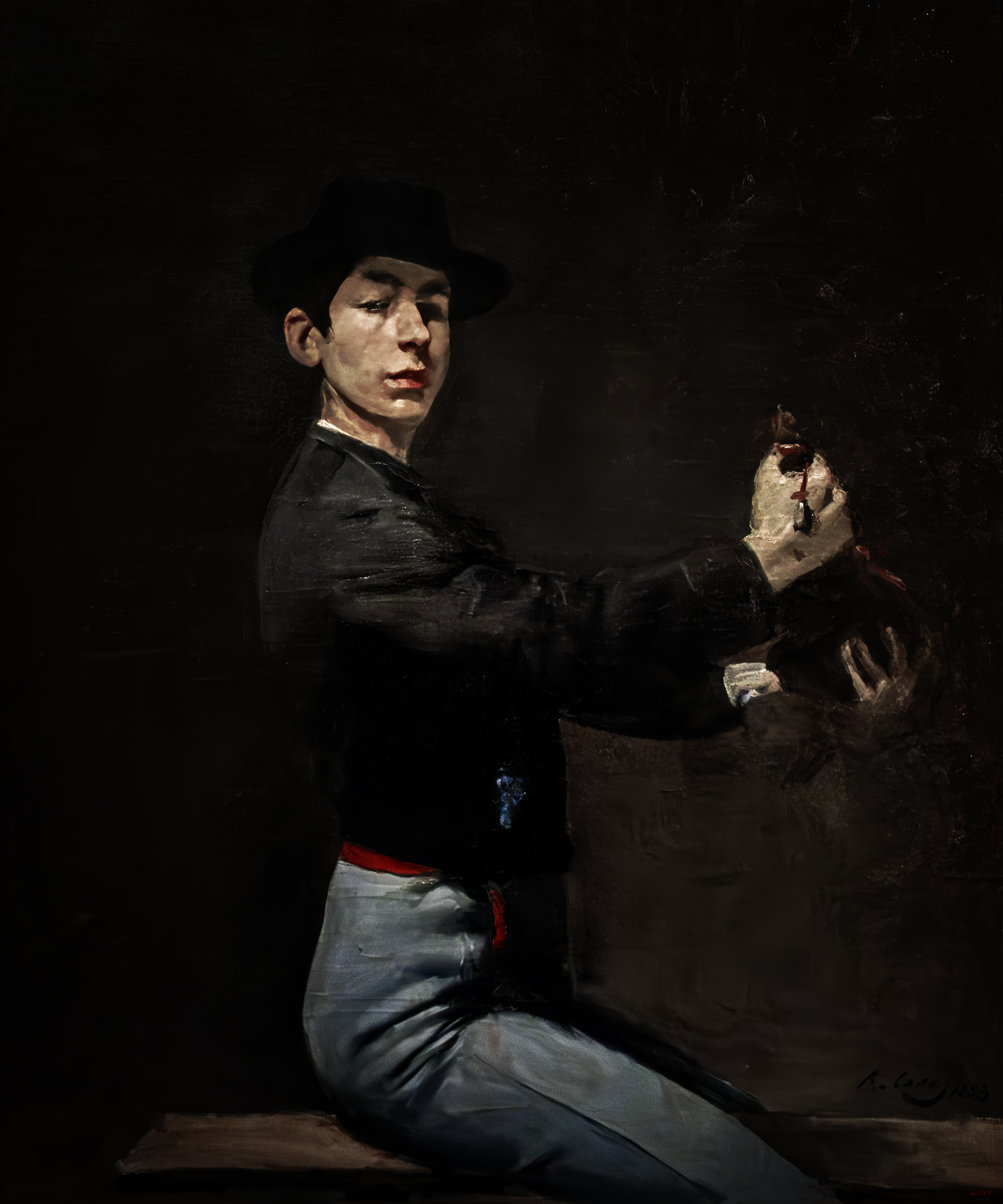
Self-portrait as a flamenco dancer, 1883

Casas was born in Barcelona. His father had made a fortune in Matanzas, Cuba; his mother was from a well-off Spanish family. In 1877 he abandoned the regular course of schooling to study art in the studio of Joan Vicens. In 1881, still in his teens, he was a co-founder of the magazine L'Avenç; the 9 October 1881 issue included his sketch of the cloister of Sant Benet in Bages. That same month, accompanied by his cousin Miquel Carbó i Carbó, a medical student, he began his first stay in Paris, where he studied that winter at the Carolus Duran Academy and later at the Gervex Academy, and functioned as a Paris correspondent for L'Avenç. The next year he had a piece exhibited in Barcelona at the Sala Parés, and in 1883 in Paris the Salon des Champs Elysées exhibited his portrait of himself dressed as a flamenco dancer; the piece won him an invitation as a member of the salon of the Societé d'artistes françaises.

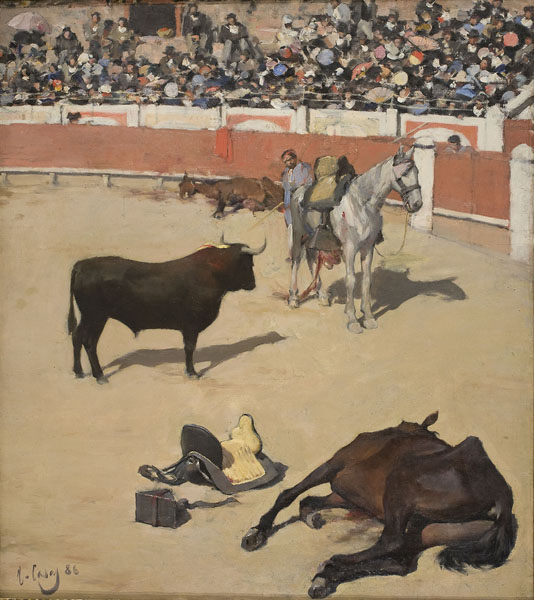
Bulls (Dead Horses), 1886

The next few years he continued to paint and travel, spending most autumns and winters in Paris and the rest of the year in Spain, mostly in Barcelona but also in Madrid and Granada; his 1886 painting of the crowd at the Madrid bullfighting ring was to be the first of many highly detailed paintings of crowds. That year he survived tuberculosis, and convalesced for the winter in Barcelona. Among the artists he met in this period of his life, and who influenced him, were Laureà Barrau, Santiago Rusiñol, Eugène Carrière, Pierre Puvis de Chavannes, and Ignacio Zuloaga.

Casas and Rusiñol traveled through Catalonia in 1889, and collaborated on a short book Por Cataluña (desde mi carro), with text by Rusiñol and illustrations by Casas. Returning together to Paris, they lived together at the Moulin de la Galette in Montmartre, along with painter and art critic Miquel Utrillo and the sketch artist Ramon Canudas. Rusiñol chronicled these times in as series of articles "Desde el Molino" ("From the Mill") for La Vanguardia; again Casas illustrated. Casas became an associate of the Societé d'artistes françaises, allowing him to exhibit two works annually at their salon without having to pass through jury competition.

With Rusiñol and with sculptor Enric Clarasó he exhibited at Sala Parés in 1890; his work from this period, such as Plen Air and the Bal du Moulin de la Galette lies somewhere between an academic style and that of the French Impressionists. The style that would become known as modernisme had not yet fully come together, but the key people were beginning to know one another, and successful Spanish artists were increasingly coming to identify themselves with Barcelona as much as with Paris.

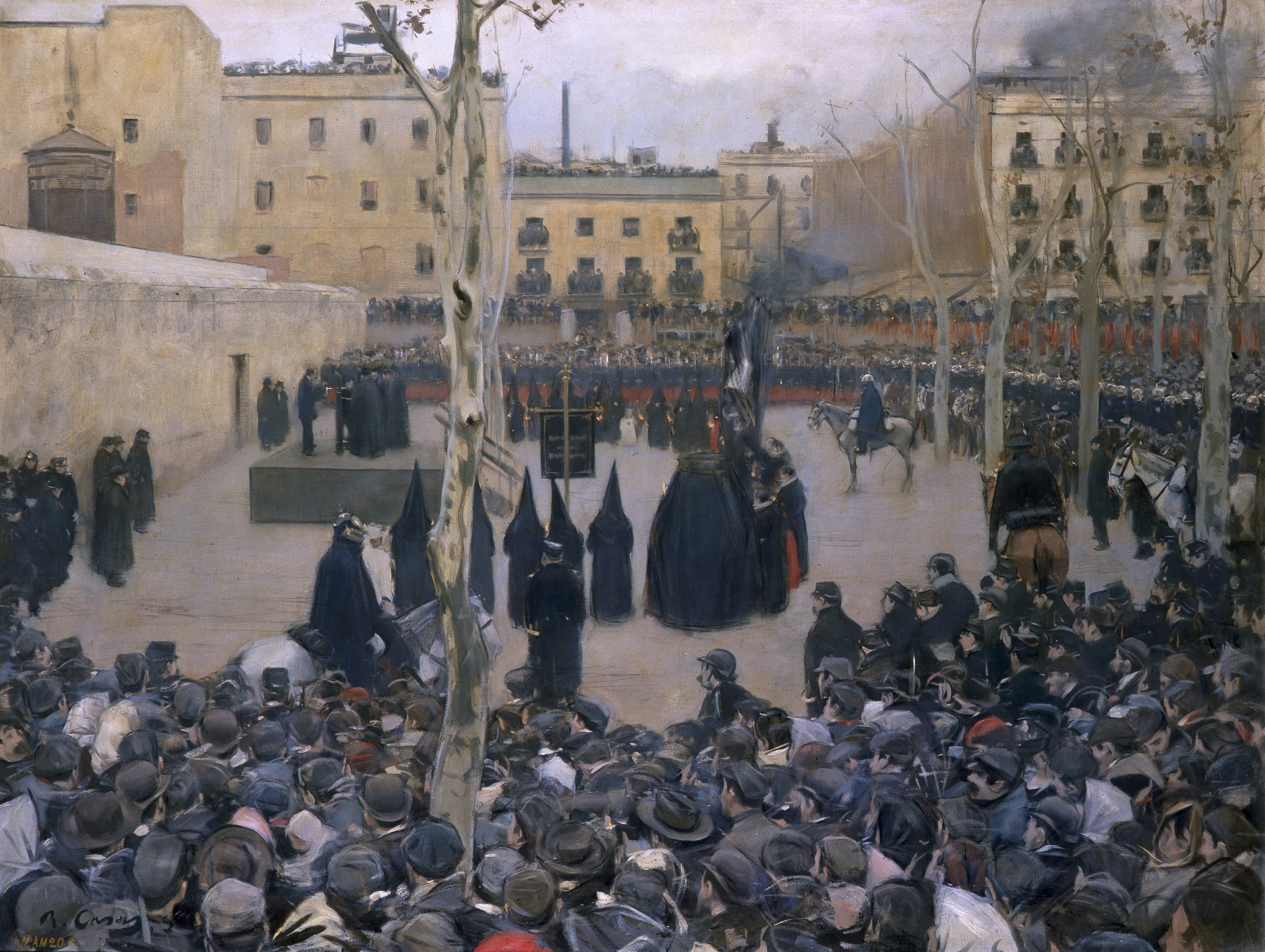
Garrote vil (Garrotte), 1894

His fame continued to spread through Europe and beyond as he exhibited successfully in Madrid (1892, 1894), Berlin (1891, 1896) and at the World Columbian Exposition in Chicago (1893); meanwhile the bohemian circle that included Casas and Rusiñol began with greater frequency to organize exhibitions of their own in Barcelona and Sitges. With this increasing activity in Spain, he settled more in Barcelona, but continued to travel to Paris for the annual Salons.

== Els Quatre Gats ==
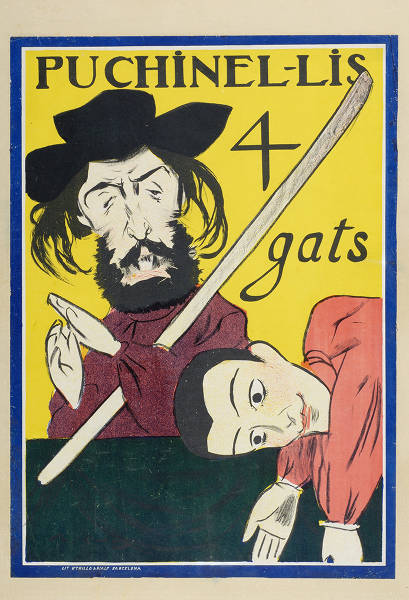
Poster for a show at Els Quatre Gats

The emerging modernista art world gained a center with the opening of Els Quatre Gats, a bar modeled on Le Chat Noir in Paris. Casas largely financed this bar on the ground floor of Casa Martí, a building by Architect Josep Puig i Cadafalch in Montsió Street near the center of Barcelona; it opened in June 1897 and lasted for six years (and was later reconstructed in 1978). His partners in the enterprise were Pere Romeu, who largely played host to the bar, as well as Rusiñol and Miquel Utrillo.

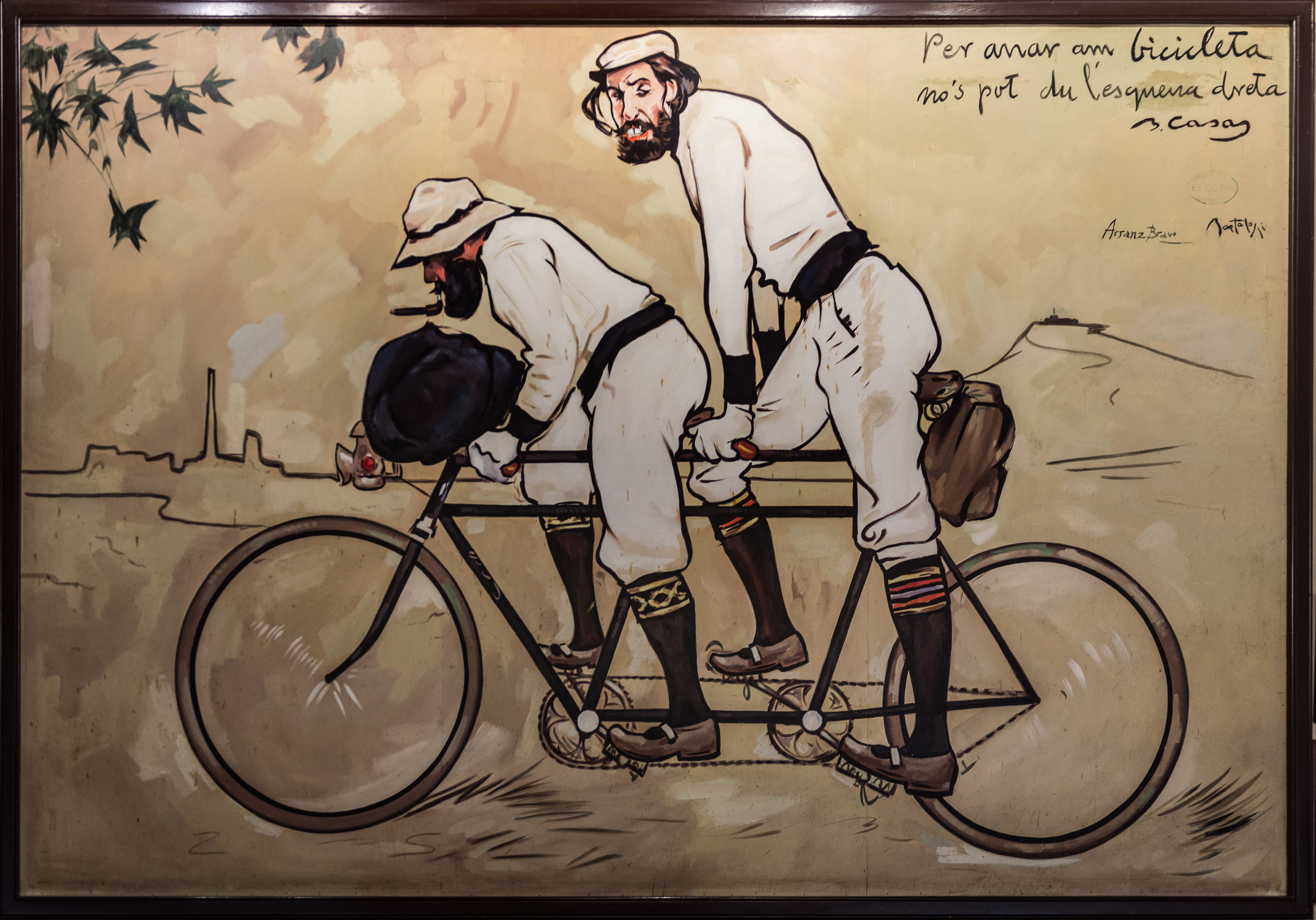
Ramón Casas and Pere Romeu on a Tandem, 1897

The bar hosted tertulias and revolving art exhibits, including one of the first one-man shows by Pablo Picasso; the most prominent piece in its permanent collection was a lighthearted Casas self-portrait, depicting him smoking a pipe while pedaling a tandem bicycle with Romeu as his stoker. The original of the painting—or most of it: nearly a third of the canvas was cut away by an intervening owner—is now in Barcelona's Museu Nacional d'Art de Catalunya (MNAC); a creditable reproduction resides in the revived Els Quatre Gats.

Like Le Chat Noir, Els Quatre Gats attempted its own literary and artistic magazine, to which Casas was a major contributor. That was short-lived, but was soon followed by Pèl & Ploma, which would slightly outlast the bar itself, and Forma (1904–1908), to which Casas also contributed. Pèl & Ploma sponsored several prominent art exhibitions, including Casas' own well-received first solo show (1899 at Sala Parés), which brought together a retrospective of his oil paintings as well as a set of charcoal sketches of contemporary figures prominent in Barcelona's cultural life.

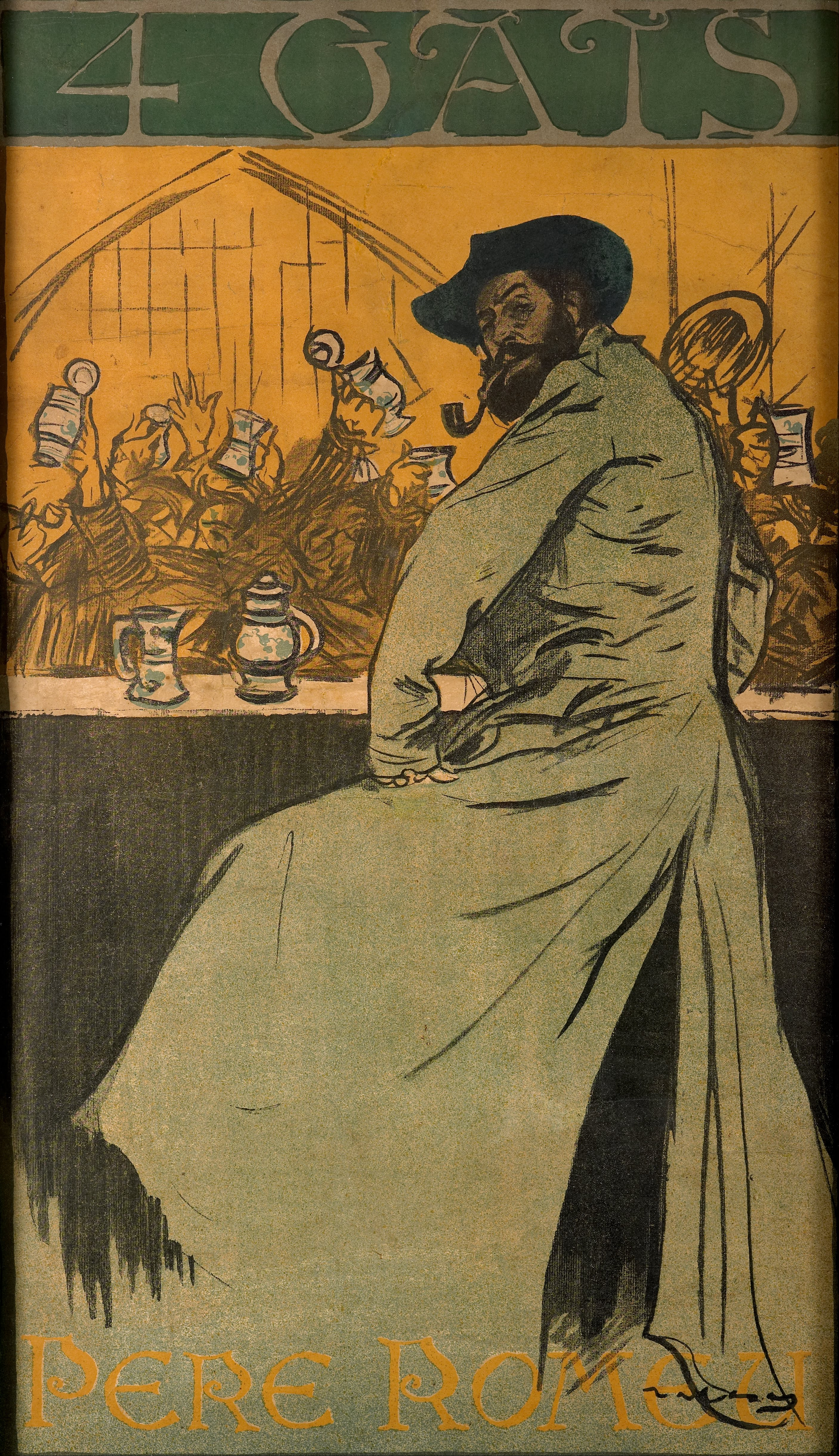
4 Gats, poster, 1900

While his painting career continued successfully through this period, as part owner of a bar Casas engaged heavily in graphic design, adopting the Art Nouveau style that would come to define modernisme. He designed posters for the café, many of which depicted Romeu's gaunt visage. He also executed a series of advertisements for Codorniu, a brand of cava (or, as its ads of the time claimed, champagne) and anisette. Over the next decade, he would design poster ads for everything from cigarette papers to the Enciclopèdia Espasa.

== His prominence grows ==
For the 1900 Exposition Universelle (1900) in Paris, the Spanish committee chose two of Casas' full-length oil portraits: an 1891 portrait of Erik Satie and an 1895 portrait of Casas' sister Elisa. His 1894 Garrote Vil —a portrayal of an execution— won a major prize in Munich in 1901; his work was shown not only in the major capitals of Europe, but as far away as Buenos Aires, Argentina. In 1902, twelve of his canvasses were installed permanently in the rotunda of the Cercle de Liceu, the exclusive private club associated with Barcelona's famous opera house.

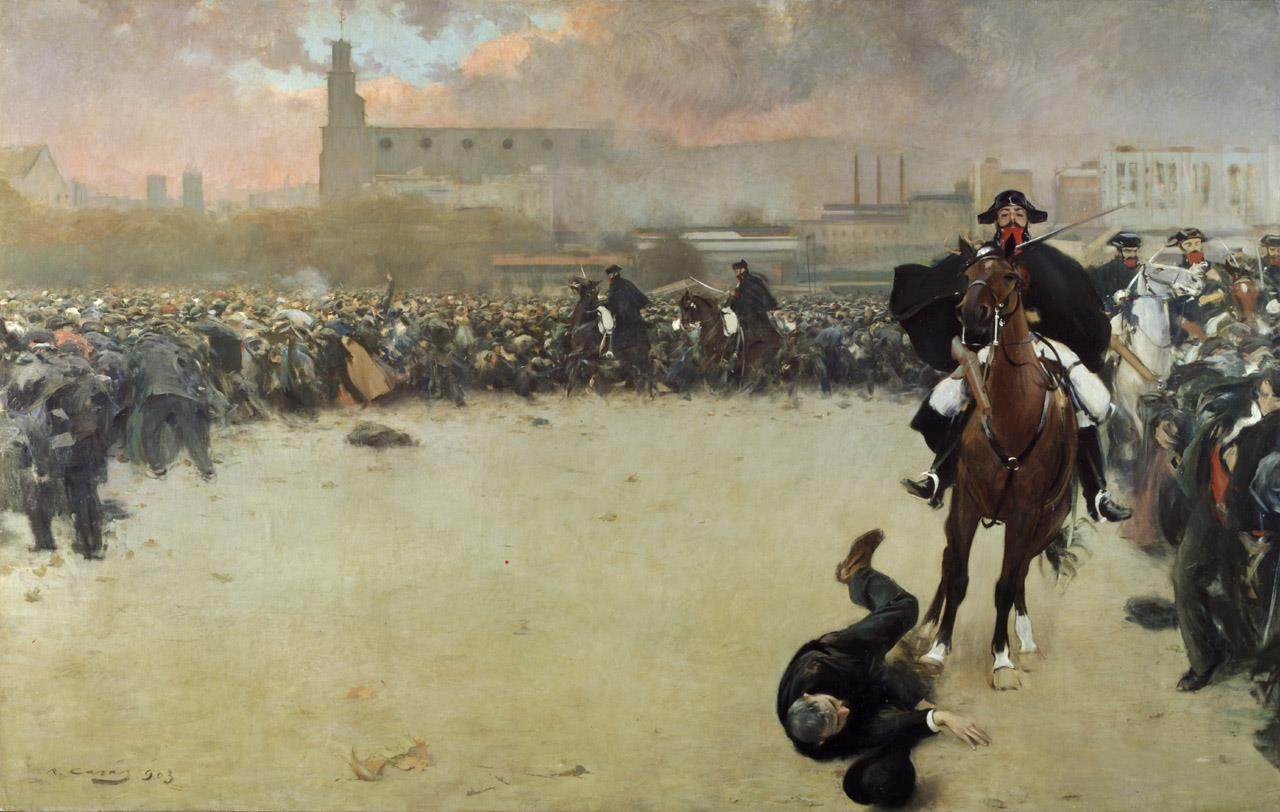
The Charge or Barcelona 1902

In 1903 he became a full Societaire of the Salon du Champ de Mars in Paris, which would have allowed him to exhibit there annually, but in fact he only exhibited there for two more years. In 1903, his piece for the salon was one that had originally been called La Carga (The Charge), which he retitled Barcelona 1902 in reference to a recent general strike, although in fact the painting, which shows Guardia Civil routing a crowd, had been executed at least two years before that strike. In 1904, the same piece won first prize at the General Exposition in Madrid.

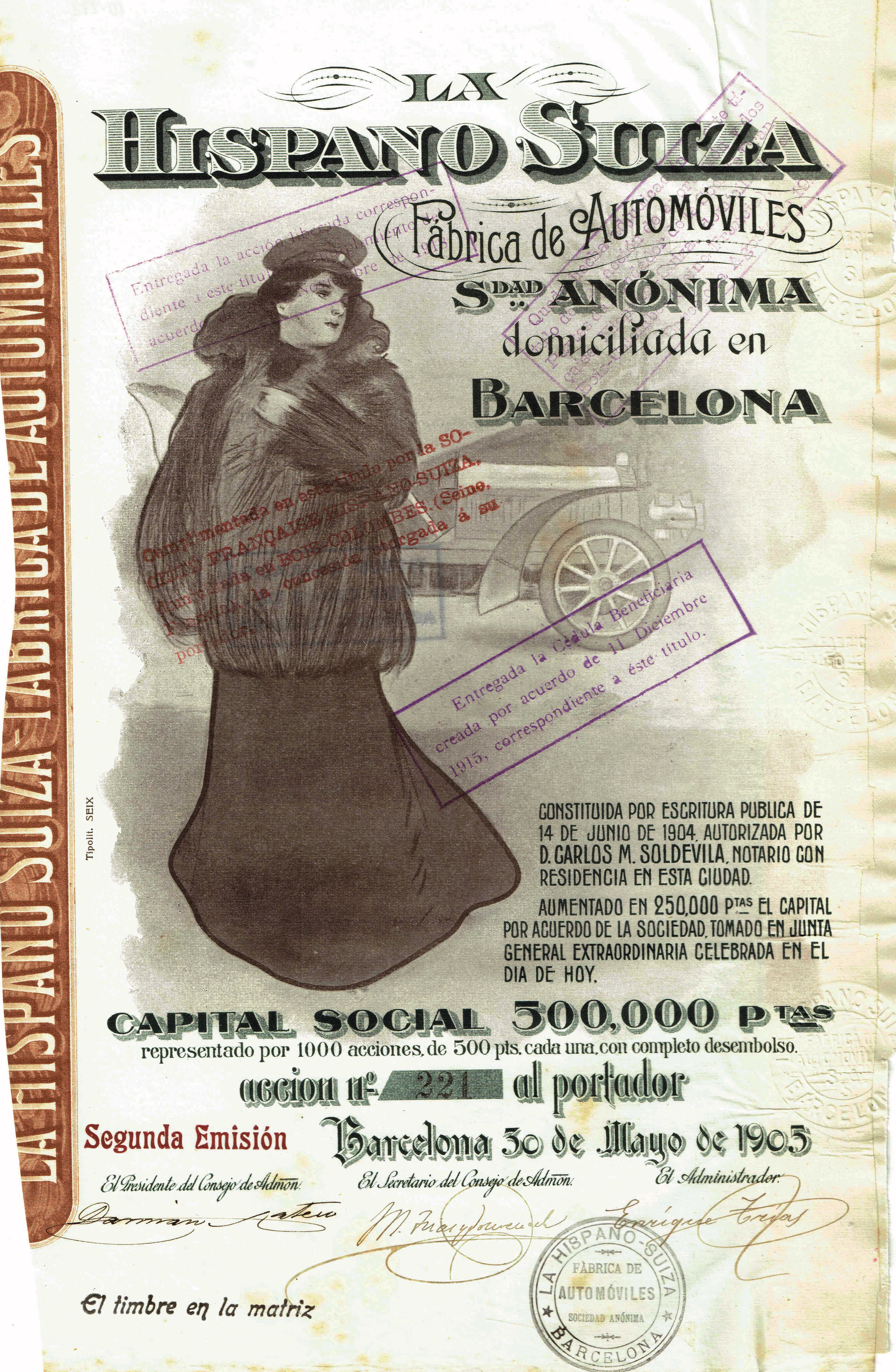
Share of the Hispano Suiza Fabrica de Automoviles SA, 1905, designed by Ramón Casas with the Italian actress Teresa Mariani as motif

During a 1904 sojourn in Madrid, he produced a series of sketches of the Madrid intelligentsia, and befriended painters Eliseu Meifrèn and Joaquín Sorolla, as well as Agustí Querol Subirats, official sculptor to the Spanish government. In Querol's studio, he executed an equestrian portrait of the king, Alfonso XIII, which was soon purchased by the American collector Charles Deering, who, over the next few years would commission or purchase several of Casas paintings.

== Júlia Peraire ==
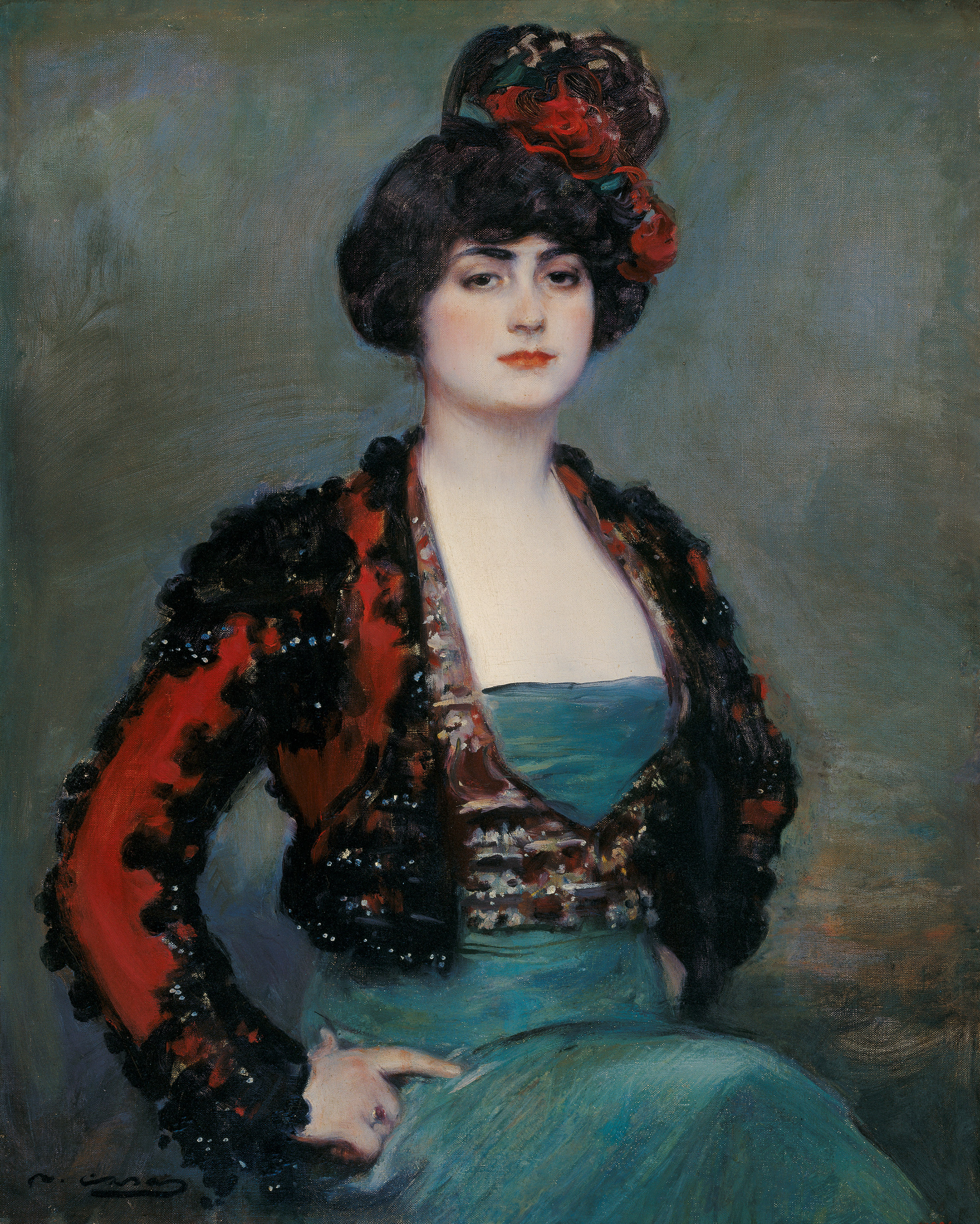
Julia, c. 1915

Increasingly in demand as a portraitist, he settled again for a while in Barcelona. Shortly thereafter he made the acquaintance of a young artist's model named Júlia Peraire, 22 years his junior. He first painted her in 1906 when she was 18. She soon became his favorite model and his lover. His family did not approve of her; they eventually married, but not until 1922.

== Patronage and stardom ==
Casas' mother purchased the monastery of Sant Benet de Bages in 1907 and hired Puig i Cadafalch to restore it. Casas would spend much time there, and would repeatedly depict the monastery and its surroundings. Five years later, when his mother died, he inherited the monastery.

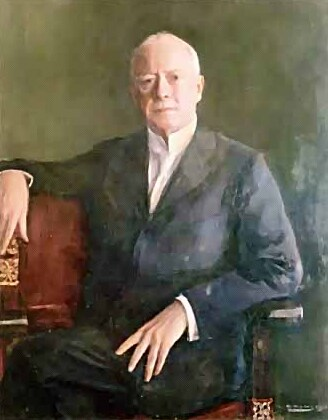
Casas portrait of Charles Deering, c. 1914

In 1908 Casas and his now-patron Deering traveled through Catalonia. Deering purchased a former hospital in Sitges to transform it into a sometime residence. Miquel Utrillo dubbed it Marycel. Later that year, Casas began a six-month journey to Cuba and the United States at Deering's invitation. During this time, he executed a dozen oil portraits and over thirty charcoal drawings of Deering's friends and associates.

Returning to Spain in April 1909, he put on solo shows in both Barcelona and Madrid. At the Fayanç Català gallery in Barcelona, he displayed 200 charcoal sketches, which he then donated to the Museu de Barcelona. His show in Madrid was at the Ministry of Tourism, and featured portraits of the city's leading figures, including the king.

His life continued in this vein for some time. In 1910 executed a painting of the funeral of his friend the art critic and novelist Raimon Casellas, who had committed suicide the previous year shortly after Barcelona's Setmana Tràgica and, for Deering, painted a second version of La Carga, this time with the prominent foreground figure of a Guardia Civil on foot rather than on horseback. Over the remaining years before World War I he traveled extensively in Spain and Europe, sometimes alone and sometimes with Deering, visiting Vienna, Budapest, Munich, Paris, the Netherlands, Madrid, and Galicia. He continued to have major exhibits in Spain and France. In 1913 he acquired an architecturally notable home in Barcelona, a tower on Carrer de Sant Gervasi (now Carrer de les Carolines) in the Sant Gervasi neighborhood; in 1915, he, Rusiñol, and Clarassó exhibited together in the Sala Parés, celebrating the 25th anniversary of their first joint exhibition there.

== Tamarit and after ==
In 1916, Casas and Deering traveled to Tamarit in Lérida. Deering purchased the entire village, and placed Casas in charge of the project of restoring it. Several years later, in 1924, he would return to Tamarit to paint numerous landscapes. Also in 1916, Deering purchased a house in Sitges, known as Can Xicarrons (now a museum), and the magazine Vell i Nou dedicated an issue to Casas. Up until this time, Casas had kept his distance from the battles of World War I, but in 1918 he visited the front; he painted a self-portrait wearing a military cape.

Casas, Rusiñol, and Clarasó resumed regular annual joint exhibitions at Sala Parés in 1921; these continued until Rusiñol's death in 1931. However, that year he had a falling out with his friend Utrillo over Maricel Casas's close association with Deering; the breach was never healed. In 1922, Casas finally married Júlia Peraire, and in 1924 she came along with him on a trip to the United States, during which he once again made portraits of the rich and famous.

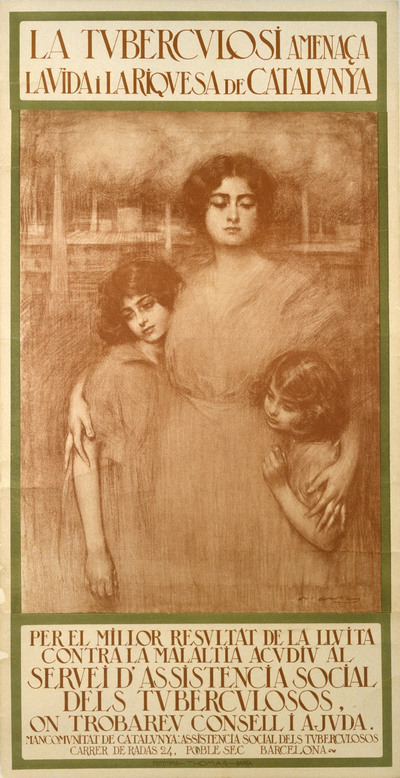
Anti-tuberculosis poster, 1929. The heading is in Catalan and reads "Tuberculosis threatens the life and richness of Catalonia".

By the 1920s, Casas had fallen far away from the avant-gardiste tendencies of his youth. If anything, his work from this period looks like of an academic painter of an earlier time than his work of the 1890s. He continued to paint landscapes and portraits, as well as an anti-tuberculosis poster and others, but by the time of his death in 1932, shortly after the emergence of the Second Spanish Republic, he was already more a figure of the past.

== Death ==
Casas contracted tuberculosis, a deadly, wide-spread disease of the time, and after a protracted, months-long illness he died on 29 February 1932 at his home on Carrer Descartes in the Sant Gervasi neighborhood of Barcelona, aged 66. His tuberculosis poster was published 3 years before his death. His grave is in Montjuïc Cemetery in Barcelona.

== Selected works ==
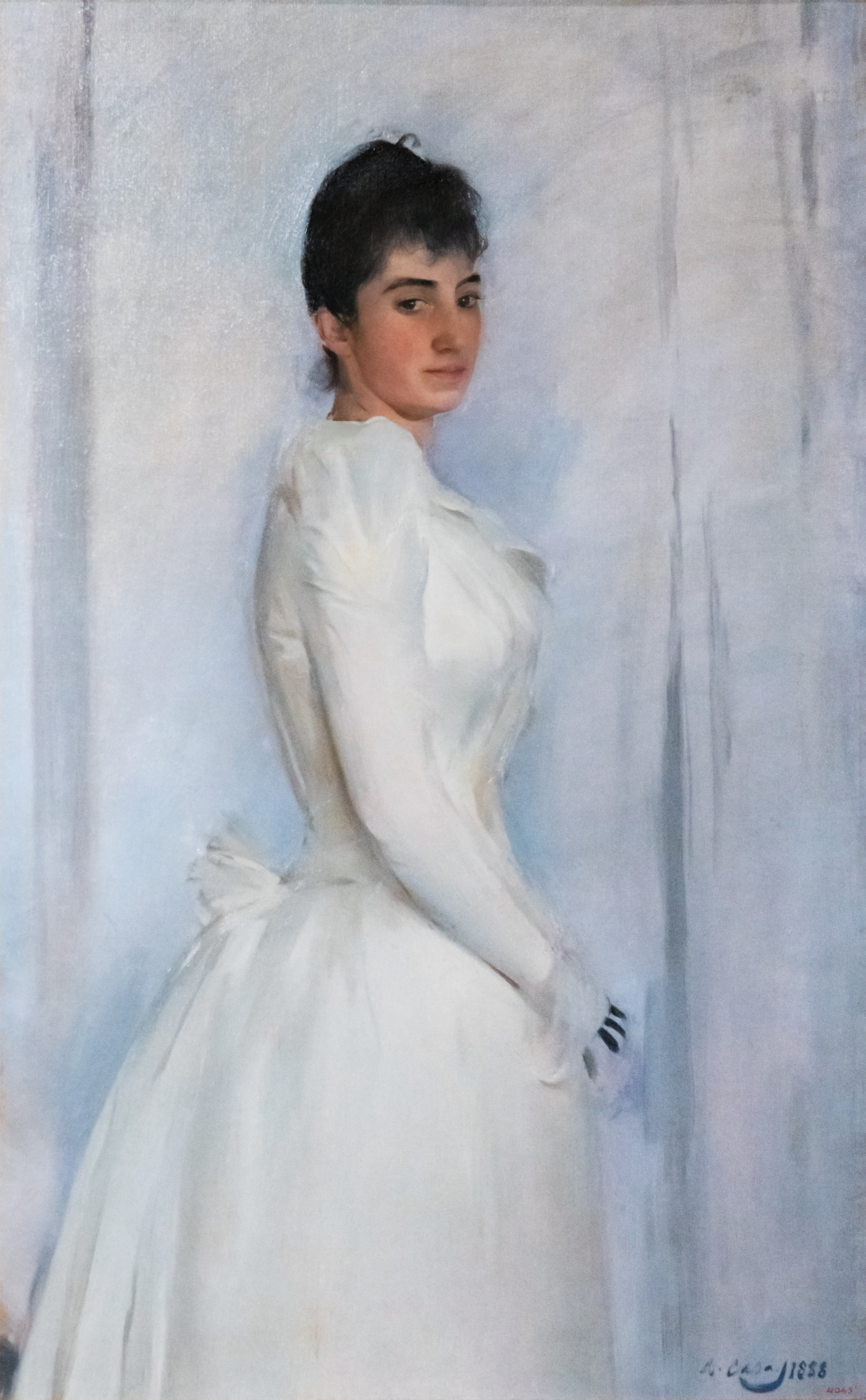
Portrait of Montserrat Carbó, 1888

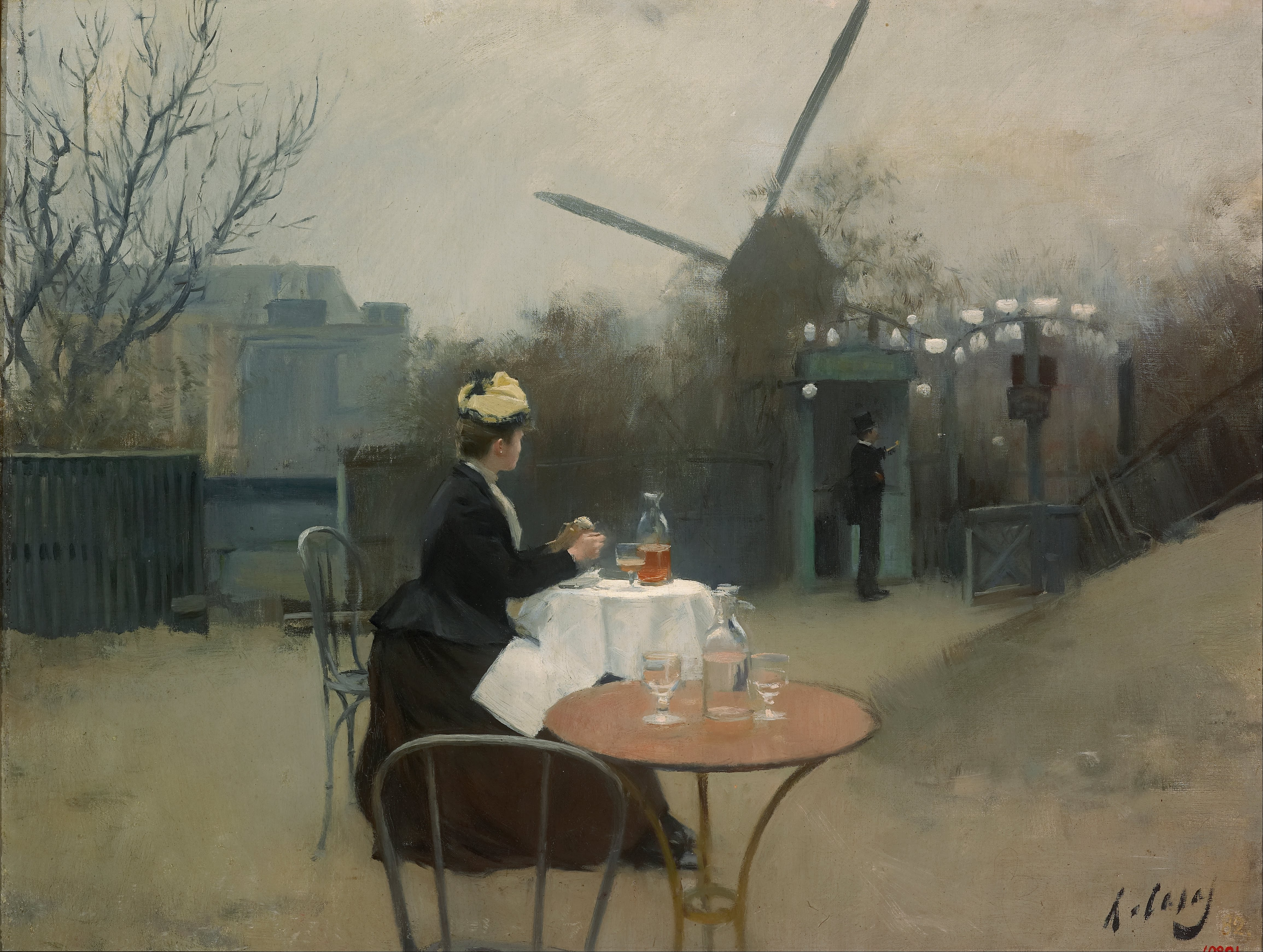
Plein air, c. 1890–91

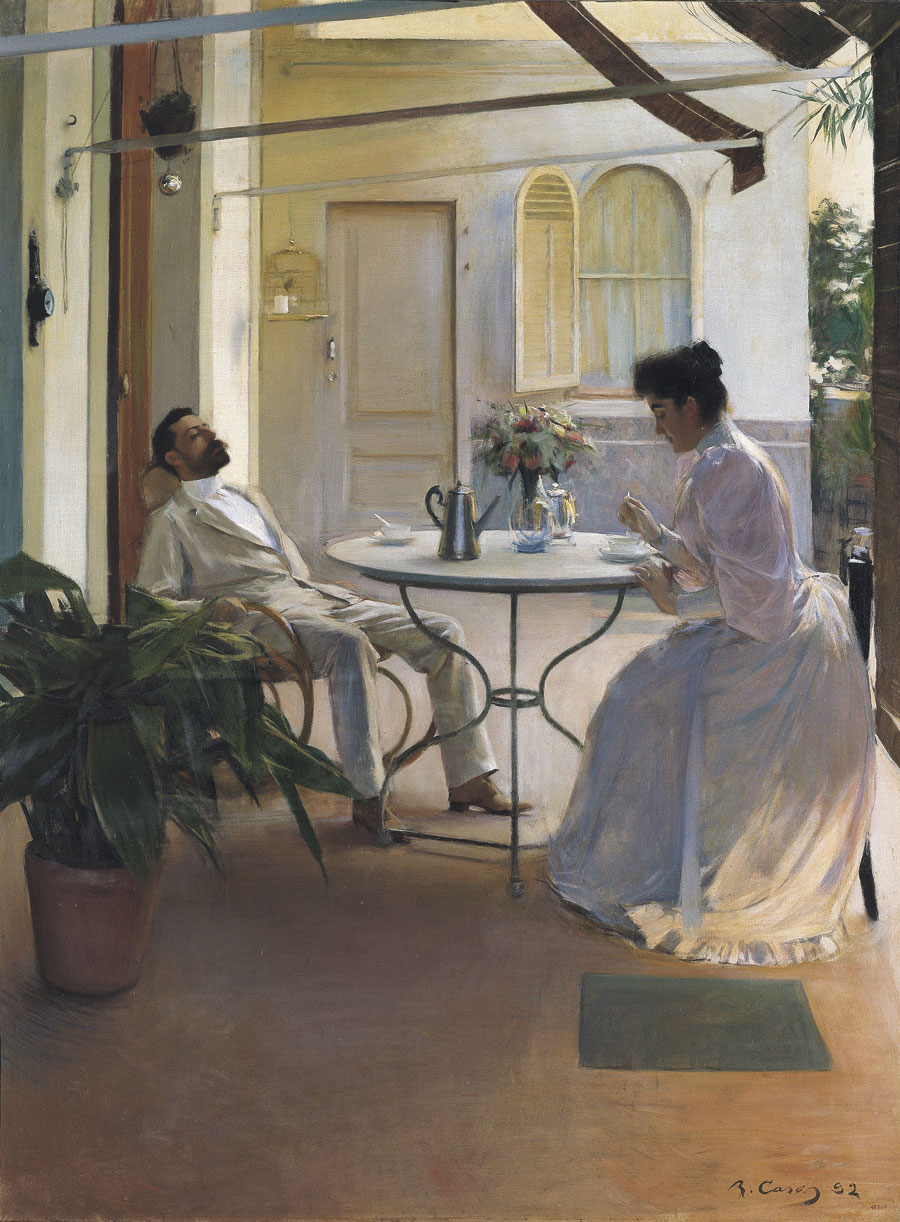
Open Air Interior, 1892 (Ramon's sister Montserrat and his brother-in-law Eduardo Nieto)

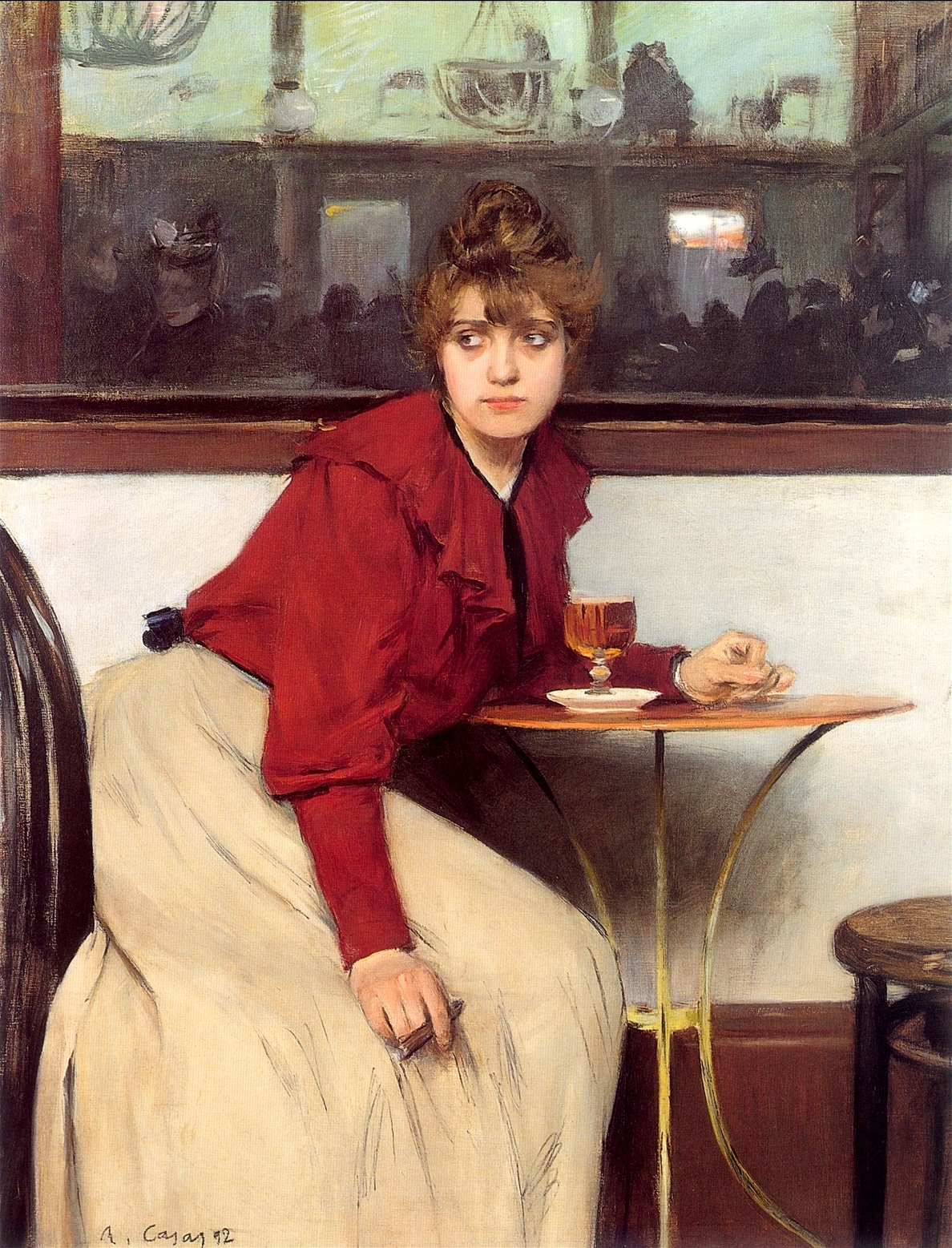
Au Moulin de la Galette, 1892

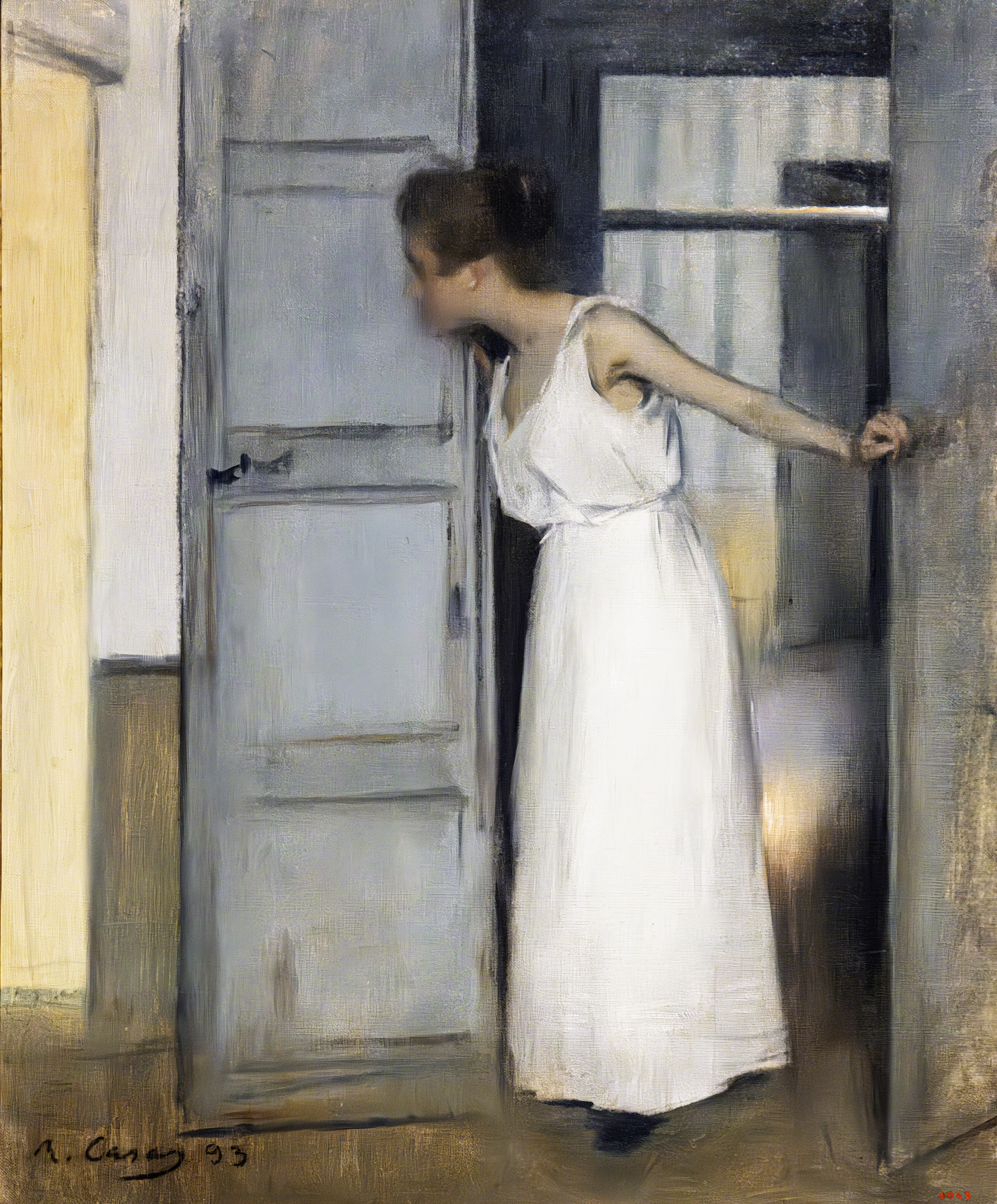
Over My Dead Body, 1893

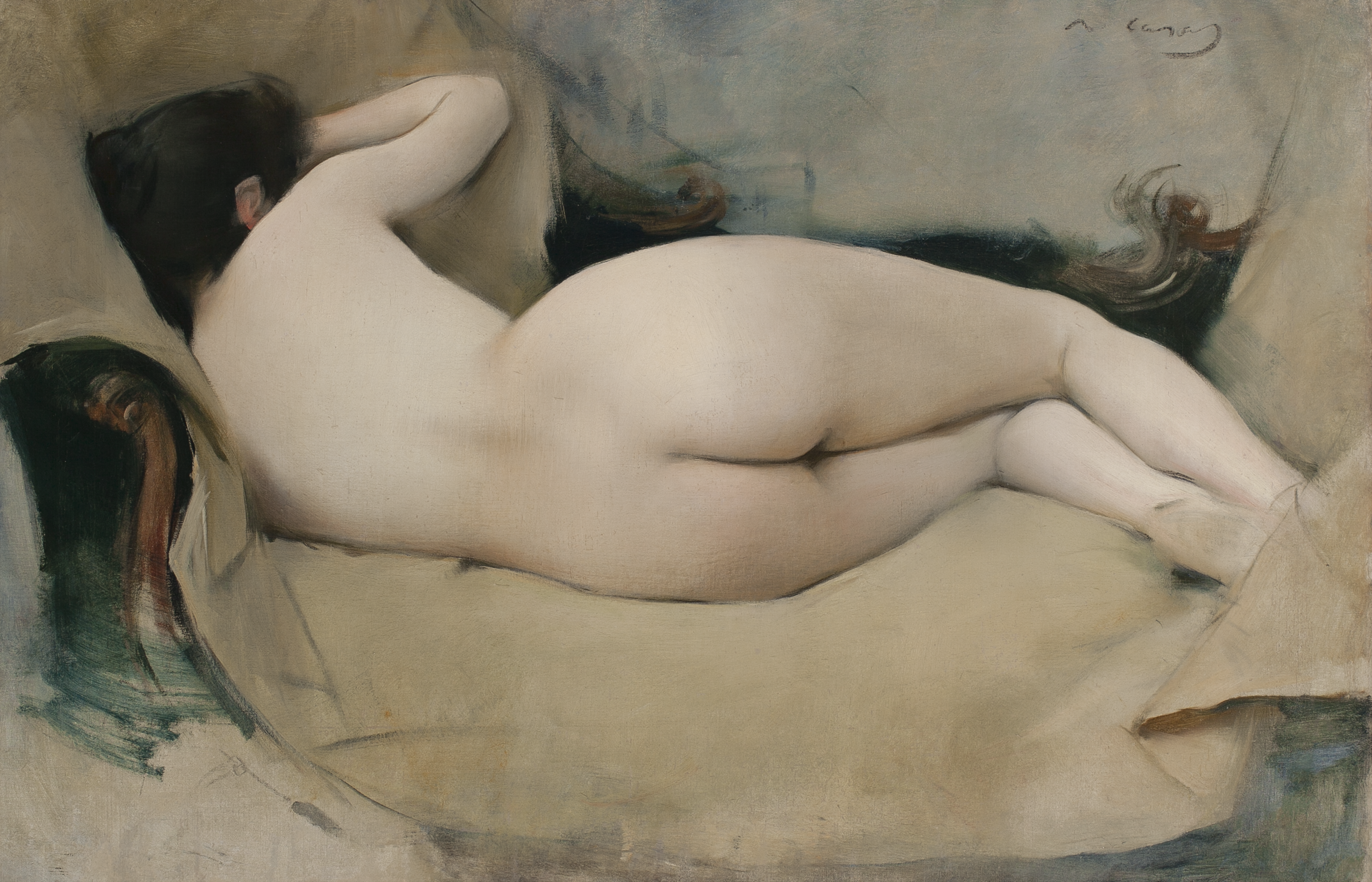
Female Nude, 1894

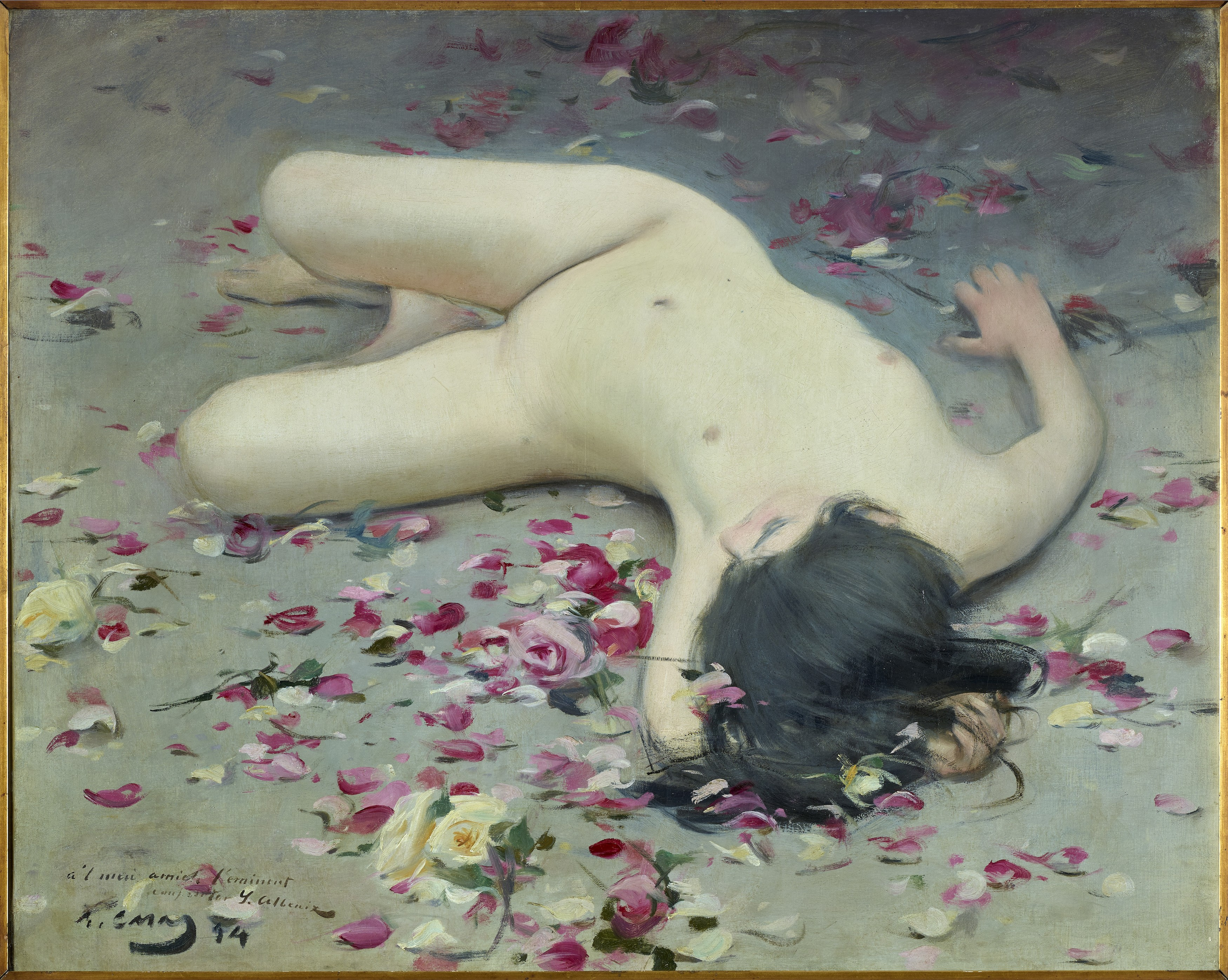
Leafless Flowers (es), 1894

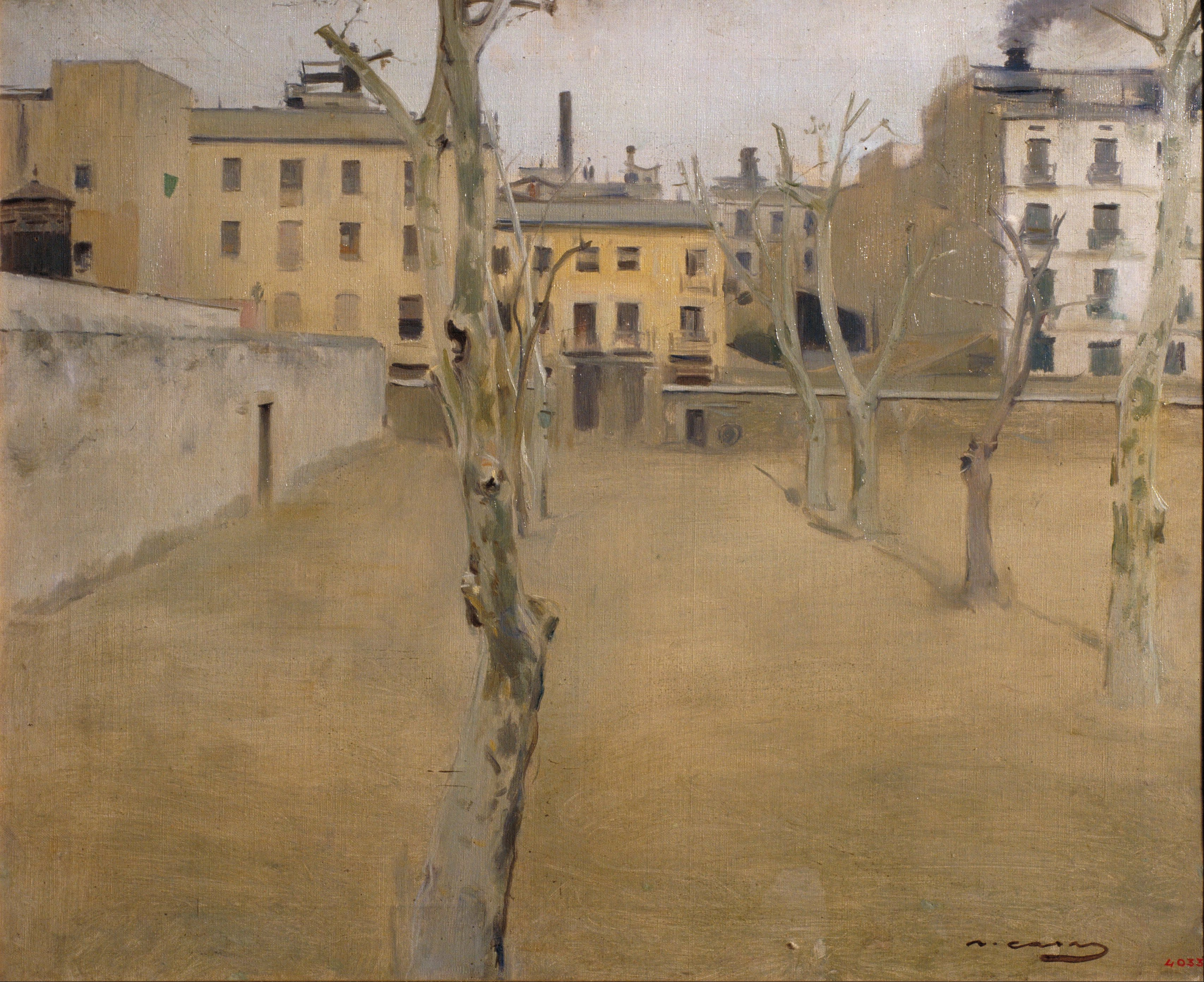
Courtyard of the old Barcelona prison (Courtyard of the 'lambs'), c. 1894

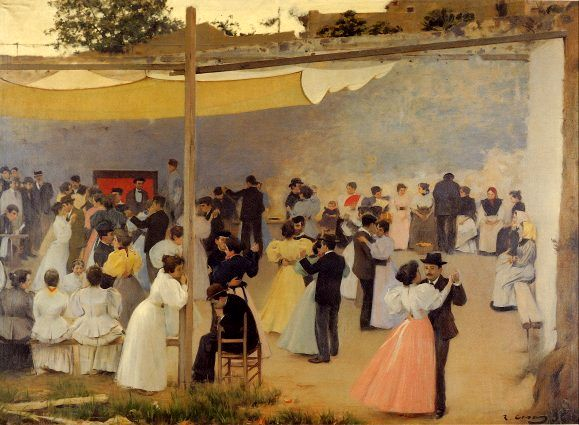
At the ball, 1896

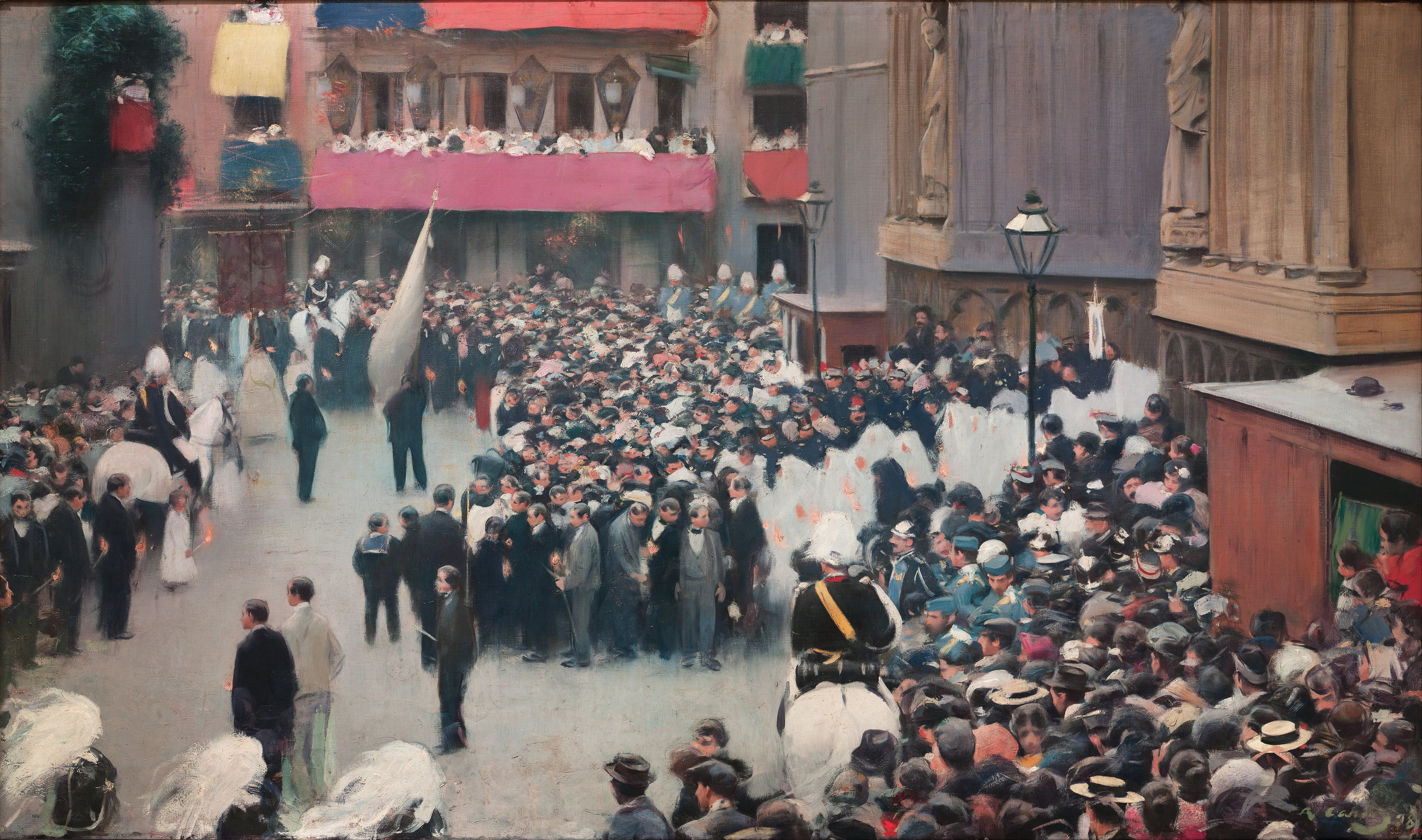
The Corpus Christi Procession Leaving the Church of Santa Maria del Mar, 1896-98

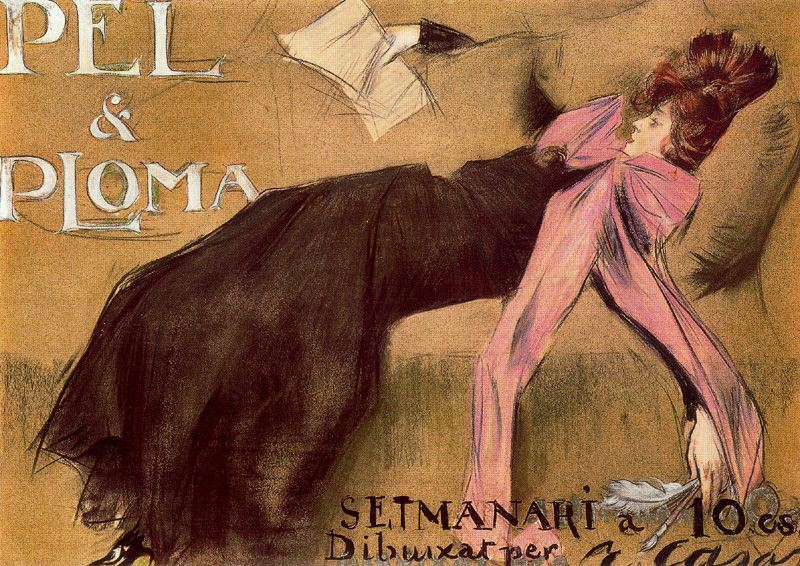
Decadente, 1899

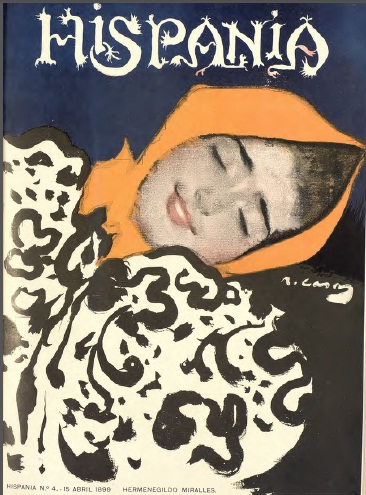
Cover of Hispania magazine no. 4

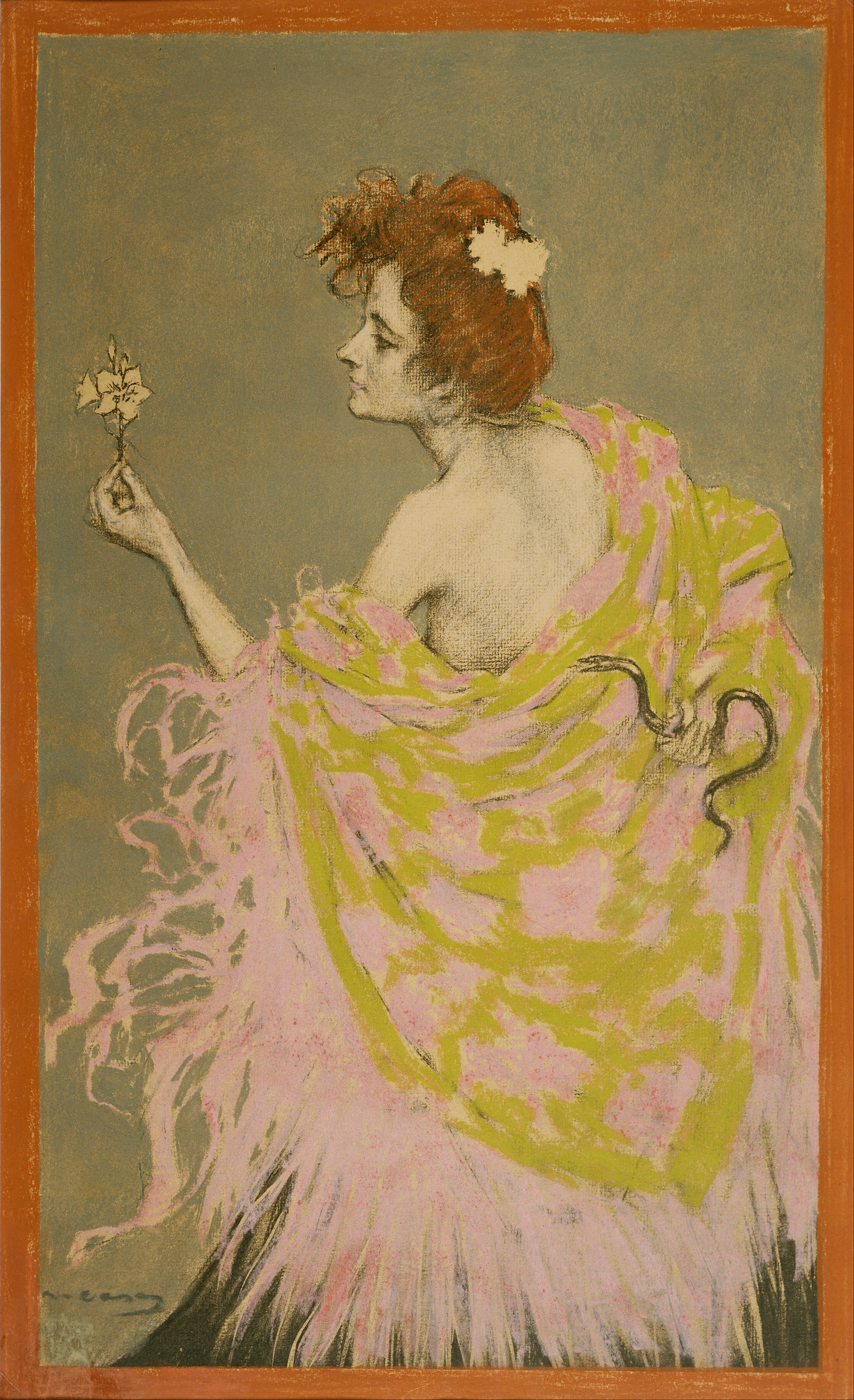
Design for the poster 'Sífilis', 1900, charcoal and pastel on paper

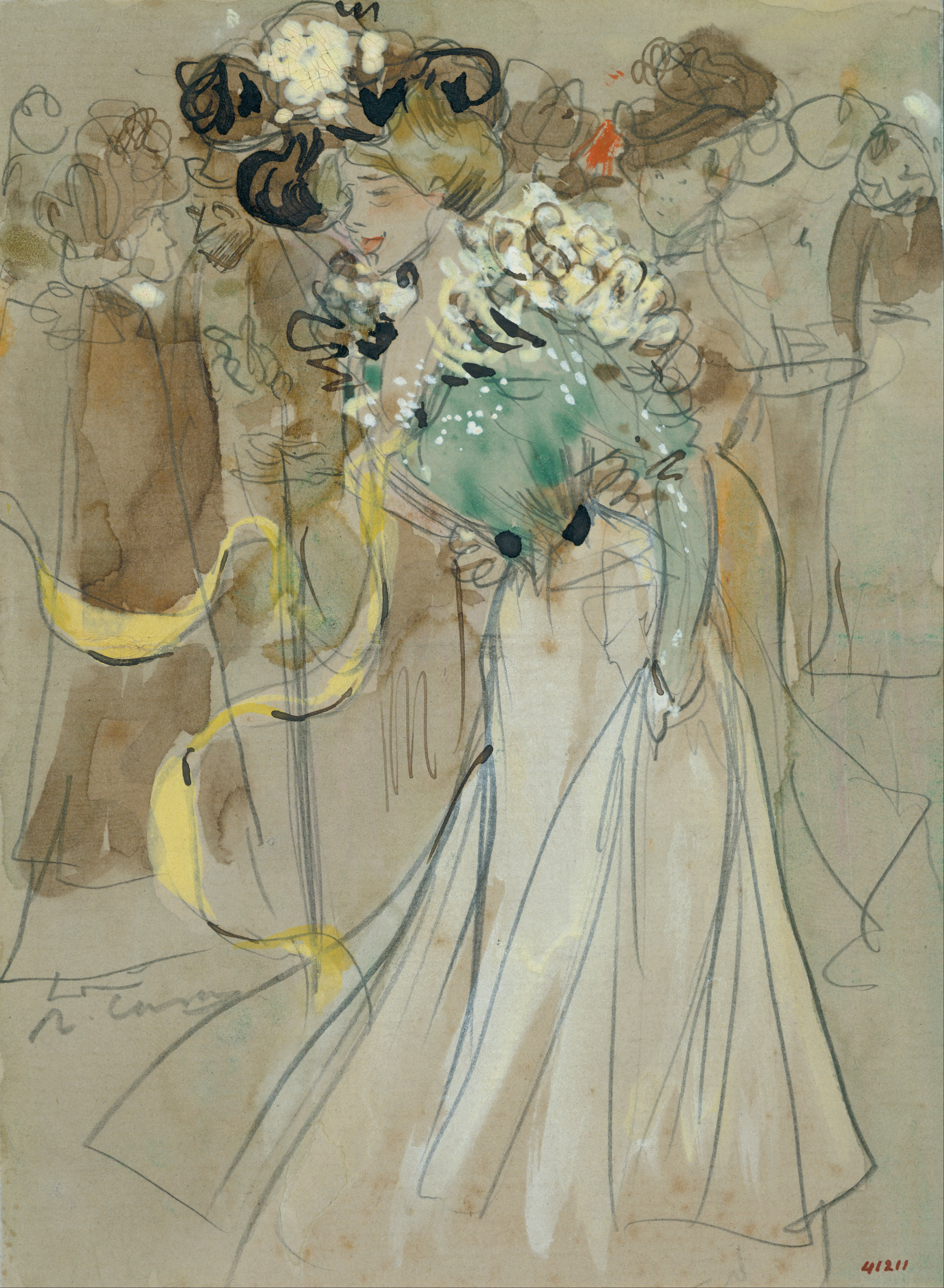
Celebrations in Toulon, 1900

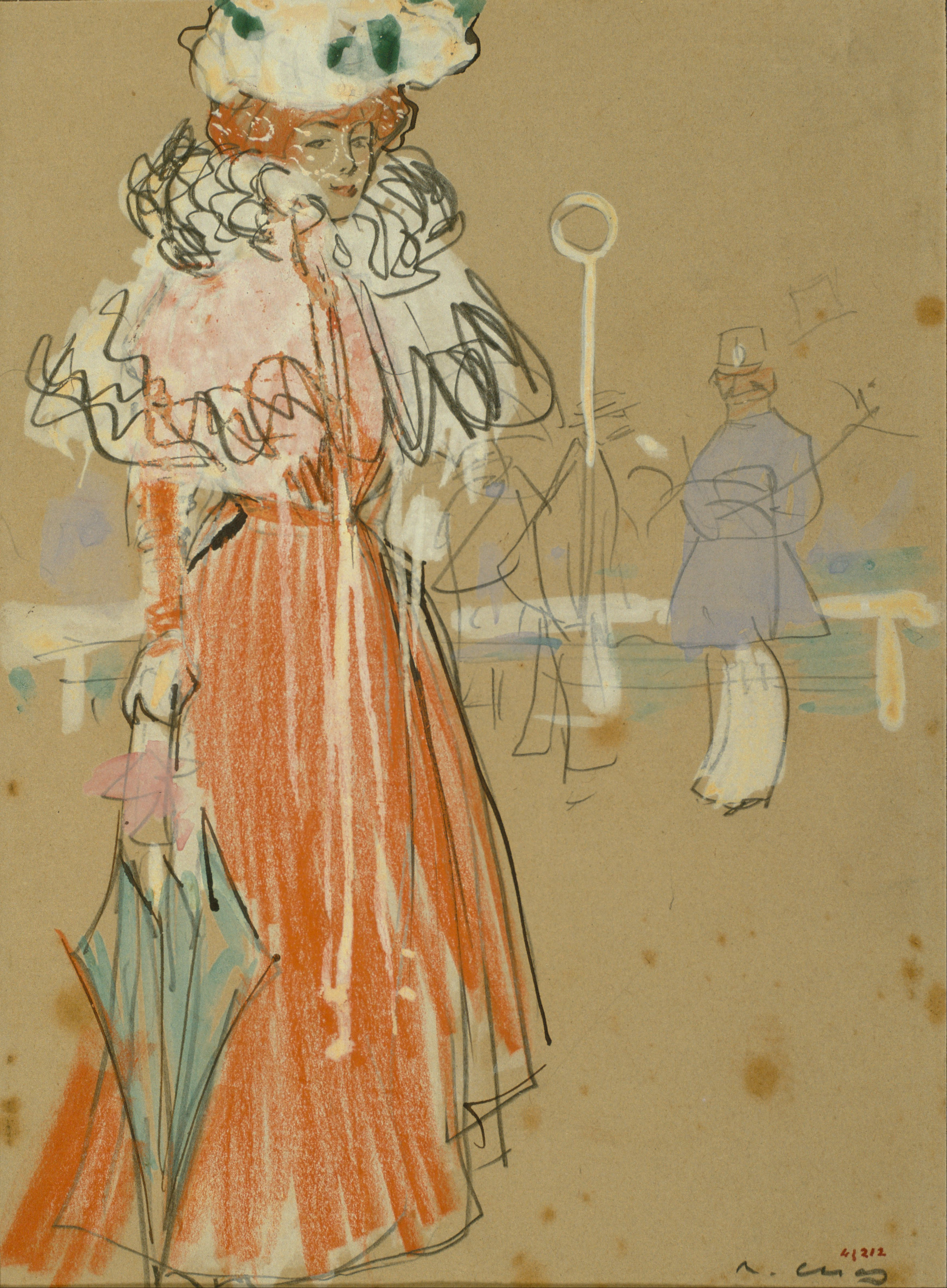
Female Figure in Red, c. 1900

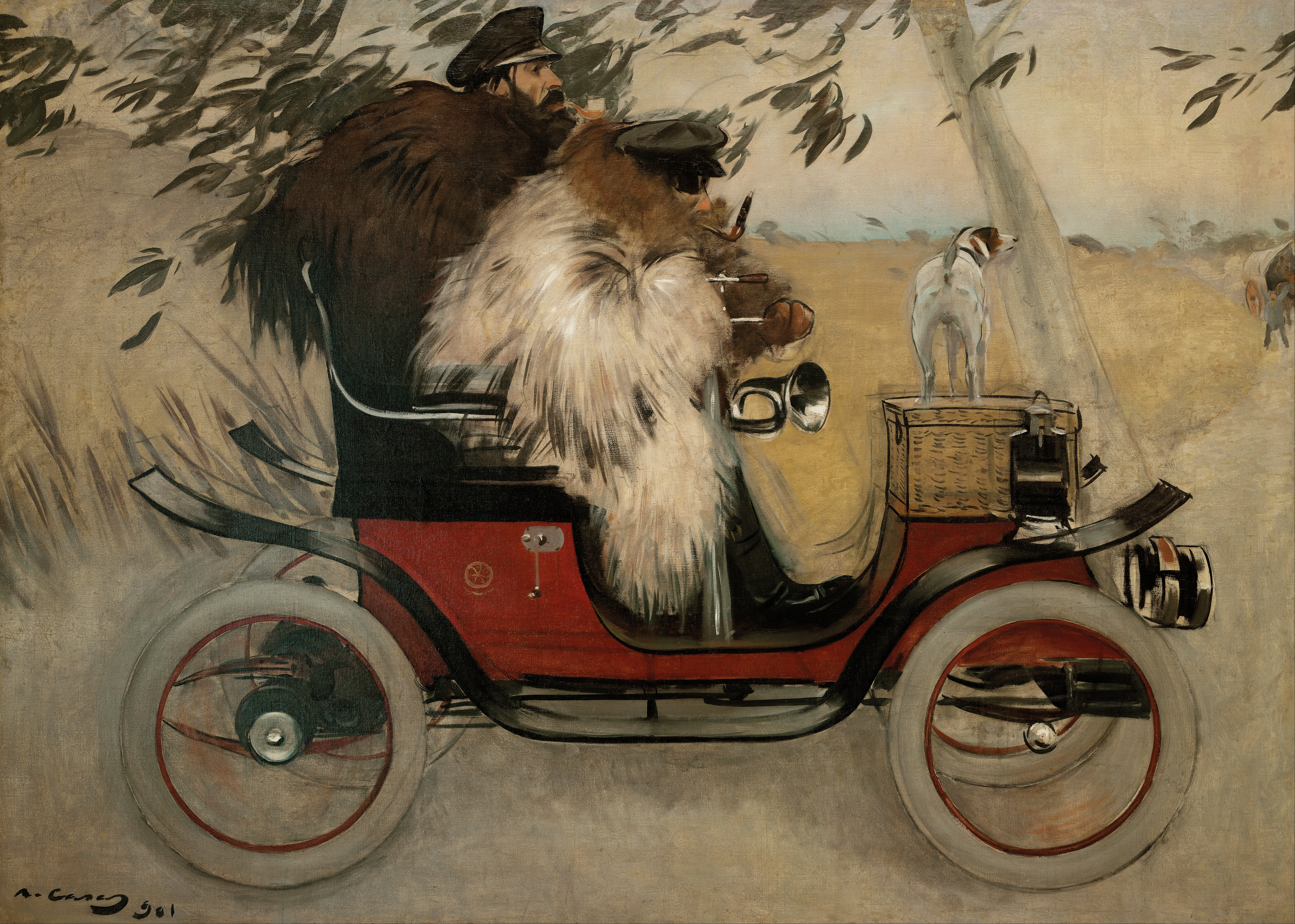
Ramón Casas and Pere Romeu in an Automobile, 1901

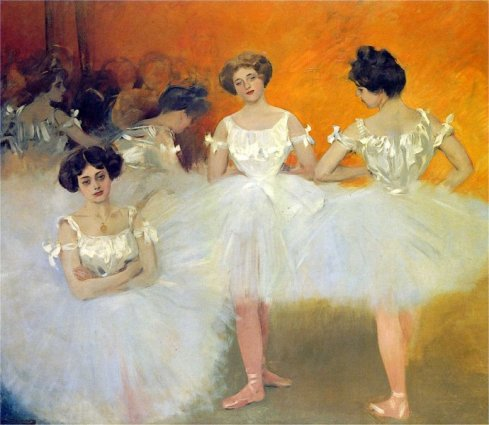
Ballerinas, 1901–02

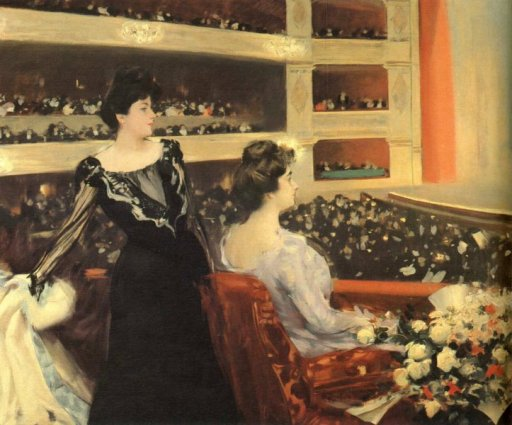
Opera, 1901–02

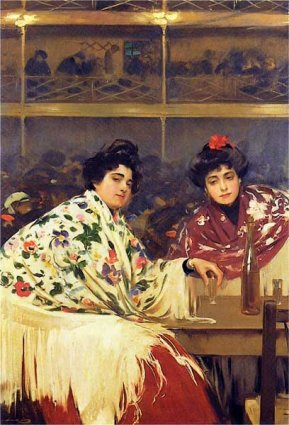
Cafe Concert, c. 1901–02

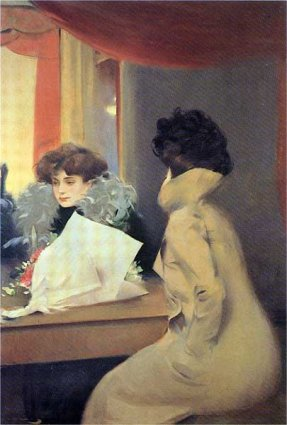
Anteroom of the box, c. 1901–02

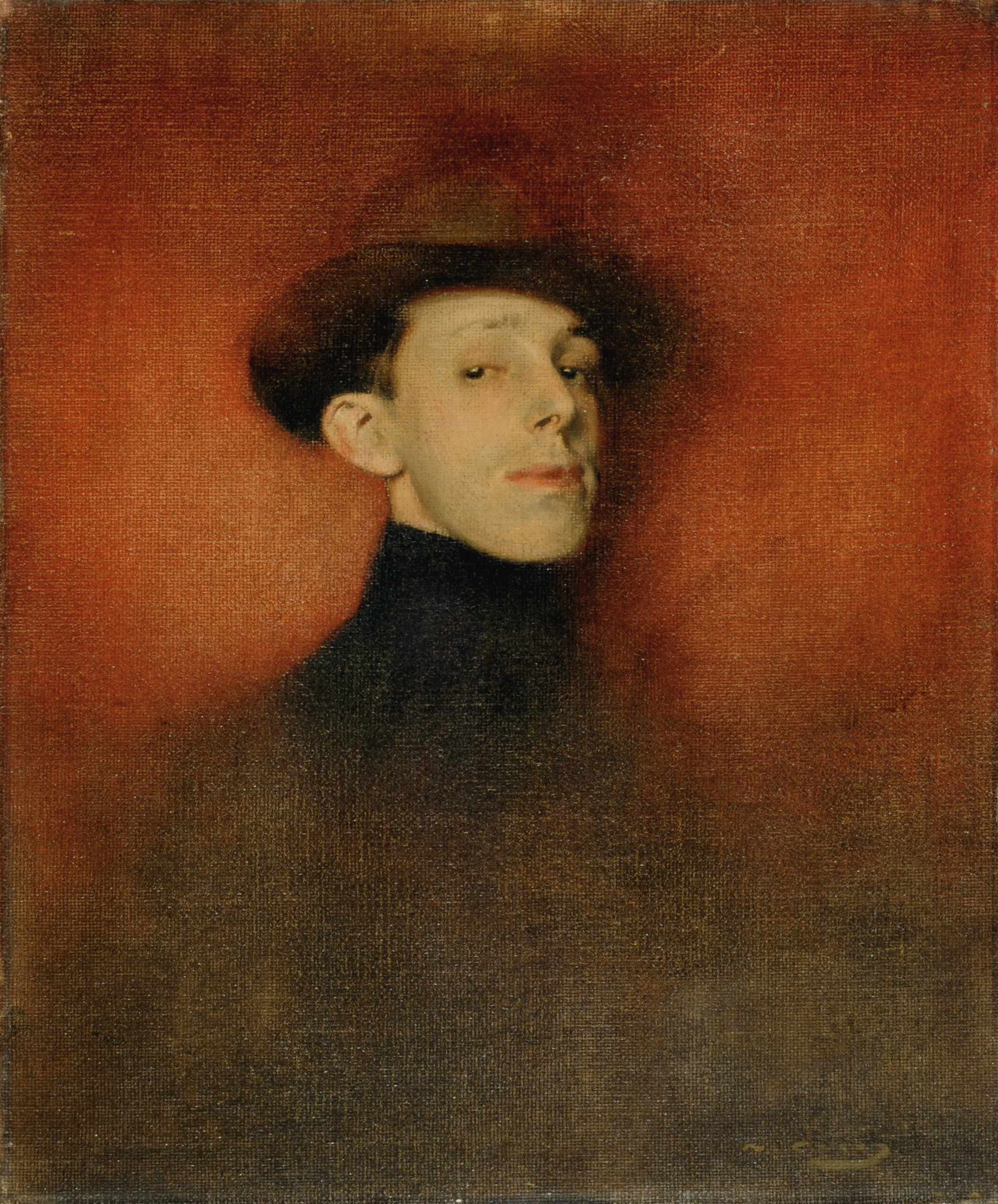
Alfonso XIII, King of Spain, 1904

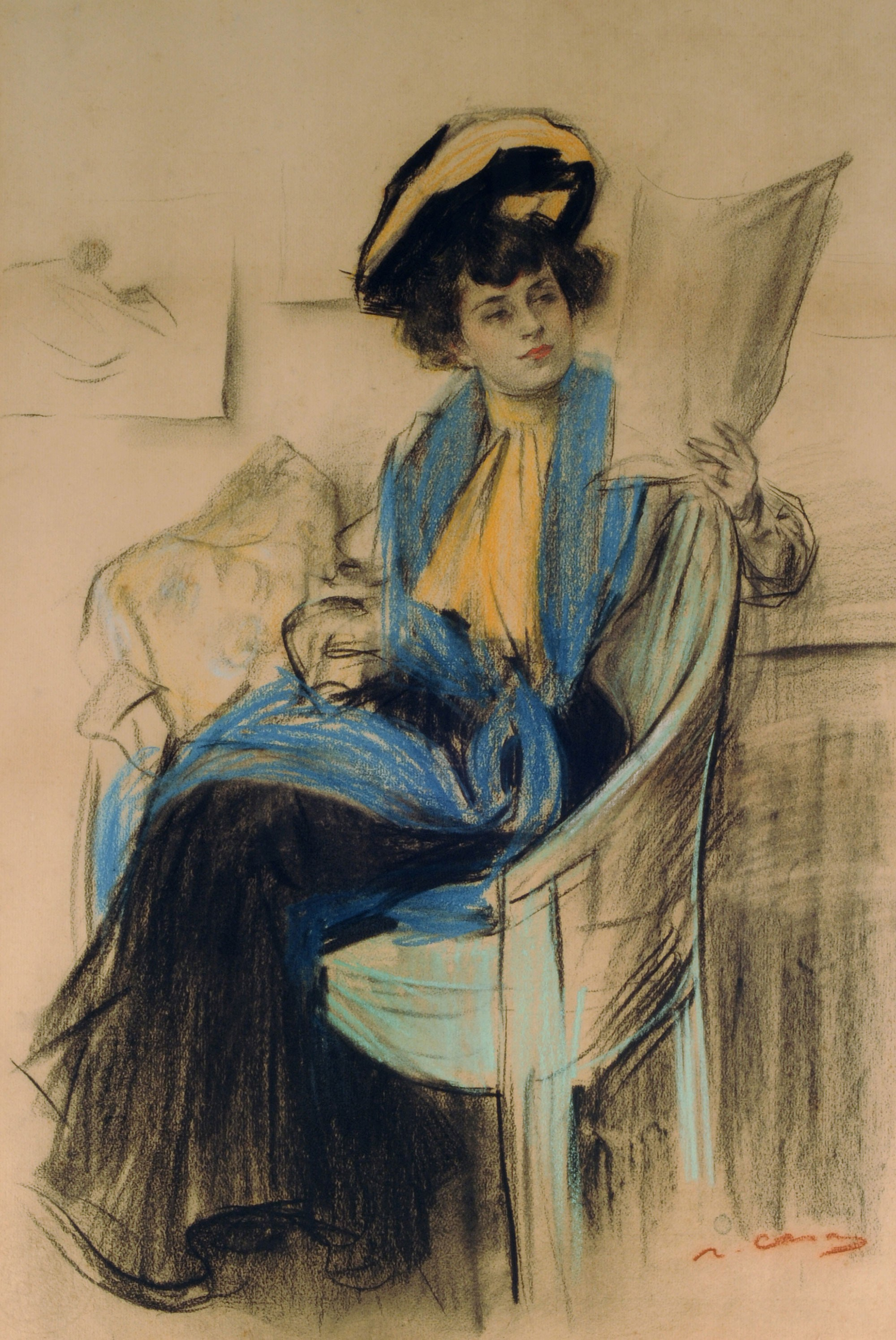
Mademoiselle Clo Clo, pastel
