= The Corpus Christi Procession Leaving the Church of Santa Maria del Mar =

Painting by Ramon Casas

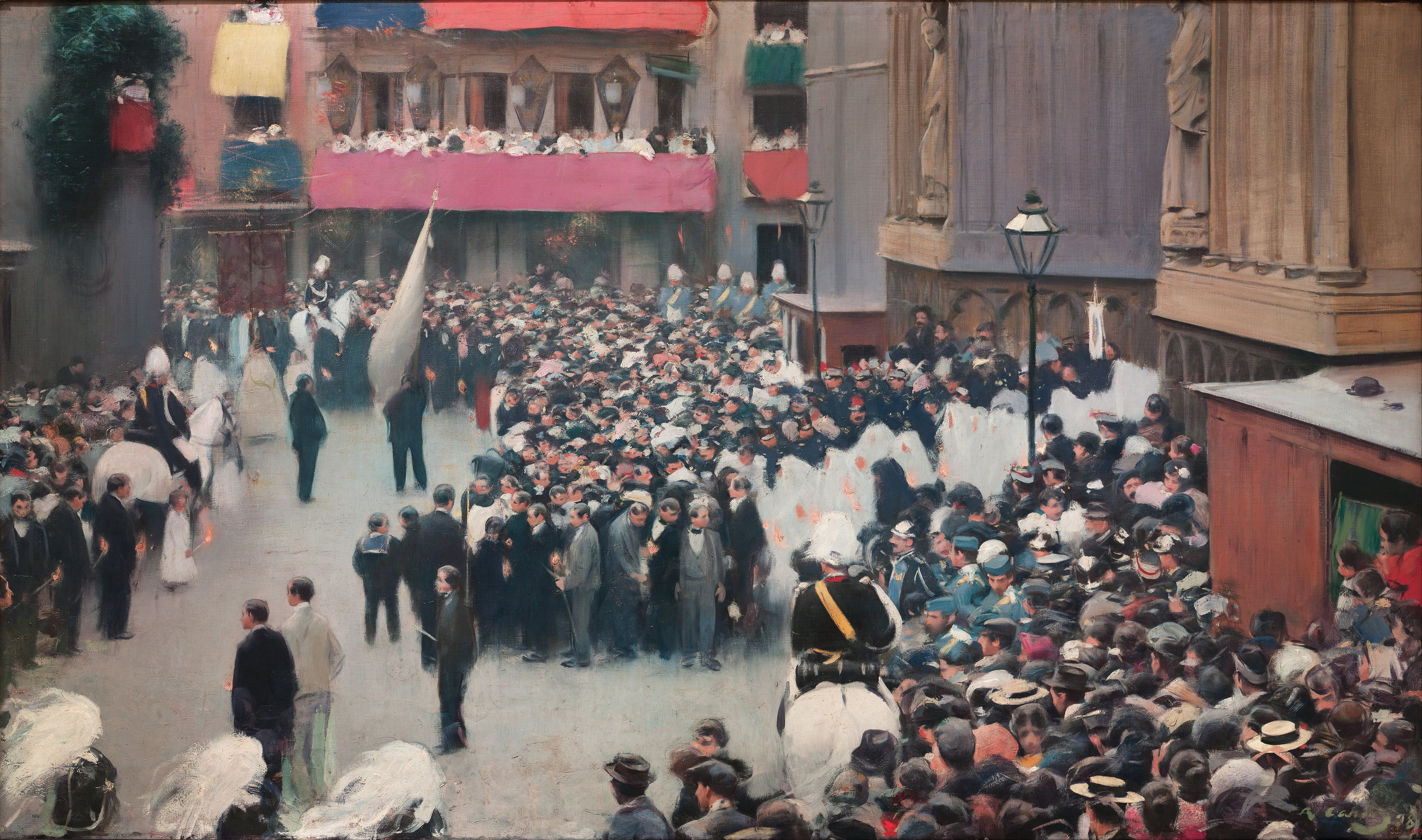
- Artist: Ramon Casas
- Year: 1896–1898
- Medium: Oil painting
- Dimensions: 115.5 cm × 196 cm (45.5 in × 77 in)
- Location: Museu Nacional d'Art de Catalunya, Barcelona

The Corpus Christi Procession Leaving the Church of Santa Maria del Mar is an oil painting by the Spanish artist Ramon Casas painted in 1898 in Barcelona and currently in the Museu Nacional d'Art de Catalunya in Barcelona.

In 1896, an attack was carried out against the Corpus Christi procession, which had left the Church of Santa Maria del Mar of Barcelona, killing twelve people and creating panic in the city.

Casas chose to paint the time of departure of the procession from the church, before passing on the Canvis Nous street, where the attack took place.

== Style ==
As in his work Garrote vil (Garrotte), the scene is framed from a perspective of height and the painter delights in the play of colors and festive banners hung from balconies and the veils of girls dressed in their first Communion gowns accompanying the procession, thus alluding in an elliptical way to the chaos and despair that will occur shortly after and what they are unaware of. The technique uses very loose, rapid brushwork and lightly loaded material.
