= Over Her Dead Body =

Over Her Dead Body may refer to:

- Over Her Dead Body (1990 film), American black comedy, a/k/a Enid Is Sleeping
- Over Her Dead Body (2008 film), American romantic comedy fantasy
- Over Her Dead Body (2022 film), Nigerian family comedy
- Over Her Dead Body: Death, Femininity and the Aesthetic, 1992 literary book by Swiss/German/American cultural critic Elisabeth Bronfen

== See also ==
- Over My Dead Body (disambiguation)
- Over Your Dead Body (disambiguation)
