= Over Your Dead Body =

Over Your Dead Body may refer to:

- Over Your Dead Body (2014 film), a Japanese supernatural horror drama
- Over Your Dead Body (2026 film), an American action thriller film
- Over Your Dead Body (novel), a 2016 horror novel by American author Dan Wells

== See also ==
- Over My Dead Body (disambiguation)
- Over Her Dead Body (disambiguation)
