= Teresa Mariani =

Italian actress (1868–1914)

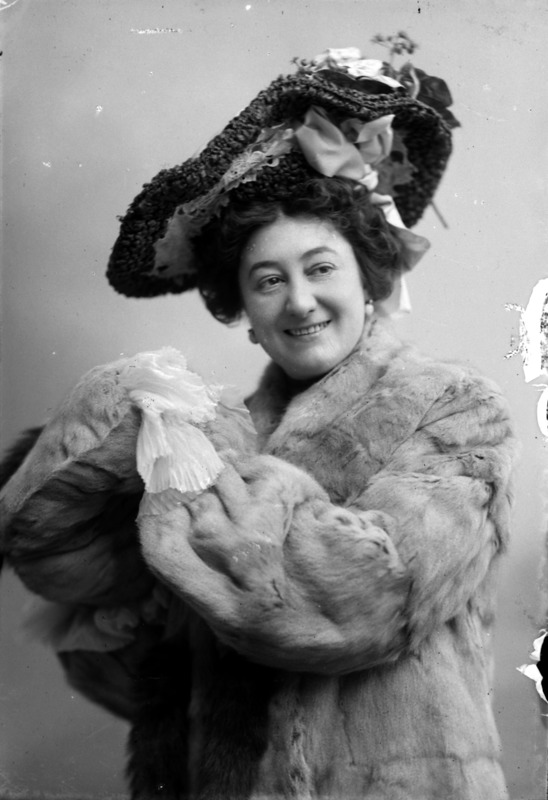
- Born: 24 October 1868; Florence, Kingdom of Italy
- Died: 1 August 1914 (aged 45); Castelfranco Veneto, Kingdom of Italy
- Other name: Teresina Mariani-Zampieri
- Occupation: Actress
- Spouse: Vittorio Zampieri

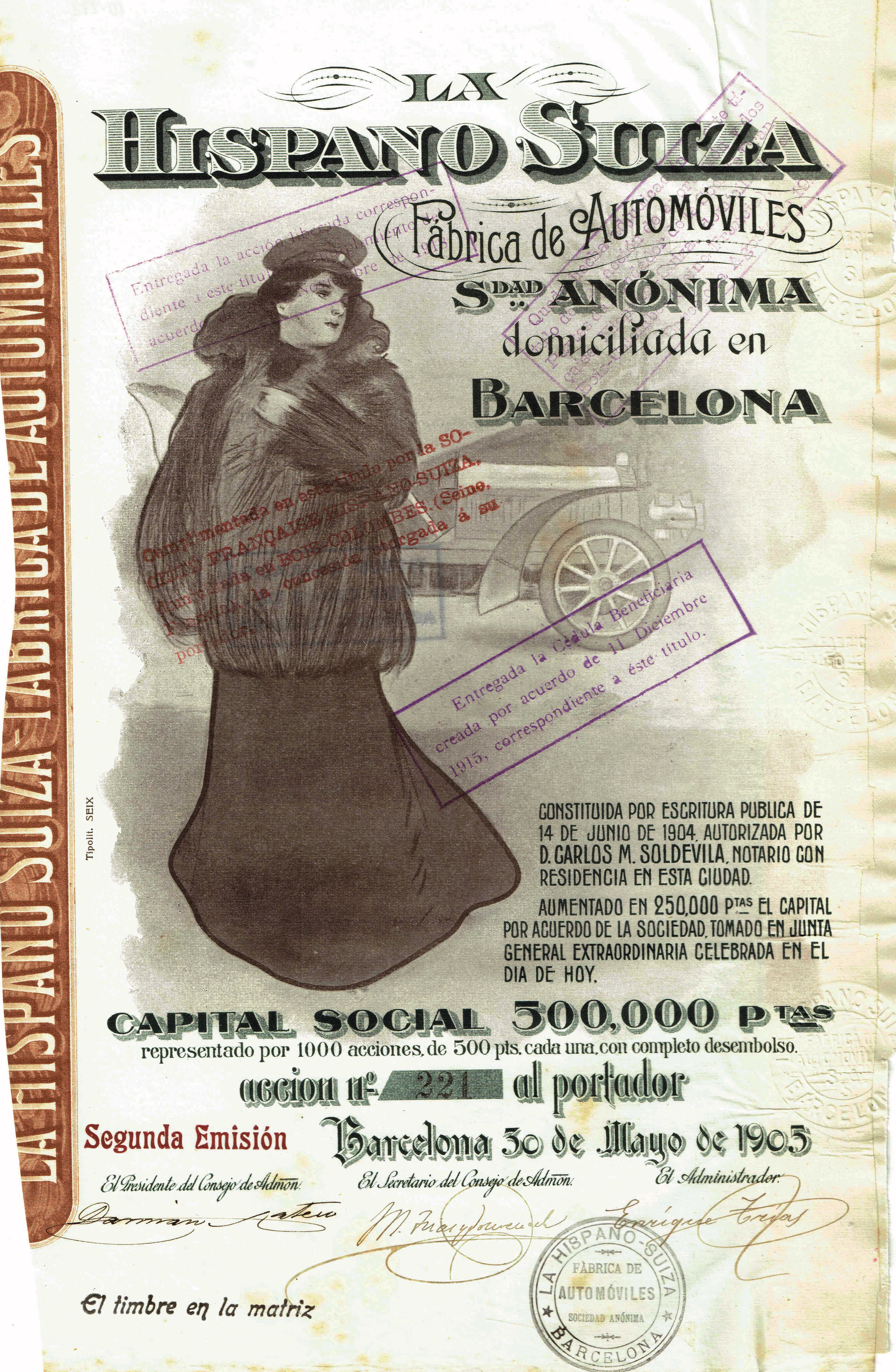
A 1905 share certificate for Hispano Suiza, featuring a portrait of Mariani by Ramon Casas

Teresa Mariani (24 October 1868 – 1 August 1914) was an Italian actress.

== Early life ==
Mariani was born into a family of performers in Florence. She began her acting career as a small child, in a Paris production of Ernest Legouvé's Medea, sharing the stage with Adelaide Ristori.

== Career ==
Mariani was a comic and dramatic actress who performed in throughout Europe and toured in the Caribbean and South America. She worked in various theatre companies, including those run by Ermete Novelli and Cesare Rossi. She was head actress with her own touring company from 1894 to 1908, with the other members including her husband Vittorio Zampieri, Achille Majeroni, Maria Melato, Ernesto Sabbatini, and Arturo Falconi. In 1898, when she starred in her company's production of A Doll's House in Montevideo, she became the first actress to play Ibsen's Nora in Uruguay. She sat for a portrait by Spanish painter Ramon Casas, who also used her image to illustrate the share certificates for Hispano Suiza Fábrica de Automóviles SA.

Mariani also appeared in a silent film, Situazione comica (1909). A few months before her death in 1914, she performed in classical Greek dramas in Verona with Gualtiero Tumiati.

== Personal life and death ==
Mariani was married to fellow actor Vittorio Zampieri. She died from heart failure in 1914, aged 45 years, in Castelfranco Veneto.
