= Over My Dead Body =

Over my dead body may refer to:

== Art, theater and podcast ==
- Over My Dead Body (Casas), 1893 Catalan painting by Ramon Casas
- Over My Dead Body (play), 1989 American comedy thriller
- Over My Dead Body (podcast), 2019 American two-season true-crime

== Film ==
- Over My Dead Body (1942 film), American comedy mystery
- Over My Dead Body (1995 film), German romantic comedy
- Over My Dead Body, 2007 documentary produced by Vickie Gest
- Over My Dead Body (2012 Canadian film), documentary winner of Prix Jutra
- Over My Dead Body (2012 South Korean film), comic heist social satire
- Over My Dead Body (2023 film), Hong Kong black comedy

== Literature ==
- Over My Dead Body (novel), 1940 Nero Wolfe detective mystery by Rex Stout
- Over My Dead Body (1957) and Over My Dead Body: Forty Years On (1996), memoir books by June Opie

== Music ==
- Over My Dead Body (band), American straight-edge hardcore active from 2000 to 2004
- "Over My Dead Body" (song), opening track on 2011 album Take Care by Drake

== Television ==
- Over My Dead Body (TV series), 1990–91 American detective drama
- "Over My Dead Body", 2011 episode, see Pretty Little Liars (season 2)
- "Over My Dead Body" (Grimm), 2012 episode

== See also ==
- Over Her Dead Body (disambiguation)
- Over Your Dead Body (disambiguation)
- Laconic phrase
- Molon labe
