= Over My Dead Body (Casas) =

Painting by Ramon Casas

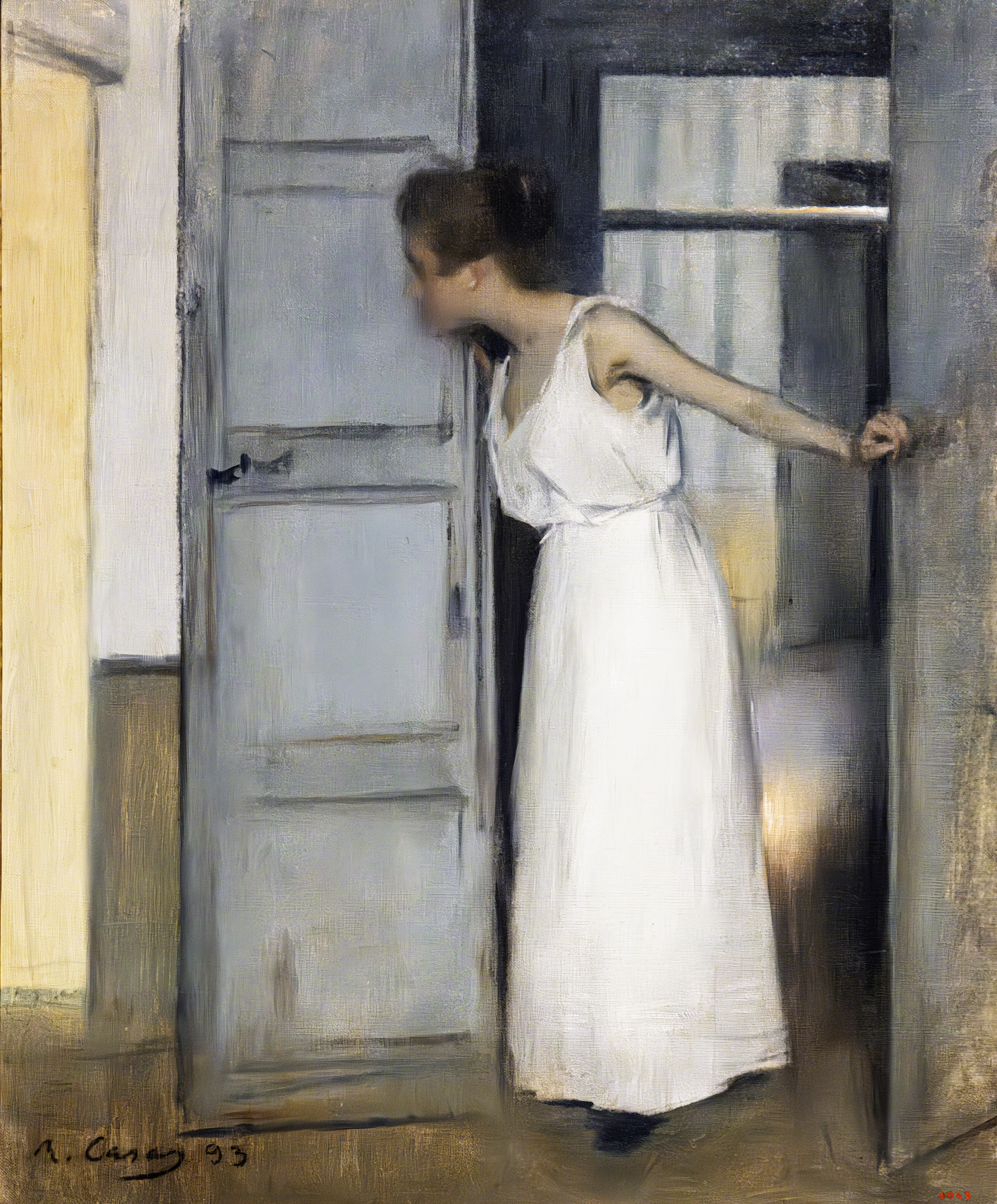
- Artist: Ramon Casas
- Year: 1893
- Medium: Oil on canvas
- Dimensions: 61.5 cm × 50.5 cm (24.25 in × 19 in)
- Location: Museu Nacional d'Art de Catalunya; Barcelona

Over My Dead Body is an oil on canvas painting by Ramon Casas, from 1893. It is held in the National Art Museum of Catalonia, in Barcelona.

== Description ==
At the beginning of the 1890s, Ramon Casas began painting interior scenes with a female figure always present. Over My Dead Body, one of the first of the series, Casas paints a young woman standing between two doorways . Her posture appears to be looking out at someone and preventing them from entering the room. The complexity of the open doors at the far end of the room contribute a mysterious quality to the painting, allowing the viewer to question where this young woman really is.

The painting's original title was replaced for some time with "Summer Study." But Miguel Utrillo changed the title of the painting back to "Over My Dead Body" after a solo exhibition at the Sala Pares in May 1900. The title of the work is listed in Pel & Ploma as "Summer Study."

== Exhibition ==
Exhibition history:

- Segona Exposicio de Ramon Casas, Barcelona, Sala Parés, 25/5-11/6/1900.
- Homenatge a Ramon Casas, Barcelona, Palau de Bellas Arts, Reial Circol Artistic, 6/1930.
- Exposicion Ramon Casas, Barcelona, Palau de la Virreina, 12/1982.
- Tresors de Barcelone. Picasso, Miró, Dalí et leur temps, Lausanne, Fondation de l'Hermitage, 10/10-28/11/1986.
- Pintura, dibuix i obra grafica del Museu d'Art Modern de Barcelona (Finals del s. XIX primers del XX). Excola Catalana (trad.rus)", Moscow, Academy of Fine Arts, 6-7/1987;Leningrad, Fine Arts Academy, 7-8/1987.
- El espacio privado, Madrid, Sala Julio Gonzalex, 10-12/1990.
- Ramon Casas. El pintor del Modernisme, Barcelona, Museu Nacional d'Art de Catalunya, 31/1-1/04/2001; Madrid, Fundació Cultural Mapfre Vida, 11/4-17/6/2001.
- Gaudi e il modernismo catalano, Milan, 2003, p. 57, cat. s/num., fig..
- El Modernismo. De Sorolla a Picasso, 1880–1918, Lausanne, Fondation de l´Hermitage, 27/01/2011-29/05/2011
- "Ramon Casas. El pintor del modernisme", Madrid, Fundacion Cultural Mapfre Vida, 10/04/2001-17/06/2001
- "Ramon Casas. El pintor del modernisme¨", Barcelona, MNAC;Madrid, Dundacio Cultural Mapfre Vida, 31/01/2003-17/06/2001
- "Ramon Casas. El pintor del modernisme", Barcelona, MNAC; 31/01/2001-01/04/2001
- "Gaudi e il modernismo catalano" (Gaudi i el moderisme catala). MNAC, Roma, Chiostro del Bramante, 20/01/2003-29/02/2004

== Bibliography ==
- Catàleg de l'exposició dels originals que serveixen per a l'il.lustracio de Pel & Ploma, disbuixats per R. Casas, d'una sèrie cronològica de quadres a l'oli d'altres obres del mateix author, Pel & Ploma, Barcelona, 26/5/1900, 50–52, car.num. 76.
- Pel & Ploma, Barcelona, 8/1901, III, 79, p. 1.
- Cataleg de les obres exposades en el Saló de la Reina Regent del Palau de Belles Arts en homenatgea *l'il.lustre pintor Ramon Casas, Barcelona, 1930, cat. num. 17 (exhibition catalogue).
- Jorda, J. M., "Ramon Casas", Barcelona, 1931, fig. 61
- "Ramon Casas", Barcelona, 1982, p. 143, cat. num. 27, fig, p. 43 (cataleg d´expositio).
- "Tresors de Barcelona. Picasso, Miro, Dali et leur temps", Lausanne, 1986, p. 162, cat. num. 3, fig. num. 3
- "Cataleg de Pintura segles XIX i XX. Fons del Museu d´Art Modern", 2. Vol., Barcelona, 1987, I, p. 266 cat. num, 488, fig.
- "Pintura Catalana del Museu dÁrt Modern de Barcelona. (Finals s. XIX principis del XX). Escola Catalana (trad.rus)" Moscu, 1987, (cataleg d´exposicio)
- "El espacio privado", Madrid, 1990, p. 248, fig. p. 249 (cataleg d´exposicio)
- LORD, C.B., ¨"Point and Counterpoinr: Ramon Casas in Paris and Barcelona 1866–1909", Michigan, The University of Michigan, II, 407, fig. 127 (tesi doctoral inedita).
- COLL, I., "Ramon Casas. Una vida dedicada a lárt. Cataleg raonat de l´obra pictorica", Barcelona, 1999, p. 318, cat. num. 230, fig.
- COLL, I., "Una vida dedicada a lárt. Ramon Casas. Catalogo razonado, Barcelona, 2002, p. 231, cat. num. 226, fig.
- "Ramon Casas. El pintor del Modernisme, Barcelona, 2001, p. 128, cat. num. 35, fig. p. 129 (cataleg d¨exposicio).
- "Gaudi e il modernismo catalano", Milan, ed. Modadori Electa, 2003, p. 57, cat. s/num., fig. (cataleg d¨exposicio).
- LITVAK, L., El reino interior, la mujer y el inconsciente en la pintura simbolista, "Mujeres pintadas. La imagen de la mujer en Espana 1890/1914", Madrid, 2003, fig. p. 62
