= Garrote vil (Garrotte) =

Painting by Ramon Casas

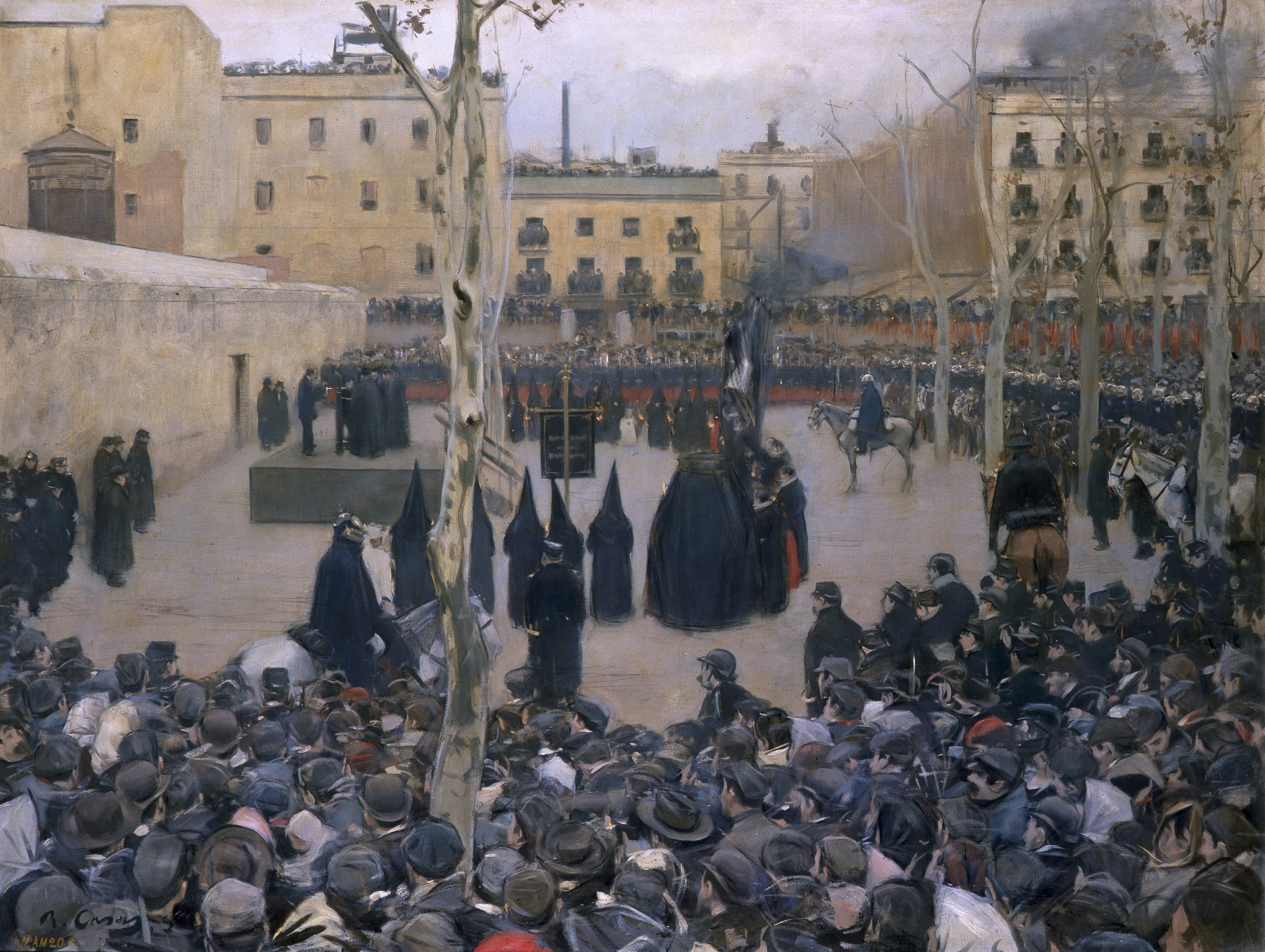
- Artist: Ramon Casas
- Year: 1894
- Medium: Oil on canvas
- Dimensions: 127 cm × 162.5 cm (50 in × 64.0 in)
- Location: Museo Nacional Centro de Arte Reina Sofía; Madrid

Garrote vil (Garrotte) is an oil on canvas painting by Ramon Casas, produced in Barcelona, in 1894. It is held in the Museo Nacional Centro de Arte Reina Sofía, in Madrid. It was first exhibited at Spain's National Exhibition of Fine Arts in 1895, where it won third prize and thus was bought by the state for the former Museo de Arte Moderno. From there it passed to the Prado Museum in 1971 and finally to its present home in 1995 due to a royal decree which re-allocated the Prado and Museo de Arte Moderno's collections.

== History and description ==
Casas had been focusing on portraiture, on interiors with female figures and on the nude in the years of 1893 and 1894. The representation of characters in a crowd, which in the previous decade had resulted in such important works as Entrada a la plaza de toros de Madrid, and some other bullfighting-themed works, had been absent from his more recent production. The episode of the public execution of a prisoner, which took place in Barcelona, in 1893, and drew a large crowd of onlookers, was used by the artist to chronicle the city at this time. Casas, as usual in his paintings of these characteristics, accurately reproduced a very harsh scene, but avoiding social denunciation and limiting himself to capturing the situation in a similar way as to a photographic snapshot.

Casas inaugurates with this work his series of social chronicle paintings, fleeing from the pathos of genre scenes and the solemn rhetoric of history paintings. Apparently, the painter was inspired by the execution of Aniceto Peinador, a nineteen-year-old youngster, who had been executed in 1893, the first execution held in Barcelona in thirty years, done by the usual method in Spain of the vile garrote. Newspapers reported the expectation that this execution created among the people of Barcelona, and especially the photographs of the time, which show people crowded around the gallows, to watch the scene.

The artist chose an elevated point of view for the scene, as a testimony, without eliminating details such as the tree in the foreground that interrupts the view of the scene, even hindering that of the scaffold, and acts as a spatial reference. Casas tried to describe objectively the nature of the public event of the execution, without focusing on any specific protagonist, not even on the victim, barely visible between the executioner and the confessors, on the stage, at the left, and allowing the viewer to wander his gaze as an eyewitness of the scene would have done. Visible are also the members of the Confraternity of the Blood of Christ, wearing their typical conical hoods.
