= Vell i Nou =

Barcelona magazine (1915-1921)

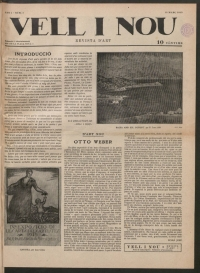
Front cover of Vell i nou

Vell i Nou was a Catalan magazine dedicated to arts that was established in March 1915. Its owner and editor-in-chief was Santiago Segura i Burguess. Later, the magazine was edited by other people, such as Joaquim Folch i Torres, Romà Jori, and Joan Sacs. The format of the magazine was 4 pages measuring 367x270 mm with 3 columns each. It was published weekly until April 10, when it started to appear every fortnight. The editorial office was situated in the Galeries Laietanes (Barcelona). Initially it was printed by F. Borràs, but later changed to other printers such as Oliva de Vilanova.

The magazine was interrupted on December 15, 1919, and a second period started in April 1920. From then on, the magazine was published monthly and it was more eclectic. This second period continued until September 1921. In total, 123 issues were published in these two periods (105 biweekly and 18 monthly).

Later, the magazine continued as a book collection under the title Biblioteca d’art Vell i nou.

== Scope and collaborators ==
The magazine was dedicated to art from all the periods with an erudite and informative objective. The editors said, before the beginning of the magazine, that they had a preference for the considerate as minor arts (the term is applied as a distinction of the fine arts). In the second period, they published texts in Catalan, Spanish, and French.

The collaborators were mostly writers from the Catalan literary and artistic movement Noucentisme. Among them there were Josep Aragay, Miquel Ferrà, Ventura Gassol, López-Picó, Josep Lleonart, Eugenio d'Ors, Carles Riba, Carles Soldevila, and Joaquim Torres i Garcia. Other collaborators were Joaquim Ciervo, Adrià Gual, Josep Maria Junoy, J.F.Ràfols, and Paul Jachard.
